= Politics of Catalonia =

Politics of Spanish state

The politics of Catalonia takes place within the framework of its Statute of Autonomy, which grants a degree of self-government to Catalonia and establish it as an autonomous community of Spain with the status of a nationality, operating as a parliamentary democracy. The Generalitat de Catalunya is the Catalan institution of self-government, which includes the Parliament of Catalonia, the President and the Executive Council. The Parliament of Catalonia is one of the oldest in the world.

Catalan politics also influence some aspects of Spanish politics due to the presence of Catalan nationalist parties in the Spanish Parliament, whose political support is often required by any given winner of the Spanish general elections to form a majority. The currently extinct Convergence and Union party had been described as being "long the region's dominant political party". Catalan politics is also noted, to a lesser extent, for the influence exerted by the Socialists' Party of Catalonia on its sister major party, the Spanish Socialist Workers' Party (PSOE). Recently, the constitutional status of Catalonia was subject to a dispute between the Government of Spain, which view it as an autonomous community within the Kingdom of Spain and the unilaterally declared Catalan Republic, which saw itself as an independent sovereign state.

== 19th and 20th centuries ==
During the 19th and 20th centuries, Catalonia was one of the main centres of Spanish industrialisation. During these years, the struggle between the Barcelona conservative industrial bourgeoisie and the working class dominated Catalan politics, as it did elsewhere in Europe during the industrialisation process. In Catalonia, this situation was nuanced by the fact that immigrants from the rest of Spain were an increasing portion of the workers, since the local workforce was not large enough to cover the demands of a rising economy.

Catalan nationalist and federalist movements arose in the nineteenth century, and when the Second Republic was declared in 1931, Catalonia became an autonomous region. Following the fall of the Second Republic after the Spanish Civil War of 1936–39, the dictatorship of General Francisco Franco annulled Catalonia's autonomy statute and prohibited any public usage, official promotion or recognition of the Catalan language. Its private everyday use was never officially proscribed by law but diminished because of the political situation, mostly in the major urban nuclei. During the last decade of Franco's rule, there was a resurgence of nationalist sentiment in Catalonia and other 'historic' regions of Spain, such as the Basque Country.

== "Dual vote" and current affairs ==
Following Franco's death in 1975 and the restoration of democracy by 1978, Catalonia regained its autonomous status and became one of the autonomous communities within Spain. The Catalan conservative nationalist leader Jordi Pujol came to power in the first regional elections in 1980 and his two-party coalition, Convergence and Unity (CiU), won successive regional elections by absolute majority for 19 years and ruled the autonomous government for 23 consecutive years.

CiU's hegemony occurred in spite of the major cities (including Barcelona's) having been controlled by its main rival party, PSC. It was also in spite of what has been defined as the "dual vote". This refers to the fact that election results in Catalonia consistently vary depending on the election type. Thus, elections for the Catalan regional Parliament have historically been won by the conservative nationalist CiU (this trend persists, even though CiU lost the absolute majority in recent times). However, the social democrat non-nationalist PSC-PSOE has been, and continues to be, the winner of elections for the Spanish Parliament. This has been explained because of the abstention in the regional elections of those voters less concerned with identity questions, and the correspondent high turn out amongst more locally motivated nationalist voters. In addition to this, studies have shown that a number of voters consciously swing their votes from CiU to PSOE, depending on the type of election

Following the 1996 national elections in Spain, Pujol surprised many by lending CiU's support in the Cortes Generales to the minority government of the People's Party (Partido Popular, PP). After having served more than 15 years ruling the autonomous community of Catalonia led by Jordi Pujol, CiU had become eroded while the Socialists' Party of Catalonia (PSC-PSOE), a sister-party of Spain's main social democrat party (Spanish Socialist Workers' Party, PSOE), began to enjoy electoral popularity also in the Catalan election context. This trend culminated in the 2003 election which saw CiU ousted from the government for the first time in 20 years by means of a tripartite left-wing coalition.

When it comes to the nationalist question, one of the 'fault-lines' in contemporary Catalan politics arises from the fact that Barcelona, with its strong metropolitan economy, continues to attract migrants from all over the world. This contemporary layer of immigration is prone to speak Spanish over Catalan and adds to second and third generation Catalans whose families arrived from other parts of Spain during the 20th century in order to cover the needs of industrial workers which the Catalan economy demanded to prosper; amongst the latter, some have become proficient in Catalan, others have not.

On the other side, Catalan remains the predominant language in middle-class and upper-class urban areas, as well as in the region's rural and small cities. All in all, Spanish remains the language spoken by a significant portion of Catalans, particularly in working-class areas. For Catalan nationalists this is perceived, in the worst case, as a threat, and in the best case, as a challenge to be confronted, because Catalan nationalism is centered on language rather than ethnicity.

In any case, Catalan has undoubtedly experienced a spectacular revival since the death of Franco; it has become the language of the autonomous government and enjoys a prominence and widespread use. However, the desire of Catalan nationalists to make the use of Catalan language universal is continually thwarted by the dominance of Spanish speakers in some places.

=== Terra Lliure ===
Terra Lliure ("Free Land" or "Free Fatherland"), which was defined as a terrorist group by the United States and the European Union, was founded in 1978 as the armed organisation of the Catalan Movement of National Liberation (MCAN), a wide movement seeking independence and socialism for Catalonia and the whole Catalan speaking domain, including Valencia, the Balearic Islands and Northern Catalonia (in Southern France) - what is also known as the Catalan Countries.

It began an armed campaign, consisting of hundreds of bombings which was brought to an end by harsh police operations in 1992. Four of its members were killed in action and it accidentally caused the death of an innocent victim in one of its bombings. Organisations such as the Movement in Defense of the Fatherland (MDT) provided political support, with mass demonstrations and representatives in some town councils, but during the 1990s the political wing too lost support, resulting in several years of political weakness, which gave way to a revival towards the end of the century.

Despite its similarities, the activities of Terra Lliure and the MCAN have not reached the strength and notoriety of ETA and the basque pro-independence movement.

== During the 21st century ==
At the 2003 regional elections (for which Pujol did not run) CiU could not renew its absolute majority and PSC's Pasqual Maragall became President of the Generalitat by means of a left-wing tripartite coalition. Maragall's socialists kept being the main opposition party, but actually lost seats: the bigger winners were the independentist Republican Left of Catalonia (Esquerra Republicana de Catalunya (ERC), and the ecosocialists. Since CiU did not win an absolute majority, the combined forces of all three left parties allowed the change in government. While PSC maintained the post of President of the Generalitat (Maragall), ERC nominated the First Minister (Conseller Primer) — Josep-Lluís Carod-Rovira and, later on, Josep Bargalló.

This first tripartite rule became an uneasy coalition due to tensions between the PSC and ERC and internal tensions between PSC and PSOE as well. The evidence of such an uneasy relationship was the controversial forging of the amendment to the Statute of Autonomy of Catalonia.

The 2006 regional election saw Convergència i Unió (CiU) increasing its numbers, while both the PSC and ERC lost seats, but still was not enough of an increase for CiU to block the formation of a second left-wing tripartite coalition (PSC+ERC+ICV), again led by PSC's, this time being José Montilla the President of the Generalitat. Also this election saw a newly created party Ciutadans - Partido de la Ciudadanía entering the regional Parliament.

The new century has also seen a revival of the Esquerra Independentista (pro-independence left), which has again regained some of its strength after the end of Terra Lliure in 1995. Its Popular Unity Candidacy have done well in the municipal elections of 2007, gaining over 20 town council members.

=== The amendment to the Statute and current political issues ===
Unlike the autonomous communities of Navarre and the Basque Country, Catalonia lacks its own tax system; thus the economic financing of the regional administration depends almost entirely on funds raised by national-government taxation and budgeted to Catalonia. This became a mainstream issue at the time of amending the Catalan Statute of Autonomy. From an economic perspective, the regional government aims to achieve a high degree of fiscal autonomy (based on the argument that the region pays in more to the national Spanish coffers than it receives, thus overlooking the "solidarity between regions" enshrined by the Spanish Constitution of 1978).

There was a significant political controversy as a result of the Catalan parliament's proposed draft of a replacement Autonomy Statute which sought to define Catalonia as a 'nation'. Article 2 of the 1978 Spanish Constitution states that the constitution "is based in the indissoluble unity of the Spanish Nation (Nación)" while also referring to the "right to autonomy of the nationalities and regions (nacionalidades y regiones)". These nationalities and regions are left unnamed in the Constitution. The controversy centered on whether referring to any Autonomous Community of Spain as a "nation" may go against Article 2 and whether the Catalan claim to be a nación rather than a nacionalidad had separatist overtones subversive of the "indissoluble unity" of Spain. There was also a high degree of controversy about the control of all taxes, and a parallel judicial system. In the end, and after much controversy, a watered-down version was passed, although the political debate lingers on.

=== The independence issue ===
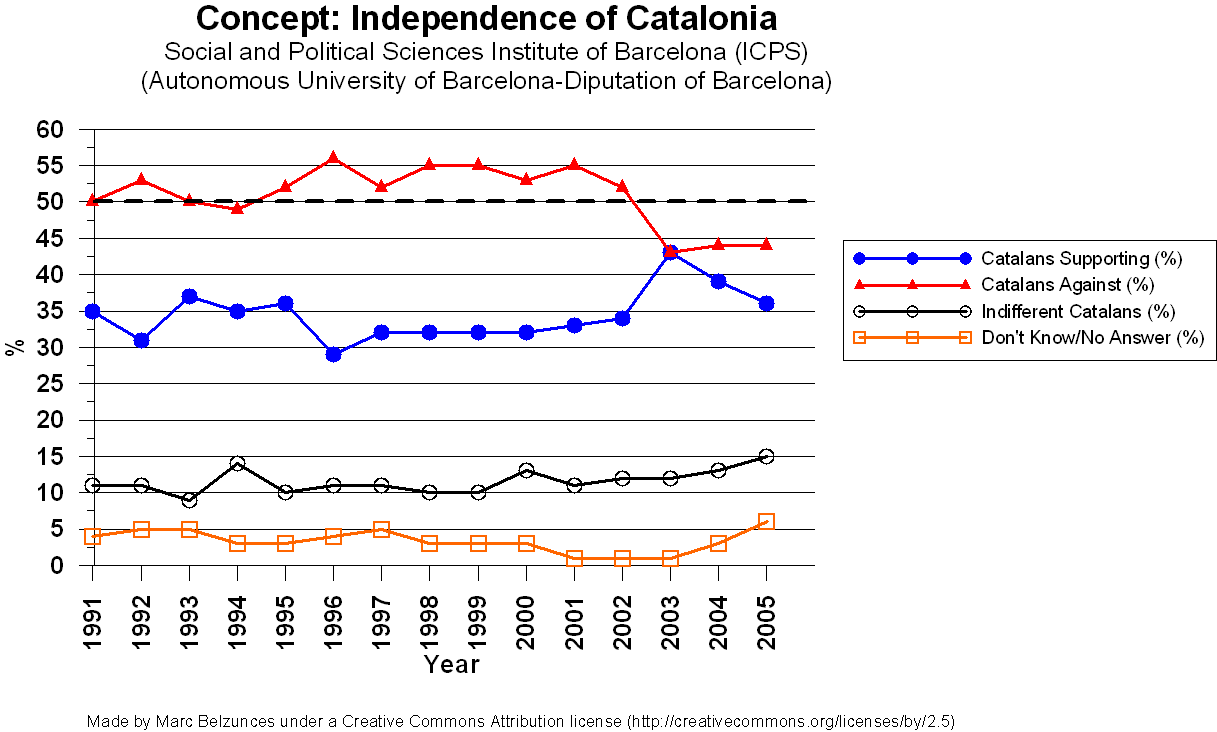
Independentism support Catalonia, according to ICPS

An essential aspect of Catalonian politics is the issue of independence or self-determination. The law does not recognize a "right of self-determination" in spite of a politically relevant pro independence movement in Catalonia. According to the governmental Sociology Studies Center (CIS) CIS official poll in 2001 there were 33.9% of Catalans in favor of an independent Catalonia, 48.1% against, 13.3 undecided and 2.8% did not answer. CIS has not repeated this poll to date.

Conversely, factors such as public indifference at the time of voting the amendment of the Statute of Autonomy (see "dual vote" section above) starkly contrasted with the harsh political controversy behind its amendment. Besides, the advent in the 2006 regional elections of a new party whose main ideology is countering Catalan nationalism, Ciutadans - Partido de la Ciudadanía, all make the independence issue a far from univocal question.

In 2007, a poll indicated that, when asked about the relationship between Catalonia and Spain, 59.5% of respondents thought that Catalonia should be an autonomous community within Spain (the current situation), 17.5% considered that Catalonia should be a state within a federal state and only 13.5% believed that Catalonia should be an independent state separate from Spain. The rest of respondents gave other answers, although only a small minority, 5.5%, stated that Catalonia should be a region within Spain, which would mean less self-government.

Another official poll by Centre d'Estudis d'Opinió (CEO) in 2012 determined that around 51% of Catalans would vote for an independent Catalonia if there was a referendum, 21.1% would vote against and another 21.1% would not vote.

In the May 2024 regional election, the Socialists' Party of Catalonia (PSC), led by Salvador Illa, won a plurality of votes and seats, becoming the largest force in the Parliament of Catalonia.

=== Parties ===
- Socialists' Party of Catalonia (Social democracy, Catalan nationalism)
- Together for Catalonia (Liberalism, Catalan independence)
- Republican Left of Catalonia (Social democracy, Catalan independence)
- People's Party (Conservatism, Spanish nationalism)
- Vox (Islamophobia, Spanish nationalism)
- Comuns Sumar (Ecofeminism, Catalan nationalism)
- Popular Unity Candidacy (Social feminism, Catalan independence)
- Catalan Alliance (Islamophobia, Catalan independence)
- Animalist Party with the Environment (Environmentalism, anti-bullfigthig)
- Citizens (Liberalism, Spanish nationalism)
- Workers' Front (Communism, Islamophobia)
- Alhora (Big tent, Catalan independence)
- Izquierda por la Tolerancia Lingüística (English: Left for Linguistic Tolerance)

=== Summary of votes and seats ===
The latest parliamentary elections took place in February 2021

=== Overall ===
← Summary of the 14 February 2021 Parliament of Catalonia election results →
Parties and alliances	Popular vote			Seats	
Parties and alliances	Votes	%	±pp	Total	+/−
Socialists' Party of Catalonia (PSC–PSOE)	654,766	23.03	+9.17	33	+16
Republican Left of Catalonia (ERC)	605,581	21.30	−0.08	33	+1
Together for Catalonia (JxCat)^{1}	570,539	20.07	n/a	32	+12
Vox (Vox)	218,121	7.67	New	11	+11
In Common We Can–We Can In Common (ECP–PEC)^{2}	195,345	6.87	−0.59	8	±0
Popular Unity Candidacy–A New Cycle to Win (CUP–G)	189,924	6.68	+2.22	9	+5
Citizens–Party of the Citizenry (Cs)	158,606	5.58	−19.77	6	−30
People's Party (PP)	109,453	3.85	−0.39	3	−1
Catalan European Democratic Party (PDeCAT)^{1}	77,229	2.72	n/a	0	−14
Zero Cuts–Green Group–Municipalists (Recortes Cero–GV–M)	12,783	0.45	+0.21	0	±0
Primaries for the Independence of Catalonia Movement (MPIC)	6,017	0.21	New	0	±0
National Front of Catalonia (FNC)	5,003	0.18	New	0	±0
Nationalist Party of Catalonia (PNC)	4,560	0.16	New	0	±0
Communist Party of the Workers of Catalonia (PCTC)	4,515	0.16	New	0	±0
Left in Positive (IZQP)	2,073	0.07	New	0	±0
We Are the Ebre Lands (Som Terres de l'Ebre)	1,415	0.05	New	0	±0
For a Fairer World (PUM+J)	1,339	0.05	+0.04	0	±0
European Union of Pensioners (UEP)	635	0.02	New	0	±0
Blank Seats (EB)	591	0.02	New	0	±0
United for Democracy+Retirees (Unidos SI–DEf–PDSJE–Somos España)	429	0.02	New	0	±0
Alliance for Commerce and Housing (Alianza CV)	173	0.01	New	0	±0
Catalan Civil Support (SCAT)	137	0.00	New	0	±0
Red Current Movement (MCR)	94	0.00	New	0	±0
Blank ballots	24,087	0.85	+0.41		
Total	2,843,415			135	±0
Valid votes	2,843,415	98.56	−1.07		
Invalid votes	41,430	1.44	+1.07		
Votes cast / turnout	2,884,845	51.29	−27.80		
Abstentions	2,739,222	48.71	+27.80		
Registered voters	5,624,067				
Sources
Footnotes: ^{1} Within the Together for Catalonia alliance in the 2017 election.; ^{2} In Common We Can–We Can In Common results are compared to Catalonia in Common–We Can totals in the 2017 election.

Popular vote
PSC–PSOE	23.03%
ERC	21.30%
JxCat	20.07%
Vox	7.67%
ECP–PEC	6.87%
CUP–G	6.68%
Cs	5.58%
PP	3.85%
PDeCAT	2.72%
Others	1.40%
Blank ballots	0.85%

Seats
PSC–PSOE	24.44%
ERC	24.44%
JxCat	23.70%
Vox	8.15%
CUP–G	6.67%
ECP–PEC	5.93%
Cs	4.44%
PP	2.22%

=== Distribution by constituency ===
Constituency	PSC		ERC		JxCat		Vox		ECP–PEC		CUP–G		Cs		PP	
Constituency	%	S	%	S	%	S	%	S	%	S	%	S	%	S	%	S
Barcelona	25.0	23	20.4	19	17.9	16	7.8	7	7.8	7	6.3	5	6.1	5	4.0	3
Girona	15.2	3	21.8	4	32.7	7	6.1	1	4.0	−	9.0	2	3.3	−	2.0	−
Lleida	15.0	3	26.6	5	28.0	5	5.5	1	3.2	−	7.4	1	3.2	−	3.5	−
Tarragona	20.0	4	24.5	5	19.4	4	9.4	2	4.9	1	6.8	1	5.2	1	4.3	−
Total	23.0	33	21.3	33	20.1	32	7.7	11	6.9	8	6.7	9	5.6	6	3.8	3
