= List of mayors of Badalona =

This list of mayors Badalona starts in 1835, after the reform of the ayuntamientos by the central government, during the regency of Maria Christina of the Two Sicilies. Currently the mayor is the head of the government and the municipal administration. It has several functions, including representing the city council in all the officials acts, summons and chairs the plenary sessions and the local government council.

Name	Term	Party
Joan Banús Pujol	1835–1837	
Francesc d'Assís Planas Barriga	1837–1839	
Pere Vehils Torrents	1839–1841	
Pere Casals Xicota	1841–1842	
Salvador Pujol Bruguera	1842–1843	
Ramon Llobet Arquer	1843–1843	
Pere Vehils Torrents	1843–1843	
Onofre Bachs Cuixart	1843–1844	
Josep Rosés Torrents-Lladó	1844–1846	
Josep Comas Renom	1846–1848	
Francesc Agell Martí	1848–1849	
Francesc d'Assís Antoja Vilaseca	1849-1849	
Josep Rosés Torrents-Lladó	1849–1852	
Gerard Maristany Campmany	1852–1854	
Onofre Bachs Cuixart	1854–1854	
Josep Brunet Torres	1854–1855	
Francesc Bosch Monpart	1855–1855	
Josep Brunet Torres	1855–1856	
Pere Vehils Torrents	1856-1856	
Josep Viñas Cuadras	1856–1865	
Gerard Maristany Campmany	1865–1868	
Martí Planas Planas	1868–1868	
Sebastià Badia Gibert	1868–1872	
Josep Solà Seriol	1872–1872	
Sebastià Badia Gibert	1872–1872	
Josep Solà Seriol	1872–1873	
Martí Guardiola Roig	1873–1874	
Sebastià Badia Gibert	1874–1875	
Josep Marinel·lo Rosés	1875-1875	
Jaume Botey Garriga	1875–1876	Conservative Party
Ramon Planas Planas	1876–1879	Conservative Party
Josep Caritg Arnó	1879–1881	Conservative Party
Francesc d'Assís Guixeras Viñas	1881–1884	Liberal Party
Josep Caritg Arnó	1884–1886	Conservative Party
Francesc d'Assís Guixeras Viñas	1886–1887	Liberal Party
Francesc Viñas Renom	1887–1890	Liberal Party
Carles Parés Marsans	1890–1891	Liberal Party
Enric Llobateras Prat	1891–1893	Conservative Party
Pere Renom Riera	1893–1894	Liberal Party
Joaquim Palay Jaurés	1894–1895	Conservative Party
Pere Folch Pujadas	1895–1897	Conservative Party
Joaquim Palay Jaurés	1897–1898	Conservative Party
Joan Torres Viza	1898–1898	
Francesc Viñas Renom	1898–1898	Liberal Party
Pere Renom Riera	1898–1899	Liberal Party
Valentí Moragas Sabatés	1899-1899	Acting
Ramon Amat Comellas	1899–1902	Conservative Party
Joaquim Costa Alsina	1902–1904	Conservative Party
Josep Suñol Capdevila	1904–1904	Conservative Party
Josep Valls Riera	1904–1905	Conservative Party
Josep Fonollà Sabater	1905–1906	Acting
Martí Pujol Planas	1906–1910	Regionalist League of Catalonia
Leopold Botey Vila	1910–1910	Regionalist League of Catalonia
Josep Vergés Vallmajor	1910–1912	Regionalist League of Catalonia
Martí Pujol Planas	1912–1914	Badalona's Solidarity
Josep Casas Costa	1914–1918	Republican Nationalist Federal Union
Jaume Martí Cabot	1918–1919	Republican Nationalist Federal Union
Joaquim Pujol Oliveras	1919–1923	Regionalist League of Catalonia
Jaume Martí Cabot	1923-1923	Republican Nationalist Federal Union
Josep Fonollà Sabater	1923–1924	Dictatorship of Primo de Rivera
Pere Sabaté Curto	1924–1930	Dictatorship of Primo de Rivera
Baldomero San Martín Arnal	1930–1930	Acting
Lluís Ysamat Lazzoli	1930–1931	Regionalist League of Catalonia
Josep Casas Costa	1931–1934	Republican Nationalist Federal Union
Joan Deulofeu Arquer	1934–1934	Republican Left of Catalonia
Pere Borràs Milà	1934–1936	Acting
Joan Deulofeu Arquer	1936-1936	Republican Left of Catalonia
Frederic Xifré Masferrer	1936–1937	Republican Left of Catalonia
Vicenç Roura Boix	1937–1937	Acting
Josep Martínez Écija	1937–1937	Sindicalist
Joan Manent Pesas	1937–1938	Sindicalist
Josep Martínez Écija	1938–1938	Sindicalist
Pere Cané Barceló	1938–1939	Sindicalist
Miquel Xicart Potrony	1939–1939	Dictatorship of Franco
Miquel Sotero Llull	1939–1940	Dictatorship of Franco
Salvador Serentill Costa	1940–1945	Dictatorship of Franco
Luis Maristany Palanco	1945–1954	Dictatorship of Franco
Santiago March Blanch	1954–1961	Dictatorship of Franco
Miquel Cardelús Carrera	1961–1961	Dictatorship of Franco
Josep Torras Trias	1961–1964	Dictatorship of Franco
Felipe Antoja Vigo	1964–1974	Dictatorship of Franco
José Guillén Clapés	1974–1974	Dictatorship of Franco
Isidre Caballeria Pla	1974–1977	Spanish transition to democracy
Alfons Ramos Cruz	1977–1979	Spanish transition to democracy
Màrius Díaz Bielsa	1979–1983	Unified Socialist Party of Catalonia
Joan Blanch Rodríguez	1983–1999	Socialists' Party of Catalonia
Maite Arqué Ferrer	1999–2008	Socialists' Party of Catalonia
Jordi Serra Isern	2008–2011	Socialists' Party of Catalonia
Xavier García Albiol	2011–2015	People's Party of Catalonia
Dolors Sabater Puig	2015–2018	Let's win Badalona in Common
Àlex Pastor López	2018–2020	Socialists' Party of Catalonia
Aïda Llauradó Álvarez (Acting)	2020–2020	En Comú Podem
Xavier García Albiol	2020–2021	People's Party of Catalonia
Rubén Guijarro	2021–Present	Socialists' Party of Catalonia
