= 2017 Catalan regional election =

Election in the Spanish region of Catalonia

- 21 December 2017

All 135 seats in the Parliament of Catalonia 68 seats needed for a majority
- Opinion polls
- Registered: 5,554,455 ▲0.8%
- Turnout: 4,392,891 (79.1%) ▲4.1 pp
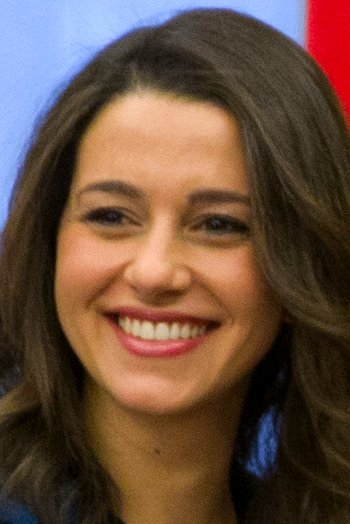

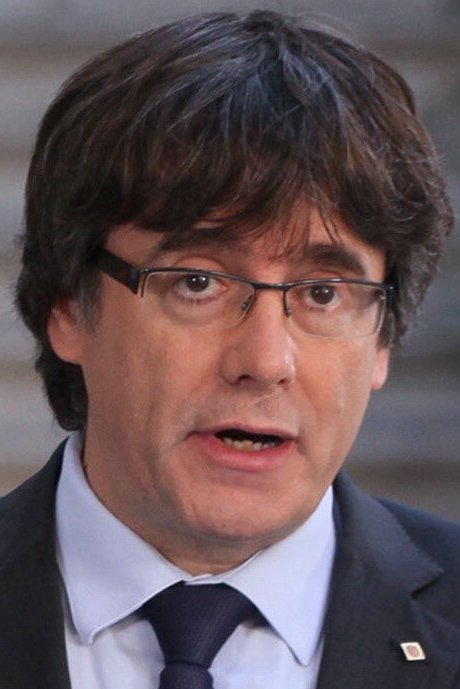

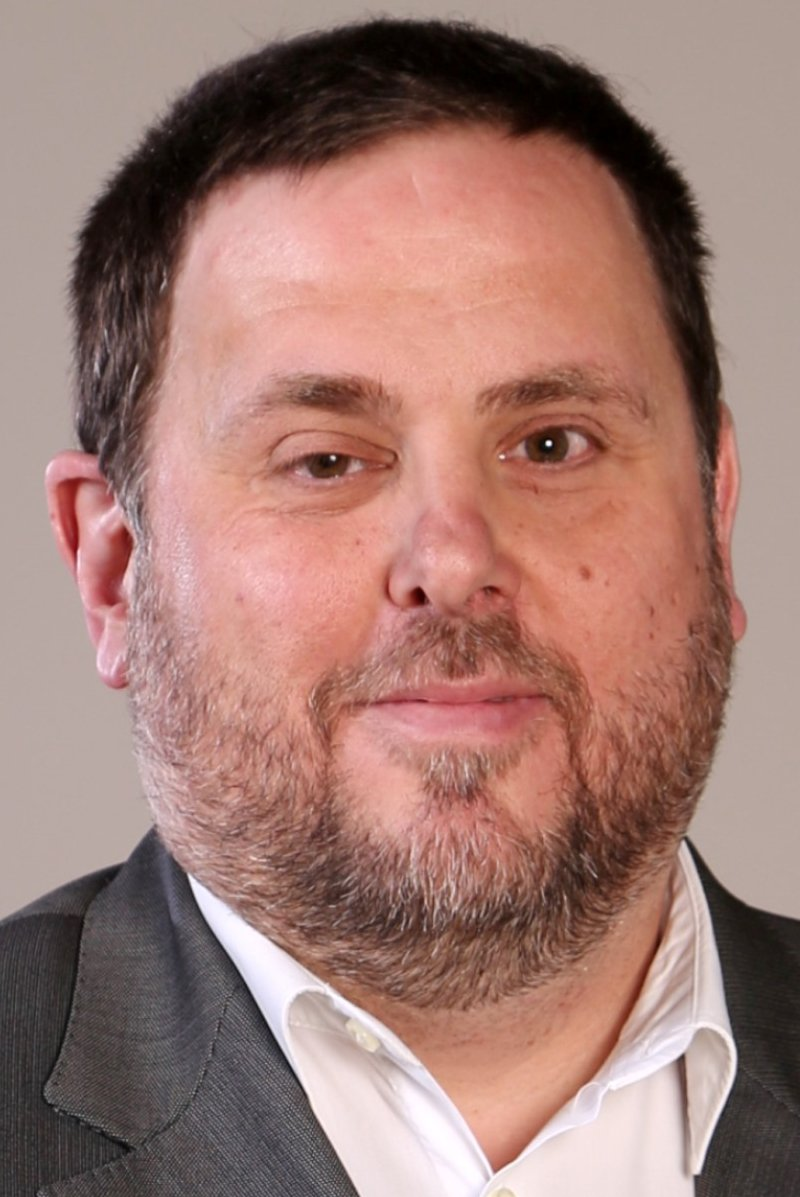

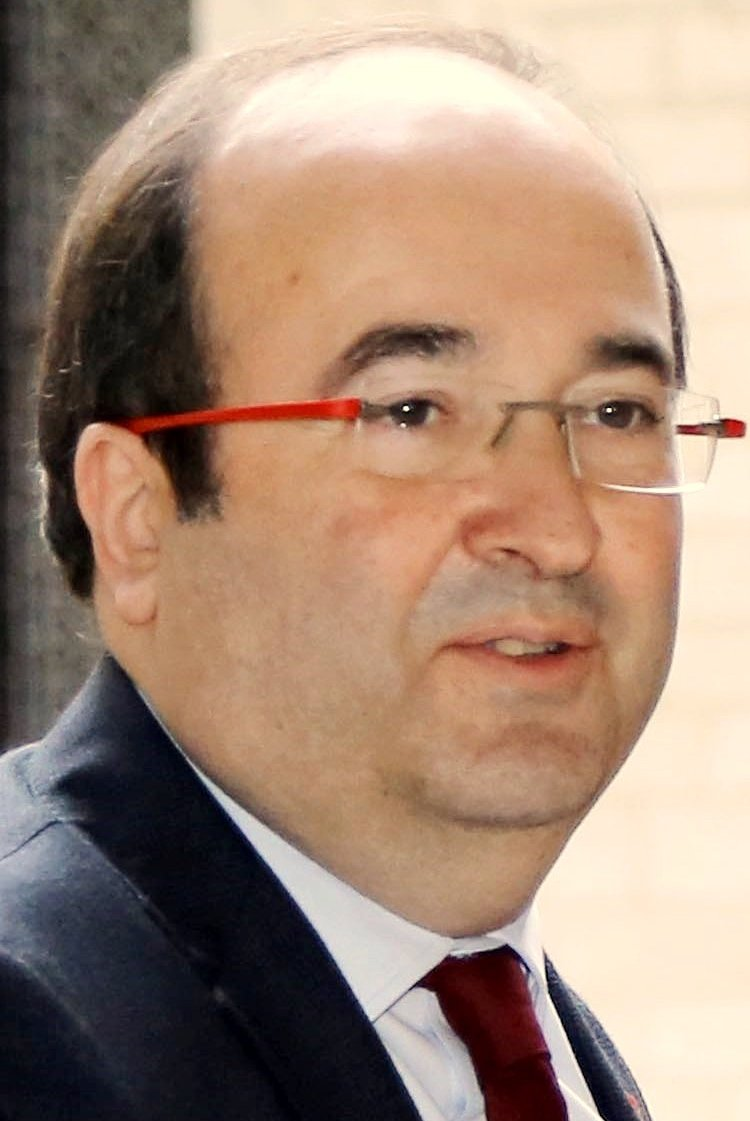

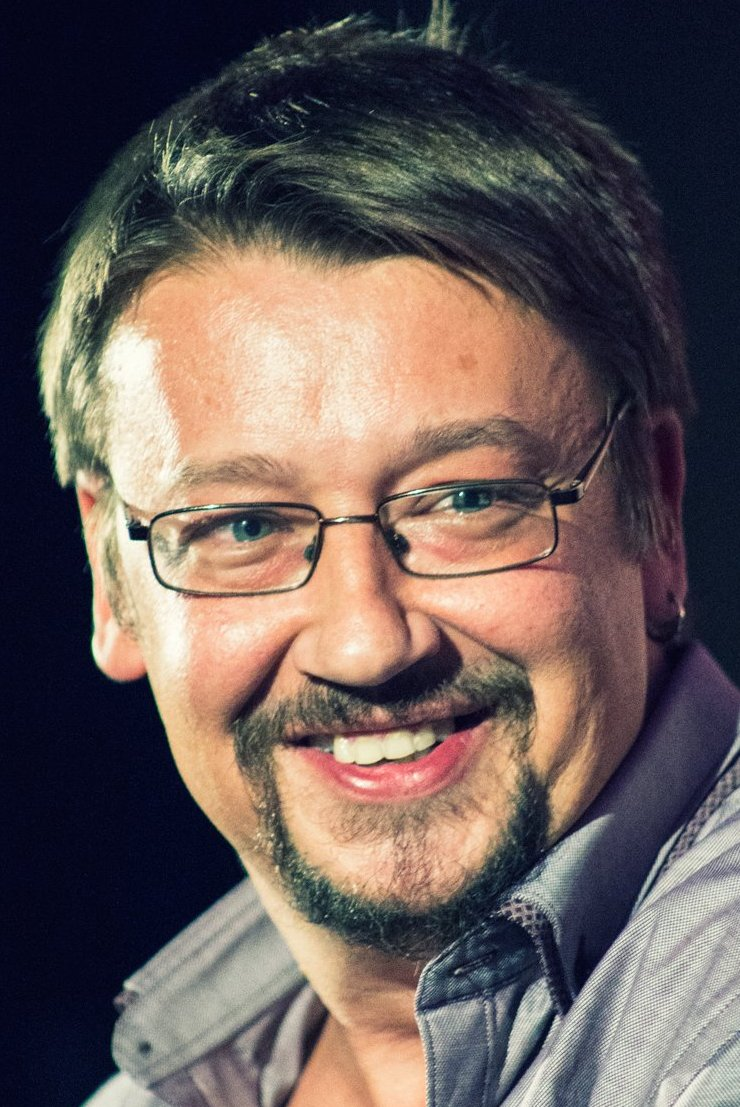

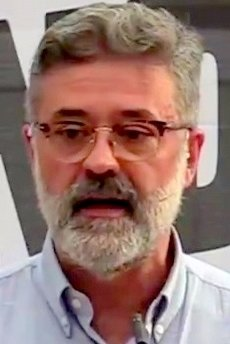

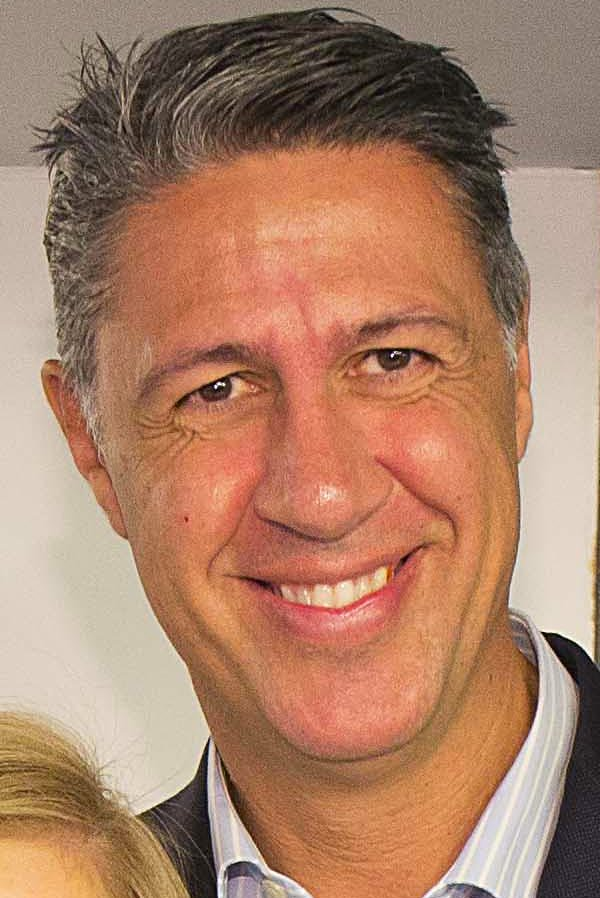
	First party	Second party	Third party
Leader	Inés Arrimadas	Carles Puigdemont (Note: As a result of the exceptional circumstances amid which the election was held, at the time of the election's call Carles Puigdemont had self-exiled himself to Belgium in order to avoid action from the Spanish judiciary, whereas Oriol Junqueras had been put in preventive detention in Estremera (Community of Madrid).)	Oriol Junqueras
Party	Cs	JuntsxCat	ERC–CatSí
Leader since	3 July 2015	13 November 2017	17 September 2011
Leader's seat	Barcelona	Barcelona	Barcelona
Last election	25 seats, 17.9%	31 seats (JxSí) (Note: Within the JxSí alliance in the 2015 election: CDC (30 seats), ERC (21 seats), civil society independents (5 seats), ERC-aligned independents (3 seats), DC (1 seat), MES (1 seat) and CDC-aligned independents (1 seat). 2015 totals for ERC–CatSí include DC and MES. 2015 totals for both JuntsxCat and ERC–CatSí include aligned independents who ran within the JxSí alliance.)	26 seats (JxSí)
Seats won	36	34	32
Seat change	▲11	▲3	▲6
Popular vote	1,109,732	948,233	935,861
Percentage	25.4%	21.7%	21.4%
Swing	▲7.5 pp	n/a	n/a
	Fourth party	Fifth party	Sixth party
Leader	Miquel Iceta	Xavier Domènech	Carles Riera
Party	PSC–PSOE	CatComú–Podem	CUP
Leader since	19 July 2014	8 April 2017	15 November 2017
Leader's seat	Barcelona	Barcelona	Barcelona
Last election	16 seats, 12.7%	11 seats, 8.9% (Note: Results for CatSíqueesPot in the 2015 election.)	10 seats, 8.2%
Seats won	17	8	4
Seat change	▲1	▼3	▼6
Popular vote	606,659	326,360	195,246
Percentage	13.9%	7.5%	4.5%
Swing	▲1.2 pp	▼1.4 pp	▼3.7 pp
	Seventh party
Leader	Xavier García Albiol
Party	PP
Leader since	28 July 2015
Leader's seat	Barcelona
Last election	11 seats, 8.5%
Seats won	4
Seat change	▼7
Popular vote	185,670
Percentage	4.2%
Swing	▼4.3 pp
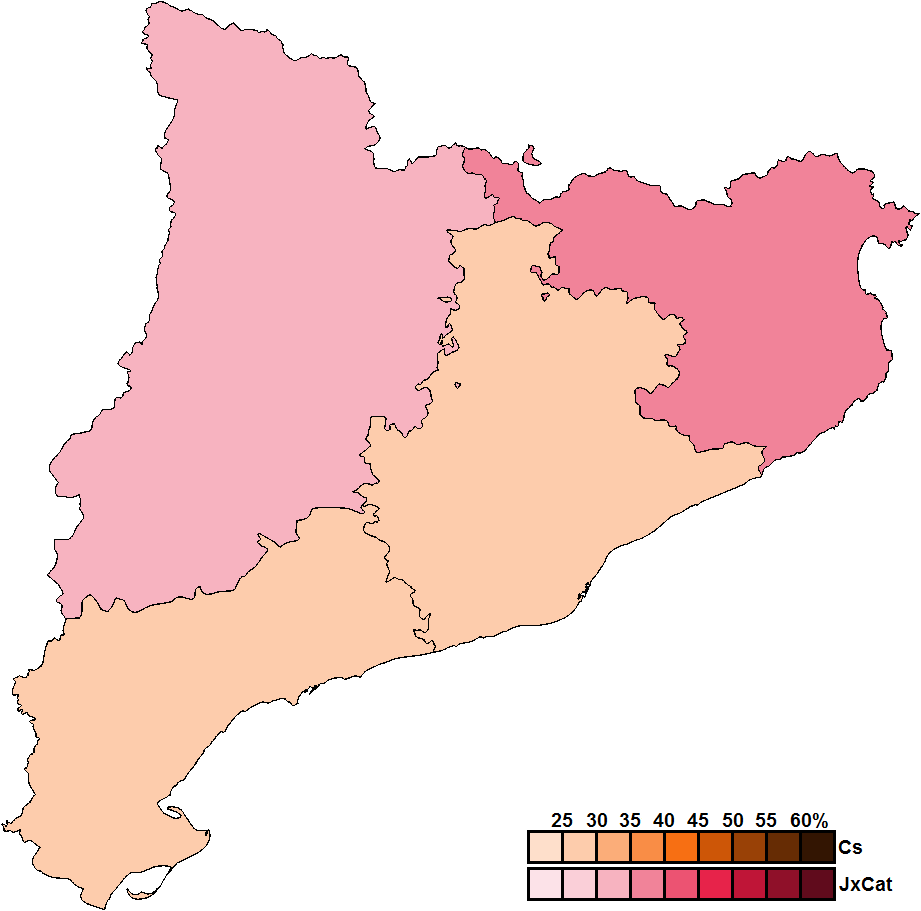
President before election
Office suspended; previously
Carles Puigdemont (PDeCAT)
President after election
Quim Torra
Independent (JuntsxCat)

A regional election was held in Catalonia on 21 December 2017 to elect the 12th Parliament of the autonomous community. All 135 seats in the Parliament were up for election. The election was called by Spanish prime minister Mariano Rajoy after the invocation of Article 155 of the 1978 Spanish Constitution to enforce direct rule in Catalonia and the subsequent dismissal of the Catalan government under President Carles Puigdemont. The three pro-Catalan independence parties won a slim majority of parliamentary seats, claiming 70 out of 135, but fell short of a majority in the popular vote by securing 47.6% of the share.

Pro-Catalan independence parties maintained their parliamentary majority at the 2015 election, although then-President Artur Mas and his Junts pel Sí (JxSí) coalition—made up primarily by Democratic Convergence of Catalonia (CDC) and Republican Left of Catalonia (ERC)—required support from the Popular Unity Candidacy (CUP) to govern. The CUP's decision to vote against Mas led to his withdrawal and to the election of Carles Puigdemont, until then mayor of Girona, as leader of a CDC–ERC coalition government. Shortly thereafter, CDC was re-founded as the Catalan European Democratic Party (PDeCAT).

On 27 October 2017, following the controversial referendum on 1 October, the pro-independence majority in the Catalan parliament voted in favour of a unilateral declaration of independence, just hours before the Spanish Senate voted to invoke Article 155 of the Spanish Constitution. This allowed Prime Minister Mariano Rajoy to dismiss the Catalan government and dissolve the Catalan parliament, calling a regional election for 21 December. With 36 seats, the main anti-independence party, Citizens (Cs), emerged as the largest in the Parliament. The Socialists' Party of Catalonia (PSC) performed well below expectations and increased its seat count by one, whereas Catalunya en Comú–Podem, a left-wing party in favor of self-governance for the region but not siding itself with either bloc, received 7.5% of the vote and 8 seats. Owing to the combined performance of Puigdemont's Together for Catalonia (JuntsxCat) and ERC, parties in support of independence maintained their majority in the election, meaning that it was mathematically possible for a pro-independence coalition government to return to power, despite their overall majority having been reduced by two seats.

The biggest election loser was Rajoy's People's Party (PP), whose electoral collapse—reduced to 4.2% of the share and 4 out of 135 seats—meant it would be unable to form a parliamentary group of its own in the Catalan parliament for the first time in history. The scale of PP's downfall, coupled with the success of Cs, threatened to have a political impact beyond Catalonia, with PP leaders fearing it could spell the end of the party's hegemony over the centre-right vote in Spain.

== Background ==
=== Government formation ===
The 2015 election resulted in pro-Catalan independence Junts pel Sí (JxSí) (a coalition comprising the two main centre-right and centre-left Catalan parties at the time, Democratic Convergence of Catalonia (CDC) and Republican Left of Catalonia (ERC), together with several minor parties) and Popular Unity Candidacy (CUP) holding a slim majority of seats, despite not securing a majority of votes as was their objective. President Artur Mas' JxSí coalition also fell short of its goal to secure an absolute majority on its own, obtaining 62 seats against the combined 63 of the remaining opposition parties. Thus, Mas found himself depending on CUP's support for securing his nomination to be re-elected to the office. The CUP had difficulty in supporting Mas, whom they viewed as personally tainted by several corruption scandals involving his CDC party. In the end, a last-minute deal was struck between JxSí and the CUP to ensure a pro-independence government under CDC's Carles Puigdemont, narrowly avoiding a new election being called and leading Mas to retire from frontline politics.

=== 2017 events ===
On 26 October 2017, several weeks after a major crisis had unveiled in Catalonia over the attempted celebration of an unconstitutional independence referendum, it was expected that President Puigdemont would call a snap regional election to prevent the Spanish government from enforcing direct rule in the region, a procedure involving the triggering of Article 155 of the Spanish Constitution which was already underway in the Spanish Senate, pending approval on the following day. This move sparked outcry within pro-independence ranks, including members within Puigdemont's coalition, who had aimed for a unilateral declaration of independence in response to the triggering of Article 155. Finally, Puigdemont ruled out calling an election, allegedly because of the Spanish government's refusal to call off the invocation of the Article 155 procedure even were an election to be called by Catalan authorities. After Puigdemont's refusal to call an election, a debate over a possible declaration of independence went ahead as planned in the Parliament of Catalonia, simultaneous to the Senate debating the enforcement of direct rule. At the end of the debate, the Catalan parliament voted a unilateral declaration of independence which was backed 70–10, two MPs casting a blank ballot and all MPs from Citizens (Cs), the Socialists' Party of Catalonia (PSC) and the People's Party (PP) boycotting the vote. Once Article 155 was approved, Mariano Rajoy dismissed the entire Catalan government from office and declared the Parliament's dissolution, calling a regional election for 21 December 2017.

Puigdemont and part of his removed cabinet fled to Belgium on 30 October in a move to avoid action from the Spanish judiciary, as the Spanish Attorney General José Manuel Maza announced a criminal complaint against them for rebellion, sedition and embezzlement. On 2 November, the Spanish National Court ordered that eight members of the deposed Catalan government—including former Vice President and ERC leader Oriol Junqueras—be remanded in custody without bail after being summoned to appear to respond to the criminal charges pressed against them, with a ninth—Santi Vila—being granted a €50,000 bail. European Arrest Warrants were issued for Puigdemont and his four other cabinet members in Belgium refusing to attend the hearing.

== Overview ==
Under the 2006 Statute of Autonomy, the Parliament of Catalonia was the unicameral legislature of the homonymous autonomous community, having legislative power in devolved matters, as well as the ability to grant or withdraw confidence from a regional president. The electoral and procedural rules were supplemented by national law provisions.

=== Date ===
The term of the Parliament of Catalonia expired four years after the date of its previous election, unless it was dissolved earlier. The election was required to be called no later than 15 days before the scheduled expiration date of parliament, with election day taking place between 40 and 60 days from the call. The previous election was held on 27 September 2015, which meant that the chamber's term would have expired on 27 September 2019. The election was required to be called no later than 12 September 2019, setting the latest possible date for election day on 11 November 2019.

The regional president had the prerogative to dissolve the Parliament of Catalonia at any given time and call a snap election, provided that no motion of no confidence was in process and that dissolution did not occur before one year after a previous one under this procedure. In the event of an investiture process failing to elect a regional president within a two-month period from the first ballot, the Parliament was to be automatically dissolved and a fresh election called.

The Parliament of Catalonia was officially dissolved on 28 October 2017 with the publication of the corresponding decree in the Official State Gazette (BOE), setting election day for 21 December.

=== Electoral system ===
Voting for the Parliament was based on universal suffrage, comprising all Spanish nationals over 18 years of age, registered in Catalonia and with full political rights, provided that they had not been deprived of the right to vote by a final sentence, nor were legally incapacitated. Additionally, non-resident citizens were required to apply for voting, a system known as "begged" voting (Spanish: Voto rogado).

The Parliament of Catalonia had a minimum of 100 and a maximum of 150 seats, with electoral provisions fixing its size at 135. All were elected in four multi-member constituencies—corresponding to the provinces of Barcelona, Girona, Lleida and Tarragona, each of which was assigned a fixed number of seats—using the D'Hondt method and closed-list proportional voting, with a three percent-threshold of valid votes (including blank ballots) in each constituency. The use of this electoral method resulted in a higher effective threshold depending on district magnitude and vote distribution.

As a result of the aforementioned allocation, each Parliament constituency was entitled the following seats:

Seats	Constituencies
85	Barcelona
18	Tarragona
17	Girona
15	Lleida

The law did not provide for by-elections to fill vacant seats; instead, any vacancies arising after the proclamation of candidates and during the legislative term were filled by the next candidates on the party lists or, when required, by designated substitutes.

=== Outgoing parliament ===
The table below shows the composition of the parliamentary groups in the chamber at the time of dissolution.

Parliamentary composition in October 2017
Groups	Parties	Legislators	
Groups	Parties	Seats	Total
Together for Yes's Parliamentary Group	PDeCAT	30	61
Together for Yes's Parliamentary Group	ERC	23	61
Together for Yes's Parliamentary Group	DC	3	61
Together for Yes's Parliamentary Group	MES	1	61
Together for Yes's Parliamentary Group	INDEP	4	61
Citizens's Parliamentary Group	Cs	25	25
Socialist Parliamentary Group	PSC	16	16
Catalonia Yes We Can's Parliamentary Group	ICV	5	11
Catalonia Yes We Can's Parliamentary Group	Podem	4	11
Catalonia Yes We Can's Parliamentary Group	EUiA	1	11
Catalonia Yes We Can's Parliamentary Group	INDEP	1 (Note: Lluís Rabell.)	11
People's Party of Catalonia's Parliamentary Group	PP	11	11
Popular Unity Candidacy–Constituent Call's; Parliamentary Group	CUP	10	10
Non-Inscrits	INDEP	1 (Note: Germà Gordó, former PDeCAT legislator.)	1

== Parties and candidates ==
The electoral law allowed for parties and federations registered in the interior ministry, alliances and groupings of electors to present lists of candidates. Parties and federations intending to form an alliance were required to inform the relevant electoral commission within 10 days of the election call, whereas groupings of electors needed to secure the signature of at least one percent of the electorate in the constituencies for which they sought election, disallowing electors from signing for more than one list. Concurrently, parties, federations or alliances that had not obtained a parliamentary mandate at the preceding election were required to secure the signature of at least 0.1 percent of electors in the aforementioned constituencies. Additionally, a balanced composition of men and women was required in the electoral lists, so that candidates of either sex made up at least 40 percent of the total composition.

Below is a list of the main parties and alliances which contested the election:

Candidacy	Parties and alliances	Leading candidate	Ideology	Previous result		Gov.	Ref.
Candidacy	Parties and alliances	Leading candidate	Ideology	Vote %	Seats	Gov.	Ref.
JuntsxCat	List: Catalan European Democratic Party (PDeCAT); Democratic Convergence of Catalonia (CDC) (Note: CDC was registered as an independent member within the alliance in order to allow its successor party, the PDeCAT, to be guaranteed CDC's public funding and electoral rights for the campaign.); Independents (INDEP) (Note: Including members from EV–AV and RI.cat, as well as future founders of the CNxR and AxR.)	Carles Puigdemont	Catalan independence Liberalism	39.6% (Note: Results for JxSí in the 2015 election.)	62	No	
ERC–CatSí	List: Republican Left of Catalonia (ERC); Catalonia Yes (CatSí); Democrats of Catalonia (DC); Left Movement (MES)	Oriol Junqueras	Catalan independence Left-wing nationalism Social democracy	39.6%	62	No	
Cs	List: Citizens–Party of the Citizenry (Cs)	Inés Arrimadas	Liberalism	17.9%	25	No	
PSC–PSOE	List: Socialists' Party of Catalonia (PSC–PSOE); United to Advance (Els Units)	Miquel Iceta	Social democracy	12.7%	16	No	
CatComú– Podem	List: Catalunya en Comú (CatComú) – Barcelona in Common (BComú) – Initiative for Catalonia Greens (ICV) – United and Alternative Left (EUiA) – Equo (Equo); We Can (Podem)	Xavier Domènech	Left-wing populism Direct democracy Eco-socialism	8.9%	11	No	
PP	List: People's Party (PP)	Xavier García Albiol	Conservatism; Christian democracy	8.5%	11	Yes (Note: Direct rule of the Government of Spain.)	
CUP	List: Popular Unity Candidacy (CUP) – Forward–Socialist Organization of National Liberation (Endavant–OSAN) – Free People (PL–PPCC) – Internationalist Struggle (LI–CI); Pirates of Catalonia (Pirata.cat)	Carles Riera	Catalan independence Anti-capitalism; Socialism	8.2%	10	No	

After independence was declared by the Parliament of Catalonia on 27 October and Prime Minister Mariano Rajoy announced the Parliament's dissolution and a regional election for 21 December, pro-independence parties debated whether they should contest the election–thus abiding by Spanish law, and acknowledging independence did not take place–or boycott it and thus risk remaining absent from the Parliament in the next legislature.

On 5 November 2017, the Catalan European Democratic Party (PDeCAT) proposed as their election candidate Carles Puigdemont, who in the previous days had already showed interest in leading the PDeCAT into the 21 December election from Belgium. PDeCAT members sought to contest the election into a unitary list formed by pro-independence parties for the right of self-determination and against the use of Article 155, calling for "amnesty of political prisoners". On 13 November, the PDeCAT announced that it would run under the Together for Catalonia umbrella, centered around Puigdemont and including non-party members such as Jordi Sànchez.

Republican Left of Catalonia (ERC) rejected the idea of renewing the Junts pel Sí alliance, and made its participation in any prospective electoral coalition conditional on it including the Popular Unity Candidacy (CUP) and members from Catalunya Sí que es Pot–in reference to the Podemos branch in Catalonia (Podem), led by Albano Dante Fachin, who had increasingly distanced himself from the party's national leadership. The CUP dubbed the election "illegitimate" and rejected contesting the election under their own brand, but did not rule out running under a different label or supporting a unitary pro-independence alliance. After the CUP ruled out a coalition with other parties on 7 November, ERC rejected a joint candidacy of pro-independence parties and announced it would contest the election on its own.

Catalunya en Comú, Ada Colau's party successor to the En Comú Podem electoral alliance which contested the 2015 and 2016 general elections in Catalonia, chose Xavier Domènech as its electoral candidate. Domènech proposed an alliance with Podem, which under Fachin had rejected merging into Colau's party earlier in 2017. Podem's grassroots members voted in favour of an alliance with Catalunya en Comú, after Fachin had resigned as regional party leader over disputes with the national leadership. Both parties announced they would contest the election under the Catalunya en Comú–Podem label.

On 7 November, the Socialists' Party of Catalonia (PSC) announced an agreement with Units per Avançar (English: United to Advance), the wing of the defunct party Democratic Union of Catalonia that rejected separatism in 2015, thereby aiming to integrate some of its members in its list and hopefully to add the almost 102,000 votes collected by that party at the previous election, which were not enough to gain representation by themselves. The agreement was refused the status of a proper coalition; hence, PSC ran under its own name only.

Stance on independence	Parties and alliances	Referendum	Unilateralism	Support of direct rule	Ref.
Yes	Together for Catalonia	check	Question	X mark	
Yes	Republican Left–Catalonia Yes	check	Question	X mark	
Yes	Popular Unity Candidacy	check	check	X mark	
No	Citizens–Party of the Citizenry	X mark		check	
No	Socialists' Party of Catalonia	X mark		check	
No	People's Party	X mark		check	
Neutral	Catalonia in Common–We Can	check		X mark	

== Campaign ==
=== Party slogans ===
Party or alliance	Slogan (Catalan)	Slogan (Spanish)	English translation	Ref.
JuntsxCat	« Puigdemont, el nostre president »	« Puigdemont, nuestro presidente »	"Puigdemont, our president"	
ERC–CatSí	« La democràcia sempre guanya »	« La democracia siempre gana »	"Democracy always wins"	
Cs	« Ara sí votarem »	« Ahora sí votaremos »	"Now we will vote"	
PSC–PSOE	« Solucions. Ara, Iceta! »	« Soluciones. ¡Ahora, Iceta! »	"Solutions. Now, Iceta!"	
CatComú–Podem	« Tenim molt en comú »	« Tenemos mucho en común »	"We have a lot in common"	
PP	« Espanya és la solució »	« España es la solución »	"Spain is the solution"	
CUP	« Dempeus! »	« ¡En pie! »	"Stand up!"	

=== Budget ===
Parties and alliances	Budget
Cs	€2,990,833.25
PSC–PSOE	€1,826,932.87
PP	€1,645,200.34
ERC–CatSí	€1,602,303.42
JuntsxCat	€1,263,259.40
CatComú–Podem	€888,339.57
CUP	€469,157.38

=== Debates ===
2017 Catalan regional election debates
Date	Organizer(s)	Moderator(s)	P Present (Note: Denotes a main invitee attending the event.) S Surrogate (Note: Denotes a main invitee not attending the event, sending a surrogate in their place.) NI Not invited I Invited A Absent invitee								
Date	Organizer(s)	Moderator(s)	JxCat	ERC	Cs	PSC	CeC–P	PP	CUP	Share	Ref.
29 November	RTVE (El Debate de La 1)	Julio Somoano	S Dalmases	S Torrent	S Roldán	S Granados	S Ribas	S Levy	S Sànchez	5.5% (54,000)	
3 December	laSexta (Salvados)	Jordi Évole	NI	P Rovira	P Arrimadas	NI	NI	NI	NI	16.0% (485,000)	
7 December	RTVE (El Debat de La 1)	Quim Barnola	S Turull	S Torrent	P Arrimadas	P Iceta	P Domènech	P Albiol	P Riera	8.7% (193,000)	
11 December	CCMA (Més 324) (Note: Debate between Barcelona constituency candidates.)	Xavier Graset	S Madaula	S Mundó	S Sierra	S Granados	S Alamany	S García	S Sirvent	—	
12 December	CCMA (Més 324) (Note: Debate between Tarragona constituency leading candidates.)	Xavier Graset	P Campdepadrós	P Peris	S Roldán	P Ibarra	P López	P Fernández	P Milian	—	
13 December	CCMA (Més 324) (Note: Debate between Lleida constituency leading candidates.)	Xavier Graset	P Forné	S Solé	P Soler	P Ordeig	P Vilà	P Xandri	P Boya	—	
14 December	Cadena SER (Hoy por Hoy)	Pepa Bueno	S Turull	S Maragall	P Arrimadas	P Iceta	P Domènech	P Albiol	P Riera	—	
14 December	CCMA (Més 324) (Note: Debate among Girona constituency leading candidates.)	Xavier Graset	P Geis	S Torrent	P Castel	P Bruguera	P Planagumà	P Olmedo	P Sànchez	—	
17 December	laSexta (17D. El Debat)	Ana Pastor	S Rull	S Mundó	P Arrimadas	P Iceta	P Domènech	P Albiol	S Aragonés	20.4% (577,000)	
18 December	CCMA (E17: El Debat)	Vicent Sanchis	S Turull	S Rovira	P Arrimadas	P Iceta	P Domènech	P Albiol	P Riera	22.5% (580,000)	

== Opinion polls ==
The tables below list opinion polling results in reverse chronological order, showing the most recent first and using the dates when the survey fieldwork was done, as opposed to the date of publication. Where the fieldwork dates are unknown, the date of publication is given instead. The highest percentage figure in each polling survey is displayed with its background shaded in the leading party's colour. If a tie ensues, this is applied to the figures with the highest percentages. The "Lead" column on the right shows the percentage-point difference between the parties with the highest percentages in a poll.

=== Graphical summary ===
Local regression trend line of poll results from 27 September 2015 to 21 December 2017, with each line corresponding to a political party.

=== Voting intention estimates ===
The table below lists weighted voting intention estimates. Refusals are generally excluded from the party vote percentages, while question wording and the treatment of "don't know" responses and those not intending to vote may vary between polling organisations. When available, seat projections determined by the polling organisations are displayed below (or in place of) the percentages in a smaller font; 68 seats were required for an absolute majority in the Parliament of Catalonia.

Color key:

Poll conducted after legal ban on opinion polls

Polling firm/Commissioner	Fieldwork date	Sample size	Turnout	JxSí	CDC PDeCAT	ERC–CatSí	Cs	PSC	CatSíqueesPot CatComú–Podem	PP	CUP	unio.cat	JuntsxCat	Lead
2017 regional election	21 Dec 2017	—N/a	79.1	–	(Note: Within JuntsxCat.)	21.4; 32	25.4; 36	13.9; 17	7.5; 8	4.2; 4	4.5; 4	–	21.7; 34	3.7
GAD3/La Vanguardia	6–21 Dec 2017	3,200	84	–		22.5; 34/36	26.0; 34/37	15.0; 18/20	7.0; 7/8	4.5; 3/5	5.0; 5/6	–	19.0; 28/29	3.5
Celeste-Tel	20 Dec 2017	?	?	–		20.9; 30/31	23.6; 32/33	15.7; 21/22	7.3; 8/9	6.3; 6/7	6.2; 6/7	–	18.1; 28/29	2.7
Feedback/The National	13–20 Dec 2017	1,000	81.5	–		21.2; 30/31	22.5; 29/32	14.9; 19/21	7.8; 10	6.0; 6	6.5; 8/9	–	20.0; 29/30	1.3
Celeste-Tel	19 Dec 2017	?	?	–		22.1; 33	22.6; 30	16.2; 22	7.8; 9	6.4; 7	6.2; 7	–	17.0; 27	0.5
GESOP/El Periòdic	17–19 Dec 2017	900	78–80	–		22.3; 34/35	23.0; 30/31	15.4; 20/21	9.0; 10/11	5.4; 5/6	6.0; 7/8	–	17.2; 25/26	0.7
Feedback/The National	12–19 Dec 2017	1,000	82.3	–		21.9; 31/33	23.4; 32/33	13.9; 17/19	6.2; 7/9	6.0; 6/7	7.5; 9	–	20.1; 29/31	1.5
Celeste-Tel	18 Dec 2017	?	?	–		22.0; 32	22.5; 30	16.3; 23	7.8; 9	6.6; 7	6.2; 7	–	16.9; 27	0.5
GESOP/El Periòdic	16–18 Dec 2017	800	80–82	–		23.3; 36/37	23.2; 31/32	15.4; 20/21	8.7; 10/11	4.8; 4/5	4.9; 5/6	–	18.0; 26/27	0.1
Feedback/The National	11–18 Dec 2017	1,000	83.0	–		21.2; 30/32	24.0; 32/33	14.7; 19/21	6.7; 8/9	5.8; 6/7	7.6; 9/10	–	19.1; 27/29	2.8
Celeste-Tel	17 Dec 2017	?	?	–		22.2; 33	22.3; 30	16.2; 23	7.8; 9	6.7; 7	6.3; 7	–	16.6; 26	0.1
GESOP/El Periòdic (Note: "Ciutadans ganaría las elecciones en votos y ERC, en escaños". El Periòdic d'Andorra (in Spanish). 18 December 2017.)	15–17 Dec 2017	800	80–82	–		21.3; 32/33	22.5; 29/30	15.9; 21/22	9.0; 10/11	5.0; 5/6	5.5; 6/7	–	19.0; 28/29	1.2
Feedback/The National	10–17 Dec 2017	1,000	83.1	–		21.1; 30/32	24.0; 31/33	14.1; 18/20	6.8; 8/9	5.7; 5/7	8.1; 9/10	–	19.5; 28/29	2.9
Celeste-Tel	16 Dec 2017	?	?	–		21.1; 33	22.8; 30	15.7; 22	7.9; 9	6.4; 8	6.5; 8	–	17.6; 25	1.7
GESOP/El Periòdic	14–16 Dec 2017	800	79–81	–		21.3; 32/33	21.2; 27/28	16.9; 23/24	8.8; 10/11	5.6; 6/7	6.5; 7/8	–	18.0; 27/28	0.1
Netquest/L'Independant	12–16 Dec 2017	900	82	–		22.0; 33	23.6; 33	15.1; 19	6.5; 8	5.4; 7	6.9; 9	–	17.1; 26	1.6
Feedback/The National	9–16 Dec 2017	1,000	83.0	–		20.7; 30/31	24.1; 32/33	14.3; 19/20	7.1; 8/9	5.7; 6	8.5; 10	–	19.0; 27/29	3.4
GESOP/El Periòdic	13–15 Dec 2017	800	79–81	–		22.1; 34/35	21.4; 27/28	17.1; 23/24	8.5; 9/10	5.4; 6/7	6.1; 7/8	–	17.5; 25/26	0.7
GAD3/ABC	11–15 Dec 2017	1,510	?	–		20.3; 30/32	25.1; 33/35	15.8; 20/22	7.1; 8	5.4; 5/6	5.5; 6/7	–	19.4; 28/30	4.8
Feedback/The National	8–15 Dec 2017	1,000	82.4	–		20.9; 30	24.2; 33	13.7; 17/19	7.1; 8/9	5.6; 6	8.3; 10	–	19.5; 28/30	3.3
GAD3/ABC	12–14 Dec 2017	1,000	82	–		20.3; 29/31	23.2; 31/32	16.3; 22/23	7.5; 8	6.2; 7/8	5.6; 6	–	19.5; 29/30	2.9
GESOP/El Periódico	12–14 Dec 2017	800	79–81	–		22.2; 34/35	21.2; 27/28	16.9; 23/24	8.9; 10/11	5.6; 6/7	5.5; 6/7	–	17.9; 26/27	1.0
Invymark/laSexta	11–14 Dec 2017	?	?	–		21.6; 31	22.3; 33	15.0; 21	7.9; 10	5.4; 5	6.1; 8	–	18.4; 27	0.7
Top Position	11–14 Dec 2017	1,200	82.7	–		18.2; 27/29	24.5; 35/37	11.7; 14/16	5.9; 5/7	5.5; 5/7	7.0; 8/9	–	22.4; 31/33	2.1
ERC	9–14 Dec 2017	?	80	–		22.8; 33	22.9; 32	13.8; 18	6.2; 8	5.4; 8	7.1; 10	–	18.6; 27	0.1
Feedback/El Nacional	7–14 Dec 2017	1,000	83.6	–		21.2; 30/32	23.1; 31/32	14.9; 19/21	7.2; 8/10	5.7; 6/7	7.6; 9/10	–	19.6; 28/30	1.9
SocioMétrica/El Español	1–14 Dec 2017	1,500	?	–		21.1; 30/31	22.9; 32/33	13.9; 19/20	9.0; 10/11	5.5; 5/6	5.9; 7/8	–	20.3; 28/30	1.8
A+M/Henneo	11–13 Dec 2017	1,500	84.3	–		24.6; 33/35	24.4; 32/34	15.3; 20/21	6.0; 7/8	5.4; 6/7	5.6; 7/8	–	17.7; 24/26	0.2
Sigma Dos/El Mundo	11–13 Dec 2017	1,550	?	–		22.5; 34	22.8; 31/33	15.4; 19/20	7.7; 9/10	5.8; 7/8	6.4; 7/9	–	16.6; 23/26	0.3
MyWord/Cadena SER	5–13 Dec 2017	1,004	?	–		24.3; 34/36	22.4; 30/31	15.1; 20/22	9.0; 10	4.8; 5/6	5.1; 5	–	17.9; 27/29	1.9
Infortécnica/Segre	4–13 Dec 2017	1,216	75	–		23.6; 31/33	23.6; 31/33	17.3; 23/24	5.5; 7/8	6.3; 8/9	5.2; 6/8	–	18.5; 24/26	Tie
NC Report/La Razón	4–13 Dec 2017	1,000	74.9	–		22.4; 34	21.8; 31	15.9; 21	7.6; 9	7.3; 8	5.8; 7	–	16.1; 25	0.6
Metroscopia/El País	4–13 Dec 2017	3,300	81–82	–		23.1; 33	25.2; 35/36	14.3; 20	9.3; 11	5.4; 5/6	6.4; 8	–	14.3; 22	2.1
Feedback/El Nacional	5–12 Dec 2017	1,000	83.1	–		20.9; 30/31	23.6; 32/33	15.2; 20/21	8.2; 10/11	5.4; 5/6	7.7; 9/10	–	18.3; 26/28	2.7
GAPS/JuntsxCat	11 Dec 2017	?	?	–		19.5– 20.5; 29/32	23.3– 24.3; 32/35	12.4– 13.4; 16/18	7.2– 8.2; 8/10	4.2– 5.2; 3/6	6.9– 7.9; 9/11	–	19.9– 20.9; 30/32	3.4
SocioMétrica/El Español	3–11 Dec 2017	1,100	?	–		21.5; 30/32	21.9; 29/31	14.6; 19/21	9.1; 10/12	5.0; 4/6	5.3; 6/8	–	20.6; 30/32	0.4
SocioMétrica/El Español	1–9 Dec 2017	1,100	80	–		21.4; 30/31	21.2; 30/31	14.1; 20/21	8.2; 9/10	6.1; 7/8	5.9; 7/8	–	21.3; 30/31	0.1
Feedback/El Nacional	4–8 Dec 2017	1,000	82.0	–		22.3; 32/33	21.3; 28/30	15.9; 21/22	7.4; 9	6.1; 6/7	7.4; 9	–	18.9; 28/30	1.0
SocioMétrica/El Español	27 Nov–8 Dec 2017	1,100	?	–		22.5; 32/33	21.5; 29/30	14.4; 21/22	7.4; 9	5.4; 6/7	5.5; 8	–	19.8; 27/28	1.0
GAD3/La Vanguardia	4–7 Dec 2017	1,000	82	–		21.5; 31/32	23.1; 30/31	16.5; 22	7.4; 8	7.1; 8	5.0; 5	–	18.2; 30	1.6
Feedback/El Nacional	3–7 Dec 2017	1,000	80.8	–		23.1; 33/35	23.0; 30/32	15.3; 20/21	8.0; 9/10	5.5; 6	7.1; 9	–	17.0; 24/26	0.1
Infortécnica/Segre	1–7 Dec 2017	1,216	?	–		23.3; 31/32	24.4; 32/34	16.3; 21/23	5.2; 6/8	5.6; 7/8	6.3; 8/9	–	18.9; 25/26	1.1
Celeste-Tel/eldiario.es	30 Nov–7 Dec 2017	800	71.3	–		22.9; 33	22.2; 30	16.1; 22	8.1; 9	6.7; 8	6.6; 8	–	16.2; 25	0.7
Feedback/El Nacional	1–5 Dec 2017	1,000	80.5	–		24.0; 35/36	22.8; 31/32	13.5; 17/18	9.3; 11	6.2; 6/7	6.4; 8	–	17.1; 24/26	1.2
GESOP/El Periódico	29 Nov–2 Dec 2017	800	80–82	–		20.5; 30/31	19.0; 25/26	19.0; 25/26	8.5; 9/10	5.8; 6/7	6.0; 7/8	–	19.3; 29/30	1.2
PP	30 Nov–1 Dec 2017	1,000	82	–		22.8; 36	21.3; 30	17.5; 23	7.8; 8	8.1; 10	4.5; 5	–	15.0; 23	1.5
Invymark/laSexta	27 Nov–1 Dec 2017	?	82	–		23.8; 35	20.5; 28	15.1; 22	7.1; 9	7.3; 9	6.2; 8	–	16.8; 24	3.3
SocioMétrica/El Español	27–30 Nov 2017	800	?	–		23.1; 35/37	20.5; 29/30	15.2; 20/22	6.4; 7	6.2; 7/8	6.0; 8	–	19.0; 25/27	2.6
IMOP/CIS	23–27 Nov 2017	3,000	?	–		20.8; 32	22.5; 31/32	16.0; 21	8.6; 9	5.8; 7	6.7; 9	–	16.9; 25/26	1.7
JM&A/Público	26 Nov 2017	?	80.3	–		25.7; 39	20.9; 28	14.5; 19	8.3; 9	7.7; 10	5.7; 8	–	14.7; 22	4.8
NC Report/La Razón	13–23 Nov 2017	1,000	71.1	–		24.1; 40	20.9; 29	14.7; 19	8.4; 10	9.3; 11	5.7; 6	–	13.6; 20	3.2
Advice Strategic/ECD	13–23 Nov 2017	2,500	76.2	–		26.7	18.3	14.0	9.2	7.9	6.1	–	12.2	8.4
Metroscopia/El País	20–22 Nov 2017	1,800	80	–		26.5; 39	25.3; 35	14.9; 19	6.7; 8	5.8; 6	5.9; 7	–	13.6; 21	1.2
GESOP/El Periódico	15–18 Nov 2017	800	?	–		23.9; 37/38	18.6; 24/25	18.1; 24/25	8.6; 9/10	5.7; 6/7	6.3; 7/8	–	16.5; 24/25	5.3
GAD3/ABC	13–16 Nov 2017	801	82	–		23.1; 35/37	22.3; 29/30	15.1; 19	7.6; 8/9	7.8; 10/11	5.6; 7/8	–	16.7; 24	0.8
JM&A/Público	5 Nov 2017	?	73.5	–	12.4; 18	28.2; 43	17.5; 24	14.4; 19	9.4; 11	8.8; 12	6.6; 8	–	–	10.7
NC Report/La Razón	30 Oct–3 Nov 2017	1,000	71	–	10.7; 17	26.3; 42	19.6; 27	13.6; 17	10.4; 13	10.5; 13	6.3; 6	–	–	6.7
GAD3/La Vanguardia	30 Oct–3 Nov 2017	1,233	81	–	10.4; 14/15	29.3; 45/46	20.6; 27/28	14.6; 19/20	8.3; 9/10	8.7; 10/12	6.3; 7/8	–	–	8.7
SocioMétrica/El Español	27–31 Oct 2017	1,000	75	–	10.1; 13	31.2; 48	18.3; 26	12.2; 16	10.0; 13	9.0; 12	5.7; 7	–	–	12.9
GESOP/CEO	16–29 Oct 2017	1,338	75	39.7; 60/63	(Note: Within JxSí.)		18.2; 25/26	13.9; 17/19	10.5; 12/14	8.3; 10/11	6.2; 8/9	–	–	21.5
Sigma Dos/El Mundo	23–26 Oct 2017	1,000	?	–	9.8; 13/15	26.4; 41/43	19.6; 26/28	15.1; 20/22	11.0; 13	8.7; 10/12	6.3; 7	–	–	6.8
NC Report/La Razón	16–21 Oct 2017	1,255	71.2	–	12.1; 18	24.6; 41	19.2; 26	13.1; 17	11.4; 14	10.5; 13	5.6; 6	–	–	5.4
GESOP/El Periódico	16–19 Oct 2017	800	?	–	12.0; 18/19	28.1; 43/44	16.8; 21/22	14.5; 20/21	9.0; 11/12	7.5; 9/10	7.8; 9/10	–	–	11.3
SocioMétrica/El Español	4–9 Oct 2017	800	?	–	8.1; 10	31.8; 51	18.3; 27	9.5; 14	12.0; 14	10.1; 13	6.3; 6	–	–	13.5
NC Report/La Razón	19–22 Sep 2017	1,255	?	–	12.7; 18	25.1; 41	17.2; 24	13.7; 17	11.6; 15	10.8; 13	5.6; 7	–	–	7.9
Celeste-Tel/eldiario.es	12–15 Sep 2017	800	?	–	13.6; 19/20	24.7; 38/40	17.4; 23/25	14.8; 18/19	12.2; 14/15	9.4; 11/12	5.9; 6/7	–	–	7.3
SocioMétrica/El Español	28 Aug–1 Sep 2017	700	?	–	12.7; 19	28.0; 44	17.5; 25	10.1; 12	10.4; 12	10.5; 14	6.8; 9	–	–	10.5
NC Report/La Razón	4–11 Aug 2017	1,255	70.1	–	13.9; 19	23.9; 40	17.5; 24	13.9; 17	12.1; 16	9.5; 12	6.5; 7	–	–	6.4
GESOP/CEO	26 Jun–11 Jul 2017	1,500	68	39.3; 60/63			15.4; 20/22	14.3; 17/20	12.4; 15/17	9.8; 11/13	5.4; 6/8	–	–	23.9
GAD3/La Vanguardia	23–29 Jun 2017	600	?	–	14.7; 23	28.7; 43	16.9; 23	13.8; 17	9.9; 12	9.1; 12	5.1; 5	–	–	11.8
DYM/El Confidencial	22–28 Jun 2017	531	?	–	9.0	30.9	16.0	13.6	11.8	10.3	6.3	–	–	14.9
GAD3/La Vanguardia	7–12 Apr 2017	601	?	–	15.1; 23	25.8; 39	16.1; 22	11.7; 15	12.2; 16	10.6; 14	5.1; 6	–	–	9.7
GESOP/CEO	6–21 Mar 2017	1,500	70	37.0; 58/60			16.1; 20/21	12.3; 15/16	15.3; 18/19	10.0; 13	5.9; 8	–	–	20.9
Metroscopia/El País	10–16 Mar 2017	1,200	?	–	11.0	29.2	16.0	13.0	16.0	5.8	4.1	–	–	13.2
Metroscopia/El País	10–16 Mar 2017	1,200	?	40.2			16.0	13.0	16.0	5.8	4.1	–	–	24.2
GAD3/La Vanguardia	2–5 Jan 2017	601	?	–	17.9; 27	25.1; 37	16.6; 24	11.4; 15	10.7; 14	9.8; 13	4.9; 5	–	–	7.2
NC Report/La Razón	16–23 Dec 2016	1,000	?	–	14.8; 20/22	24.1; 38/40	16.0; 22/24	12.1; 15/16	11.9; 13/15	9.1; 11/13	7.2; 8/9	2.2; 0	–	8.1
DYM/CEO	12–17 Dec 2016	1,047	70	37.6; 59/61			16.9; 22/24	13.8; 17/18	12.2; 14/15	9.0; 11/12	6.0; 6/8	–	–	20.7
GESOP/El Periódico	12–14 Dec 2016	800	?	–	11.5; 15/17	30.7; 48/50	13.5; 17/18	14.4; 19/21	12.3; 15/16	8.1; 10/11	5.2; 6	–	–	16.3
Opinòmetre/CEO	17 Oct–3 Nov 2016	1,500	70	37.4; 60/62			15.7; 20/21	11.7; 14/15	15.4; 19/20	10.0; 13/14	5.2; 6/8	–	–	21.7
ERC	2 Oct 2016	2,000	?	–	? 17/20	? 39/40	? 23/25	? 14/17	? 21/22	? 11/12	? 5/6	–	–	?
NC Report/La Razón	2–6 Aug 2016	1,255	70	–	17.2; 28	20.3; 29	16.7; 23	12.3; 15	13.9; 17	9.1; 11	7.5; 9	3.1; 3	–	3.1
NC Report/La Razón	2–6 Aug 2016	1,255	70	36.0; 57			16.7; 23	12.3; 15	13.9; 17	9.1; 11	7.7; 10	3.1; 2	–	19.3
Opinòmetre/CEO	28 Jun–13 Jul 2016	1,500	70	38.2; 60/62			14.8; 18/21	12.8; 16/17	16.8; 20/22	8.8; 11/12	5.2; 6/8	–	–	21.4
2016 general election	26 Jun 2016	—N/a	63.2	–	13.9 (21)	18.2 (27)	10.9 (14)	16.1 (22)	24.5 (32)	13.4 (19)	–	–	–	6.3
GAD3/La Vanguardia	13–16 Jun 2016	800	?	–	19.4; 31	21.5; 33	15.8; 22	13.0; 16	14.1; 18	8.8; 12	3.6; 3	–	–	2.1
GESOP/El Periódico	18–22 Apr 2016	1,600	?	–	13.3; 20/21	25.6; 40/41	16.2; 20/21	13.7; 18/19	12.3; 15/16	9.1; 12/13	6.5; 7/8	–	–	9.4
Opinòmetre/CEO	22 Feb–8 Mar 2016	1,500	70	35.8; 56/58			16.7; 22/23	12.2; 13/14	17.9; 21/23	7.0; 9/10	7.5; 9/11	–	–	17.9
Redondo & Asociados	3 Jan 2016	?	?	–	13.8; 22/23	14.7; 22/23	12.0; 15	14.4; 20	22.0; 31	10.6; 14	8.3; 10	–	–	7.3
ERC	31 Dec 2015	?	?	–	? 28/30	? 32/35	? 21/22	? 13/14	? 24/25	? 9/10	? 4/5	–	–	?
NC Report/La Razón	28–31 Dec 2015	1,255	72.5	35.6; 56			21.2; 29	12.1; 15	9.5; 12	8.4; 10	8.9; 11	2.9; 2	–	14.4
2015 general election	20 Dec 2015	—N/a	68.6	–	15.1 (24)	16.0 (24)	13.0 (18)	15.7 (21)	24.7 (33)	11.1 (15)	–	1.7 (0)	–	8.7
DYM/El Confidencial	30 Nov–3 Dec 2015	504	?	–	12.6	24.0	23.5	13.0	7.4	7.2	11.8	–	–	0.5
DYM/El Confidencial	30 Nov–3 Dec 2015	504	?	36.6			23.5	13.0	7.4	7.2	11.8	–	–	13.1
Feedback/La Vanguardia	20–27 Nov 2015	1,000	?	–	15.9; 24/25	21.1; 32/34	19.9; 27/29	13.5; 17/18	8.7; 10/12	8.3; 10/12	8.3; 10	2.2; 0	–	1.3
Feedback/La Vanguardia	20–27 Nov 2015	1,000	?	37.6; 59/61			19.7; 26/27	13.1; 16/17	8.3; 9/10	8.7; 11/12	9.0; 12	1.9; 0	–	17.9
GESOP/CEO	16–23 Nov 2015	1,050	72	38.1; 58/61			21.2; 28/31	12.4; 15/17	9.0; 9/11	7.4; 9/10	8.5; 10/11	–	–	16.9
NC Report/La Razón	26–31 Oct 2015	1,255	71.8	36.4; 58			20.9; 29	13.0; 16	7.6; 8	8.7; 11	8.6; 11	3.1; 2	–	15.5
Opinòmetre/CEO	5–27 Oct 2015	2,000	70	39.8; 61/63			18.0; 24/26	10.6; 14/15	9.3; 10/12	7.0; 8/10	11.1; 14/16	–	–	21.8
2015 regional election	27 Sep 2015	—N/a	74.9	39.6; 62			17.9; 25	12.7; 16	8.9; 11	8.5; 11	8.2; 10	2.5; 0	–	21.7

=== Voting preferences ===
The table below lists raw, unweighted voting preferences.

Color key:

Poll conducted after legal ban on opinion polls

Polling firm/Commissioner	Fieldwork date	Sample size	JxSí	CDC PDeCAT	ERC–CatSí	Cs	PSC	CatSíqueesPot CatComú–Podem	PP	CUP	JuntsxCat	Question	X mark	Lead
2017 regional election (Note: Does not include non-resident citizens.)	21 Dec 2017	—N/a	–		17.4	20.7	11.3	6.1	3.5	3.6	17.7	—N/a	18.2	3.0
GESOP/El Periòdic	17–19 Dec 2017	900	–		21.7	13.2	8.8	6.1	1.4	3.7	17.4	27.2		4.3
GESOP/El Periòdic	16–18 Dec 2017	800	–		21.8	12.2	8.5	6.6	1.3	3.9	17.8	27.8		4.0
GESOP/El Periòdic	15–17 Dec 2017	800	–		19.4	12.1	8.7	6.9	1.7	4.2	18.3	28.7		1.1
GESOP/El Periòdic	14–16 Dec 2017	800	–		19.3	11.2	9.4	6.6	2.3	5.6	17.2	28.4		2.1
GESOP/El Periòdic	13–15 Dec 2017	800	–		19.3	13.0	9.5	6.0	2.2	4.7	17.0	26.3	0.9	2.3
Feedback/El Nacional	7–14 Dec 2017	1,000	–		16.4	18.8	10.3	4.7	3.0	5.4	14.1	23.3	3.4	2.4
MyWord/Cadena SER	5–13 Dec 2017	1,004	–		20.2	12.8	10.7	9.5	0.8	3.3	12.8	25.2	3.2	7.4
Metroscopia/El País	4–13 Dec 2017	3,300	–		16.1	14.6	9.2	6.3	2.8	4.5	9.7	35.3		1.5
Feedback/El Nacional	5–12 Dec 2017	1,000	–		16.1	18.4	10.1	5.1	2.3	5.7	12.3	24.2	5.3	2.3
Feedback/El Nacional	4–8 Dec 2017	1,000	–		15.5	17.6	10.0	5.1	2.4	5.1	12.6	26.4	4.7	2.1
GAD3/La Vanguardia	4–7 Dec 2017	1,000	–		16.2	19.9	12.8	5.6	3.6	2.9	13.3	–	–	3.7
Feedback/El Nacional	3–7 Dec 2017	1,000	–		16.0	16.2	8.8	4.7	2.9	4.0	11.5	28.5	6.5	0.2
Infortécnica/Segre	1–7 Dec 2017	1,216	–		10.6	8.7	8.5	4.2	1.8	3.1	8.9	35.0	18.3	1.7
GESOP/El Periódico	29 Nov–2 Dec 2017	800	–		17.4	11.1	14.8	7.1	2.4	4.0	17.1	22.9	1.1	0.3
GESOP/ICPS	7–29 Nov 2017	1,200	–		21.3	11.7	11.8	9.7	3.0	4.1	12.6	19.4	4.3	8.7
IMOP/CIS	23–27 Nov 2017	3,000	–		17.1	13.2	12.1	6.6	2.5	4.9	13.7	25.3	1.8	3.4
GESOP/El Periódico	15–18 Nov 2017	800	–		18.3	10.5	13.6	7.0	2.6	3.5	14.4	26.9	1.0	3.9
GAD3/La Vanguardia	30 Oct–3 Nov 2017	1,233	–	6.7	19.1	13.9	10.7	5.5	4.1	3.8	–	–	–	5.2
GESOP/CEO	16–29 Oct 2017	1,338	35.2			7.0	9.9	10.1	1.8	4.7	–	19.6	6.3	25.1
GESOP/El Periódico	16–19 Oct 2017	800	–	8.9	22.1	8.0	9.0	6.9	2.4	6.0	–	26.3	6.3	13.1
SocioMétrica/El Español	28 Aug–1 Sep 2017	700	–	10.5	23.9	12.3	6.9	8.4	7.3	4.6	–	–	–	11.6
GESOP/CEO	26 Jun–11 Jul 2017	1,500	28.4			5.1	10.6	12.1	3.9	3.5	–	19.6	10.1	16.3
GAD3/La Vanguardia	23–29 Jun 2017	600	–	10.6	21.1	13.2	10.9	9.8	5.3	3.0	–	–	–	7.9
DYM/El Confidencial	22–28 Jun 2017	531	–	7.5	24.0	6.7	7.6	11.1	2.8	4.3	–	–	–	12.9
GAD3/La Vanguardia	7–12 Apr 2017	601	–	11.1	19.2	10.7	9.0	10.5	5.9	2.8	–	–	–	8.1
GESOP/CEO	6–21 Mar 2017	1,500	27.9			6.5	9.3	14.3	3.8	4.7	–	18.2	9.7	13.6
GAD3/La Vanguardia	2–5 Jan 2017	601	–	11.8	17.1	10.1	6.9	7.2	5.6	2.2	–	–	–	5.3
DYM/CEO	12–17 Dec 2016	1,047	27.2			6.0	9.3	9.6	2.2	3.5	–	28.1	6.4	17.6
GESOP/El Periódico	12–14 Dec 2016	800	–	8.6	25.8	6.5	9.9	8.9	3.0	3.4	–	17.8	7.5	15.9
Opinòmetre/CEO	17 Oct–3 Nov 2016	1,500	30.3			5.5	10.3	15.3	4.0	4.5	–	15.6	9.7	15.0
GESOP/ICPS	26 Sep–17 Oct 2016	1,200	–	12.5	22.4	7.5	9.1	14.6	4.0	4.0	–	12.7	9.3	7.8
Opinòmetre/CEO	28 Jun–13 Jul 2016	1,500	34.1			5.7	10.2	16.6	3.5	5.0	–	11.9	7.7	17.5
2016 general election	26 Jun 2016	—N/a	–	9.1	11.8	7.1	10.5	16.0	8.7	–	–	—N/a	34.4	4.2
GESOP/El Periódico	18–22 Apr 2016	1,600	–	7.7	18.1	7.8	5.8	10.2	3.1	5.0	–	29.1	8.5	7.9
Opinòmetre/CEO	22 Feb–8 Mar 2016	1,500	30.9			8.3	9.1	17.7	2.6	8.3	–	11.6	6.8	13.2
2015 general election	20 Dec 2015	—N/a	–	10.6	11.3	9.2	11.1	17.4	7.8	–	–	—N/a	29.0	6.1
GESOP/CEO	16–23 Nov 2015	1,050	31.1			13.0	8.6	7.8	3.0	9.0	–	18.8	4.3	18.1
Opinòmetre/CEO	5–27 Oct 2015	2,000	32.3			12.4	9.8	9.1	2.8	13.6	–	10.1	7.0	18.7
2015 regional election	27 Sep 2015	—N/a	30.5			13.8	9.8	6.9	6.6	6.3	–	—N/a	22.6	16.7

=== Victory preferences ===
The table below lists opinion polling on the victory preferences for each party in the event of a regional election taking place.

Polling firm/Commissioner	Fieldwork date	Sample size	ERC–CatSí	Cs	PSC	CatComú–Podem	PP	CUP	JuntsxCat	Other/ None	Question	Lead
SocioMétrica/El Español	3–11 Dec 2017	1,100	17.0	20.0	11.0	7.0	4.0	4.0	18.0	19.0		2.0
SocioMétrica/El Español	1–9 Dec 2017	1,100	16.0	19.0	13.0	8.0	7.0	5.0	18.0	14.0		1.0
SocioMétrica/El Español	27 Nov–8 Dec 2017	1,100	19.0	18.0	13.0	7.0	4.0	6.0	15.0	18.0		1.0
SocioMétrica/El Español	27–30 Nov 2017	800	20.0	14.0	12.0	6.0	4.0	8.0	14.0	22.0		6.0
IMOP/CIS	23–27 Nov 2017	3,000	21.0	14.5	14.6	8.5	2.4	3.4	15.5	4.2	16.0	5.5

=== Victory likelihood ===
The table below lists opinion polling on the perceived likelihood of victory for each party in the event of a regional election taking place.

Polling firm/Commissioner	Fieldwork date	Sample size	ERC–CatSí	Cs	PSC	CatComú–Podem	PP	CUP	JuntsxCat	Other/ None	Question	Lead
IMOP/CIS	23–27 Nov 2017	3,000	47.3	6.3	4.2	1.2	3.3	0.5	12.5	1.2	23.5	34.8
GESOP/El Periódico	15–18 Nov 2017	800	42.8	4.5	3.1	0.5	2.8	–	11.3	0.0	35.2	31.5

=== Preferred President ===
The table below lists opinion polling on leader preferences to become president of the Government of Catalonia.

Color key:

Poll conducted after legal ban on opinion polls

Polling firm/Commissioner	Fieldwork date	Sample size									Other/ None/ Not care	Question	Lead
Polling firm/Commissioner	Fieldwork date	Sample size	Puigdem. JuntsxCat	Junqueras ERC	Rovira ERC	Arrimadas Cs	Iceta PSC	Domènech CeC–P	Albiol PP	Riera CUP	Other/ None/ Not care	Question	Lead
GESOP/El Periòdic	17–19 Dec 2017	900	28.9	19.1	–	15.9	14.1	6.8	1.5	1.3	12.4		9.8
GESOP/El Periòdic	16–18 Dec 2017	800	29.8	19.7	–	15.1	13.3	5.7	1.7	1.5	13.2		10.1
GESOP/El Periòdic	15–17 Dec 2017	800	30.4	18.3	–	14.1	13.6	5.7	1.5	2.0	14.4		12.1
GESOP/El Periòdic	14–16 Dec 2017	800	28.7	19.4	–	13.4	13.5	6.0	1.5	2.9	14.6		9.3
GESOP/El Periòdic	13–15 Dec 2017	800	27.9	16.9	–	14.3	13.1	6.3	1.2	2.6	18.7		11.0
GESOP/El Periódico	12–14 Dec 2017	800	27.6	16.4	–	12.8	9.9	7.2	1.2	2.7	22.2		11.2
SocioMétrica/El Español	1–14 Dec 2017	1,500	25.0	14.0	4.0	21.0	13.0	–	–	–	–	–	4.0
MyWord/Cadena SER	5–13 Dec 2017	1,004	25.4	18.1	–	15.8	13.2	11.1	1.9	1.5	–	13.0	7.3
SocioMétrica/El Español	3–11 Dec 2017	1,100	26.0	14.0	5.0	21.0	13.0	6.0	4.0	2.0	9.0		5.0
SocioMétrica/El Español	1–9 Dec 2017	1,100	26.0	11.0	7.0	20.0	11.0	5.0	4.0	2.0	14.0		6.0
SocioMétrica/El Español	27 Nov–8 Dec 2017	1,100	24.0	10.0	9.0	20.0	11.0	4.0	2.0	3.0	17.0		4.0
GAD3/La Vanguardia	4–7 Dec 2017	1,000	25.0	9.7	–	21.0	11.5	4.5	2.3	0.8	25.2		4.0
SocioMétrica/El Español	27–30 Nov 2017	800	22.0	10.0	10.0	18.0	9.0	3.0	2.0	5.0	21.0		4.0
IMOP/CIS	23–27 Nov 2017	3,000	28.1	15.6	0.2	14.6	15.8	6.2	2.6	1.5	5.0	10.6	12.3
GESOP/El Periódico	15–18 Nov 2017	800	30.8	13.1	–	12.4	15.6	6.0	1.6	1.4	8.6	10.6	15.2

== Voter turnout ==
The table below shows registered voter turnout during the election. Figures for election day do not include non-resident citizens, while final figures do.

Province	Time (Election day)									Final		
Province	13:00			18:00			20:00			Final		
Province	2015	2017	+/–	2015	2017	+/–	2015	2017	+/–	2015	2017	+/–
Barcelona	34.72%	34.59%	−0.13	63.21%	68.59%	+5.38	77.61%	82.30%	+4.69	75.03%	79.32%	+4.29
Girona	38.47%	35.36%	−3.11	65.08%	68.48%	+3.40	77.99%	81.51%	+3.52	75.94%	79.16%	+3.22
Lleida	33.75%	34.08%	+0.33	61.11%	66.04%	+4.93	76.79%	80.62%	+3.83	73.63%	77.11%	+3.48
Tarragona	35.56%	35.11%	−0.45	61.78%	66.84%	+5.06	76.00%	80.41%	+4.41	74.19%	78.41%	+4.22
Total	35.10%	34.69%	–0.41	63.12%	68.26%	+5.14	77.43%	81.94%	+4.51	74.95%	79.09%	+4.14

== Results ==
=== Overall ===
← Summary of the 21 December 2017 Parliament of Catalonia election results →
Parties and alliances	Popular vote			Seats	
Parties and alliances	Votes	%	±pp	Total	+/−
Citizens–Party of the Citizenry (Cs)	1,109,732	25.35	+7.44	36	+11
Together for Catalonia (JuntsxCat)^{1}	948,233	21.66	n/a	34	+3
Republican Left–Catalonia Yes (ERC–CatSí)^{1}	935,861	21.38	n/a	32	+6
Socialists' Party of Catalonia (PSC–PSOE)	606,659	13.86	+1.14	17	+1
Catalonia in Common–We Can (CatComú–Podem)^{2}	326,360	7.46	−1.48	8	−3
Popular Unity Candidacy (CUP)	195,246	4.46	−3.75	4	−6
People's Party (PP)	185,670	4.24	−4.25	4	−7
Animalist Party Against Mistreatment of Animals (PACMA)	38,743	0.89	+0.16	0	±0
Zero Cuts–Green Group (Recortes Cero–GV)	10,287	0.24	−0.11	0	±0
For a Fairer World (PUM+J)	577	0.01	New	0	±0
Republican Dialogue (Diàleg)	0	0.00	New	0	±0
Together for Yes (Independents) (JxSí)^{1}	n/a	n/a	n/a	0	−5
Blank ballots	19,431	0.44	−0.09		
Total	4,376,799			135	±0
Valid votes	4,376,799	99.63	+0.02		
Invalid votes	16,092	0.37	−0.02		
Votes cast / turnout	4,392,891	79.09	+4.14		
Abstentions	1,161,564	20.91	−4.14		
Registered voters	5,554,455				
Sources
Footnotes: ^{1} Within the Junts pel Sí alliance in the 2015 election. Totals for JuntsxCat are compared to CDC. Totals for ERC–CatSí include DC and MES. Also including JuntsxCat and ERC aligned independents from 2015.; ^{2} Catalonia in Common–We Can results are compared to Catalonia Yes We Can totals in the 2015 election.

Popular vote
Cs	25.35%
JuntsxCat	21.66%
ERC–CatSí	21.38%
PSC–PSOE	13.86%
CeC–P	7.46%
CUP	4.46%
PP	4.24%
Others	1.13%
Blank ballots	0.44%

Seats
Cs	26.67%
JuntsxCat	25.19%
ERC–CatSí	23.70%
PSC–PSOE	12.59%
CeC–P	5.93%
CUP	2.96%
PP	2.96%

=== Distribution by constituency ===
Constituency	Cs		JxCat		ERC		PSC		CeC–P		CUP		PP	
Constituency	%	S	%	S	%	S	%	S	%	S	%	S	%	S
Barcelona	26.4	24	19.0	17	20.6	18	15.1	13	8.4	7	4.4	3	4.3	3
Girona	19.5	4	36.7	7	21.7	4	8.6	1	4.0	−	5.3	1	2.9	−
Lleida	17.0	3	32.5	6	26.7	5	9.0	1	3.9	−	5.0	−	4.5	−
Tarragona	27.4	5	21.7	4	23.7	5	11.8	2	5.4	1	4.0	−	4.6	1
Total	25.4	36	21.7	34	21.4	32	13.9	17	7.5	8	4.5	4	4.2	4

== Aftermath ==
=== Initial reactions ===
The results were announced after polls in the region closed, with Citizens (Cs) becoming the largest party in the regional parliament, but pro-independence parties maintained a majority of seats. Cs gained eleven seats in the election under the leadership of Inés Arrimadas, bringing its total to 36. This meant that the largest party in the region was overtly and directly opposed to independence. This increase in the vote share left it 32 seats short of a majority in the parliament.

Together for Catalonia (JuntsxCat), the party of exiled former president Carles Puigdemont, also saw an increase in its seat total, emerging as the second-largest party in the region with 34 seats. This represented an increase of three seats for the party, which stood on a staunchly pro-independence platform. While the party lost its position as the largest in parliament, the improved performance of the Republican Left of Catalonia (ERC), a left-wing party also campaigning for independence from Spain, helped ensure that JuntsxCat would maintain its dominant role in regional politics. ERC, under the stewardship of Oriol Junqueras, who served as vice president under Puigdemont, secured 32 seats, leaving the two largest pro-independence parties a mere two seats short of re-establishing a coalition and holding their majority. These seats were provided by the Popular Unity Candidacy (CUP), which, in spite of a severely diminished performance from the previous election, still held four seats, courtesy of a strong performance in Barcelona. This ensured that pro-independence parties were able to maintain their majority in the parliament. Five independent politicians, who were participants in the Junts pel Sí bloc but not party members, lost their seats. Consequently, despite both JuntsxCat and ERC increasing their number of seats, the majority in the parliament for independence was diminished by two seats, but nonetheless maintained. The result was hailed by Puigdemont as a "slap in the face" for Madrid and for Mariano Rajoy.

=== Government formation ===
As a result of pro-independence parties securing a parliamentary majority, Arrimadas announced she would not try to form a government on her own, instead waiting and see how negotiations between pro-independence parties evolved. As the candidate of the most-voted party within the pro-independence bloc, Puigdemont intended to be re-elected as president, but this was hampered by the fact he risked being arrested by Spanish authorities upon returning from his self-imposed exile in Brussels, as Spain's authorities considered him a fugitive. Further, pro-independence parties could only command 62 seats—six short of a majority—as in practice eight of their elected deputies were either in Brussels with Puigdemont or in preventive detention.

One of these was Junqueras, who sought to become president himself on the grounds that he could be granted prison permits that allowed him to attend parliamentary plenary sessions, whereas Puigdemont would have it near-impossible to be invested from Brussels—Parliament's regulations required for any candidate to the office to be physically present in the investiture—or to rule Catalonia from abroad. Members of JuntsxCat insisted that they would only vote for Puigdemont as president, even if that meant forcing a new election, and claimed that they intended to pressure Mariano Rajoy into allowing Puigdemont's return.

After the Catalan parliament elected Roger Torrent as new speaker, Puigdemont was proposed as candidate for re-election as Catalan president. Facing arrest on possible charges of rebellion, sedition and misuse of public funds, the Catalan parliament delayed Puigdemont's investiture after Constitutional Court ruled that he could not assume the presidency from abroad. With other pro-independence leaders assuring the pro-independence movement should outlive Puigdemont in order to end the political deadlock, the former Catalan president announced on 1 March he would step his claim aside in order to allow detained activist Jordi Sànchez, from his Together for Catalonia alliance, to become president instead. As Spain's Supreme Court did not allow Sànchez to be freed from jail to attend his investiture ceremony, Sànchez ended up giving up his candidacy on 21 March in favour of former Catalan government spokesman Jordi Turull, who was also under investigation for his role in the referendum.

Investiture; Nomination of Jordi Turull (PDeCAT)
Ballot →	22 March 2018	24 March 2018
Required majority →	68 out of 135	~~Simple~~
Yes: • JuntsxCat (33); • ERC (31)	64 / 135	Cancelled (as a result of candidate Jordi Turull being put in preventive detention)
No: • Cs (36); • PSC (17); • CatComú–Podem (8); • PP (4)	65 / 135	Cancelled (as a result of candidate Jordi Turull being put in preventive detention)
Abstentions: • CUP (4)	4 / 135	Cancelled (as a result of candidate Jordi Turull being put in preventive detention)
Absentees: • JuntsxCat (1); • ERC (1)	2 / 135	Cancelled (as a result of candidate Jordi Turull being put in preventive detention)

Turull was defeated in the first ballot of a hastily convened investiture session held on 22 March, with only his Together for Catalonia alliance and ERC voting for him and the Popular Unity Candidacy abstaining, resulting in a 64–65 defeat. The next day and less than 24 hours before he was due to attend the second ballot, the Supreme Court announced that thirteen senior Catalan leaders—including Turull—would be charged with rebellion over their roles in the 2017 unilateral referendum and subsequent declaration of independence. In anticipation of this ruling and in order to avoid appearing in court, Marta Rovira—ERC's general secretary and deputy leader to jailed Oriol Junqueras—fled the country to Switzerland in "self-exile". This prompted the Court to rule that Turull and several others would be remanded in custody without bail. As a result, the Parliament speaker Roger Torrent cancelled Turull's second investiture ballot. Turull's first ballot nonetheless started the clock towards automatic parliamentary dissolution, meaning a new regional election would be called for 15 July if no candidate was elected as Catalan president before 22 May.

On 12 May, Quim Torra did not earn the absolute majority support to be invested president, with 66 votes against 65 in the first round (the absolute majority was 68 votes, from 135 total votes). On 14 May, Torra was elected as new Catalan president in the second round of vote, with the same results, when only a simple majority was necessary.

Investiture; Nomination of Quim Torra (INDEP)
Ballot →	12 May 2018	14 May 2018
Required majority →	68 out of 135	Simple
Yes: • JuntsxCat (34); • ERC (32)	66 / 135	66 / 135
No: • Cs (36); • PSC (17); • CatComú–Podem (8); • PP (4)	65 / 135	65 / 135
Abstentions: • CUP (4)	4 / 135	4 / 135
Absentees	0 / 135	0 / 135

=== 2019 motion of no confidence ===
Motion of no confidence Nomination of Lorena Roldán (Cs)
Ballot →	7 October 2019
Required majority →	68 out of 135
Yes: • Cs (36); • PP (4)	40 / 135
No: • JuntsxCat (33); • ERC (31); • CatComú–Podem (8); • CUP (4)	76 / 135
Abstentions: • PSC (17)	17 / 135
Absentees: • JuntsxCat (1); • ERC (1)	2 / 135

== Bibliography ==
- Ley Orgánica 4/1979, de 18 de diciembre, de Estatuto de Autonomía de Cataluña (Organic Law 4/1979). Official State Gazette (in Spanish). 18 December 1979. BOE-A-1979-30178.
- Ley Orgánica 5/1985, de 19 de junio, del Régimen Electoral General (Organic Law 5/1985). Official State Gazette (in Spanish). 19 June 1985 [version as of 1 November 2016]. BOE-A-1985-11672.
- Ley Orgánica 6/2006, de 19 de julio, de reforma del Estatuto de Autonomía de Cataluña (Organic Law 6/2006). Official State Gazette (in Spanish). 19 July 2006 [version as of 19 January 2011]. BOE-A-2006-13087.
- Ley 13/2008, de 5 de noviembre, de la presidencia de la Generalidad y del Gobierno (Law 13/2008). Official State Gazette (in Spanish). 5 November 2008 [version as of 20 July 2015]. BOE-A-2008-19526.
- Real Decreto 946/2017, de 27 de octubre, de convocatoria de elecciones al Parlamento de Cataluña y de su disolución (Royal Decree 946/2017). Official State Gazette (in Spanish). 27 October 2017. BOE-A-2017-12330.
