= Together for Catalonia =

Together for Catalonia (Catalan: Junts per Catalunya) may refer to:

- Together for Catalonia (2017), a defunct electoral alliance and party in Catalonia formed by the Catalan European Democratic Party between 2017 and 2020
- Together for Catalonia (2020), a party established in 2020 by split elements from the Catalan European Democratic Party
