= Martí Pujol =

Spanish landowner and politician

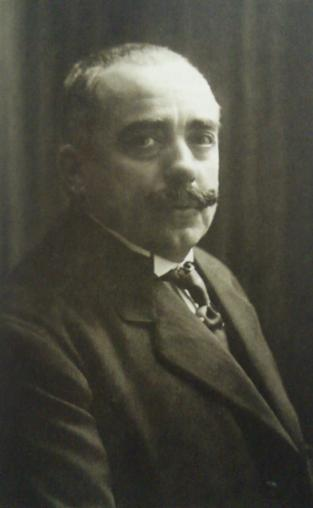
Picture of Martí Pujol

Martí Pujol i Planas (1859-1926) was a Spanish landowner and politician, who was mayor of Badalona twice, from 1906 to 1910 and from 1912 to 1913.

Born in 1859 in the village of Badalona. He was an important landowner whose lands were next to stream of Canyet, in the current neighbourhood of Bufalà. His manor house was known as Can Martinet Pujol. He was one of the founders of the Foment de l'Agricultura in 1884, a local agrarian association appeared during the plague of the phylloxera which seriously affected and destructed many vineyards.

He participated in local politics, as a catalanist and militant of the Regionalist League of Catalonia. In 1892 he was representative for Badalona in the assembly that wrote Bases de Manresa. After a political and administrative period of chaos in the city council because of caciquism, in 1905 he was elected councilor along other members of their political candidacy formed in 1899, linked to a catalanist local center named Gent Nova. He was mayor from 1906 to 1910. During his term were created different public institutions like Casa Empar for orphans, or a School of Agriculture, Arts and Jobs. There were also urbanistic reforms, the most important was the urbanization of the Canyet stream, for which he ceded an important amount of land. Pujol was very popular among citizens and become again mayor of the city from 1912 to 1913.

He died in Badalona in 1926 and was buried in the current old cemetery of Badalona. After his death, on 29 October 1930 the City Council named the avenue that covered all the stream of Canyet with his name as an act of homage for the cession of terrains to urbanise the street.
