= Action for the Republic (Catalonia) =

Action for the Republic Acció per la República
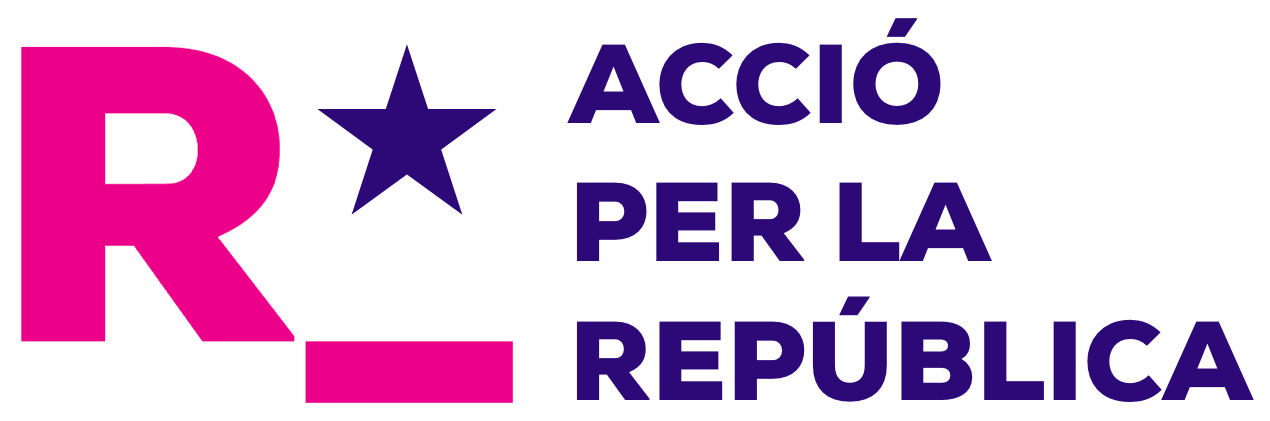
- Abbreviation: AxR
- President: Araceli Esquerra
- Spokesperson: Aurora Madaula
- Founded: 10 July 2018 (JuntsxRep); 28 November 2019 (AxR)
- Dissolved: 30 November 2025
- Merged into: Left Movement
- Headquarters: C/ Sancho de Ávila, 176, bjs. 08018, Barcelona
- Ideology: Catalan independence Republicanism; Ecologism; Feminism; Progressivism; Unilateralism
- Political position: Centre-left
- Regional affiliation: Together for Catalonia (2017) (2019–20); Together for Catalonia (2020) (2020–2025)
- Colors: Pink; Violet
- Slogan: La veu de la independència ("The voice of independence")

Website
- www.acciorepublica.cat

Action for the Republic (Catalan: Acció per la República, AxR) was a Catalan nationalist and progressive political party in Catalonia, founded by independent deputies of the Parliament of Catalonia grouped into the Together for the Republic (Catalan: Junts per la República, JuntsxRep) internal current within the Together for Catalonia (JxCat) alliance. The party defined itself ideologically as independentist, republican, ecologist, feminist and progressive, and had the Dutch Democrats 66 party as its ideological referent. It advocated for a "broad republican and patriotic front" together with other pro-independence parties while supporting "a policy of rupture".

Notable party members included former Catalan minister and city councillor in Barcelona Ferran Mascarell and historian Agustí Colomines.

The party merged with Left Movement in November 2025.

== History ==
The party has its roots in the "Together for the Republic" (Catalan: Junts per la República) internal current within the Together for Catalonia (JxCat) parliamentary group in the Parliament of Catalonia, which had been established in March 2018 by unaligned deputies Elsa Artadi, Eduard Pujol, Josep Riera, Aurora Madaula and Antoni Morral. Among the current's political initiatives was a proposal in March 2019 for both JxCat and Republican Left of Catalonia (ERC) to form a single, unitary parliamentary group in both chambers of the Cortes Generales.

The transformation of the Together for the Republic current into a political party was announced on 25 July 2019, with its founding process starting in November 2019. The party has explicitly rejected the reorganization of the post-Democratic Convergence of Catalonia's space around the Catalan European Democratic Party (PDeCAT), instead defending former Catalan president Carles Puigdemont's "legitimacy" to take over the leadership of the Catalan pro-independence cause, with many AxR members having also joined Puigdemont's National Call for the Republic (CNxR). On 1 July 2020, AxR advocated for the JxCat alliance to be transformed into a platform comprising the CNxR, independent collectives as well as itself, just hours before Puigdemont's announcement of a new political party to be publicly presented on 25 July.

On 19 July 2020, AxR held an extraordinary assembly where it voted in favour of urging party members to "individually" join Puigdemont's new Together for Catalonia and "actively participate in the process of constituting the new party".
