= Àlex Pastor =

Spanish politician

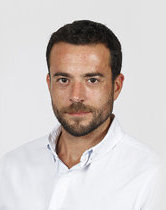

Alejandro Pastor López (born 17 July 1979) is a Spanish former politician. As a member of the Socialists' Party of Catalonia (PSC), he was elected to Badalona City Council in 2015. He became mayor in 2018, after presenting a motion of no confidence in his predecessor Dolors Sabater. He resigned on 22 April 2020 after being arrested and eventually convicted of drink driving and assaulting the police. He left politics and did not make a public comment until December 2025, when he spoke of his poor mental health and alcoholism.

== Early life and career ==
Pastor has degrees in Labour Relations and Labour Sciences. He was a member of a students' organisation and also active in the youth wing of the PSC. He first took part in an election to the city council in 1995, but otherwise spent his early adulthood as a civil servant in a department related to employment.

In 2015, Pastor was elected to the city council, but amidst a poor result for his party. The left-wing, anti-independence PSC had to choose between backing the left-wing and pro-independence candidate Dolors Sabater (Popular Unity Candidacy, CUP) or the right-wing, anti-independence incumbent Xavier García Albiol (People's Party, PP) as mayor; they chose Sabater.

In 2018, Pastor tabled a motion of no confidence in Sabater. The motion carried on 20 June with support of the three PSC councillors, the ten from the PP and the one from Citizens. In the 2019 elections, he retained his office when Sabater withdrew her candidacy and the separatist parties voted for Pastor.

== Resignation and conviction ==
On 21 April 2020, Pastor was stopped by the Mossos d'Esquadra for driving erratically. Police reports said that he repeatedly brought up his position as an excuse to go free, refused to take a breathalyser test and began assaulting officers, including biting. He was additionally arrested for breaking the COVID-19 lockdown. Suspended by his party, he resigned his office the following day. Days before his offences, Pastor said of people who broke lockdown "there are people who think they're smarter than the rest and that they don't have to abide by the rules. They don't put their health at risk, but ours". Sources close to Pastor said that his job and his personal life had caused him physical and psychological harm.

In February 2021, Pastor went to court in Barcelona. He was convicted and fined €800 and banned from driving for 16 months. He was sentenced to eight months in prison, suspended due to his lack of previous convictions and his agreement to pay damages.

In December 2025, Pastor made his first public comments since his resignation, in an interview with El Periódico de Catalunya. He said that he had normal mental health before becoming mayor, but social phobia led to depression, alcoholism and suicidality. He said that people deserve second chances, but public officials cannot be afforded them.
