= Joaquim Palay =

Spanish businessperson and politician (1855–1928)

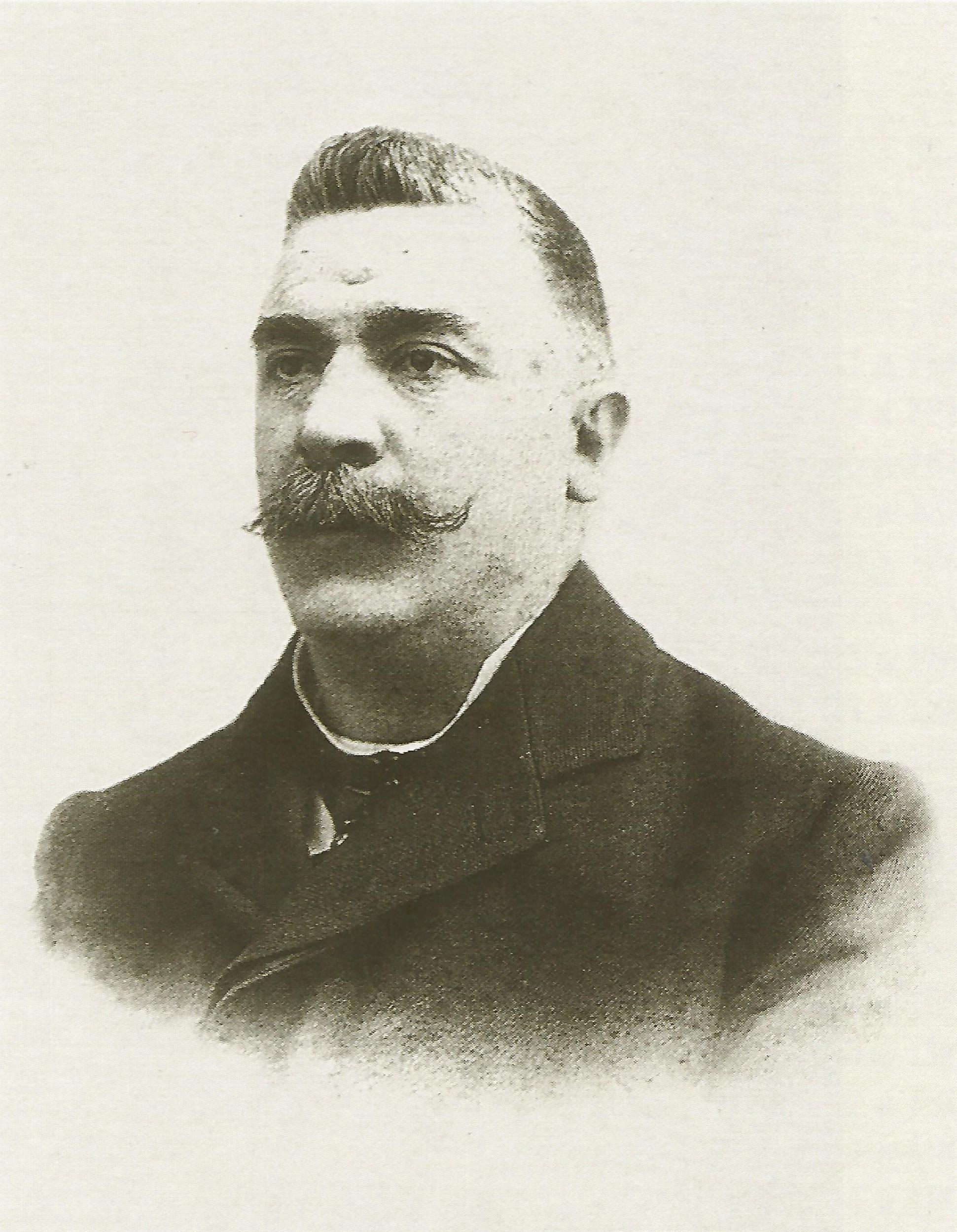
Picture of Joaquim Palay

Joaquim Palay i Jaurés (1855–1928) was a Spanish industrialist and politician born in Uruguay, who was mayor of Badalona twice (1894–1895 and 1897–1898).

Born in 1855 in Montevideo. He was son of Pere Palay and Antònia Jaurés, a couple from Catalonia who emigrated to Uruguay. They returned in 1858 and established the first cookie factory of Spain in Badalona. Joaquim was put in charge of the business along his brother Emili in 1889 and enjoyed a good period of sales thanks to the high demand of the Spanish colonies in America; however, with their loss in 1898 the factory had losses and closed at the beginning of the new century.

In the political sphere, he was supporter and local representative of the Conservative Party in Badalona. Palay has been considered and introductor of caciquism. During his leadership of the conservatives of Badalona he was the main antagonist of the liberal counterpart, Pere Renom. He acted as mayor of Badalona in two periods, during the second term in 1897 Badalona received the title of city. After this and the second mayoralty of Renom, he was elected again as councilor in 1899. However, he starred violent confrontations with Pere Renom followers. This confrontations had their peak in July 1, when Palay was going to become the new mayor. That day Palay was attacked by a sereno in the entrance of the town hall, and the tension between conservative and liberal supporters explode and they fought in the town square. As a result, were twenty injuries and three deaths. The civil governor decided to suspend the city councilors and the conflict was brought to trial that lasted until 1904, when Palay was found guilty of exciting his followers to attack the liberals.

After 1899, the city council was dominated by mayors and councilors followers of Palay, starting a period of chaos in local government that ended with an administrative inspection from the civil governor, who suspended the city council in 1905. He was elected councilor again in 1909, although he lost the election to a coalition of catalanists parties. The next year abandoned politics because of his deafness.

Retired of public life the last years of his life, he died in El Masnou on May 29, 1928.
