= Carles Riera i Albert =

Catalan sociologist and politician

Carles Riera
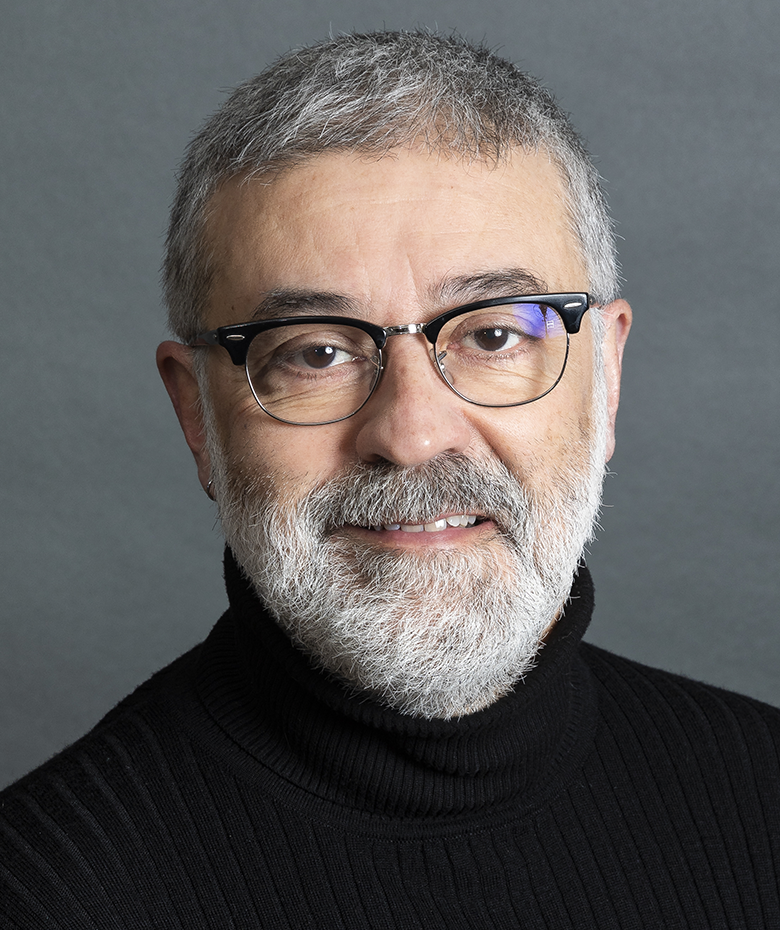
- Carles Riera in January 2021

Member of the Parliament of Catalonia
- In office 25 October 2016 – 19 March 2024
- Constituency: Barcelona

Personal details
- Born: Carles Riera i Albert; 1 April 1960 (age 66) Barcelona, Catalonia, Spain
- Party: Popular Unity Candidacy
- Education: Autonomous University of Barcelona; Polytechnic University of Catalonia
- Occupation: Social and political activist
- Profession: Sociologist

Carles Riera i Albert (born 1960) is a Catalan sociologist and politician.

During the 1980s he was a member and spokesman for the Call to Solidarity in Defense of Catalan Language, Culture and Nation, in the 90s he was a member of the secretariat of the People's Unity Assembly and currently is a member of Endavant. In the Catalan elections held on 27 September 2015, he formed part of the Popular Unity Candidacy–Constituent Call coalition which won 10 seats in the 135-member Parliament of Catalonia. He led the Popular Unity Candidacy party in the 2017 Catalan elections, in which won 4 seats.
