= Pere Renom =

Spanish politician (1850-1911)

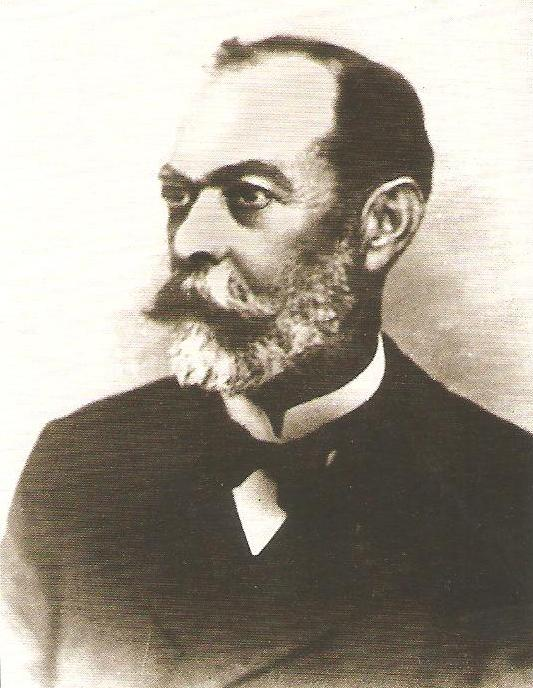
Picture of Pere Renom

Pere Renom i Riera (1850-1911) was a Spanish writer and politician, mayor of Badalona twice (1893-1894 and 1898-1899).

Born in Badalona in 1847. As a writer and journalist collaborated with various newspapers from Badalona, mainly republican, catalanist and satirical ones. In fact, he was a collaborator and supporter of El Eco de Badalona, the first newspaper of the village in 1868. In 1879 he founded L'Esparvé, a satirical newspaper that lasted until 1881 and the first written entirely in Catalan. He is also known for their short theatre plays written in Spanish and Catalan like Los intransigentes (1877), Un bateig fracassat (1881), La bandera dels tres tombs (1882) or Les pescadores de Badalona (1889).

In the political sphere was a supporter of the Liberal Party and its local representative. Was mayor of Badalona first during six months in 1893. He starred violent confrontations with the conservative local reprensentative, Joaquim Palay. This confrontations had their peak 1 July 1899, the day that Palay was going to become the new mayor. After a failed intend to attack Palay by a sereno in the entrance of the town hall, the tension between conservative and liberal supporters explode and they fought in the town square. As a result, were twenty injuries and three deaths. The civil governor decided to suspend the city councilors and the conflict was brought to trial that lasted until 1904, when Renom was absolved.

He died in Badalona in 1911.
