= Guanyem Catalunya =

Let's Win Catalonia Guanyem Catalunya
- President: Dolors Sabater
- Founded: 1 December 2020
- Split from: Barcelona en Comú
- Ideology: Republicanism; Municipalism; Environmentalism; Feminism; Catalan independence
- Political position: Left-wing
- Parliament of Catalonia: 0 / 135

Guanyem Catalunya (English: Let's Win Catalonia) is a political party in Catalonia founded by the former mayor of Badalona, Dolors Sabater.

== History ==
The party was founded on 1 December 2020, with the aim of "exporting municipalism to Parliament" and "carry on the good work done in the municipalities of Badalona, Girona, Ripollet and Cerdanyola del Vallès." Previously, a similar space called Municipalistes per la República des de Baix (English: Municipalists for the Republic from Below) was founded, led by Dolors Sabater herself, Carles Escolà (mayor of Cerdanyola) and José María Osuna (mayor of Ripollet).

On 3 December 2020, the CUP proposed to Guanyem a unitary candidacy to run in the 2021 Catalan regional election, and they also made this proposal to the Anticapitalistes and Communists of Catalonia. On 12 December, an agreement was reached between the CUP and Guanyem to run under the same umbrella in the elections. One of the most important points of this agreement is the candidacy for Barcelona, which will be led by Dolors Sabater.

== Electoral performance ==
Parliament of Catalonia
| Election | Votes | % | # | Seats | +/– | Leading candidate | Status in legislature |
| 2021 | Within CUP–G | | | 1 / 135 | New | Dolors Sabater | Confidence and supply |
