= Dolors Sabater =

Catalan teacher, social activist and politician

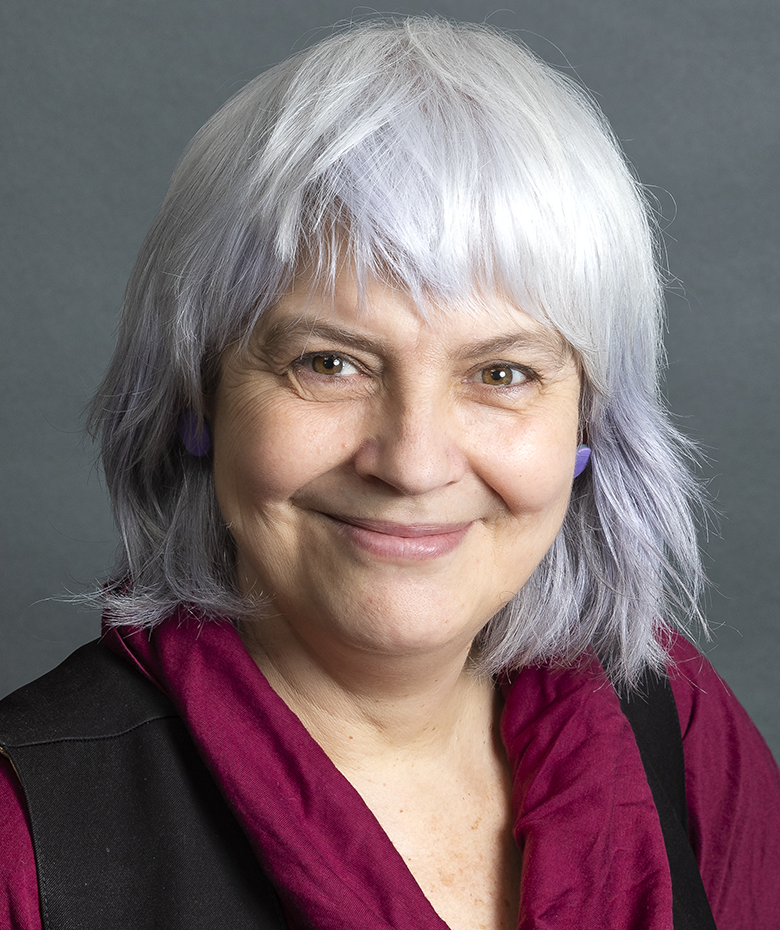
- Dolors Sabater in January 2021

Mayor of Badalona
- In office 13 June 2015 – 20 June 2018
- Preceded by: Xavier García Albiol
- Succeeded by: Àlex Pastor López

Member of the Parliament of Catalonia
- In office 12 March 2021 – 22 December 2023
- Succeeded by: Laure Vega
- Constituency: Barcelona

Member of the Badalona City Council
- Incumbent
- Assumed office 17 June 2023
- In office 13 June 2015 – 9 March 2021

Personal details
- Born: Maria Dolors Sabater Puig; 28 November 1960 (age 65) Badalona, Catalonia, Spain
- Party: Guanyem Catalunya (since 2020)
- Other political affiliations: Guanyem Badalona en Comú (2015–2020)
- Occupation: Teacher
- Website: blocs.mesvilaweb.cat/mariadolors/

Maria Dolors Sabater Puig (Catalan pronunciation: [duˈlos səβəˈte] born 28 November 1960) is a Catalan teacher, social activist and politician from Spain. She was mayor of Badalona from 2015 to 2018, and elected to the Parliament of Catalonia in 2021.

== Career ==
Sabater is a teacher with a focus on special needs education. Her brother Frederic has a lifelong intellectual disability, and she has been vocal for disability rights.

In June 2015, Sabater became mayor of her hometown of Badalona, replacing People's Party incumbent Xavier García Albiol. Her localist party Guanyem Badalona en Comú was supported by larger left-wing parties. Despite her republican and separatist views, Sabater took the standard oath of office swearing loyalty to the Spanish Constitution, adding "until the working Catalan people, exercising their democratic will, decide to construct the freer, more sovereign and more socially just Catalan Republic". In May 2018, she lost a vote of no confidence, and in June she was replaced by Àlex Pastor of the Socialists' Party.

In May 2020, Pastor resigned following an arrest for assault of a member of the Mossos d'Esquadra. An agreement was tabled that her party and the Socialists agree that Sabater would be mayor for 18 months and the Socialist Rubén Guijarro for the next 18, but this failed and García Albiol returned to power instead.

In December 2020, Sabater was announced as the candidate for regional president for the Popular Unity Candidacy party and Guanyem Catalunya electoral grouping, for the Catalan elections on 14 February 2021. The party gained 6.69% of the votes and nine seats in the Parliament of Catalonia.
