= Together for Catalonia (2017) =

Political alliance in Spain

Together for Catalonia Junts per Catalunya
- Abbreviation: JxCat; JuntsxCat
- Chairperson: Albert Batet
- Spokesperson: Eduard Pujol
- Founded: 13 November 2017 (alliance)
- Registered: 11 July 2018 (party)
- Dissolved: 22 December 2020
- Preceded by: Junts pel Sí
- Succeeded by: Together for Catalonia (2020)
- Headquarters: C/ Calàbria, 169, 1ª 08015, Barcelona
- Ideology: Catalan independence; Liberalism
- Political position: Big tent
- European Parliament group: Non-Inscrits
- Colors: Pink
- Members: See list of members

Website
- juntspercatalunya.cat

Together for Catalonia (Catalan: Junts per Catalunya, JxCat or JuntsxCat) was an electoral and parliamentary alliance in Catalonia, registered as a political party in the interior ministry in July 2018, originally envisaged as a platform comprising the Catalan European Democratic Party (PDeCAT), successor of the late Democratic Convergence of Catalonia (CDC), and independents and centered around the candidacy of former Catalan president Carles Puigdemont ahead of the 2017 Catalan regional election. Some of these independents went on to form the Action for the Republic (AxR) political party, which is also part of the alliance in the Parliament of Catalonia.

The alliance was maintained for the April and November 2019 Spanish general elections, as well as for the European Parliament and local elections held on 26 May 2019. The alliance's trademark is currently the subject of a political dispute between the PDeCAT and Puigdemont, the latter having used it as the foundation for a new party using the label.

== History ==
"Together for Catalonia" was registered as a trademark by Democratic Convergence of Catalonia (CDC) in July 2016, being one of the names proposed to party members in the founding congress of the Catalan European Democratic Party (PDeCAT) and after conflicting issues with the registering of the initially chose label, "Catalan Democratic Party"; it was finally as the party was able to be registered as "Catalan European Democratic Party".

Following the declaration of Catalan independence by the Parliament of Catalonia in October 2017 and the subsequent activation of Article 155 of the Spanish Constitution, Prime Minister Mariano Rajoy dissolved the Catalan parliament and called a regional election for 21 December 2017. Catalan president Carles Puigdemont self-exiled in Belgium to avoid detention and several ministers of the Executive Council of Catalonia were put in pre-trial detention accused of sedition and rebellion. In this context, several PDeCAT leaders—Artur Mas, Marta Pascal and David Bonvehí—met with Puigdemont in Brussels after him having expressed interest in leading the party into the election, with him ultimately agreeing to run in the upcoming election on the condition that his list transcend the PDeCAT himself, instead proposing a list formed by pro-independence parties for the right of self-determination, against the use of Article 155 and in favour of "amnesty for political prisoners". It was eventually agreed that Puigdemont would run under the "Together for Catalonia" umbrella, structured as his personal list and including non-party members and figures from civil society such as ANC chairman Jordi Sànchez and future Catalan president Quim Torra. whereas the PDeCAT would provide the core of the platform and the party's organizational structure. This came after both Republican Left of Catalonia (ERC) and the Popular Unity Candidacy (CUP) rejected a new Junts pel Sí coalition. The list emerged as the largest political force within the pro-independence camp, narrowly outperforming ERC despite earlier unfavourable opinion polls, prompting Puigdemont's influence within the post-CDC space to increase, eventually leading to a rift between the PDeCAT and Puigdemont's sphere, which in July 2018 materialized into a new political platform, the National Call for the Republic (CNxR), which was then transmuted into a political party in January 2019.

Together for Catalonia would be renewed as an electoral alliance between the PDeCAT and the late CDC ahead of the April 2019 Spanish general election and the May 2019 European Parliament and local elections; running in 772 Catalan municipalities. It would count with the involvement of figures from the CNxR, who would run as independent members after the party rejected either to run on its own or explicitly give support to any candidacy in these elections. For the November 2019 general election, the formula of including CDC in the ballot as a trick to ensure public funding was not repeated, as the PDeCAT could now count on such funding itself as a result of it having contested the April election. The alliance's performance in the various elections was mixed. It was able to hold its ground and maintain previous results in the general elections, but was clearly outperformed by ERC. In the 26 May elections, ERC secured victory in the local elections whereas JxCat capitalized on Puigdemont's candidacy to the European Parliament to score a win in Catalonia.

Throughout 2019, both the PDeCAT and Puigdemont would maintain discussions over the future of the post-CDC political space and of Together for Catalonia. Following the November 2019 general election, negotiations ensued about the possible dissolution of both the CNxR and the PDeCAT into JxCat, but the latter refused to either disband its party structure or renounce to its ownership of the JxCat's trademark, and on 26 June the party's executive rejected Puigdemont's attempts to absorb the party. The next day, a manifesto was publicly launched by JxCat independents and elected members—including deputies, mayors and local councillors, and unveiled by interior regional minister Miquel Buch—in which all subscribers urged for the re-organization of the Together for Catalonia political space into a full-fledged party and the PDeCAT's dissolution into it, a proposal which was supported by members of the CNxR and Action for the Republic (AxR) as well. PDeCAT members replied with another manifesto vindicating the party's identity and legacy, showing their unwillingness to disappear as an organization and criticizing what they perceived as "one thinking" from Puigdemont's supporters.

With negotiations foundering, Puigdemont announced on 2 July 2020 that he was to break up all ties with the PDeCAT and establish a new political party by merging the CNxR, AxR and PDeCAT's splinter elements. A legal and political struggle ensued, as both the PDeCAT under David Bonheví and Puigdemont vied for the control of the "Together for Catalonia" trademark. On 10 July, Puigdemont's supporters took over the label, modifying JxCat's data in the interior ministry register by appointing aligned PDeCAT member Carles Valls Arnó as its leader, while proclaiming that the name would be used for their upcoming party. The PDeCAT dubbed this as an illegal act and announced that it would bring the issue to the courts if necessary, as the party still regarded the JxCat's trademark as theirs. As the change did not affect the electoral coalition, which legally comprised the PDeCAT and CDC, an awkward situation could develop if both "Together for Catalonia" (Puigdemont's party) and "Together for Catalonia" (the PDeCAT's coalition) chose to confront each other in any future election under such labels.

== Composition ==
Party	Notes
Catalan European Democratic Party (PDeCAT)	
Democratic Convergence of Catalonia (CDC) (Note: CDC was registered as an independent member within the alliance in order to allow its successor party, the PDeCAT, to be guaranteed CDC's public funding and electoral rights for election campaigns. This practice was discontinued ahead of the general election repetition in November 2019.)	
The Greens–Green Alternative (EV–AV)	Informally, (Note: Not directly involved; many of its members integrate the alliance's lists as independents.) left in July 2020.
Independence Rally (RI.cat)	Informally, left in July 2020.
National Call for the Republic (CNxR)	Informally since July 2018, left in July 2020.
Action for the Republic (AxR)	Formed in November 2019, left in July 2020.

== Electoral performance ==
=== Parliament of Catalonia ===
Parliament of Catalonia
Election	Votes	%	#	Seats	+/–	Leading candidate	Status in legislature
2017	948,233	21.66%	2nd	34 / 135	3 (Note: Compared to Democratic Convergence of Catalonia totals (within Junts pel Sí) in the 2015 regional election.)	Carles Puigdemont (Note: At the time of the election, Puigdemont was in self-exile in Belgium.)	Coalition (JxCat–ERC)

=== Cortes Generales ===
==== Nationwide ====
Cortes Generales
Election	Congress					Senate		Leading candidate	Status in legislature
Election	Votes	%	#	Seats	+/–	Seats	+/–	Leading candidate	Status in legislature
2019 (Apr)	500,787	1.91%	7th	7 / 350	1 (Note: Compared to Democratic Convergence of Catalonia totals in the 2016 general election.)	2 / 208	0	Jordi Sànchez (Note: At the time of the election, Sànchez was in preventive detention in Soto del Real (Madrid).)	New election
2019 (Nov)	530,225	2.19%	8th	8 / 350	1	3 / 208	1	Laura Borràs	Opposition

==== Regional breakdown ====
Election	Catalonia									
Election	Congress					Senate				
Election	Votes	%	#	Seats	+/–	Votes		%	Seats	+/–
2019 (Apr)	500,787	12.08%	4th	7 / 48	1	Candidates 1 Candidates 2 Candidates 3	672,309; 472,596; 382,883	16.62% 11.68% 9.47%	2 / 16	0
2019 (Nov)	530,225	13.68%	4th	8 / 48	1	Candidates 1 Candidates 2 Candidates 3	669,561; 550,936; 468,985	16.55% 13.62% 11.59%	3 / 16	1

=== European Parliament ===
==== Nationwide ====
European Parliament
Election	Votes	%	#	Seats	+/–	Leading candidate
2019	1,018,435	4.54%	7th	3 / 59	1	Carles Puigdemont

==== Catalonia ====
European Parliament
Election	Catalonia		
Election	Votes	%	#
2019	981,357	28.63%	1st

== Symbols ==
Main logo.

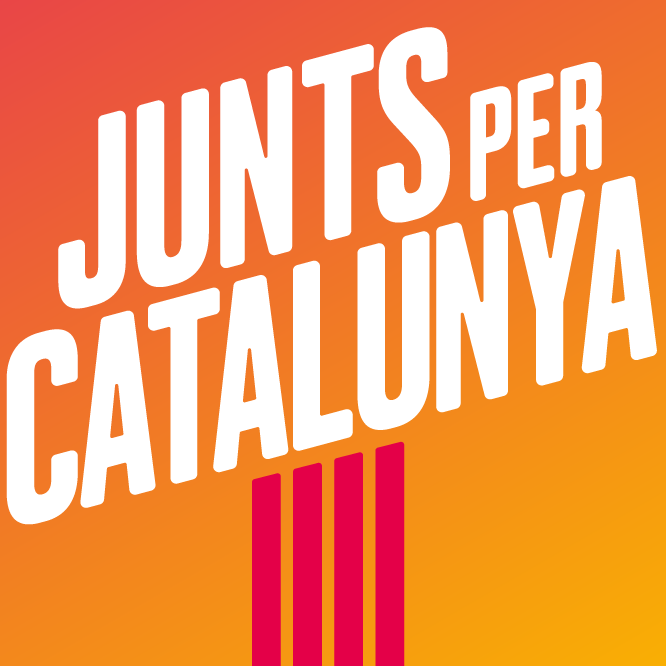
Alternative logo.

== See also ==
- Category:Together for Catalonia (2017) politicians
