= Eduard Pujol =

Spanish politician (born 1969)

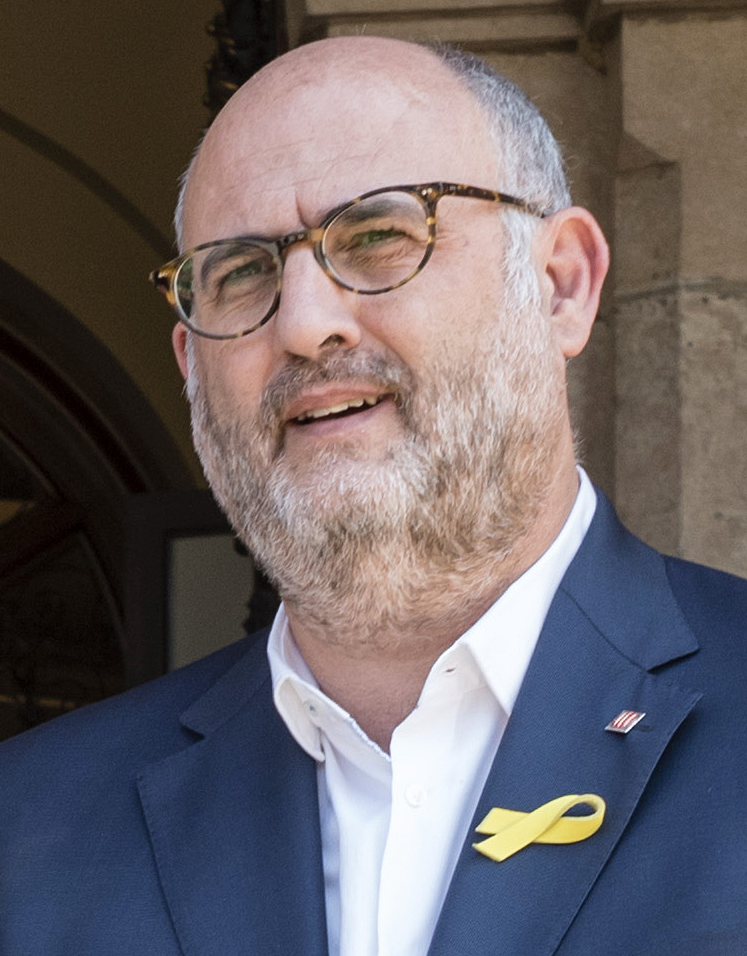
- Pujol in 2018

Member of the Senate
- Incumbent
- Assumed office 26 July 2024
- Appointed by: Parliament of Catalonia

Member of the Congress of Deputies
- In office 17 August 2023 – 25 July 2024
- Constituency: Barcelona

Personal details
- Born: 13 October 1969 (age 56)
- Party: Together for Catalonia

Eduard Pujol i Bonell (born 13 October 1969) is a Spanish politician serving as a member of the Senate since 2024. From 2023 to 2024, he was a member of the Congress of Deputies.
