= Xavier García Albiol =

Spanish politician

The Illustrious Xavier García Albiol MP
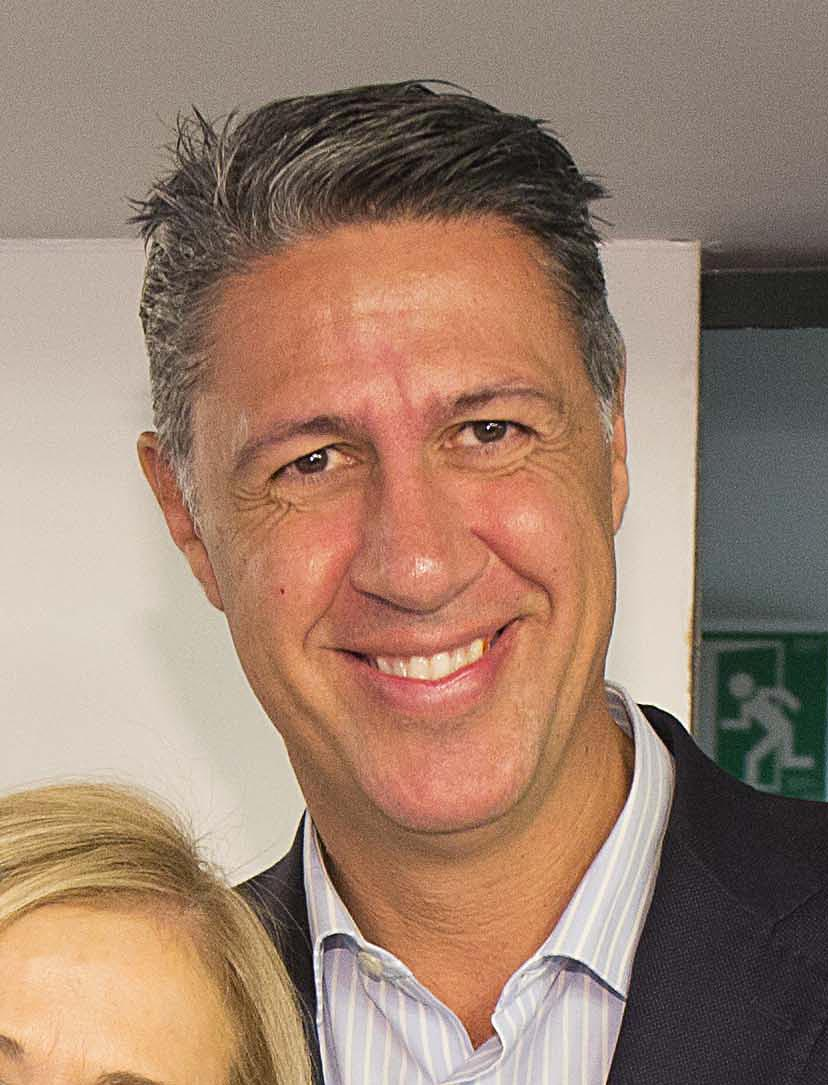

Mayor of Badalona
- Incumbent
- Assumed office 17 June 2023
- Preceded by: Rubén Guijarro
- In office 12 May 2020 – 8 November 2021
- Preceded by: Aïda Llauradó (acting)
- Succeeded by: Rubén Guijarro
- In office 11 June 2011 – 13 June 2015
- Preceded by: Jordi Serra Isern
- Succeeded by: Dolors Sabater

Spanish Senator for designation of the Parliament of Catalonia
- In office 13 January 2016 – 3 May 2018

Member of the Parliament of Catalonia
- In office 26 October 2015 – 31 January 2019
- Constituency: Barcelona

Personal details
- Born: 8 December 1967 (age 58) Badalona, Spain
- Party: People's Party of Catalonia

Xavier García Albiol (born 8 December 1967) is a Catalan politician and member of the People's Party. He has been the president of the Badalona branch of his party since 1990, and he was the mayor of Badalona between 2011 and 2015, and again from 2020 to 2021. He was reelected mayor by an absolute margin in 2023.

== Biography ==
Born as the son of an egetano (constituent of Vélez-Blanco) street sweeper driver and a Catalan hairdresser, Albiol grew up in Morera, on the outskirts of the city of Badalona, and studied at the Colegio Badalonés. Later, thanks to his height of 2.01 metres (6 ft 7 in), he played basketball with the team Joventut Badalona. He began studying law, but in 1989 abandoned his studies for a career in politics.

In 1990, he became president of the People's Party of Badalona. In 1991, Albiol was sworn into his first public office, as a councilor in Badalona.

=== Politics ===
He has been the president of the People's Party of Badalona twice: first from 1990 to 1996, and then from 2001 to the present. Between 1995 and 2000, he was the Secretary General of the People's Party. Between 2000 and 2003, he was vice-Secretary General of the People's Party of Catalonia (PPC). Between 2003 and 2005, he was Secretary of Municipal Policy of the PPC, and between 2005 and 2008 he was vice-secretary of the PPC organization. He then directed the PPC campaign during the 2008 Spanish general election.

In regards to local administrative (Spanish: supramunicipal) positions, he was deputy speaker of the People's Party in the Comarcal Council of Barcelonés between 1991 and 1995, and, later, between 1995 and 1999 he became the speaker. During this time he also served as advisor to the Mancomunidad of Municipalities of the Metropolitan Area of Barcelona. Afterwards, between 1999 and 2003, he was speaker for his party in the Provincial Deputation of Barcelona. He is currently a member of the executive committee of the PPC and president of his party in the Diputación Provincial.

=== Mayor of Badalona ===
On 6 June 2011, Albiol was elected Mayor of Badalona by simple majority.

In 2010, rival party Initiative for Catalonia Greens brought a case against Albiol before the Public Prosecutor's Office of Barcelona, charging him with violating article 510 of the Spanish Penal Code following his publication of a pamphlet they alleged to be xenophobic because it linked immigration of Romani people from Romania to increased crime. On 11 December 2013, he was acquitted of all charges by the Audiencia Provincial de Barcelona.

On 23 January 2013, Albiol, with the support of the city's supermarkets, launched a campaign titled "A Badalona no es llença el menjar" (In Badalona, we don't waste food) which sought to reduce the price of food nearing its expiration date by 50%.

Despite receiving the most votes at 35%, Albiol's list lost the 2015 Badalona municipal election. The People's Party obtained the highest number of city councilors (11, out of 27), but 15 councilors of other parties united their investiture votes to invest runner-up Dolors Sabater instead. Responding to the news, Albiol was quoted by El Mundo as saying "Esta ciudad está indignada al ver lo que se ha hecho hoy. Por primera vez, en esta ciudad hay una alcaldesa que no es de la fuerza más votada." (This city is outraged at what happened today. For the first time in the history of this city there is a mayor who received a minority of votes.)

In April 2020, Socialist mayor Àlex Pastor resigned after being arrested for assaulting a member of the Mossos d'Esquadra. Albiol became mayor for the second time, as the Socialists and left-wing separatists could not agree to a power-sharing pact.

In addition to his role in parliament, Albiol has been serving as member of the Spanish delegation to the Parliamentary Assembly of the Council of Europe since 2016. He is currently a member of the Committee on Legal Affairs and Human Rights; the Committee on the Honouring of Obligations and Commitments by Member States of the Council of Europe (Monitoring Committee); and the Committee on Migration, Refugees and Displaced Persons.

In October 2021, Albiol's name appeared on the Pandora Papers linked to an offshore venture in Belize, leading the opposition groups in the city council to announce a vote of no confidence against him, which was passed on November 8, 2021, and resulted in Rubén Guijarro of the Socialist Party of Catalonia replacing Albiol as mayor.

In the 2023 municipal elections, the Popular Party won a plurality of the vote and 18 of the 27 town councillors. García Albiol was sworn in for the third time on June 18, 2023.
