= 12th Parliament of Catalonia =

Parliament of Catalonia

←	11th	13th	→
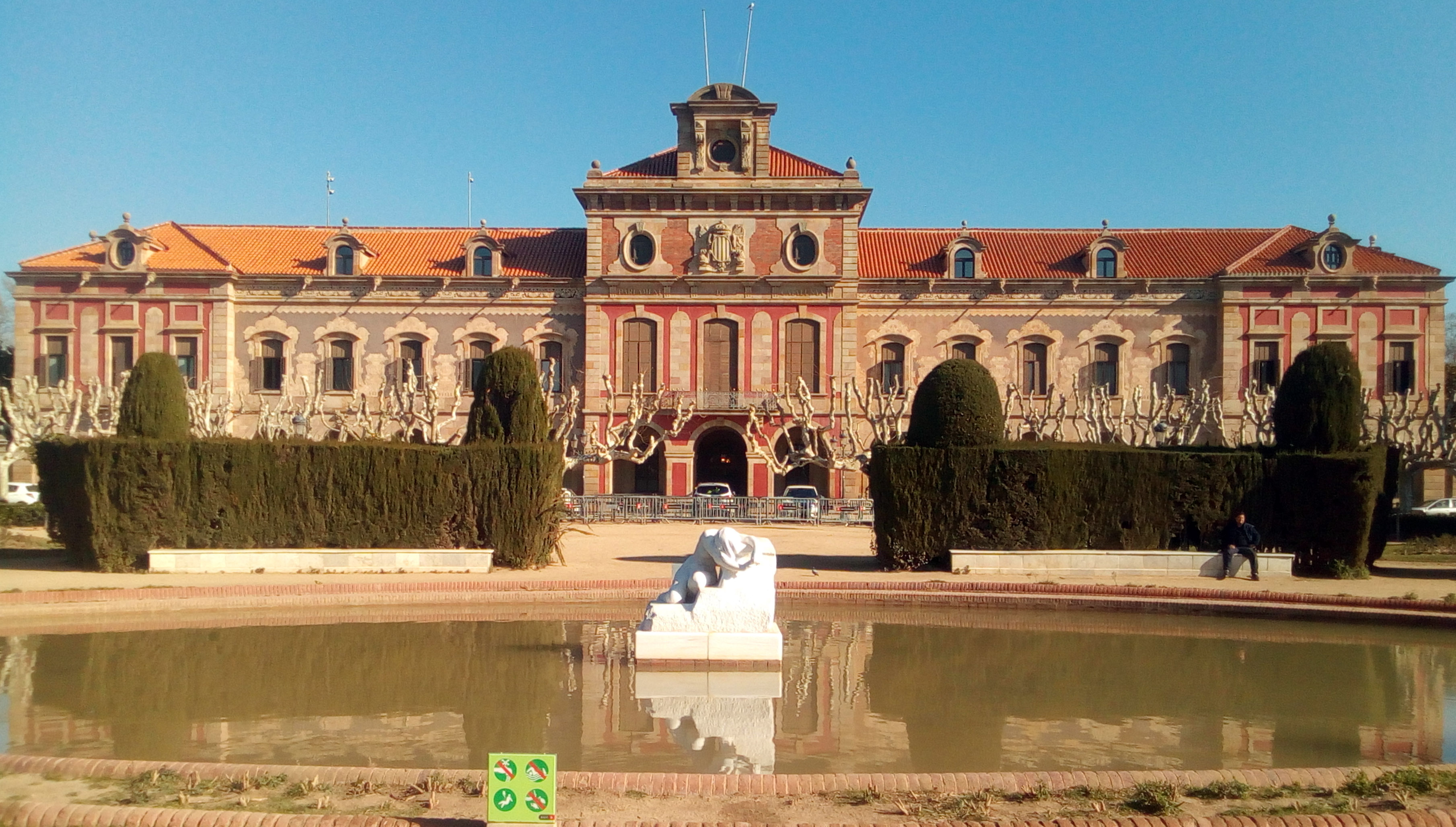

Overview
- Legislative body: Parliament of Catalonia
- Meeting place: Palau del Parlament de Catalunya
- Term: 17 January 2018 – 21 December 2020
- Election: 21 December 2017
- Government: Torra
- Website: parlament.cat

Parliamentarians
- Members: 135
- President: Roger Torrent (ERC–CatSí)
- First Vice-President: Josep Costa i Rosselló (JuntsxCat)
- Second Vice-President: José María Espejo-Saavedra (Cs)
- First Secretary: Eusebi Campdepadrós i Pucurull (JuntsxCat)
- Second Secretary: David Pérez i Ibáñez (PSC)
- Third Secretary: Joan García González (Cs)
- Fourth Secretary: Alba Vergés (ERC–CatSí) (18); Adriana Delgado i Herreros (ERC–CatSí)

The 12th Parliament of Catalonia was the meeting of the Parliament of Catalonia, with the membership determined by the results of the 2017 regional election held on 21 December 2017 after its dissolution on 27 October in application of direct rule. The parliament met for the first time on 17 January 2018.

== Election ==
The 12th Catalan parliamentary election was held on 21 December 2017. At the election Catalan secessionists retained a slim majority in the Catalan Parliament.

Alliance	Votes	%	Seats
Citizens	1,109,732	25.35%	36
Together for Catalonia	948,233	21.66%	34
Republican Left of Catalonia–Catalonia Yes	935,861	21.38%	32
Socialists' Party of Catalonia	606,659	13.86%	17
Catalunya en Comú–Podem	326,360	7.46%	8
Popular Unity Candidacy	195,246	4.46%	4
People's Party of Catalonia	185,670	4.24%	4
Others/blanks	69,038	1.58%	0
Total	4,376,799	100.00%	135

Five of the elected MPs - Toni Comín (ERC–CatSí), Clara Ponsatí (JuntsxCat), Lluís Puig (JuntsxCat), Carles Puigdemont (JuntsxCat) and Meritxell Serret (ERC–CatSí) - were in exile whilst another three - Joaquim Forn (JuntsxCat), Oriol Junqueras (ERC–CatSí) and Jordi Sànchez (JuntsxCat) - were in jail.

== History ==
The new parliament met for the first time on 17 January 2018 and elected Roger Torrent as President of the Parliament. Other members of Board of the Parliament were also elected on 17 January 2018: Josep Costa i Rosselló (First Vice-President); José María Espejo-Saavedra Conesa (Second Vice-President); Eusebi Campdepadrós i Pucurull (First Secretary); David Pérez i Ibáñez (Second Secretary); Joan García González (Third Secretary); and Alba Vergés (Fourth Secretary).

President
Candidate	Votes	
Candidate	Round 1	Round 2
Roger Torrent (ERC–CatSí)	65	65
José María Espejo-Saavedra (Cs)	56	56
Abstain	9	9
Absent	5	5

Vice-President
Candidate	Votes
Josep Costa i Rosselló (JuntsxCat)	65
José María Espejo-Saavedra (Cs)	57
Abstain	8
Absent	5

Secretary
Candidate	Votes
Eusebi Campdepadrós i Pucurull (JuntsxCat)	41
David Pérez i Ibáñez (PSC)	30
Joan García González (Cs)	27
Alba Vergés (ERC–CatSí)	24
Abstain	8
Absent	5

Alba Vergés (ERC–CatSí) resigned as Fourth Secretary on 4 June 2018 after being appointed Minister of Health. Her replacement Adriana Delgado i Herreros (ERC–CatSí) was elected on 6 June 2018.

Fourth Secretary
Candidate	Votes
Adriana Delgado i Herreros (ERC–CatSí)	63
Abstain	69
Absent	3

== Deaths, resignations and suspensions ==
The 12th parliament has seen the following deaths, resignations and suspensions:

- 9 January 2018 – Carles Mundó, the number 5 candidate on ERC–CatSí's list for Barcelona, declined to take his seat in Parliament for personal reasons. He was replaced by Gerard Gómez del Moral i Fuster (ERC–CatSí).
- 24 January 2018 – Jailed MP Joaquim Forn (JuntsxCat) resigned. He was replaced by Antoni Morral i Berenguer (JuntsxCat) on 30 January 2018.
- 29 January 2018 – Exiled MPs Clara Ponsatí (JuntsxCat), Lluís Puig (JuntsxCat) and Meritxell Serret (ERC–CatSí) resigned in order for pro-independence parties to regain a majority in Parliament after the Constitutional Court ruled that exiled MPs could not vote by proxy. Ponsatí, Puig and Serret were replaced by Saloua Laouaji Faridi (JuntsxCat), Ferran Roquer i Padrosa (JuntsxCat) and David Rodríguez i González (ERC–CatSí) respectively on 30 January 2018.
- 22 March 2018 – Dolors Bassa (ERC–CatSí), Carme Forcadell (ERC–CatSí) and Marta Rovira (ERC–CatSí) resigned prior to their appearance before the Supreme Court in relation to the Catalan independence referendum and subsequent declaration of independence. The following day the Bassa and Forcadell, along with MPs Raül Romeva (ERC–CatSí), Josep Rull (JuntsxCat) and Jordi Turull (JuntsxCat), were jailed by Supreme Court judge Pablo Llarena whilst Rovira fled to Switzerland. Bassa, Forcadell and Rovira were replaced by Magda Casamitjana i Aguilà (ERC–CatSí), Chakir El Homrani (ERC–CatSí) and Assumpció Laïlla i Jou (ERC–CatSí) respectively on 23 March 2018.
- 8 June 2018 – Maria Isabel Ferrer i Àlvarez (JuntsxCat) resigned after being appointed Director General of Civil Protection. Neus Lloveras i Massana (20), the next candidate on JuntsxCat's list for Barcelona, declined to replace Ferrer. Ferrer was replaced by Anna Erra i Solà (JuntsxCat) on 19 June 2018.
- 14 June 2018 – Chakir El Homrani (ERC–CatSí) and Alba Vergés (ERC–CatSí) resigned after being appointed Minister of Labour, Social Affairs and Family and Minister of Health respectively. They were replaced by Marc Sanglas i Alcantarilla (ERC–CatSí) and Lluïsa Llop i Fernàndez (ERC–CatSí) respectively on 19 June 2018.
- 10 July 2018 – Supreme Court judge Pablo Llarena ended his eight-month inquiry into the Catalan referendum and declaration of independence and ordered that 25 Catalan politicians and activists be tried for rebellion, embezzlement or disobedience. Amongst these were six serving MPs—Oriol Junqueras, Carles Puigdemont, Raül Romeva, Josep Rull, Jordi Sànchez and Jordi Turull—all of whom were charged with rebellion and embezzlement and suspended from holding public office by Llarena, effectively suspending them from Parliament.
- 17 May 2019 – Jordi Sànchez, Jordi Turull and Josep Rull resign their seats in order to take their seats in the Congress of Deputies elected in the April 2019 Spanish general election, with Laura Borràs following suit on 20 May. They were replaced by Miquel Buch, Elena Fort, Josep Puig y Glòria Freixa, all four next in line in the JuntsxCat list for Barcelona.

== Members ==
Name	Constituency	No.	Party	Alliance	Took office	Left office	Notes
Concepción Abellán Carretero	Barcelona	10	Podemos	CatECP	16 April 2019	21 December 2020	Replaces Elisenda Alamany Gutiérrez.
Elisenda Alamany Gutiérrez	Barcelona	2	CatComú	CatECP	17 January 2018	2 April 2019	Left group on 25 February 2019 to join Sobiranistes. Resigned. Replaced by Concepción Abellán Carretero.
Jéssica Albiach Satorres	Barcelona	3	Podemos	CatECP	17 January 2018	21 December 2020	
Jordi Albert i Caballero	Barcelona	17	ERC	ERC–CatSí	17 January 2018	21 December 2020	
Matías Alonso	Tarragona	1	Cs		17 January 2018	21 December 2020	
Héctor Amellò Montiu	Girona	3	Cs		17 January 2018	21 December 2020	
Vidal Aragonés Chicharro	Barcelona	3	AEC	CUP–CC	17 January 2018	21 December 2020	
Inés Arrimadas	Barcelona	1	Cs		17 January 2018	20 May 2019	Leader of the Opposition 2015–2019. Resigned. Replaced by Jorge Feijóo Suñol.
Elsa Artadi	Barcelona	10	Junts	JuntsxCat	17 January 2018	21 December 2020	Minister of the Presidency, Government Spokesperson 2018–2019. Aligned to CNxR. Independent until July 2020, then Junts.
Eva Baró i Ramos	Barcelona	12	ERC	ERC–CatSí	17 January 2018	16 July 2019	Resigned. Replaced by Aurora Carbonell i Abella.
Martín Eusebio Barra López	Barcelona	15	Cs		17 January 2018	21 December 2020	
Dolors Bassa	Girona	1	ERC	ERC–CatSí	17 January 2018	22 March 2018	Resigned. Replaced by Magda Casamitjana i Aguilà.
Albert Batet i Canadell	Tarragona	3	Junts	JuntsxCat	17 January 2018	21 December 2020	Left the PDeCAT in August 2020.
Susana Beltrán García	Barcelona	12	Cs		17 January 2018	21 December 2020	
Najat Driouech Ben Moussa	Barcelona	10	Indep.	ERC–CatSí	17 January 2018	21 December 2020	
David Bertran Román	Lleida	3	Cs		17 January 2018	21 December 2020	
Laura Borràs	Barcelona	5	Indep.	JuntsxCat	17 January 2018	20 May 2019	Minister of Culture. Aligned to CNxR. Resigned. Replaced by Glòria Freixa i Vilardell.
Marina Bravo Sobrino	Barcelona	8	Cs		17 January 2018	21 December 2020	
Rafel Bruguera i Batalla	Girona	1	PSC	PSC	17 January 2018	21 December 2020	
Miquel Buch	Barcelona	22	Junts	JuntsxCat	28 May 2019	21 December 2020	Minister of the Interior. Replaces Jordi Sànchez. Left the PDeCAT in August 2020.
Eusebi Campdepadrós i Pucurull	Tarragona	1	IdE	JuntsxCat	17 January 2018	21 December 2020	First Secretary. Aligned to CNxR. Independent until July 2020, then Junts.
José María Cano Navarro	Barcelona	17	Cs		17 January 2018	21 December 2020	
Aurora Carbonell i Abella	Barcelona	28	ERC	ERC–CatSí	25 July 2019		Replaces Eva Baró i Ramos.
Carlos Carrizosa	Barcelona	2	Cs		17 January 2018	21 December 2020	Leader of the Opposition 2019.
Magda Casamitjana i Aguilà	Girona	5	MES	ERC–CatSí	23 March 2018	30 November 2018	Replaces Dolors Bassa. Resigned. Replaced by Jordi Orobitg i Solé.
Jean Castel Sucarrat	Girona	1	Cs		17 January 2018	21 December 2020	
Antoni Castellà i Clavé	Barcelona	15	DC	ERC–CatSí	17 January 2018	21 December 2020	
Carles Castillo	Tarragona	2	PSC	PSC	17 January 2018	21 December 2020	
Anna Caula i Paretas	Girona	3	Indep.	ERC–CatSí	17 January 2018	21 December 2020	
David Cid Colomer	Barcelona	7	CatComú	CatECP	17 January 2018	21 December 2020	
Ferran Civit i Martí	Tarragona	5	ERC	ERC–CatSí	17 January 2018	21 December 2020	
Narcís Clara i Lloret	Girona	4	PDeCAT	JuntsxCat	17 January 2018	21 December 2020	
Toni Comín	Barcelona	7	ERC	ERC–CatSí	17 January 2018	7 January 2020	Suspended on 10 July 2018. Resigned. Replaced by Alba Metge i Climent.
Josep Costa i Rosselló	Barcelona	17	Junts	JuntsxCat	17 January 2018	21 December 2020	First Vice-President. Aligned to CNxR. Independent until July 2020, then Junts.
Francesc de Dalmases i Thió	Barcelona	16	Junts	JuntsxCat	17 January 2018	21 December 2020	Aligned to CNxR. Independent until July 2020, then Junts.
Manuel Rodríguez de l'Hotellerie de Fallois	Barcelona	24	Cs		17 January 2018	21 December 2020	
Noemí de la Calle Sifré	Barcelona	10	Cs		17 January 2018	21 December 2020	
Mònica Sales de la Cruz	Tarragona	4	Junts	JuntsxCat	17 January 2018	21 December 2020	Left the PDeCAT in August 2020.
Maria del Camino Fernández Riol	Girona	4	Cs		17 January 2018	21 December 2020	
Adriana Delgado i Herreros	Barcelona	16	ERC	ERC–CatSí	17 January 2018	21 December 2020	Fourth Secretary (18).
Fernando Tomás de Páramo Gómez	Barcelona	4	Cs		17 January 2018	31 July 2018	Resigned. Replaced by Martí Pachamé Barrera.
Carmen de Rivera Pla	Barcelona	19	Cs		17 January 2018	21 December 2020	
Jenn Díaz Ruiz	Barcelona	8	Indep.	ERC–CatSí	17 January 2018	21 December 2020	
Xavier Domènech	Barcelona	1	CatComú	CatECP	17 January 2018	12 September 2018	Resigned. Replaced by Lucas Silvano Ferro Solé.
Francisco Javier Domínguez Serrano	Tarragona	4	Cs		17 January 2018	21 December 2020	
Anna Erra i Solà	Barcelona	21	Junts	JuntsxCat	19 June 2018	21 December 2020	Replaces Maria Isabel Ferrer i Àlvarez. Left the PDeCAT in August 2020.
Assumpta Escarp Gibert	Barcelona	8	PSC	PSC	17 January 2018	21 December 2020	
Mercè Escofet Sala	Barcelona	27	Cs		28 May 2019	21 December 2020	Replaces José María Espejo-Saavedra.
Ramon Espadaler	Barcelona	3	Els Units	PSC	17 January 2018	21 December 2020	
José María Espejo-Saavedra	Barcelona	3	Cs		17 January 2018	20 May 2019	Second Vice-President 2018–2019. Resigned. Replaced by Mercè Escofet Sala.
Antonio Espinosa Cerrato	Barcelona	11	Cs		17 January 2018	21 December 2020	
Gemma Espigares i Tribó	Lleida	3	ERC	ERC–CatSí	17 January 2018	21 December 2020	
Jorge Feijóo Suñol	Barcelona	26	Cs		28 May 2019	21 December 2020	Replaces Inés Arrimadas.
Alejandro Fernández Álvarez	Tarragona	1	PP		17 January 2018	21 December 2020	
Maialen Fernández Cabezas	Tarragona	5	Cs		17 January 2018	21 December 2020	
Munia Ferández-Jordán Celorio	Barcelona	22	Cs		17 January 2018	21 December 2020	
Maria Isabel Ferrer i Àlvarez	Barcelona	15	Indep.	JuntsxCat	17 January 2018	8 June 2018	Resigned. Replaced by Anna Erra i Solà.
Lucas Silvano Ferro Solé	Barcelona	8	Podemos	CatECP	26 September 2018	21 December 2020	Replaced Xavier Domènech.
Lluís Font i Espinós	Barcelona	12	PDeCAT	JuntsxCat	17 January 2018	21 December 2020	
Carme Forcadell	Barcelona	4	ERC	ERC–CatSí	17 January 2018	22 March 2018	Resigned. Replaced by Chakir El Homrani.
Joaquim Forn	Barcelona	7	PDeCAT	JuntsxCat	17 January 2018	24 January 2018	Resigned. Replaced by Antoni Morral i Berenguer.
Josep Maria Forné i Febrer	Lleida	1	Junts	JuntsxCat	17 January 2018	21 December 2020	Aligned to CNxR. Independent until July 2020, then Junts.
Montserrat Fornells i Solé	Lleida	5	ERC	ERC–CatSí	17 January 2018	21 December 2020	
Irene Fornós i Curto	Tarragona	4	ERC	ERC–CatSí	17 January 2018	21 December 2020	
Maria Elena Fort i Cisneros	Barcelona	23	Junts	JuntsxCat	25 May 2019	21 December 2020	Replaces Jordi Turull. Aligned to CNxR. Independent until July 2020, then Junts.
Glòria Freixa i Vilardell	Barcelona	25	Junts	JuntsxCat	28 May 2019	21 December 2020	Replaces Laura Borràs. Aligned to CNxR. Independent until July 2020, then Junts.
Imma Gallardo Barceló	Lleida	3	Junts	JuntsxCat	17 January 2018	21 December 2020	Left the PDeCAT in August 2020.
Joan García González	Barcelona	7	Cs		17 January 2018	21 December 2020	Third Secretary 2018–2019. Second Vice-President since 2019.
Xavier García Albiol	Barcelona	1	PP		17 January 2018	31 January 2019	Resigned. Replaced by Esperanza García González.
Esperanza García González	Barcelona	4	PP		6 February 2019	21 December 2020	Replaces Xavier García Albiol.
Gemma Geis i Carreras	Girona	1	Junts	JuntsxCat	17 January 2018	21 December 2020	Aligned to CNxR. Independent until July 2020, then Junts.
Anna Geli España	Lleida	6	Junts	JuntsxCat	17 January 2018		Aligned to CNxR. Independent until July 2020, then Junts.
Pol Gibert Horcas	Barcelona	11	PSC	PSC	17 January 2018	21 December 2020	
Gerard Gómez	Barcelona	19	ERC	ERC–CatSí	17 January 2018	20 May 2019	Replaces Carles Mundó. Resigned. Replaced by José Rodríguez Fernández.
Dimas Gragera Velaz	Barcelona	23	Cs		17 January 2018	21 December 2020	
Eva Granados	Barcelona	2	PSC	PSC	17 January 2018	21 December 2020	
María Luz Guilarte Sánchez	Barcelona	14	Cs		17 January 2018	1 July 2019	Resigned. Replaced by Manuel Losada Seivane.
Lluís Guinó i Subirós	Girona	5	Junts	JuntsxCat	17 January 2018	21 December 2020	Left the PDeCAT in August 2020.
Chakir El Homrani	Barcelona	21	ERC	ERC–CatSí	23 March 2018	14 June 2018	Replaces Carme Forcadell. Resigned. Replaced by Marc Sanglas i Alcantarilla.
Rosa Maria Ibarra	Tarragona	1	PSC	PSC	17 January 2018	21 December 2020	
Miquel Iceta	Barcelona	1	PSC	PSC	17 January 2018	21 December 2020	
Josep Maria Jové i Lladó	Barcelona	11	ERC	ERC–CatSí	17 January 2018	21 December 2020	
Oriol Junqueras	Barcelona	1	ERC	ERC–CatSí	17 January 2018	20 May 2019	Suspended on 10 July 2018. Resigned. Replaced by Núria Picas i Albets.
Assumpció Laïlla i Jou	Barcelona	20	DC	ERC–CatSí	23 March 2018	21 December 2020	Replaces Marta Rovira.
Saloua Laouaji Faridi	Barcelona	19	AxR	JuntsxCat	30 January 2018		Replaces Clara Ponsatí. Aligned to CNxR.
Andrea Levy Soler	Barcelona	2	PP		17 January 2018	9 May 2019	Resigned. Replaced by Daniel Serrano.
Daniel Serrano Coronado	Barcelona	5	PP		15 May 2019	21 December 2020	Replaces Andrea Levy Soler.
Noemí Llauradó i Sans	Tarragona	2	ERC	ERC–CatSí	17 January 2018	3 July 2019	Resigned. Replaced by Alfons Montserrat i Esteller.
Lluïsa Llop i Fernàndez	Barcelona	23	ERC	ERC–CatSí	19 June 2018	21 December 2020	Replaces Alba Vergés.
Yolanda López Fernández	Tarragona	1	Podemos	CatECP	17 January 2018	21 December 2020	
Manuel Losada Seivane	Barcelona	28	Cs		18 July 2019	21 December 2020	Replaces María Luz Guilarte Sánchez.
Montserrat Macià Gou	Lleida	5	PDeCAT	JuntsxCat	17 January 2018	21 December 2020	
Aurora Madaula i Giménez	Barcelona	9	AxR	JuntsxCat	17 January 2018	21 December 2020	Aligned to CNxR.
Marta Madrenas	Girona	3	Junts	JuntsxCat	17 January 2018		Left the PDeCAT in August 2020.
Ernest Maragall	Barcelona	13	MES	ERC–CatSí	17 January 2018	21 December 2020	Minister of Foreign Action, Institutional Relations and Transparency.
Ignacio Martín Blanco	Barcelona	6	Cs		17 January 2018	21 December 2020	
Ferran Mascarell i Canalda	Barcelona	26	AxR	JuntsxCat	4 February 2020	21 December 2020	Replaces Carles Puigdemont. Aligned to CNxR.
David Mejía Ayra	Barcelona	9	Cs		17 January 2018	21 December 2020	
Alba Metge i Climent	Barcelona	33	ERC	ERC–CatSí	22 January 2020	21 December 2020	Replaces Toni Comín.
Alfons Montserrat i Esteller	Tarragona	7	ERC	ERC–CatSí	18 July 2019	21 December 2020	Replaces Noemí Llauradó i Sans.
Raúl Moreno Montaña	Barcelona	13	PSC	PSC	17 January 2018	21 December 2020	
Marta Moreta i Rovira	Barcelona	12	PSC	PSC	17 January 2018	21 December 2020	
Antoni Morral i Berenguer	Barcelona	18	Junts	JuntsxCat	30 January 2018	21 December 2020	Replaces Joaquim Forn. Aligned to CNxR. Independent until July 2020, then Junts.
Jordi Munell i Garcia	Girona	6	Junts	JuntsxCat	17 January 2018	21 December 2020	Left the PDeCAT in August 2020.
Blanca Victoria Navarro Pacheco	Barcelona	16	Cs		17 January 2018	21 December 2020	
Esther Niubó Cindoncha	Barcelona	10	PSC	PSC	17 January 2018	21 December 2020	
Joan Josep Nuet i Pujals	Barcelona	5	CatComú	CatECP	17 January 2018	20 March 2019	Resigned to join Sobiranistes. Replaced by Marc Parés Franzi.
Òscar Ordeig Molist	Lleida	1	PSC	PSC	17 January 2018	21 December 2020	
Jordi Orobitg i Solé	Girona	6	ERC	ERC–CatSí	11 December 2018	21 December 2020	Replaces Magda Casamitjana i Aguilà.
Martí Pachamé Barrera	Barcelona	25	Cs		4 September 2018	21 December 2020	Replaces Fernando Tomás de Páramo Gómez.
Mònica Palacín i París	Barcelona	18	ERC	ERC–CatSí	17 January 2018	21 December 2020	
Teresa Pallarès Piqué	Tarragona	2	Junts	JuntsxCat	17 January 2018	21 December 2020	Aligned to CNxR. Independent until July 2020, then Junts.
Marc Parés Franzi	Barcelona	9	CatComú	CatECP	2 April 2019	21 December 2020	Replaces Joan Josep Nuet i Pujals.
Ferran Pedret i Santos	Barcelona	5	PSC	PSC	17 January 2018	21 December 2020	
David Pérez i Ibáñez	Barcelona	9	PSC	PSC	17 January 2018	21 December 2020	Second Secretary.
Òscar Peris i Ròdenas	Tarragona	1	ERC	ERC–CatSí	17 January 2018	24 July 2018	Resigned. Replaced by Raquel Sans i Guerra.
Núria Picas i Albets	Barcelona	25	ERC	ERC–CatSí	28 May 2019	21 December 2020	Replaces Oriol Junqueras.
Clara Ponsatí	Barcelona	3	Indep.	JuntsxCat	17 January 2018	29 January 2018	Resigned. Replaced by Saloua Laouaji Faridi.
Lluís Puig	Girona	2	PDeCAT	JuntsxCat	17 January 2018	29 January 2018	Resigned. Replaced by Ferran Roquer i Padrosa.
Josep Puig i Boix	Barcelona	24	EV–AV	JuntsxCat	28 May 2019	21 December 2020	Replaces Josep Rull. Aligned to CNxR.
Carles Puigdemont	Barcelona	1	PDeCAT	JuntsxCat	17 January 2018	7 January 2020	Suspended on 10 July 2018. Aligned to CNxR. Resigned. Replaced by Ferran Mascarell i Canalda.
Eduard Pujol i Bonell	Barcelona	8	Junts	JuntsxCat	17 January 2018	21 December 2020	Aligned to CNxR. Independent until July 2020, then Junts.
Xavier Quinquillà Durich	Lleida	4	Junts	JuntsxCat	17 January 2018	21 December 2020	Aligned to CNxR. Independent until July 2020, then Junts.
Eduardo Reyes Pino	Barcelona	31	ERC	ERC–CatSí	26 November 2019	21 December 2020	Replaces Raül Romeva.
Marta Ribas Frías	Barcelona	4	CatComú	CatECP	17 January 2018	21 December 2020	
Rut Ribas i Martí	Barcelona	14	ERC	ERC–CatSí	17 January 2018	21 December 2020	
Carles Riera	Barcelona	1	Endavant	CUP–CC	17 January 2018	21 December 2020	
Josep Riera i Font	Barcelona	13	Junts	JuntsxCat	17 January 2018	21 December 2020	Aligned to CNxR. Independent until July 2020, then Junts.
Javier Rivas Escamilla	Lleida	2	Cs		17 January 2018	21 December 2020	
José Rodríguez Fernández	Barcelona	26	ERC	ERC–CatSí	28 May 2019	21 December 2020	Resigned. Replaces Gerard Gómez.
David Rodríguez i González	Lleida	6	ERC	ERC–CatSí	30 January 2018	20 September 2018	Replaces Meritxell Serret. Resigned. Replaced by Marta Vilalta i Torres.
Santiago Rodríguez Serra	Barcelona	3	PP		17 January 2018	21 December 2020	
Lorena Roldán Suárez	Tarragona	2	Cs		17 January 2018	21 December 2020	Leader of the Opposition since 2019.
Alícia Romero Llano	Barcelona	6	PSC	PSC	17 January 2018	21 December 2020	
Raül Romeva	Barcelona	3	Indep.	ERC–CatSí	17 January 2018	29 October 2019	Suspended on 10 July 2018. Stripped of his status as deputy. Replaced by Eduardo Reyes Pino.
Ferran Roquer i Padrosa	Girona	8	Junts	JuntsxCat	30 January 2018	21 December 2020	Replaces Lluís Puig. Left the PDeCAT in August 2020.
Marta Rovira	Barcelona	2	ERC	ERC–CatSí	17 January 2018	22 March 2018	Resigned. Replaced by Assumpció Laïlla i Jou.
Josep Rull	Barcelona	6	PDeCAT	JuntsxCat	17 January 2018	17 May 2019	Suspended on 10 July 2018. Aligned to CNxR. Resigned. Replaced by Josep Puig i Boix.
Sergi Sabrià i Benito	Girona	4	ERC	ERC–CatSí	17 January 2018	21 December 2020	
Josep Lluís Salvadó i Tenesa	Tarragona	3	ERC	ERC–CatSí	17 January 2018	21 December 2020	
Natàlia Sànchez Dipp	Girona	1	CUP	CUP–CC	17 January 2018	21 December 2020	
Alfonso Sánchez Fisac	Girona	2	Cs		17 January 2018	21 December 2020	
Carlos Sánchez Martín	Tarragona	3	Cs		17 January 2018	21 December 2020	
Jordi Sànchez	Barcelona	2	Indep.	JuntsxCat	17 January 2018	17 May 2019	Suspended on 10 July 2018. Aligned to CNxR. Resigned. Replaced by Miquel Buch.
Marc Sanglas i Alcantarilla	Barcelona	22	ERC	ERC–CatSí	19 June 2018	21 December 2020	Replaces Chakir El Homrani.
Raquel Sans i Guerra	Tarragona	6	ERC	ERC–CatSí	31 July 2018	21 December 2020	Replaces Òscar Peris i Ròdenas.
Sergio Sanz Jiménez	Barcelona	18	Cs		17 January 2018	21 December 2020	
Susana Segovia Sánchez	Barcelona	6	BComú	CatECP	17 January 2018		
Meritxell Serret	Lleida	1	ERC	ERC–CatSí	17 January 2018	29 January 2018	Resigned. Replaced by David Rodríguez i González.
Sonia Sierra Infante	Barcelona	5	Cs		17 January 2018	21 December 2020	
Beatriz Silva Gallardo	Barcelona	4	Indep.	PSC	17 January 2018	21 December 2020	
Maria Sirvent Escrig	Barcelona	2	CUP	CUP–CC	17 January 2018	21 December 2020	
Bernat Solé i Barril	Lleida	2	ERC	ERC–CatSí	17 January 2018	21 December 2020	
Jorge Soler González	Lleida	1	Cs		17 January 2018	21 December 2020	
Marc Solsona i Aixalà	Lleida	2	PDeCAT	JuntsxCat	17 January 2018	21 December 2020	
Anna Tarrés i Campa	Barcelona	14	Junts	JuntsxCat	17 January 2018	21 December 2020	Aligned to CNxR. Independent until July 2020, then Junts.
Francesc Xavier Ten i Costa	Girona	7	Junts	JuntsxCat	17 January 2018	21 December 2020	Left the PDeCAT in August 2020.
Jordi Terrades i Santacreu	Barcelona	7	PSC	PSC	17 January 2018	21 December 2020	
Quim Torra	Barcelona	11	Indep.	JuntsxCat	17 January 2018	27 January 2020	President of the Government of Catalonia. Aligned to CNxR. Stripped of his status as deputy.
Roger Torrent	Girona	2	ERC	ERC–CatSí	17 January 2018	21 December 2020	President of the Parliament.
Jordi Turull	Barcelona	4	PDeCAT	JuntsxCat	17 January 2018	17 May 2019	Suspended on 10 July 2018. Aligned to CNxR. Resigned. Replaced by Maria Elena Fort i Cisneros.
Elisabeth Valencia Mimbrero	Barcelona	20	Cs		17 January 2018	21 December 2020	
María Francisca Valle Fuentes	Barcelona	21	Cs		17 January 2018	21 December 2020	
Alba Vergés	Barcelona	6	ERC	ERC–CatSí	17 January 2018	14 June 2018	Fourth Secretary (18). Resigned. Replaced by Lluïsa Llop i Fernàndez.
Francesc Viaplana i Manresa	Lleida	4	Indep.	ERC–CatSí	17 January 2018	21 December 2020	
Marta Vilalta i Torres	Lleida	7	ERC	ERC–CatSí	2 October 2018	21 December 2020	Replaces David Rodríguez i González.
Laura Vílchez Sánchez	Barcelona	13	Cs		17 January 2018	21 December 2020	Third Secretary since 2019.
Ruben Wagensberg	Barcelona	9	Indep.	ERC–CatSí	17 January 2018	21 December 2020	
