= Chakir El Homrani =

Spanish politician

The Honourable Chakir El Homrani
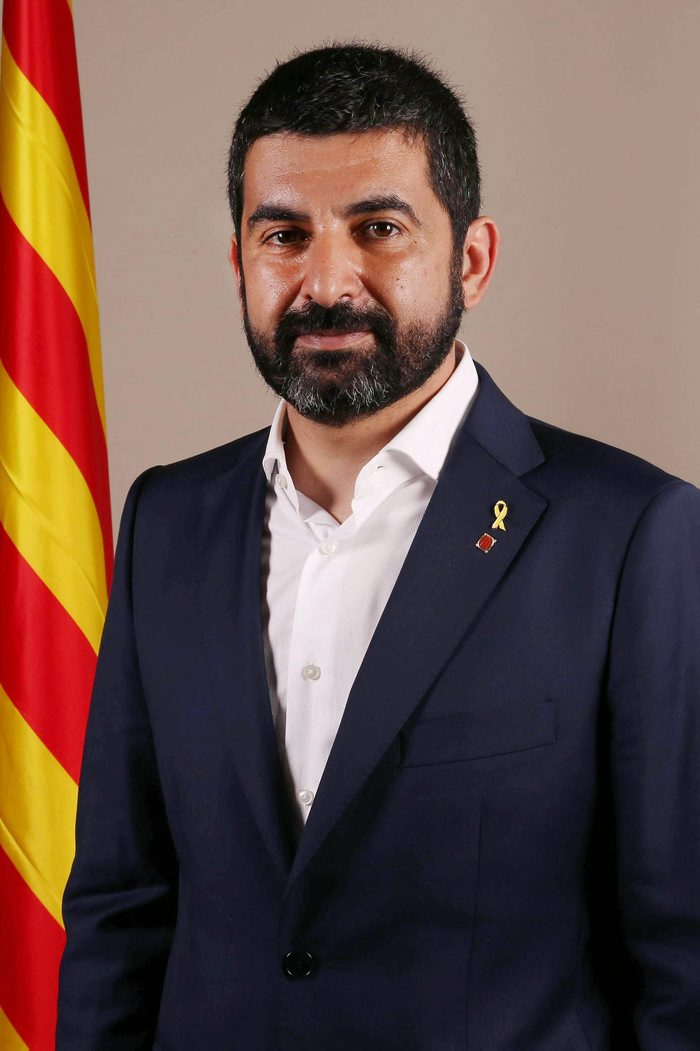
- Homrani in June 2018

Minister of Labour, Social Affairs and Family
- In office 2 June 2018 – 26 May 2021
- President: Quim Torra
- Preceded by: Dolors Bassa (Direct rule from 27 October 2017)
- Succeeded by: Violant Cervera

Member of the Catalan Parliament for the Province of Barcelona
- In office 12 March 2021 – 16 January 2023
- In office 26 October 2015 – 14 June 2018

Member of the Municipality Council of Granollers
- In office 2015–2018

Personal details
- Born: Chakir El Homrani Lesfar; 1979 (age 46–47) Barcelona, Catalonia, Spain
- Party: Republican Left of Catalonia
- Other political affiliations: Republican Left of Catalonia–Catalonia Yes
- Education: Autonomous University of Barcelona

Chakir El Homrani Lesfar (born 1979) is a Spanish-Moroccan trade unionist, politician Minister of Labour, Social Affairs and Family of Catalonia between 2018 and 2021.

Born in 1979 in Barcelona, Homrani studied sociology at the Autonomous University of Barcelona. Active in the trade union youth movement, he joined the nationalist Republican Left of Catalonia in 2004. He was elected to the municipality council in Granollers and the Parliament of Catalonia in 2015 and was appointed Minister of Labour, Social Affairs and Family in June 2018.

== Early life and family ==
Homrani was born in 1979 in Barcelona, Catalonia to Moroccan parents. He grew up in the Les Planes neighbourhood of Baixador de Vallvidrera in Barcelona and became a Spanish citizen in November 1997. He has degree in sociology from the Autonomous University of Barcelona (UAB).

Homrani was secretary and national spokesperson of Avalot-Joves, the youth wing of the Unión General de Trabajadores (UGT). He was a member of the UGT's national committee and the national council. He joined the Republican Left of Catalonia (ERC) in 2004.

== Career ==
Homrani worked in vocational training field and the water and environment sector and had worked as a product manager for Aqua Development Network. He has co-ordinated youth social and labour mediation projects (Eixam) and organised employment workshops.

Homrani has been a trainer at the University of Barcelona's Institute of Educational Sciences of the UB and worked with the university's social platform project on cities and social cohesion. He has also participated in the leadership program organised by the UAB's Institut de Govern i Polítiques Públiques and the Jaume Bofill Foundation.

Homrani is a member of the Esplai Guai de Palou, Club Natació Granollers and the Fundació Josep Comaposada Sindicalistes Solidaris, with which he collaborated in co-operation projects in Morocco and Central America. He is also a member of the Consell de Cooperació de Granollers, the Consell de la Joventut de Barcelona (CJB) and the Consell Nacional de la Joventut de Catalunya (CNJC).

Homrani contested the 2015 local elections as a Republican Left of Catalonia-Accio Granollers (ERC-AG-A) electoral alliance candidate in Granollers and was elected.

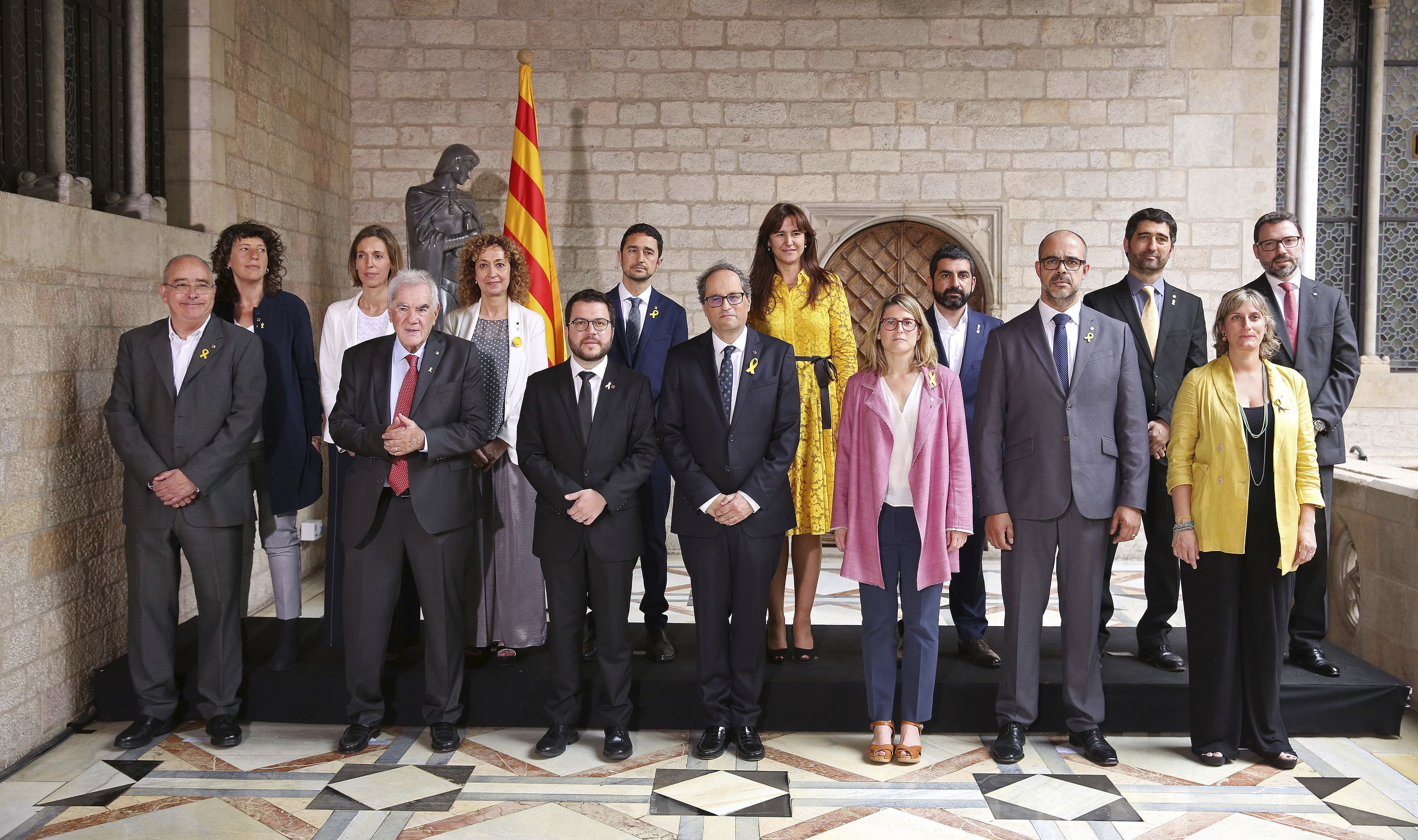
Homrani and other members of the Catalan government on 2 June 2018

Homrani contested the 2015 regional election as a Junts pel Sí (JxSí) electoral alliance candidate in the Province of Barcelona and was elected to the Parliament of Catalonia. At the 2017 regional election Homrani was placed 21st on the Republican Left of Catalonia–Catalonia Yes alliance's list of candidates in Barcelona but the alliance only managed to win 18 seats in the province and as a result he failed to get re-elected. However, in March 2018, he, together with Magdalena Casamitjana i Aguilà and Assumpció Laïlla i Jou, were appointed to the Catalan Parliament following the resignation of Dolors Bassa, Carme Forcadell and Marta Rovira.

On 19 May 2018 newly elected President Quim Torra nominated a new government in which Homrani was to be Minister of Labour, Social Affairs and Family. He was sworn in on 2 June 2018 at the Palau de la Generalitat de Catalunya.

== Personal life ==
Homrani has a son and daughter.

== Electoral history ==
Electoral history of Chakir El Homrani
Election	Constituency	Party	Alliance	No.	Result
2015 local	Granollers	Republican Left of Catalonia	Republican Left of Catalonia-Accio Granollers	3	Elected
2015 regional	Province of Barcelona	Republican Left of Catalonia	Junts pel Sí	15	Elected
2017 regional	Province of Barcelona	Republican Left of Catalonia	Republican Left of Catalonia–Catalonia Yes	21	Not elected
