= Jorge Soler (disambiguation) =

Jorge Soler may refer to:

- Jorge Soler (born 1992), Cuban baseball player
- Jorge Soler (gymnast), Argentine gymnast
- Jorge Soler González (born 1975), Spanish politician
