= Bernat Solé =

Spanish politician

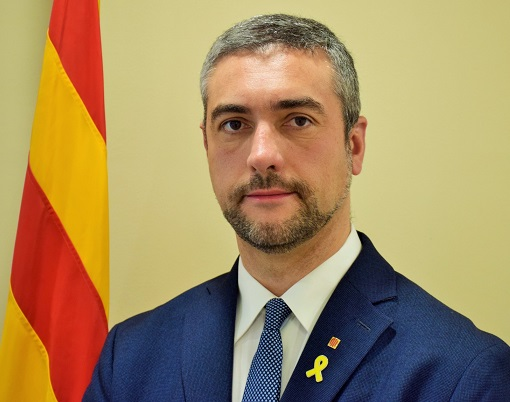
- Solé in March 2020

Minister for External and Institutional Relations and Transparency of Catalonia
- In office 21 March 2020 – 26 May 2021
- President: Quim Torra
- Preceded by: Alfred Bosch
- Succeeded by: Victòria Alsina

Member of the Parliament of Catalonia
- Incumbent
- Assumed office 26 October 2015
- Constituency: Lleida

Mayor of Agramunt
- In office 2011–2020
- Preceded by: Amadeu Padullés i Serra

Member of Agramunt Municipal Council
- In office 2007–2020

Personal details
- Born: Bernat Solé i Barril; 30 January 1975 (age 51) Agramunt, Catalonia, Spain
- Citizenship: Spanish
- Party: Republican Left of Catalonia
- Other political affiliations: Republican Left of Catalonia–Catalonia Yes
- Education: Polytechnic University of Catalonia
- Occupation: Industrial engineer

Bernat Solé i Barril (born 30 January 1975) is a Spanish industrial engineer and politician from Catalonia, member of the Parliament of Catalonia and Minister of Foreign Action, Institutional Relations and Transparency of Catalonia between 2020 and 2021. He was previously mayor of Agramunt. He is currently awaiting trial on charges of disobedience for his role in the Catalan declaration of independence.

== Early life ==
Solé was born on 30 January 1975 in Agramunt, Catalonia. He has a degree in industrial engineering from the Polytechnic University of Catalonia.

== Career ==
Solé is an industrial engineer by profession. He has worked as an engineer in the private sector and has taught technology in schools.

Solé has been a member of Republican Left of Catalonia (ERC) since 2006. He was communication secretary for ERC's Urgell county branch from 2006 to 2008. He has been a member of ERC's national executive since 2015. At the 2006 regional election he was placed 12th on ERC's list of candidates in the Province of Lleida but the party only won three seats in the province and as a result he failed to get elected.

Solé contested the 2007 local elections as a Republican Left of Catalonia-Acord Municipal (ERC-AM) electoral alliance candidate in Agramunt and was elected. He was re-elected at the 2011 local elections and became mayor of Agramunt. He was re-elected at the 2015 and 2019 local elections.

Solé contested the 2015 regional election as a Junts pel Sí (JxSí) electoral alliance candidate in the province of Lleida and was elected to the Parliament of Catalonia. He was re-elected at the 2017 regional election. He became deputy spokesperson for the Republican group in Parliament in May 2019 following Gerard Gómez's election to the Congress of Deputies.

In May 2019 the High Court of Justice of Catalonia (TSJC) summoned Solé to appear before the court on 4 June 2019 to be interrogated about charges of disobedience in relation to his role in the conduct of the 2017 Catalan independence referendum. At the interrogation Solé rejected the charges of disobedience, stating that as mayor he did not promote the referendum and that he was merely expressing his political opinions. In October 2019 TSJC judge Mercedes Armas found evidence of Solé committing disobedience, closed the investigation against him and requested that an oral trial begins. The TSJC dismissed an appeal by Solé in January 2020 and ordered that he be tried for disobedience for facilitating the referendum in Agramunt, allowing the use of public premises and hiding ballot boxes. Solé could be disqualified from holding public office for one and a half years and fined €24,000 if found guilty.

In March 2020 Solé replaced Alfred Bosch as Catalonia's Minister of Foreign Action, Institutional Relations and Transparency. He was sworn in on 21 March 2020.

Solé was a member of the Cobla Jovenívola d’Agramunt (1987–2006), a youth cobla group, and the Agramunt scout group (1998–2004) where he was a group leader. He is a director of the Grup Caramellaire Aires del Sió.

== Personal life ==
Solé is married and has three children. He played for the basketball club in Agramunt.

== Electoral history ==
Electoral history of Bernat Solé
Election	Constituency	Party	Alliance	No.	Result
2006 regional	Province of Lleida	Republican Left of Catalonia		12	Not elected
2007 local	Agramunt	Republican Left of Catalonia	Republican Left of Catalonia-Acord Municipal	2	Elected
2011 local	Agramunt	Republican Left of Catalonia	Acord d'Esquerra-Acord Municipal	1	Elected
2015 local	Agramunt	Republican Left of Catalonia	Acord d'Esquerra-Acord Municipal	1	Elected
2015 regional	Province of Lleida	Republican Left of Catalonia	Junts pel Sí	4	Elected
2017 regional	Province of Lleida	Republican Left of Catalonia	Republican Left of Catalonia–Catalonia Yes	2	Elected
2019 local	Agramunt	Republican Left of Catalonia	Acord d'Esquerra-Acord Municipal	1	Elected
