= Roger Torrent =

Catalan politician and urban planner

The Right Honourable Roger Torrent
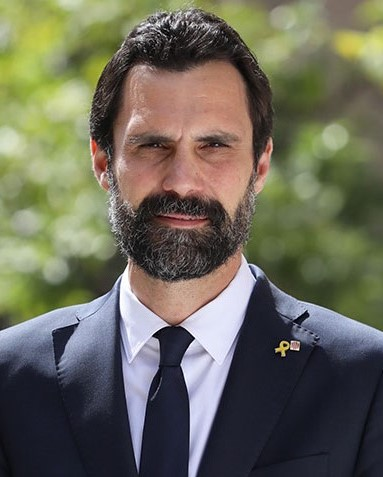
- Official portrait, 2021

Minister of Business and Labour of Catalonia
- In office 26 May 2021 – 12 August 2024
- Preceded by: Ramon Tremosa i Balcells
- Succeeded by: Miquel Sàmper

15th President of the Parliament of Catalonia
- In office 17 January 2018 – 12 March 2021
- Preceded by: Carme Forcadell
- Succeeded by: Laura Borràs

Member of the Parliament of Catalonia for the Province of Girona
- Incumbent
- Assumed office 17 December 2012

Mayor of Sarrià de Ter
- In office 16 June 2007 – 19 January 2018
- Preceded by: Nicolás Pichardo Delgado
- Succeeded by: Narcís Fajula

Member of the Municipality Council of Sarrià de Ter
- In office 1999–2018

Personal details
- Born: Roger Torrent i Ramió; 19 July 1979 (age 47) Sarrià de Ter, Catalonia, Spain
- Citizenship: Spanish
- Party: Republican Left of Catalonia
- Other political affiliations: Republican Left of Catalonia–Catalonia Yes
- Education: Autonomous University of Barcelona
- Occupation: Urban planner

Roger Torrent i Ramió (Catalan pronunciation: [ruˈʒe tuˈren]; born 19 July 1979) is a Spanish politician and urban planner from Catalonia. A former mayor of the municipality of Sarrià de Ter in north-eastern Spain, Torrent was President of the Parliament of Catalonia from January 2018 until March 2021. From 26 May 2021 to 12 August 2024, he was the Minister of Business and Work of Catalonia.

== Early life ==
Torrent was born on 19 July 1979 in Sarrià de Ter, a village in the Province of Girona in north-eastern Catalonia. He has a degree in political science and administration from the Autonomous University of Barcelona (UAB) and a master's degree in territorial and urban studies from the Polytechnic University of Catalonia and Pompeu Fabra University. He has a postgraduate degree in political communication from the UAB's Institut de Ciències Polítiques i Socials (Institute of Political and Social Sciences).

== Career ==
Torrent joined the Young Republican Left of Catalonia, the youth wing of the Republican Left of Catalonia (ERC), in 1998 and in 2000 joined the ERC. He contested the 1999 local elections as a Republican Left of Catalonia-Acord Municipal (ERC-AM) electoral alliance candidate in Sarrià de Ter and was elected. He was re-elected at the 2003 and 2007 local elections. After the 2007 election ERC-AM formed an administration with the Convergence and Union (CiU) and Torrent became Mayor of Sarrià de Ter. He was re-elected at the 2011 and 2015 local elections.

Torrent was the secretary of regional parliamentary policy in the federation of Girona from 2000 to 2008 and the ERC spokesperson on the Diputació de Girona between 2011 and 2012. He was a member of the Municipal Commission of Catalonia and the Local Government Commission of Catalonia between 2007 and 2011 and is a member of the executive of the Association of Catalan Municipalities.

Torrent contested the 2012 regional election as a Republican Left of Catalonia–Catalonia Yes (ERC–CatSí) electoral alliance candidate in the Province of Girona and was elected to the Parliament of Catalonia. He was re-elected at the 2015 and 2017 regional elections. He was elected President of the Parliament of Catalonia on 17 January 2018, defeating Citizens candidate José María Espejo-Saavedra Conesa by 65 votes to 56 votes. He is the youngest president of the Catalan Parliament.

According to an investigation by The Guardian and El País, Torrent's phone was hacked using the Pegasus software from the NSO Group.

== Personal life ==
Torrent is married and has two daughters. He is a keen runner and skier, and a fan of football and handball.

== Electoral history ==
Electoral history of Roger Torrent
Election	Constituency	Party	Alliance	No.	Result
1999 local	Sarrià de Ter	Republican Left of Catalonia	Republican Left of Catalonia-Acord Municipal		Elected
2003 local	Sarrià de Ter	Republican Left of Catalonia	Republican Left of Catalonia-Acord Municipal	1	Elected
2007 local	Sarrià de Ter	Republican Left of Catalonia	Republican Left of Catalonia-Acord Municipal	1	Elected
2011 local	Sarrià de Ter	Republican Left of Catalonia	Republican Left of Catalonia-Acord Municipal	1	Elected
2012 regional	Province of Girona	Republican Left of Catalonia	Republican Left of Catalonia–Catalonia Yes	1	Elected
2015 local	Sarrià de Ter	Republican Left of Catalonia	Republican Left of Catalonia-Acord Municipal	1	Elected
2015 regional	Province of Girona	Republican Left of Catalonia	Junts pel Sí	4	Elected
2017 regional	Province of Girona	Republican Left of Catalonia	Republican Left of Catalonia–Catalonia Yes	2	Elected
2021regional	Province of Girona	Republican Left of Catalonia	Republican Left of Catalonia–Catalonia Yes	3	Elected
