= Dolors Bassa =

Spanish politician

The Honourable Dolors Bassa i Coll
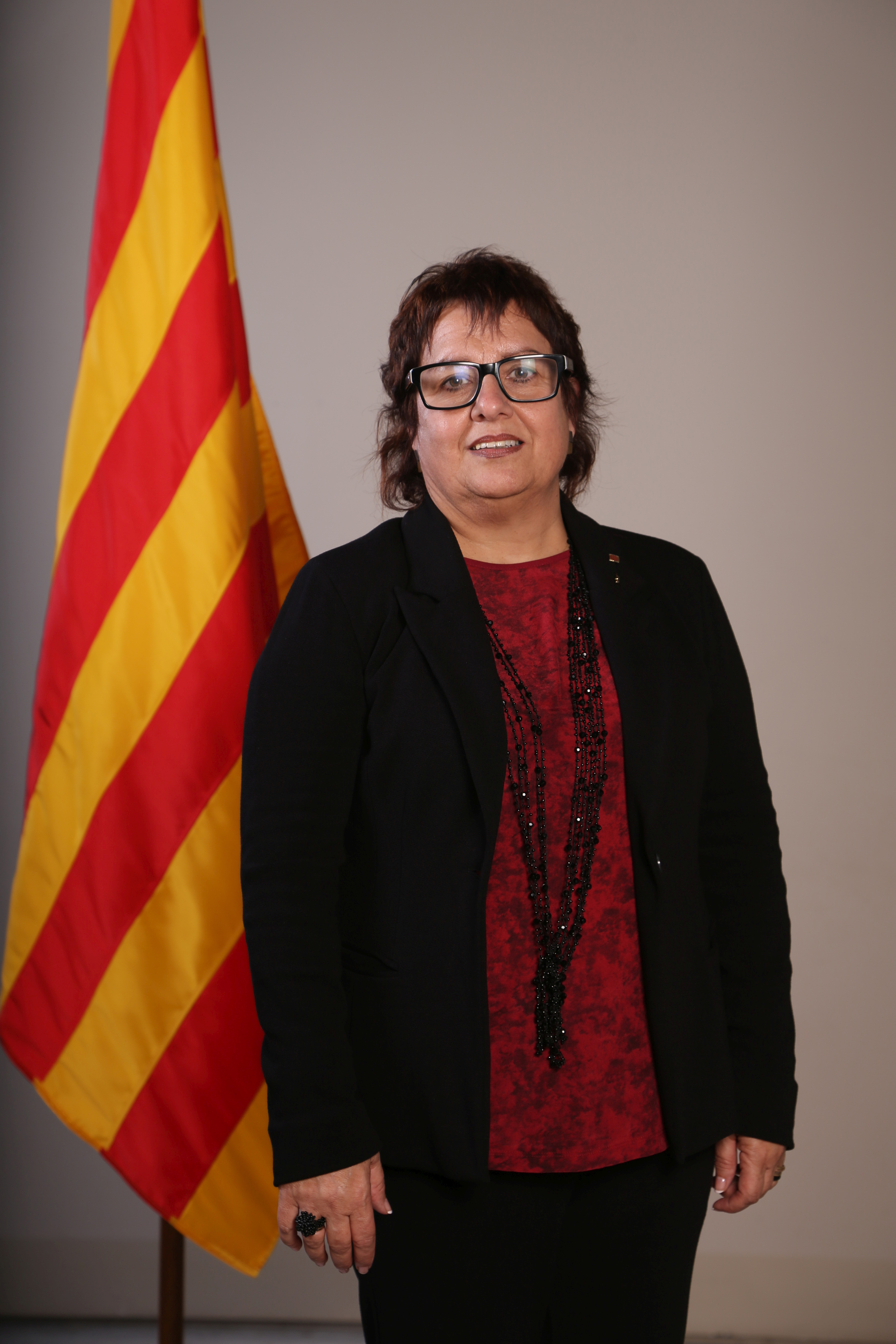

Minister of Labour, Social Affairs and Families of Catalonia
- In office 14 January 2016 – 27 October 2017
- President: Carles Puigdemont
- Preceded by: Felip Puig and Neus Munté
- Succeeded by: Chakir El Homrani (Direct rule until 2 June 2018)

Member of the Parliament of Catalonia for the Province of Girona
- In office 26 October 2015 – 22 March 2018

General Secretary of Unión General de Trabajadores of Girona
- In office 2008–2015

Local Councilor of Torroella de Montgrí
- In office 2007–2015

Personal details
- Born: 1959 (age 66–67) Torroella de Montgrí, Catalonia, Spain
- Citizenship: Spanish
- Party: Esquerra Republicana de Catalunya; Junts pel Sí
- Education: University of Girona; Open University of Catalonia
- Profession: Teacher and psychopedagogist

Dolors Bassa i Coll (born 1959) is an educator, educational psychologist and Spanish politician from Catalonia who held the position of Minister of Labour, Social Affairs and Families in the Generalitat de Catalunya until Spain dismissed the Catalan government on 27 October 2017. She is known for her syndicalist career in the major Spanish trade union, Unión General de Trabajadores. Since March 2018 she was remanded in custody, without bail, by order of the Supreme Court of Spain, accused of sedition and rebellion. She was sentenced on October 14, 2019, to 12 years in prison for sedition, as being responsible for devoting several thousand public schools as polling stations in the 1 October 2017 referendum. She was freed in June 2021 following a government pardon.

== Biography ==
Bassa was born in Torroella de Montgrí, Catalonia. She graduated in education from the University of Girona in 1979 and later on, in 2007, she obtained a licentiate degree in Psychopedagogy from the Open University of Catalonia. She worked as a Catalan language teacher in Palafrugell from 1979 to 1986 and in Torroella de Montgrí from 1986 to 2015.

As a politician, she started her career as a Local Councillor in Torroella de Montgrí for the Republican Left of Catalonia from 2007 to 2015. Bassa was also a member of the Generalitat's Vocational Training Council between 2007 and 2013, and also served on the steering committee of the Labour Services of the Generalitat (SOC) between 2006 and 2014.

In 2000 she started her activities with the syndicate Unión General de Trabajadores, UGT. In 2008 she was elected as General Secretary of the UGT of Girona and held the position until 2015.

During the 2015 Catalan regional election, Dolors Bassa was the sixth candidate of the pro-independence political coalition Junts pel Sí of Girona and was elected a member of the Parliament of Catalonia.

On 13 January 2016 she was offered the post of Minister of Labour, Social Affairs and Families in the government of Carles Puigdemont. Dolors Bassa accepted the position the following day. She was dismissed on 27 October 2017, along with the rest of the Catalan regional government, according to Article 155 of the Spanish Constitution, after being charged of several major constitutional infringements like declaring the independence of Catalonia.

=== Imprisonment ===
On November 2, Bassa was sent to prison in Madrid, where she shared a cell with her parliamentary colleague Meritxell Borràs. While behind bars, she "started helping some of the convicts to work towards getting a diploma or school certificate". She also obeyed orders to clean the halls while Borràs cleaned windows. She said that some prison workers were surprised at their willingness to work: "They thought that we would act ‘high and mighty’ and they saw that it wasn't the case." On November 11, her sister, Montserrat, appeared before a crowd in Torroella de Montgrí and issued a dramatic plea for Bassa's release.

In early December, the Spanish Supreme Court ordered Bassa's release and that of four other Catalan parliamentarians, Jordi Turull, Josep Rull, Carles Mundó and Raül Romeva, upon payment of 100,000 euros in bail apiece. Bassa had spent 33 days in prison, but still faced the possibility of a long prison term.

Thirteen days after her release from prison, Bassa said she did not feel free. "I feel a threat hanging above me, because they can still ask for up to 30 years in prison," she told the Catalan News Agency (ACN). She said she felt "afraid," but was "proud" of her political career with ERC. While she planned to return to the Catalan Parliament, she said she would not accept a cabinet position. "After what I went through," she said, "I don’t feel like it, my body is asking me not to."

She was re-elected member of the Catalan Parliament in the 2017 Catalan regional election, but on March 24, 2018, once the insufficient vote for the investiture of Jordi Turull as president of the Generalitat of Catalonia, she resigned as deputy, along with Marta Rovira and Carme Forcadell. On March 23, 2018, the Spanish Supreme Court judge, Tribunal Supremo, Pablo Llarena sent her back to prison, together with the former Speaker of the Parliament Carme Forcadell and the deposed ministers Raül Romeva, Josep Rull and Jordi Turull. Llarena argued for unconditional provisional bail after considering that there was a risk of flight and reiteration of the crimes for which they were being prosecuted.

On July 4, 2018, she was transferred to the Puig de les Basses Penitentiary Centre in Figueres. Since then, collective dinners and various support concentrations have been promoted in front of the prison to support her.

On February 1, 2019, she was transferred again to Alcalá-Meco, to attend the trial that was to start on February 12. She was charged with rebellion and misuse of public funds. The trial ended and the court adjourned to deliberate on 12 June 2019, and she was transferred back to the Figueres prison.

On 14 October 2019, she was sentenced to 12 years in prison and given a 12-year ban on holding public office. The verdict was delivered by seven judges by Spain's Supreme court, after a four-month trial that heard from 422 witnesses.

In February 2020, Bassa was given permission to leave the prison for eight hours a day, three days a week, in order to take care of her elderly mother, as allowed by Article 100.2 of the Prison Regulation.

In June 2021, she was freed by a government pardon along with eight other jailed former politicians. She is, however, still banned on holding public office.

== Personal life ==
She has two daughters. Her sister is a member of the Congress of Deputies Montserrat Bassa, elected in the 2019 general election.

== See also ==
- Education in Catalan
- Francesc Ferrer i Guàrdia
- Joaquim Forn
- Lluís Puig
