= Josep Rull =

Spanish politician (born 1968)

The Right Honourable Josep Rull MP
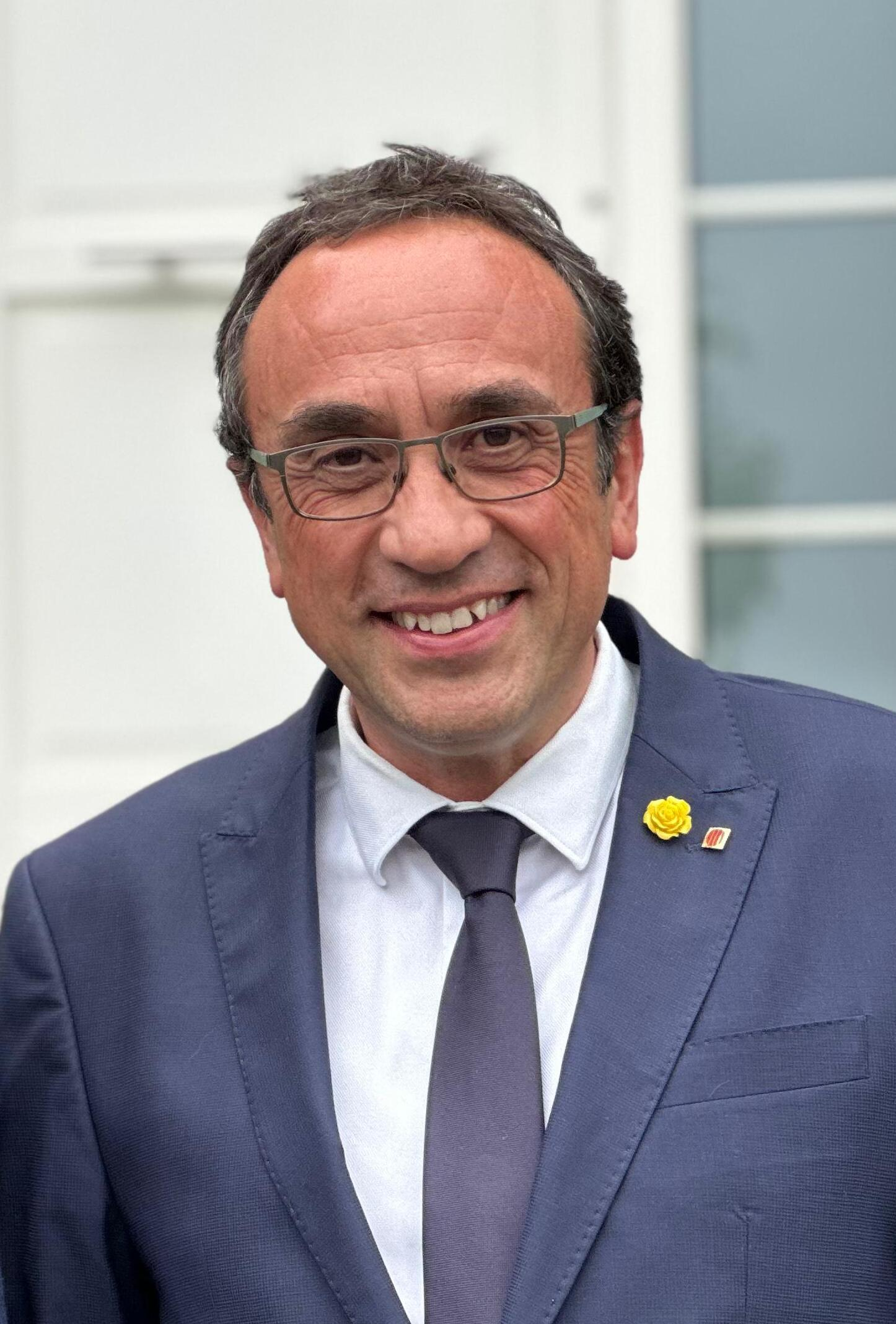
- Josep Rull in 2024

18th President of the Parliament of Catalonia
- Incumbent
- Assumed office 10 June 2024
- Vice President: Raquel Sans; David Pérez
- Preceded by: Anna Erra

Member of the Congress of Deputies
- In office 20 May 2019 – 24 May 2019 (suspended)
- Constituency: Tarragona

Minister of Territory and Sustainability of Catalonia
- In office 14 January 2016 – 27 October 2017
- President: Carles Puigdemont
- Preceded by: Santi Vila
- Succeeded by: Damià Calvet (Direct rule until 2 June 2018)

Acting Minister of Enterprise and Knowledge of Catalonia
- In office 27 October 2017 – 27 October 2017
- President: Carles Puigdemont
- Preceded by: Santi Vila
- Succeeded by: Maria Àngels Chacón (Direct rule until 2 June 2018)

Member of the Parliament of Catalonia
- Incumbent
- Assumed office 10 June 2024
- Constituency: Barcelona
- In office 22 September 1997 – 18 May 2019 (suspended from 10 July 2018 to 13 February 2023)
- Constituency: Barcelona

Personal details
- Born: Josep Rull i Andreu; 2 September 1968 (age 58) Terrassa, Spain
- Citizenship: Spanish
- Party: Junts (since 2020)
- Other political affiliations: CDC (1989–2016); PDeCAT (2016–2020)
- Education: Autonomous University of Barcelona
- Occupation: Lawyer

Josep Rull i Andreu (Catalan pronunciation: [ʒuˈzɛb ˈruʎ]; born 2 September 1968) is a Catalan politician serving as President of the Parliament of Catalonia since June 2024. He previously served as the Counselor of Territory and Sustainability of Catalonia at the Government of Carles Puigdemont between 2016 and 2017, when Spanish Rajoy's Government ceased the Catalan executive following the Catalan declaration of independence amid the application of Article 155 of the Spanish Constitution. Between 2 November and 4 December 2017, Rull was jailed and again on 23 March 2018. He was a member of the Catalan Parliament but on 10 July 2018 a Supreme Court judge suspended him as a deputy.

In the April 2019 Spanish general election, Rull was head of the Together for Catalonia candidacy for the Province of Tarragona. After being elected for the Congress of Deputies, he resigned as member of the Parliament of Catalonia on 18 May 2019. He was sworn in on 20 May 2019; on 24 May 2019, by a recommendation of the Supreme Court, the Board of the Congress suspended him and other Catalan independence leaders that were elected lawmakers. He was pardoned and released, along with the other 8 jailed Catalonia independence leaders, in June 2021. On 13 February 2023, he had his disqualification waived by the Supreme Court, allowing him again to run for office. On June 10, 2024, after being elected as deputy in that year's elections, he was sworn in as President of the Parliament of Catalonia.

== Biography ==
Graduate in Law from the Autonomous University of Barcelona, he is a member of the Illustrious Bar Association of Terrassa.

=== Local career ===
In 1986 he joined the "Nationalist Youth of Catalonia" (JNC) in Terrassa, and he was the general secretary of this organization between 1994 and 1998. In 1989 he joined the political party Democratic Convergence of Catalonia. Between 1993 and 1995 he worked as a collaborator of the legal services of the Catalan Association of Municipalities and later as the head of the Institutional Relations of the Board of Waste (1995–1997).

In local elections of 2003, he presented himself for the first time as the list head of CiU in Terrassa City Council, where he was the president of the Municipal Group of CiU in the Consorcio Egarenc. He also served as a member of the Informative Coordination Commissions with the Autonomous Organizations, General Services and Municipal Societies, in the Boards of Directors of the Municipal Institute of Culture and Sports (IMCET) and the Municipal Institute of Health and Social Welfare (IMSBS), of the General Meeting of Eco Equip, of the General Meeting of the Municipal Communication Society of Terrassa and of the General Meeting and member of the Board of Directors of EGARVIA. A .

=== Deputy at Catalan Parliament and Counselor of Territory and Sustainability ===
Deputy in the Parliament of Catalonia since 1997, during the VIII legislature he was the spokesman of the Parliamentary Group of Convergence and Union (CiU) and spokesman of this group to the Territorial Policy commission. In the IX legislature, in 2010, he was elected third secretary of the chamber, position for which he was again chosen in the 10th, in 2012.

On 14 January 2016, he became the Minister of Territory and Sustainability of the Government of Carles Puigdemont. On the same day he announced that he left the General Coordination of Democratic Convergence of Catalonia and that he would not appear to be the new leader of the party.

=== Imprisonment ===
On 27 October 2017, after the Parliament of Catalonia proclaimed the Catalan Republic, the Senate approved the measures proposed by the government under the protection of article 155 of the Spanish Constitution, including the dismissal of the President of the Generalitat of Catalonia and all of its Government of Catalonia, including Rull. Immediately after it was published in the Official State Gazette, followed by suspension of autonomy.

In November 2017 eight members of the Catalan Government, including Josep Rull, Oriol Junqueras, Jordi Turull, Meritxell Borràs, Carles Mundó, Raül Romeva, Dolors Bassa, Joaquim Forn and Santi Vila, who resigned few weeks ago, declared before the judge from the Audiencia Nacional Carmen Lamela for a rebellion crime. The prosecutor, requested unconditional jail for all members of the Catalan Government. On 4 December he and some other members of the Government were released on bail.

In the elections to the Parliament of Catalonia of 2017, Rull was elected deputy with the list of Together for Catalonia. On 23 March 2018, the magistrate of the Spanish Supreme Court Pablo Llarena ordered his entry to prison, as well as for presidential candidate Jordi Turull, former Speaker of the Parliament Carme Forcadell and the regional counselors Raül Romeva and Dolors Bassa. Llarena argued unconditional provisional bail without bail for five after considering that there was a risk of leakage and reiteration of the crimes for which they were prosecuted.

On 4 July 2018, Rull was transferred to Lledoners Prison in Catalonia. Since then, several concentrations of support took place at the door of the prison. From 3 December until 20 December 2018, he went on a hunger strike. Same month, the International Association of Democratic Lawyers issued a statement requesting the release of "Catalan political prisoners". On 1 February 2019, he was transferred back to the Madrilenian prison of Soto del Real to face the trial that began on 12 February 2019. and ended and was remitted to decision on 12 June 2019. On 14 October 2019, he was sentenced to a 10 years and a half prison term and disqualification for the sedition crime.

=== Pardon ===
He was pardoned and released, along with the other 8 jailed Catalonia independence leaders, in June 2021. Prime Minister Pedro Sánchez said that he pardoned them because it was the best decision for Spain and Catalonia but did not overturn their bans from holding public office.
