= Montserrat Bassa =

Spanish politician (born 1965)

Montserrat Bassa MP
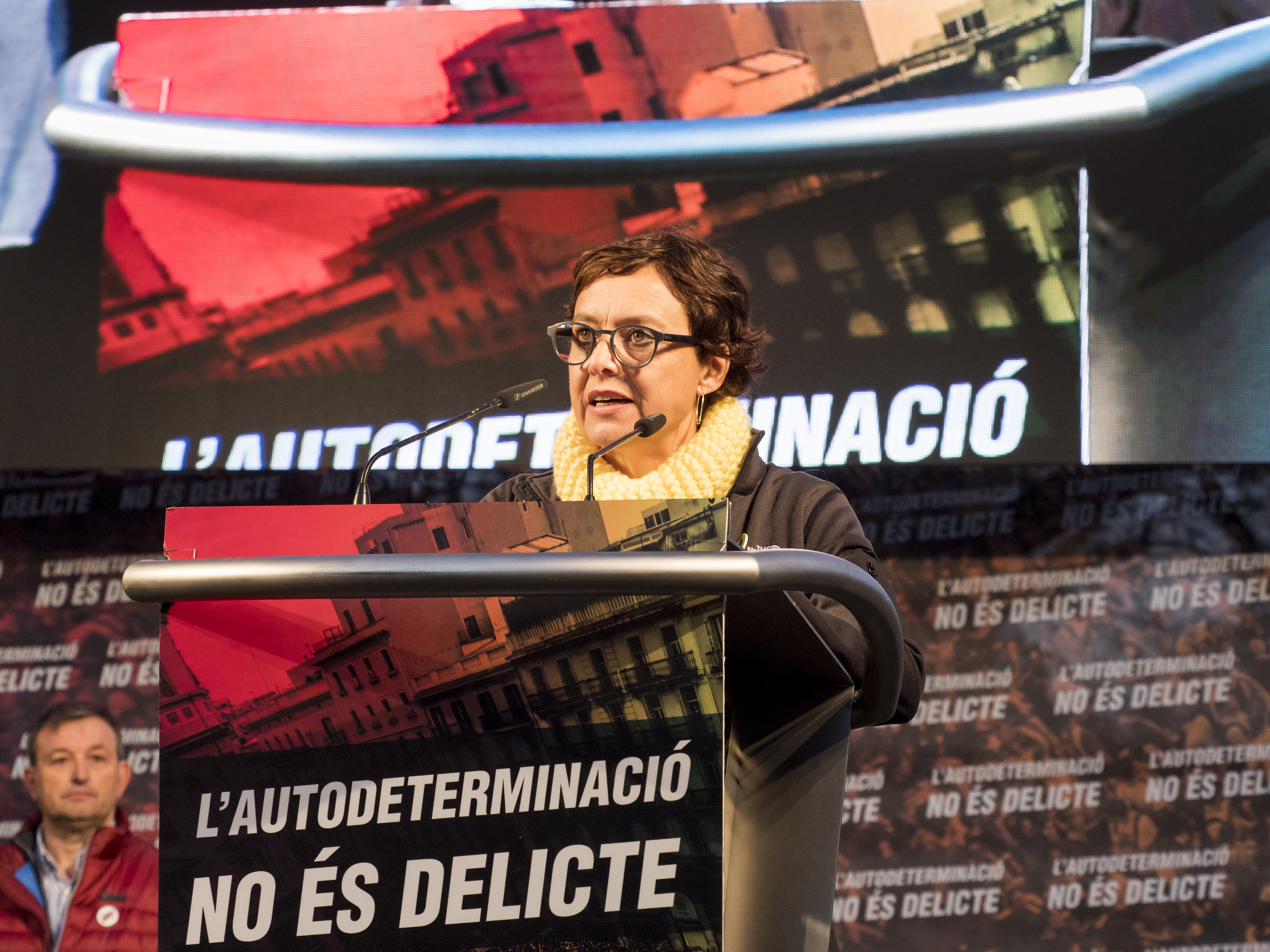
- Bassa in February 2019

Member of the Congress of Deputies
- Incumbent
- Assumed office 16 May 2019
- Constituency: Girona

Personal details
- Born: Montserrat Bassa i Coll; 20 April 1965 (age 60) Torroella de Montgrí, Catalonia, Spain
- Party: Independent
- Other political affiliations: Republican Left of Catalonia–Sovereigntists

Montserrat Bassa i Coll (born 20 April 1965) is a Spanish politician from Catalonia who serves as Member of the Congress of Deputies of Spain.

== Early life ==
Bassa was born on 20 April 1965 in Torroella de Montgrí, Catalonia. She is the sister of jailed Catalan minister Dolors Bassa.

== Career ==
Bassa was director of Escola d'Adults de Figueres and later worked for the Department of Education at the ancient ruins of Empúries.

Bassa is a founding member of the Catalan Association for Civil Rights (Associació Catalana pels Drets Civils) which represents families of Catalan "political prisoners and exiles". She contested the 2019 general election as a Republican Left of Catalonia–Sovereigntists electoral alliance candidate in the Province of Girona and was elected to the Congress of Deputies.

== Electoral history ==
Electoral history of Montserrat Bassa
Election	Constituency	Party	Alliance	No.	Result
2019 general	Province of Girona	Independent	Republican Left of Catalonia–Sovereigntists	1	Elected
