= Marta Rovira =

Spanish lawyer and politician (born 1977)

Marta Rovira i Vergés
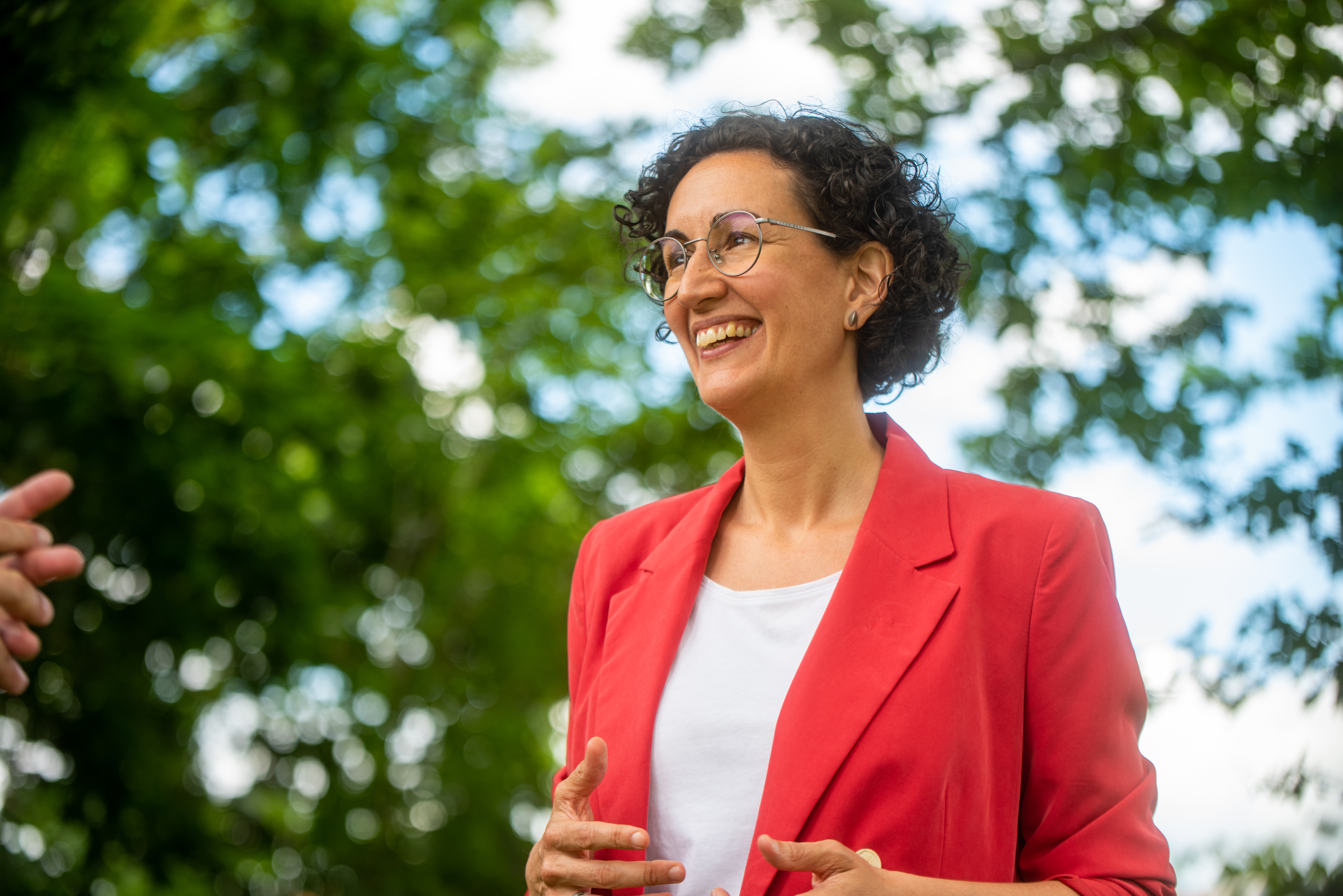

Secretary-General of Republican Left of Catalonia
- In office 17 September 2011 – 14 December 2024
- President: Oriol Junqueras
- Preceded by: Joan Ridao
- Succeeded by: Elisenda Alamany

President of Republican Left of Catalonia
- Acting
- In office 10 June 2024 – 14 December 2024
- Preceded by: Oriol Junqueras
- Succeeded by: Oriol Junqueras

Member of the Parliament of Catalonia
- In office 17 December 2012 – 22 March 2018
- Succeeded by: Assumpció Laïlla
- Constituency: Barcelona

Personal details
- Born: 25 January 1977 (age 49) Vic, Catalonia, Spain
- Party: Esquerra Republicana de Catalunya
- Education: Pompeu Fabra University; Open University of Catalonia
- Profession: Lawyer and politician

Marta Rovira i Vergés (born 25 January 1977, in Vic) is a Spanish lawyer and politician. She was the General Secretary of Republican Left of Catalonia between 2011 and 2024.

== Biography ==
Some of her ancestors were involved in local politics. Her maternal grandfather, Francesc Vergés Ordeig, was the mayor of Sant Pere de Torelló between 1956 and 1965. One of her great-grandfathers on her father's side, Jaume Rivera Camps, was the mayor of Prats de Lluçanès between 1939 and 1941.

Rovira holds a degree in Law from Pompeu Fabra University and in Political sciences and Public administration from the Open University of Catalonia.

She has worked as a lawyer, has been a professor of Administrative Law at the Escola de Policia de Catalunya (2003–2007), and the head of the Support Services of the Catalan Agency for Development Cooperation (2007–2011).

Previously, she was a member secretary of the Young Lawers of Catalonia (2006–2007), head of the Young Lawyers Group of Vic (2004–2006) and on their behalf she was a member of the Governing Body of the Vic Bar Association, also a member of the Solidarity Platform of the UPF (1999) and she was responsible for Jurists Without Borders, a student association (1997–1999). She participated in the group of Castellers Sagals d'Osona and a member of the Red Cross.

=== Political career ===
Marta Rovira is a member of Esquerra Republicana since 2005. During the 25th National Congress of the party, held in 2008, she was elected National Secretary for International, European and Cooperation politics. That same year, and until 2012, she was also the General Secretary of the European Free Alliance.

At the 26th National Congress (2011) she was elected general Secretary of Esquerra Republicana. It was then that she assumed the leadership within the party, together with Oriol Junqueras, president of Esquerra Republicana.

In the 2012 Catalan Elections, she was elected to the Catalan Parliament and between 2012 and 2015 she was the spokesperson of the Esquerra Republicana parliamentary group. In 2015 she stood again in the Catalan elections, this time as part of the pro-independence coalition Junts pel Sí, and she was also elected representative and spokesperson of the parliamentary group.

During the 2017 elections to the Catalan Parliament, Marta Rovira and Oriol Junqueras headed Esquerra Republicana de Catalunya – Catalunya Sí candidacy in Barcelona constituency. Esquerra Republicana won 32 seats.

Rovira's main political motivations are the defence of human rights, especially women's rights, social justice, and the independence of Catalonia. Rovira stands for republicanism as a model that considers the general interest and the common good, equal opportunities, transparency and zero corruption. As a pro-independence activist, Rovira argues that republican principles can only be achieved in a Catalan Republic, and this must be won in a referendum that allows Catalans to choose their future.

=== Court case and exile ===
On 22 December 2017, she was charged by the Spanish Supreme Court for an alleged crime of rebellion for her participation during the organisation of the referendum on self-determination on 1 October 2017. She was summoned to testify by the same court on 19 February 2018 and eventually released on bail of €60,000. On 21 March 2018, judge Pablo Llarena summoned those investigated in the case to 23 March to inform them of the indictment and review their provisional release status.

On 22 March 2018, after the failed vote for the investiture of Jordi Turull as president of the Generalitat de Catalunya, Rovira resigned, along with Carme Forcadell and Dolors Bassa, from her seat as a member of Parliament. The following day, she decided not to appear before the Supreme Court, claiming that she did not have enough judicial guarantees, and went into exile in Switzerland, where she currently lives.

On the same day, 23 March 2018, judge Pablo Llarena activated a European and international arrest warrant and an extradition request against Rovira, in addition to those reactivated against Carles Puigdemont, Antoni Comín, Lluís Puig, Meritxell Serret and Clara Ponsatí.

On 19 July 2018, in view of the decision of the German judiciary against the surrender of Carles Puigdemont for the crime of rebellion, Llarena withdrew all European and international arrest warrants issued, including Rovira's.

She remained in exile in Switzerland until July 2024. She couldn't return to Spain since she was under a warrant for her arrest and imprisonment. In case she left Switzerland, she would have to face a European arrest warrant.

From Geneva, she worked as a General Secretary of Esquerra Republicana and also on many projects promoting policy research on cultural and linguistic diversity, the right to self-determination, conflict resolution and human rights, among others, at European and international level. In July 2024 she crossed the Spanish border and returned to Catalonia, after the court case was shelved.

=== Personal life ===
She is married to Raúl Presseguer and had a daughter, Agnès, in 2011.

== Books about Marta Rovira ==
- Eva Piquer i Vinent (2014). Marta Rovira, cada dia més a prop (in Catalan). Raval Edicions / Proa. ISBN 978-84-9809-285-1.

== Published books ==
- Oriol Junqueras & Marta Rovira (2020). Tornarem a vèncer (i com ho farem) (in Catalan). Ara llibres. ISBN 978-84-17804-57-2.

== See also ==
- 2017-18 Spanish constitutional crisis
