= Fira Mediterrania in Manresa =

Spanish performing arts festival

Fira Mediterrània of Manresa (Catalonia-Spain) is a performing arts fair rooted in Mediterranean tradition. It has two main areas of focus: popular culture (based on a dialogue between traditional, regional culture and creative innovation) and world music. It has been held every year since 1998 and has become a setting for exchange professionals that sell and buy productions.

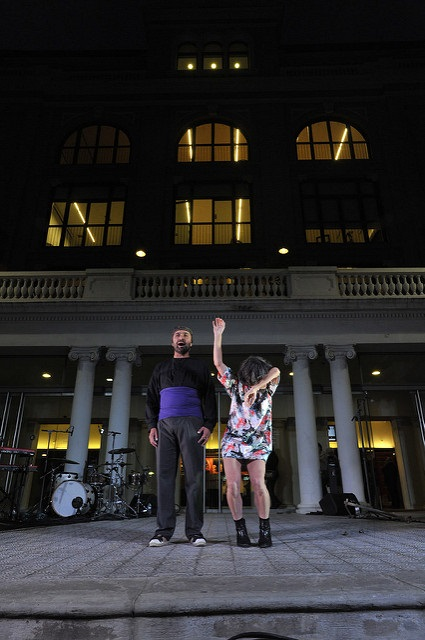
"A vore" at Fira Mediterrània de Manresa 2015 (Photo: Josep Tomàs)

Most activities are open to the public at large and the Fira uses a range of stage areas in the city centre. Despite this, activities exclusively aimed at industry professionals are a cornerstone of the Fira. These include industry conferences, a recruitment place, partnership network meetings and presentations. Together with FiràTarrega (the international market for performing arts),

Mercat de Música Viva de Vic (Vic live music market), the Sismòfraf d'Olot, the Mostra d'Igualada and the Fira Trapezi, the Fira Mediterrània completes the Generalitat (Regional Government) of Catalonia's map of artistic marketplaces in Catalonia.

Fira Mediterrània is part of the Anna Lindh Foundation, the Spanish Performing Arts Trade Fair Coordinator (COFAE), the European Forum of Worldwide Music Festivals (EFWMF), the International Network for Contemporary Performing Arts (IETM) and the Apropa Cultura program.

== Characteristics ==
Fira is an interdisciplinary event and the programme covers all artistic languages – visual arts, circus, dance, exhibitions, music, storytelling and theatre. The programmed shows are in different formats - small, medium or large-scale - in venues or in the street, aimed both at adult and at family audiences.

28th Fira was held from 9 to 12 October 2025.

Arts projects can be submitted under two main themes:

- Traditional Culture, based on elements that include the transfer of heritage, the crossover between contemporary creation and traditional regional culture, participation and the increase of the social foundations of culture. Suitable projects: visual performing arts, circus, dance, exhibitions, music, storytelling, theatre, community and/or participatory shows, family shows, among others.
- World Music and folk, traditional or contemporary music that is connected to its local region, with special emphasis on the Mediterranean.

Fira Business Area is a networking hub for artists, creators, booking agents, cultural agents, public and private institutions, third sector organisations and cultural industry associations. It promotes discussion on new and emerging opportunities from an international perspective, based on themes that include, among others, the relationship between tradition and performing arts, the community, participation, and the benefits to society stemming from cultural initiatives.

For three days, the Fira Business Area becomes a nerve centre of professional activity, with exhibitions, a professional conference, presentations of cultural projects, showcases, and speed dating and networking events.

An innovative, enriching aspect of these initiatives is the fact that at the Fira, unlike other forums for debate, some of the projects can also be seen on stage.

Fira Mediterrània Manresa-Catalonia is made possible through the Generalitat of Catalonia's Culture Department and Manresa City Council, which comprise the organising foundation.

== Artistic direction ==
Former and current artistic directors of the Fira Mediterrània Manresa-Catalonia include:

- Lluís Puig (1998–2000).
- Jordi Bertran (2001–2005).
- Toni Xuclà (2006–2007).
- Tere Almar (2008–2011).
- David Ibáñez (2012-2018).
- Jordi Fosas (2019...)

== Discography ==
- 16a Fira Mediterrània de Manresa, Enderrock, 216, 2013.
- 15a Fira Mediterrània de Manresa, Enderrock, 204, 2012.
- 14a Fira Mediterrània de Manresa, Sons de la Mediterrània, 24, 2011.
- 13a Fira Mediterrània de Manresa, Sons de la Mediterrània, 18, 2010.
- 12 Mediterrània. Fira d'espectacles d'arrel tradicional, Sons de la Mediterrània, 13, 2009.
- 11 Mediterrània. Fira d'espectacles d'arrel tradicional, Sons de la Mediterrània, 7, 2008.
- 10ª Mediterrània. Fira d'espectacles d'arrel,Sons de la Mediterrània, 1 / World Music Magazine, 87, 2007.
- 9a Fira Mediterrània d'espectacles d'arrel tradicional, Folc, 31 / World Music Magazine, 81, 2006.
- 8ª Fira d'espectacles d'arrel tradicional Mediterrània, Folc, 25, 2005.
- Mediterrània. 7ª Fira d'espectacles d'arrel tradicional, Folc, 19, 2004.
- 6ª Fira d'espectacles d'arrel tardicional a Manresa, Folc, 14, 2003.
- Fira d'espectacles d'arrel tradicional Manresa, Folc, 9, 2002.
- Fira d'espectacles d'arrel tradicional, Folc, 5, 2001.
- 3a Fira d'espectacles d'arrel tradicional de Manresa, Folc, 1, 2000.
