= Albert Batet =

Spanish politician (born 1979)

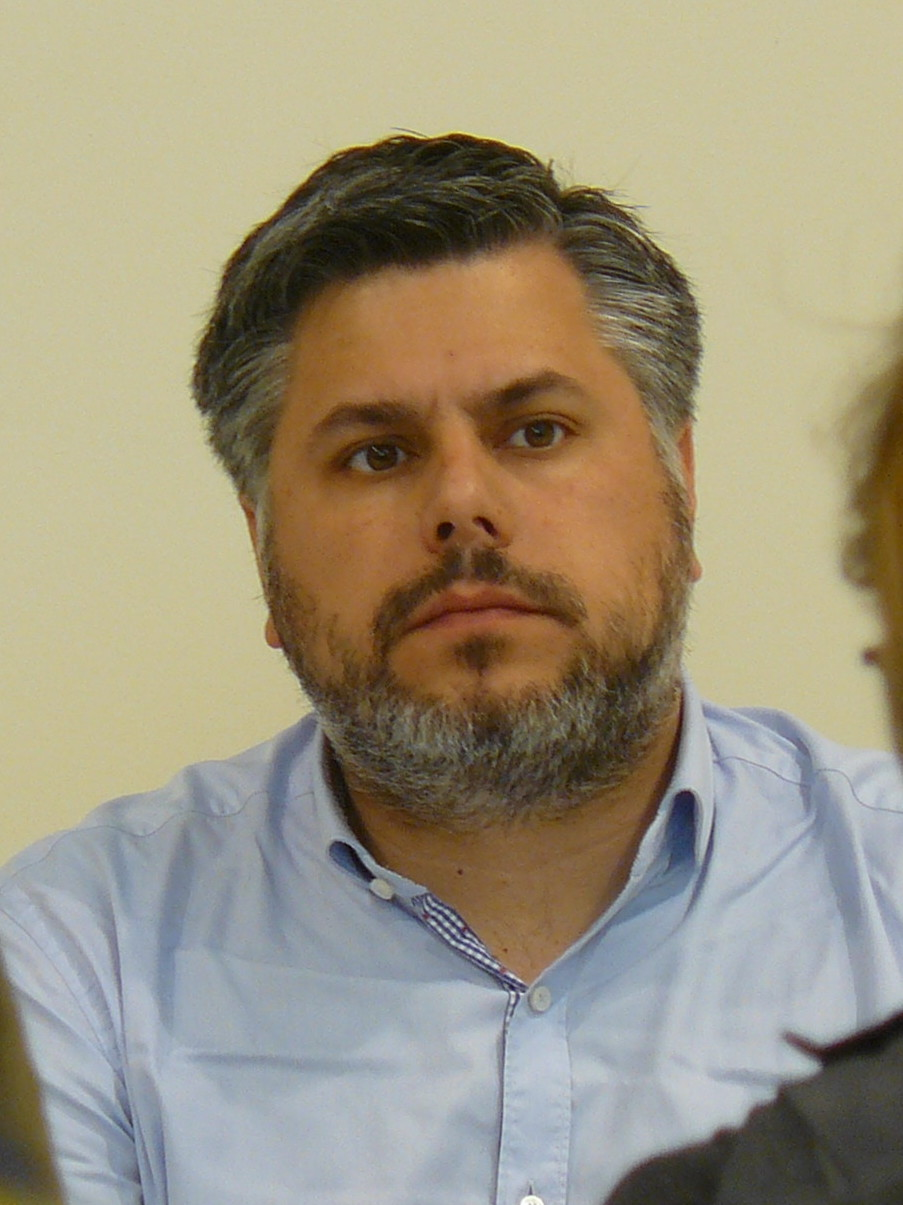
- Batet in 2015

Member of the Parliament of Catalonia
- Incumbent
- Assumed office 17 December 2012
- Constituency: Tarragona (2012–2024); Barcelona (2024–present)

Personal details
- Born: 5 March 1979 (age 47)
- Party: Together for Catalonia (since 2020)

Albert Batet i Canadell (born 5 March 1979) is a Spanish politician serving as a member of the Parliament of Catalonia since 2012. From 2008 to 2019, he served as mayor of Valls.
