= Nacho Martín Blanco =

Spanish politician (born 1982)

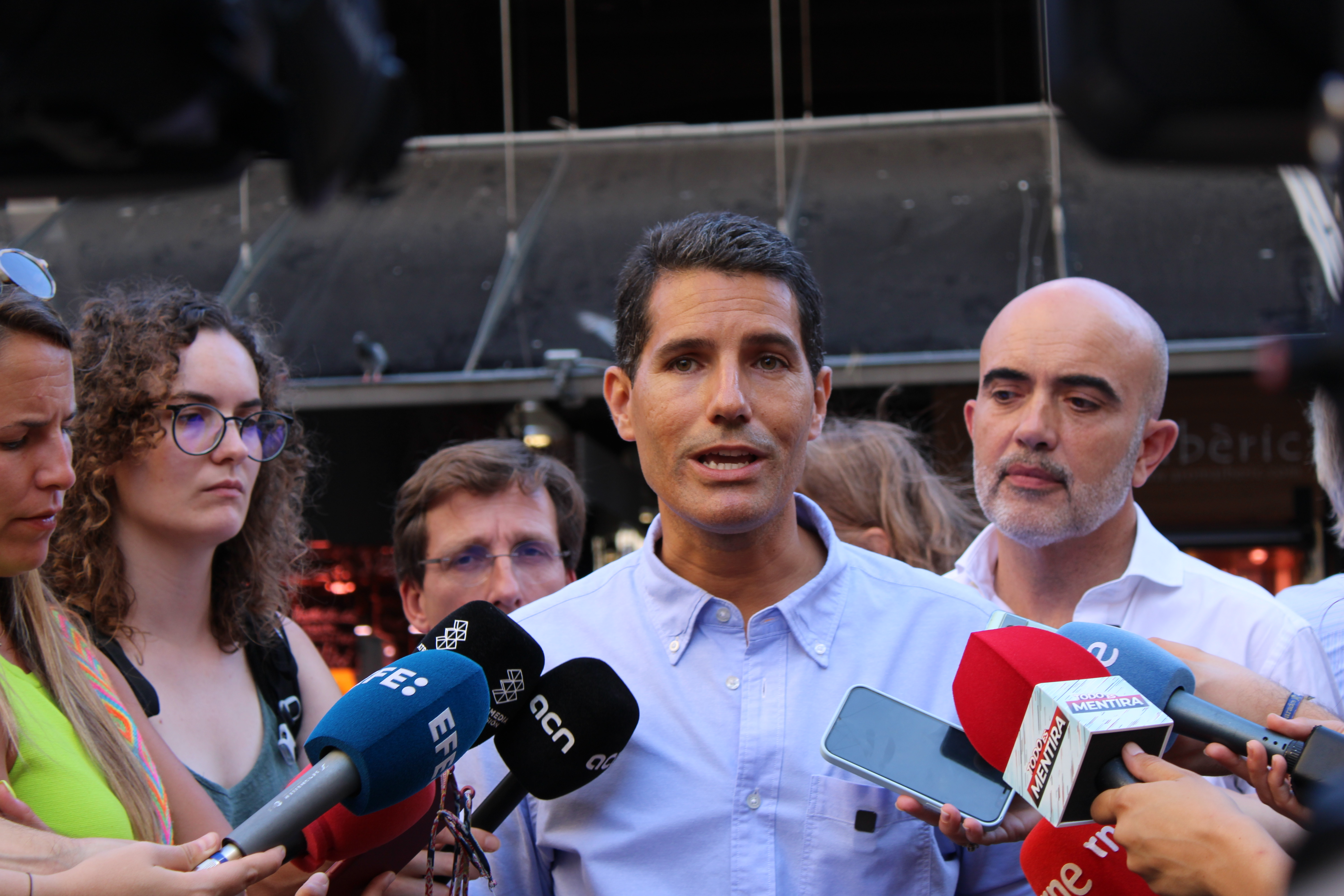
- Martín in 2023

Member of the Congress of Deputies
- Incumbent
- Assumed office 17 August 2023
- Constituency: Barcelona

Personal details
- Born: 2 August 1982 (age 43)
- Party: People's Party (since 2023)
- Other political affiliations: Citizens (2017–2023)

Ignacio de Loyola Martín Blanco (born 2 August 1982) is a Spanish politician serving as a member of the Congress of Deputies since 2023. From 2018 to 2023, he was a member of the Parliament of Catalonia.
