= Carles Castillo =

Spanish politician (born 1975)

The Illustrious Carles Castillo MP

Member of the Parliament of Catalonia for the Province of Tarragona
- In office 26 October 2015 – 10 September 2020

City Councilor of Tarragona
- In office 2003–2015

Personal details
- Born: Carles Castillo Rosique; 1975 (age 50–51) Tarragona, Spain
- Party: Socialists' Party of Catalonia (until 2020)
- Children: 1
- Education: Autonomous University of Barcelona

Carles Castillo i Rosique (born 1975), is a Spanish Catalan lawyer and politician.

Their parents are original of Cartagena, Region of Murcia. He graduated in Law from the Autonomous University of Barcelona, specializing in Business Law and Urban Law, and has worked for the Kesse Advocats Buffete in Tarragona, of which he is a member. During his studenthood he was a member of the secretariat of students of the Rovira i Virgili University for the AJEC.

Between 1999 and 2004 he was the first secretary of the Socialist Youth of Catalonia in the Camp de Tarragona. In the Spanish 2003 municipal elections, 2007, 2011 and in 2015 municipal elections of 2003, 2007, 2011 and 2015, was elected councilor of the city council of Tarragona. He was the councilor for Citizen Security, Mobility and Licenses (2007–2011) and deputy mayor in charge of Citizen Security and Urban Planning (2011–2015). He was elected to the elections to the Parliament of Catalonia in 2015, which he led the provincial list and those of 2017.

He abandoned the Socialists' Party of Catalonia and his seat at the Catalan parliament in September 2020 after some disagreements with the party's leadership.
