= Marta Moreta i Rovira =

Spanish Catalan pedagogue and politician

The Illustrious Marta Moreta MP

Member of the Parliament of Catalonia for the Province of Barcelona
- Incumbent
- Assumed office 26 October 2015

City Councilor of Manlleu
- Incumbent
- Assumed office 2011

Personal details
- Born: 20 January 1969 (age 57) Vic, Catalonia, Spain
- Party: Socialists' Party of Catalonia
- Education: University of Girona; University of Vic; University of Barcelona

Marta Moreta i Rovira (born 20 January 1969), is a Spanish Catalan pedagogue and politician.

== Biography ==
She has a degree in pedagogy from the University of Girona and holds a degree in teaching from the University of Vic. She subsequently obtained a postgraduate in Local Government Management from the University of Barcelona and worked as director of the Community of Municipalities of Sant Hipòlit and Les Masies de Voltregà and head of services of the city council of the Masies de Voltregà from 2003 to 2015.

In 2008, she joined the PSC, a party of which has been the Municipal Policy Secretary and councilor of the city council of Manlleu in the municipal elections of 2011. She has been elected to the elections to the Parliament of Catalonia in 2015 and those of 2017 after the dissolution of the Parliament in application of article 155 of the Spanish Constitution.
