= Matías Alonso Ruiz =

Spanish politician (born 1952)

- Born: 8 April 1952; La Línea de la Concepción
- Occupations: Politician, officer, businessperson, columnist
- Political party: Citizens
- Website: matias.alonsodepedro.net

Matías Alonso Ruiz (born 8 April 1952 in La Línea de la Concepción) is a Spanish politician who was secretary general of Citizens-Party of the citizens. He was also a regional deputy of Catalonia from 2021 to 2024.
