= Daniel Serrano =

Spanish politician (born 1976)

Member of the Congress of Deputies
- In office 1 December 2011 – 27 October 2015
- Constituency: Barcelona

Personal details
- Born: 18 June 1976 (age 49)
- Party: People's Party

Daniel Serrano Coronado (born 18 June 1976) is a Spanish politician. He was a member of the Parliament of Catalonia from 2019 to 2021 and from 2022 to 2024. From 2011 to 2015, he was a member of the Congress of Deputies.
