= Pol Gibert =

Spanish politician (born 1987)

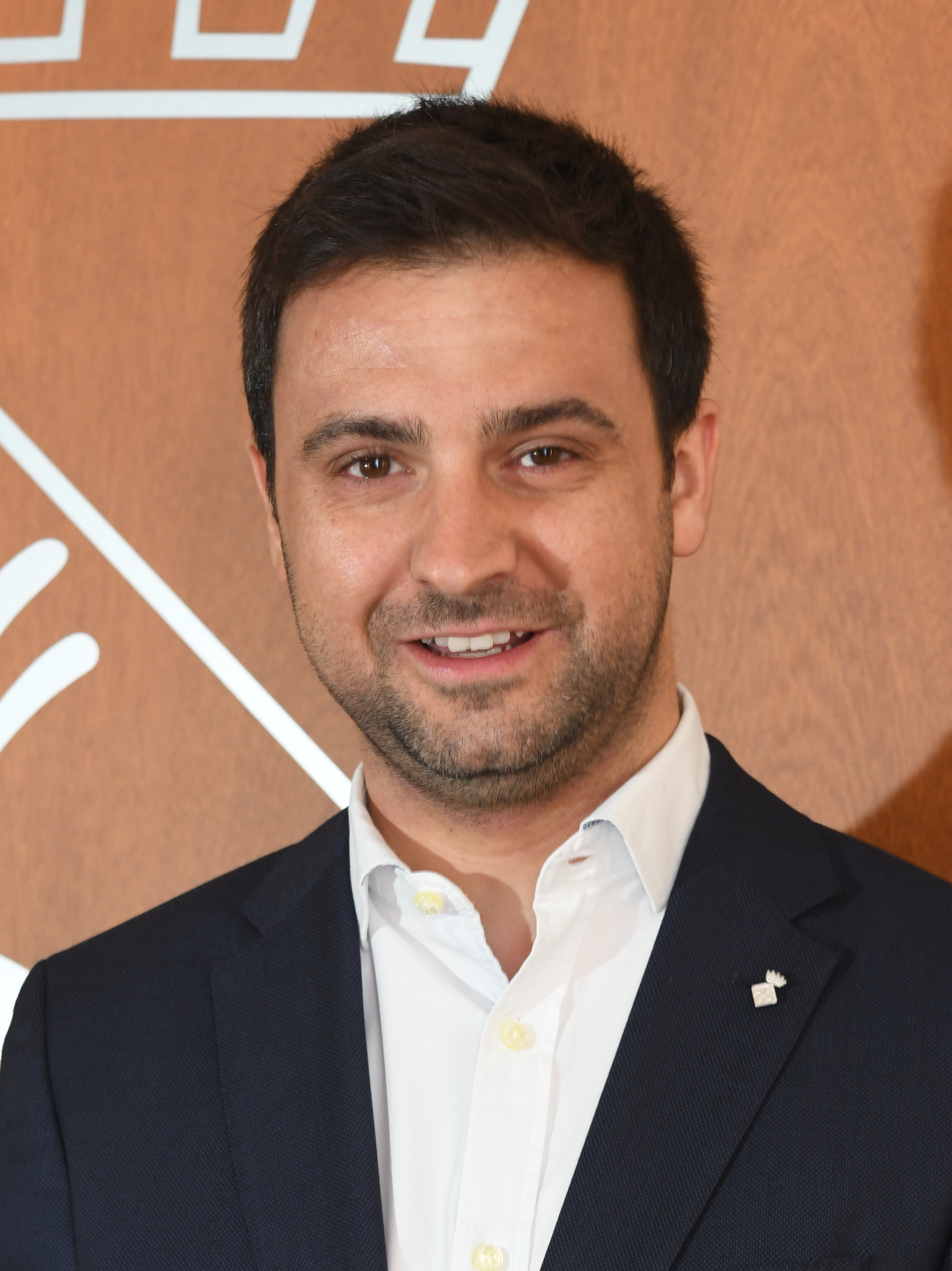
- Gibert in 2019

Member of the Parliament of Catalonia
- In office 26 October 2015 – 28 August 2024
- Constituency: Barcelona

Personal details
- Born: 4 April 1987 (age 39)
- Party: Socialists' Party of Catalonia

Pol Gibert Horcas (born 4 April 1987) is a Spanish politician serving as secretary general of business and labour of Catalonia since 2024. From 2015 to 2024, he was a member of the Parliament of Catalonia.
