= Najat Driouech =

Catalan-Moroccan politician

The Most Illustrious Najat Driouech MP
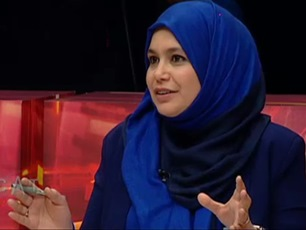

Member of the Parliament of Catalonia
- Incumbent
- Assumed office 17 January 2018
- Constituency: Barcelona

Personal details
- Born: Najat Driouech Ben Moussa; 1981 (age 44–45) Asilah, Morocco
- Citizenship: Spanish, Moroccan
- Party: Republican Left of Catalonia
- Education: University of Barcelona
- Occupation: Activist, politician

Najat Driouech Ben Moussa (born 1981) is a politician for the Republican Left of Catalonia (ERC). She has served in the Parliament of Catalonia since the 2017 elections, and is the first Muslim woman in that legislature.

== Biography ==
Driouech was born in 1981 in Asilah, Morocco and moved to El Masnou in Catalonia in 1990. She holds qualifications in Arab Studies and Social Work, and has taught the former at the University of Barcelona; she was the first female of El Masnou's Muslim community to have a university education. Since 2001, she had worked for El Masnou city council in migrant-related affairs.

Driouech was elected to the Parliament of Catalonia for the Republican Left of Catalonia in the Province of Barcelona in the 2017 elections. She became the first Muslim woman elected to the legislature, while two men from the faith had previously served. She has worn a hijab since 2009, and has said "I have the right to be different, exactly the same as if a colleague decided to go dressed in pink".

In December 2018, Driouech made a parliamentary speech against the far-right party Vox, after they entered their first regional parliament in Andalusia. Vox leader Santiago Abascal shared the video to his followers with the comment "And this one calls us male chauvinists... she should look at her own house first!" in reference to her religion.

For the 2021 Catalan elections, Driouech was moved from tenth to fourth in the ERC's list. Three years later, she took the same position, and the party had 12 members elected by the constituency.
