= Elena Fort =

Spanish Catalan football executive and politician (born 1970)

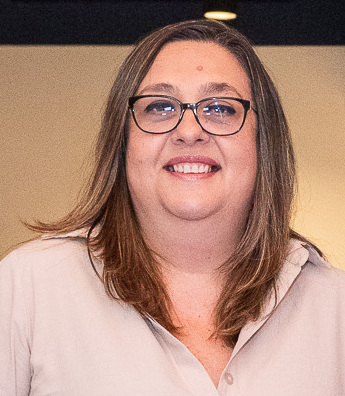
- Elena Fort in July 2024

Vice President of Barcelona
- In office 17 March 2021 – 9 February 2026 Serving with Rafael Yuste and Antonio Escudero
- President: Joan Laporta
- Preceded by: Pau Vilanova Vila-Abadal

Personal details
- Born: Maria Elena Fort i Cisneros; 1970 (age 55–56) Barcelona, Catalonia, Spain
- Party: Junts per Catalunya
- Education: University of Barcelona

Maria Elena Fort i Cisneros (born 1970) is a Spanish Catalan lawyer, football executive and politician, who served as Institutional Vice President of Barcelona and spokeswoman of the Board of Directors between 2021 and 2026 under the presidency of Joan Laporta. She has also served twice as a member of the Parliament of Catalonia.

== Career ==
Fort was born in 1970 in Barcelona, Spain. She got a degree in law for the University of Barcelona. She specialised in public law and urban planning, founding the law firm BRF Abogados SLP in 1996. Fort is a member of the Barcelona Bar Association.

=== Executive of Barcelona ===
In 2008, Barcelona president Joan Laporta called her to join the Board of Directors following the mass resignation of executives, and entrusted her with institutional and heritage matters, an office Fort held until 2010 when Laporta left the presidency. She subsequently confronted the new Board of Directors over the suspicious handling of the club's accounts, which ended up in court, a fact that put Fort under pressure and in the liability proceedings.

She was part of Laporta's candidacy in the 2015 presidential election, which Josep Maria Bartomeu won.

Laporta ran again for the presidency of Barça in the 2021 elections, with Fort as member of his candidacy which he presented in December 2020. During the campaign, Fort defended the existence of gender quotas and championed the role of women at Barcelona, as well as the desire for a female president. Following Laporta's victory on 24 January 2021, Fort took office as the only woman on the board of Barcelona. On 19 March 2021, Fort was appointed by the Board as the new Institutional Vice President of the club, succeeding Pau Vilanova Vila-Abadal, and on 31 March became its spokeswoman.

In November 2025, Fort refused to rename the Camp Nou after Leo Messi, saying that there were better ways to honour him.

Following Barcelona's indictment in the Negreira case at the end of 2025, Fort was called to appear before the judge on 27 January 2026 as its representative.

On 9 February 2026, Laporta, Fort and eight other members of Barcelona's Board resigned on in order to be eligible for reelection in the March 2026 elections, as required by the by-laws. Laporta's candidacy won a landslide victory on 16 March 2026.

=== Political career ===
Fort had a brief stint in Catalan politics when she was part of the Junts per Catalunya candidacy led by Carles Puigdemont in the 2017 early regional election to the Parliament, but she did not win a seat. Following the resignation of several deputies, Fort obtained her seat as an MP in 2019, until the dissolution of parliament in December of that year. She was once again part of Junts' list of candidates for the 2021 regional election, but she did not win a seat either. After the resignation of Jaume Alonso-Cuevillas as deputy, Fort became again member of the Parliament of Catalonia in March 2024, an office she held until few days later.

In March 2026, Fort it was reported as Carles Puigdemont’s choice for the 2027 Barcelona mayoral race, but she was soon ruled out.

== Personal life ==
She got married with Jordi Sirera on 20 March 2015 in a ceremony officiated by Joan Laporta while he was a councillor for Barcelona City Council. They had two children; Sirera died in April 2015 from cancer.
