= José María Espejo-Saavedra Conesa =

Spanish politician (born 1976)

José María Espejo-Saavedra MP
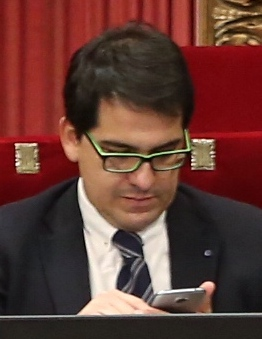

Member of the Congress of Deputies
- Incumbent
- Assumed office 13 May 2019
- Constituency: Barcelona

Member of the Catalan Parliament
- In office 1 November 2006 – 9 May 2019
- Constituency: Barcelona

Personal details
- Born: José María Espejo-Saavedra Conesa; 22 July 1976 (age 50) Madrid, Spain
- Party: Citizens-Party of the Citizenry
- Spouse: Denise
- Children: 2
- Education: Autonomous University of Madrid
- Occupation: Politician and Lawyer

José María Espejo-Saavedra Conesa (born 22 July 1976, in Madrid) is a Spanish politician serving as Member of the Congress of Deputies and chair of the Congress' Committee on International Cooperation for Development since 2019. He is a member of the Citizens party.

In previous years, Espejo-Saavedra has served as a Member of the Catalan Parliament from 2006 to 2019 and Second Vice President of the Catalan Parliament from 2015 to 2019.

== Biography ==
He studied Law at the Autonomous University of Madrid and has a master's degree in insolvency administration obtained at the Lawyer Association of Barcelona, he also has some other minors obtained at ESADE. Before becoming a member of parliament he worked as a lawyer of La Caixa, being the head of the legal advice team.

He has been a member of the Citizens party ever since its establishment in 2006 and he is now in charge of the legal affairs of the Steering Committee. He was number seven in the list of the 2012 Catalan regional election and was elected member of parliament. He was re-elected in the 2015 and 2017 regional elections.

=== Congress of Deputies ===
Espejo-Saavedra left the Catalan Parliament in 2019 after being elected Member of the Congress of Deputies in the 2019 general election. On July 16, 2019, his party nominated him to be a member of the Congress' Permanent Deputation. On July 30, 2019, he assumed as chairman of the Congress of Deputies Committee on International Cooperation for Development.

==== Committee assignments ====
- Constitutional Committee
- Committee on Justice
- Committee on International Cooperation for Development – (chair)
- Committee on Rules
