= Gerard Gómez (politician) =

Spanish journalist and politician

Gerard Gómez MP

Member of the Congress of Deputies
- Incumbent
- Assumed office 20 May 2019
- Constituency: Barcelona

Member of the Parliament of Catalonia
- In office 26 October 2015 – 28 October 2017
- Constituency: Barcelona
- In office 17 January 2018 – 20 May 2019
- Succeeded by: José Rodríguez
- Constituency: Barcelona

Personal details
- Born: Gerard Gómez del Moral i Fuster; 17 October 1989 (age 36) Barcelona, Catalonia, Spain
- Party: Republican Left of Catalonia
- Other political affiliations: Republican Left of Catalonia–Sovereigntists
- Education: Autonomous University of Barcelona
- Occupation: Journalist

Gerard Gómez del Moral i Fuster (born 17 October 1989) is a Spanish journalist and politician from Catalonia who serves as Member of the Congress of Deputies of Spain. Previously, he has served as member of the Parliament of Catalonia.

== Early life ==
Gómez was born on 17 October 1989 in Barcelona, Catalonia. He has a degree in journalism from the Autonomous University of Barcelona.

== Career ==
Gómez is a journalist. He joined Young Republican Left of Catalonia (JERC) in 2004 and Republican Left of Catalonia (ERC) in 2007. He was JERC's Barcelona spokesperson from 2007 to 2011 and JERC's national spokesperson from 2011 to 2016. He is a member of Òmnium Cultural, has been associated with Coordinadora d'Associacions per la Llengua Catalana (CAL) and is an affiliate of Intersindical-CSC. He is also a member of FC Barcelona.

Gómez contested the 2015 regional election as a Junts pel Sí (JxSí) electoral alliance candidate in the Province of Barcelona and was elected to the Parliament of Catalonia. At the 2017 regional election Gómez was placed 19th on the Republican Left of Catalonia–Catalonia Yes (ERC–CatSí) alliance's list of candidates in Barcelona but the alliance only managed to win 18 seats in the province and as a result he failed to get re-elected. However, in January 2018 he was appointed to the Catalan Parliament after Carles Mundó, the number 5 candidate on ERC–CatSí's list for Barcelona, declined to take his seat in Parliament for personal reasons.

Gómez contested the 2019 general election as a Republican Left of Catalonia–Sovereigntists electoral alliance candidate in the Province of Barcelona and was elected to the Congress of Deputies.

== Electoral history ==
Electoral history of Gerard Gómez
Election	Constituency	Party	Alliance	No.	Result
2015 regional	Province of Barcelona	Republican Left of Catalonia	Junts pel Sí	31	Elected
2017 regional	Province of Barcelona	Republican Left of Catalonia	Republican Left of Catalonia–Catalonia Yes	19	Elected
2019 general	Province of Barcelona	Republican Left of Catalonia	Republican Left of Catalonia–Sovereigntists	6	Elected
