= Jordi Turull =

Spanish politician (born 1966)

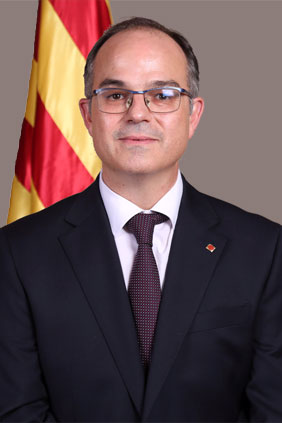
- Official portrait, 2017

Minister of the Presidency of Catalonia
- In office 14 July 2017 – 27 October 2017
- President: Carles Puigdemont
- Preceded by: Neus Munté
- Succeeded by: Elsa Artadi (Direct rule until 2 June 2018)

Government Spokesperson of Catalonia
- In office 14 July 2017 – 27 October 2017
- President: Carles Puigdemont
- Preceded by: Neus Munté
- Succeeded by: Elsa Artadi (Direct rule until 2 June 2018)

Member of the Congress of Deputies
- In office 21 May 2019 – 24 May 2019 (suspended)
- Constituency: Barcelona

Member of Parliament of Catalonia for the Province of Barcelona
- In office 2 April 2004 – 18 May 2019 (suspended since 10 July 2018)

Personal details
- Born: Jordi Turull i Negre; 6 September 1966 (age 60) Parets del Vallès, Catalonia, Spain
- Party: Together for Catalonia (since 2020)
- Other political affiliations: PDeCAT (2016–2020); CDC (1987–2016); Nationalist Youth of Catalonia (1983–1987)
- Education: Autonomous University of Barcelona
- Occupation: Politician

Jordi Turull i Negre (born 6 September 1966) is a Spanish politician from Catalonia associated with Together for Catalonia. Since March 2018 he has been in pre-trial custody by order of the Supreme Court of Spain and accused of sedition and rebellion. On 10 July 2018 a Supreme Court judge suspended him as a deputy in the Catalan parliament.

== Life and career ==
Turull was born in Parets del Vallès, Spain. With a degree in law, he joined the Nationalist Youth of Catalonia in 1983 and Convergència Democràtica (CDC) in 1987. He was a councilor in the City Council of Parets del Vallès in 1987–2003, and headed the Convergència i Unió (CiU) list in the municipal elections of 1991, 1995 and 1999. He was a member of the Diputació de Barcelona in 1991–1996 and general director of the Catalan Institute of Volunteering between 1996 and 2000. He was the Regional President of CDC del Vallès Oriental in 2000–2004 and president of the CDC regional federation of Barcelona. He has also been an associate professor at the Autonomous University of Barcelona.

Deputy in the Catalan Parliament since 2004, in 2010 he became spokesperson for the Convergència i Unió group in the Parliament of Catalonia and in March 2013 he was appointed as group president. He presided the research commission on the Fiscal Pact of the Parliament of Catalonia.

After the 2015 elections to the Parliament of Catalonia, he was elected president of the Junts pel Sí coalition. He held the position until 14 July 2017, when President Carles Puigdemont chose him as Councilor for Presidency and Government spokesman.

In the 2019 general election, Turull was elected member of the Congress of Deputies for the Province of Barcelona, being sworn in on 20 May 2019, but on 24 May, by a recommendation of the Supreme Court, the Board of the Congress suspended him and other imprisoned Catalan leaders. He also resigned as member of the Catalan Parliament on 18 May 2019.

He was pardoned and released, along with the other 8 jailed Catalonia independence leaders, in June 2021.

== Imprisonment ==
On 27 October 2017, after the Parliament of Catalonia proclaimed the Catalan Republic, the Spanish Senate approved the measures proposed by the Spanish executive pursuant to Article 155 of the Spanish Constitution of 1978, including the dismissal of the President of the Generalitat of Catalonia and the entire executive, including Jordi Turull.

On 2 November 2017, eight members of the Catalan Government, including Jordi Turull, Oriol Junqueras, Josep Rull, Meritxell Borràs, Carles Mundó, Raül Romeva, Dolors Bassa, Joaquim Forn and ex-minister Santi Vila, gave testimony before the Spanish Audiencia Nacional general court. The prosecutor, Miguel Ángel Carballo, requested unconditional jail for all members of the Catalan Government, including Jordi Turull, which was subsequently decreed by the magistrate, Carmen Lamela. On 4 December Turull was released on bail after his case passed to the Supreme Court.

On 21 December Turull was re-elected to the Parliament with the list of Together for Catalonia in new elections. After the failed attempts to propose Carles Puigdemont or Jordi Sànchez for the presidency, on 21 March 2018, Turull was proposed for president. The investiture took place on 22 March 2018, and the parliamentarians rejected Turull's candidacy for President of the Generalitat with 65 votes against, 64 in favor and 4 abstentions.

One day later, on 23 March 2018, the magistrate of the Spanish High Court, Tribunal Supremo, Pablo Llarena sent him back to prison, together with the former president of Parliament Carme Forcadell and the ministers Raül Romeva, Josep Rull and Dolors Bassa. Llarena argued for unconditional provisional bail after considering that was a risk of flight and reiteration of the crimes for which they were prosecuted. In July 2018, he was transferred to a prison in Catalonia. Between 1 and 21 December 2018, Turull and Jordi Sànchez started a hunger strike in order to 'raise awareness' of unfair treatment by Spain and to denounce that Spanish courts are refusing to process numerous appeals in relation to their cases.

On 1 February 2019 he was transferred back to a prison in Madrid, expecting trial that started on 12 February and ended and was remitted to decision on 12 June 2019.

On 14 October 2019 he was sentenced to a 12 years of prison term and disqualification for the sedition and misuse of public funds crimes. He was freed in June 2021 following a government pardon.

== Pardon ==
He was pardoned and released, along with the other 8 jailed Catalonia independence leaders, in June 2021. Prime Minister Pedro Sánchez said that he pardoned them because it was the best decision for Spain and Catalonia, but did not overturn their bans from holding public office.
