= Jorge Soler González =

Spanish doctor & politician (born 1975)

Jorge Soler
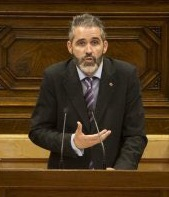
- Jorge Soler González speaking at the Parliament of Catalonia
- Parliamentary group: Ciudadanos (Citizens)
- Constituency: Barcelona

Personal details
- Education: University of Lleida
- Occupation: Politician

Jorge Soler González (born 1975 in Lérida) is a medical doctor, teacher, writer and Spanish politician. He is a deputy for Ciudadanos, elected to the Parliament of Catalonia for the 11th and 12th legislatures.

== Biography ==
Jorge Soler graduated in Medicine at the University of Lleida and received his doctorate in 2007 with the thesis «Inmigración en la ciudad de Lleida: estado de salud, incapacidades laborales, farmacia y utilización de los servicios sanitarios», later awarded by the Economic and Social Council of Spain and published as a book in 2008. He worked as a family doctor in the Primary Care Center of Rambla Ferran de Lleida between 2005 and 2015, and in parallel, between 2012 and 2015 he was vice dean of studies at the faculty of medicine of the University of Lleida. He has conducted research on social inequality, immigration, communication and empathy, and participated in research projects, doctoral theses and conferences. The year 2015 received the National Prize for University Work in Family Medicine granted by the Spanish Society of Family and Community Medicine.

On the other hand, he has published several popular science, novel and essay books, and more than sixty scientific articles. He was a member of the Editorial Board of the Official Journal of the College of Physicians of Lleida. Since 2015, it has published an opinion column in Segre called Vent de Ponent.

In 2015, after winning the primary elections, he was chosen as the head of the independent list of the electoral district of Lleida for the lists of Citizens for the elections in the Parliament of Catalonia in 2015. His proposal was based on the reactivation of the economy, the stimulation of social policies, the fight against corruption and the promotion of quality and trilingual education. The electoral result obtained in the elections, Ciudadanos got 25 parliamentary representatives, allowed him to be deputy of the XI legislature of the autonomous Catalonia. During that term he was the President of the Commission of the Statute of Deputies, spokesman for Citizens in the Health Commission and member of the Advisory Board of the Parliament on Science and Technology.

In the elections to the Parliament of Catalonia in 2017 he was elected deputy for Citizens by the electoral district of Lleida, being the most voted list with 36 deputies and getting 3 deputies in his province. He is a spokesperson in the Health Commission and member of the Permanent Deputation.

== Books ==
- Soler González, Jorge; Torrecillas, David; Rosich Rosich, Antoni. Fotografia digital en Atenció Primària. CAMFiC, 2007. ISBN 978-84-96684-01-0
- Soler González, Jorge. Inmigración en la ciudad de Lleida: estado de salud, incapacidades laborales, farmacia y utilización de los servicios sanitarios. Consejo Económico y Social (España), 2008. ISBN 9788481882971.
- Soler González, Jorge. ¿Por qué lloran los inmigrantes? Sentirse enfermo lejos de casa. Milenio, 2010. ISBN 9788497433334.
- Soler González, Jorge. El pájaro en el jardín. Milenio, 2014. ISBN 9788497436137.
- Soler González, Jorge; Raurich Leandro, Jordi. Comunicación y atención primaria para alumnos de Medicina. Universitat de Lleida, 2015. ISBN 9788484097365.
