= Lluís Puig =

Spanish politician

The Honourable Lluís Puig
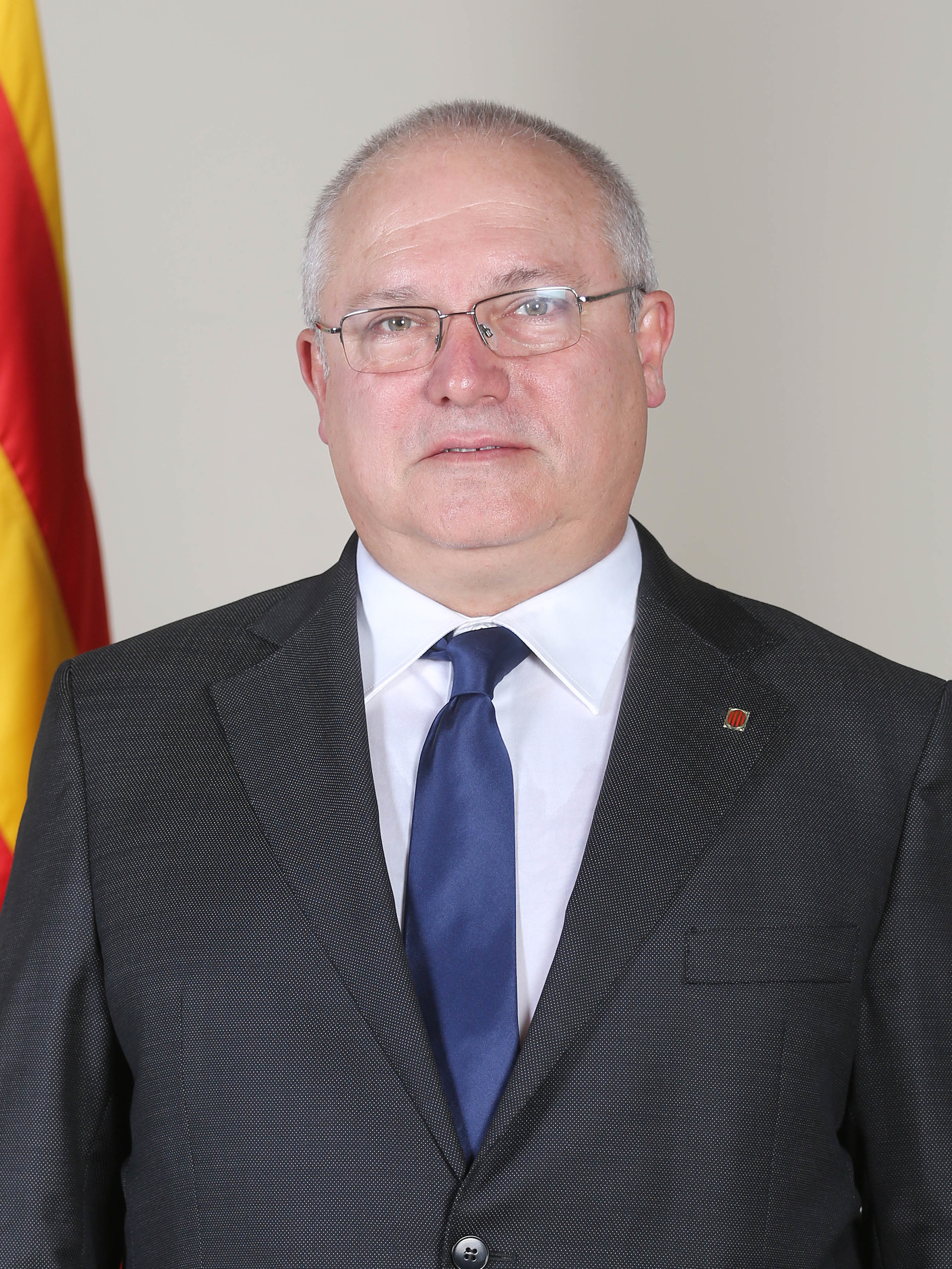

Minister of Culture of Catalonia
- In office 5 July 2017 – 28 October 2017
- President: Carles Puigdemont
- Preceded by: Santi Vila
- Succeeded by: Laura Borràs (Direct rule until 2 June 2018)

Personal details
- Born: Lluís Puig i Gordi; 18 October 1959 (age 66) Terrassa, Catalonia, Spain
- Citizenship: Spanish
- Party: Catalan European Democratic Party (2016-2020); Democratic Convergence of Catalonia (2011-2016)
- Education: Open University of Catalonia
- Profession: Art director

Lluís Puig i Gordi (Terrassa, 18 October 1959) is an art director, dancer, musician, folklorist and Spanish politician from Catalonia. He served as the Minister of Culture of Catalonia, the department responsible for libraries, language and heritage preservation, and historical commemorations. He succeeded Santi Vila on 5 July 2017.

== Biography ==
Born in Terrassa in 1959, he studied music, dance, audiovisual production, and humanities from the Open University of Catalonia. Immediately after completing his studies he devoted himself to the study, promotion and practice of Catalan traditions.

He has been a sardanist in the group Minyons d'en Serrat, Asert. He was also a dancer and director of several traditional dancing clubs from different cities: Terrassa, Catalunya Dansa, Igualada, Barcelona, and Rubí. Additionally, he was part of the folk group Ministrils del Raval, and founder of several cultural associations from Terrassa. In recognition of his efforts, the Government of Catalonia granted him the National Dance Award in 1984.

From 1998 to 2000 he served as head of resources at the Center for the Promotion of Popular and Traditional Catalan Culture. From 1999 to 2010 he was director of the Fira Mediterrania in Manresa. In 2001 he was a cofounder of the company VESC (Vèrtex Empresarial de Serveis Culturals, SL) dedicated to popularize Catalan songs, music and dance and other traditional Mediterranean cultures. In 2005 he promoted the project Casa de la Música in Terrassa, Salt, Mataró, l'Hospitalet de Llobregat, and Manresa. This project aimed to encourage the general public to study, create and play all kinds of live music.

Beginning in 2008, Puig served as director of the Mercat de Música Viva de Vic for three editions. During this period, he managed to invite popular groups and artists such as Mishima, Santiago Auserón, Roger Mas, Omar Sosa, La Gossa Sorda, At Versaris and Els Surfing Sirles.

During the first mandate of Artur Mas i Gavarro, Puig joined the political party Convergence and Union and, in 2011, assumed the position of general director of Popular Culture. He remained in that role until he was appointed Minister of Culture of Catalonia on 5 July 2017.

After the 2017 Catalan independence referendum, Spanish authorities brought criminal charges against several members of the Catalan government, including Puig. Along with other prosecuted Catalan politicians, he fled to Belgium at the end of 2017. In August 2020, a court in Brussels ruled that a European Arrest Warrant issued against Puig by Spanish authorities could not be executed.

== Bibliography ==
In addition to his career as cultural promoter, he has also written or cowritten several books about traditional culture, especially dance:

- Puig i Gordi, Lluís; Galí, Marc; Grau, Joan; Mata, Anna (1991). Terregada. Apunts sobre folklore de Terrassa. Tarragona: Edicions El Mèdol. ISBN 9788486542306. Amazon Iberlibro
- Puig i Gordi, Lluís (1994). Crònica i calendari de dansa tradicional. Tarragona: El Mèdol. ISBN 8486542995. OpenLibrary Institut del Teatre catalog
- Amades, Joan; Puig i Gordi, Lluís; Grau i Martí, Joan (1998). Danses de la Terra: música i dansa tradicional de les comarques de Barcelona (Biblioteca Joan Amades). Tarragona: El Mèdol. ISBN 8489936137. Dialnet OpenLibrary
- Puig i Gordi, Lluís (1998). Calendari de danses tradicionals catalanes. Tarragona: Edicions El Mèdol / Generalitat de Catalunya, Departament de Cultura. ISBN 843934676X. Soinuenea catalog LibraryThing
- Puig i Gordi, Lluís (1999). Les festes a Catalunya. Barcelona: Editorial 92. ISBN 8439349467. Universitat de Barcelona review Amazon

== See also ==
- Joan Amades
- Joaquim Forn
- Carles Puigdemont
