= Carme Forcadell =

Spanish politician

The Right Honourable Carme Forcadell
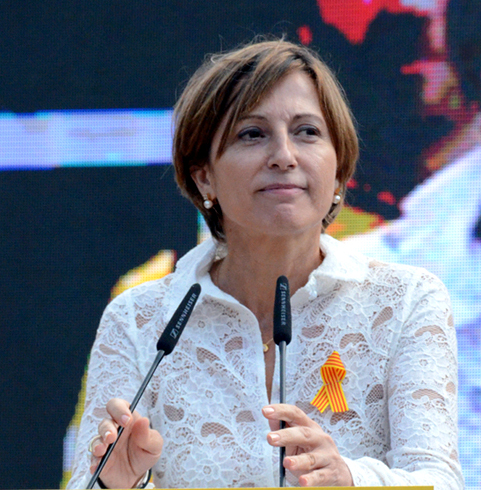
- Forcadell in 2013

14th President of the Parliament of Catalonia
- In office 26 October 2015 – 17 January 2018
- Vice President: Lluís Corominas (2015-2017); Lluís Guinó (2017)
- Preceded by: Núria de Gispert
- Succeeded by: Roger Torrent

President of the Catalan National Assembly
- In office 22 April 2012 – 6 May 2015
- Succeeded by: Jordi Sànchez

Member of the Parliament of Catalonia for the Province of Barcelona
- In office 26 October 2015 – 22 March 2018

City Councilor of Sabadell
- In office 2003–2007

Personal details
- Born: 29 May 1955 (age 71) Xerta, Catalonia, Spain
- Party: Independent; Junts pel Sí (2015–2017); Republican Left of Catalonia (2003–2007)
- Children: 2
- Education: Philosophy
- Alma mater: Autonomous University of Barcelona
- Occupation: Teacher, writer, politician
- Profession: Language teacher

Maria Carme Forcadell i Lluís (Western Catalan pronunciation: [ˈkaɾme foɾkaˈðeʎ]; born 29 May 1955) is a Spanish politician from Catalonia. She is the former President of the Parliament of Catalonia, as well as a Catalan high school teacher, known for her Catalan independence activism.

She was one of the founders of Plataforma per la Llengua, a member of the executive board of the Sabadell branch of Òmnium Cultural, and president of the Catalan National Assembly from its inception until May 2015.

In 2015, she won a seat in the Catalan parliament as part of the Junts pel Sí coalition. Subsequently, in October 2015 she was elected President of the Parliament of Catalonia, a position she held until January 2018. Since March 2018 until June 2021, she was jailed, accused of rebellion. In October 2019, she was sentenced by Spain's Supreme Court to 11 years and six months in prison and disqualification for the crimes of sedition and embezzlement of public funds. She was freed in June 2021 following a government pardon.

== Background ==
Forcadell was born in Xerta. She is the daughter of a humble family; her father was a farmer and a truck driver. She was born in Xerta and at 18 she moved to Sabadell, where she currently lives.

Forcadell has a degree in philosophy and communication studies from the Autonomous University of Barcelona and a Masters in Catalan philology from the same university. She worked at the television station TVE Catalunya from 1979 to 1982 and with various other media organizations. Forcadell has been a civil servant within the Catalan Department of Education since 1985, as the coordinator of linguistic normalization for the Department's Catalan Education Service since 1992, and then from 2004 on as a consultant of intercultural studies, language, and social cohesion in Vallès Occidental. She has published textbooks, books on language and literature, and a dictionary. She has been a contributing writer for various media outlets, writing about language planning, language, and identity. She is a member of the Comissió de la Dignitat (Commission on Dignity, an organization that works to have documents confiscated by the Franco regime returned to their rightful owners) and the Plataforma pel Dret de Decidir (Platform for the Right to Decide), where she is part of the communications committee.

== Political career ==
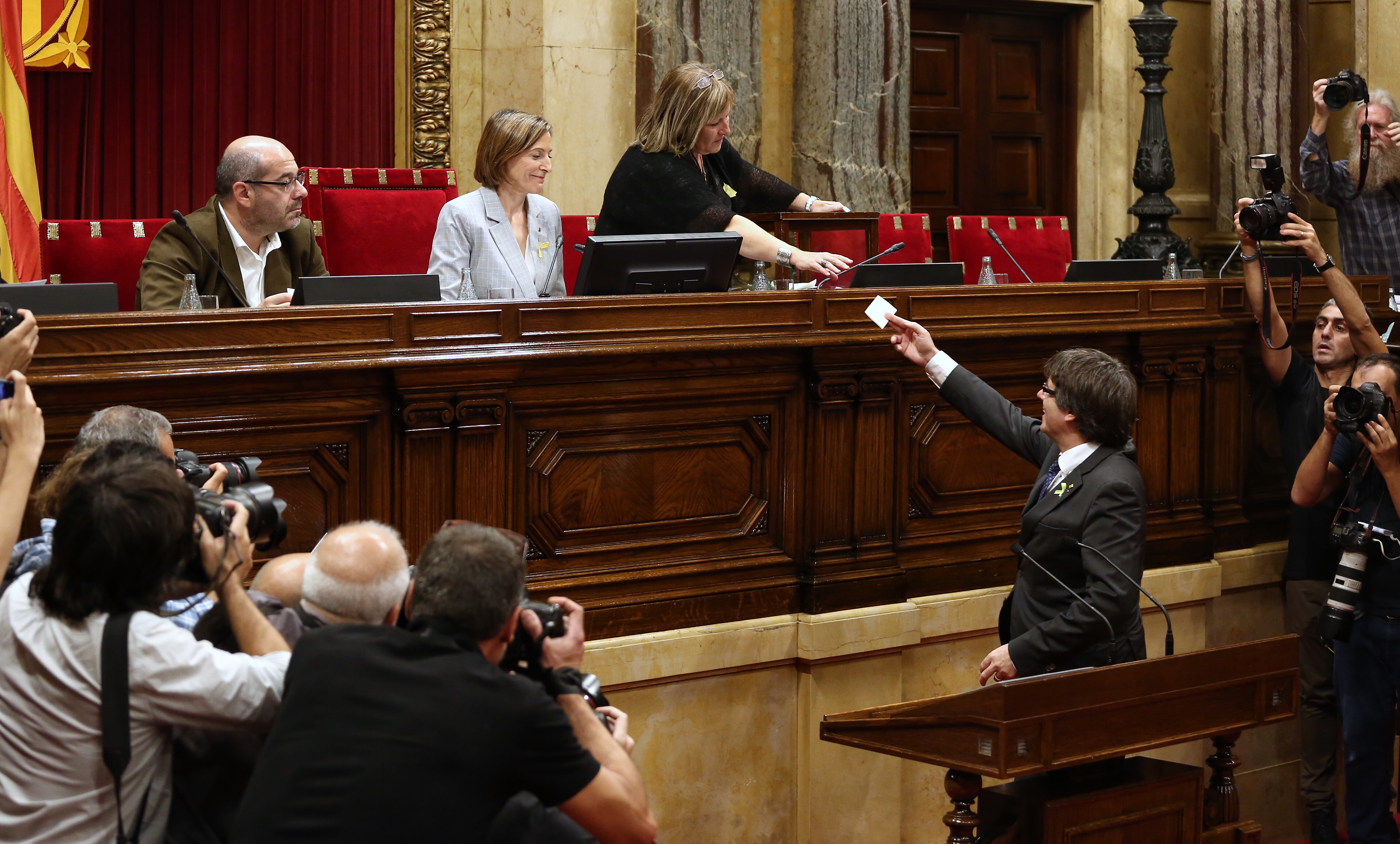
Puigdemont voting for Declaration of Independence on 27 October 2017

Forcadell has been a member of Esquerra Republicana de Catalunya and served as a city councilperson for the political party in Sabadell from 2003 to 2007.

On 22 April 2012 the members of the executive board of the Catalan National Assembly (ANC) chose Forcadell as president of the ANC. She was joined by Carles Castellanos as vice president and Jordi Martínez as secretary. During the summer of 2012, the ANC organized marches for independence all over Catalonia. As president of the ANC, Forcadell was one of the leading voices behind the organization of the 2012 "Catalonia, Next State in Europe" rallies and the Catalan Way in 2013. On 17 May 2014, she was reelected president of the ANC with 97% of the votes. Forcadell received the 2014 Joan Blanca Prize from the city of Perpignan in recognition of her commitment to the defense of Catalan culture and identity.

On 16 May 2015, Jordi Sànchez i Picanyol succeeded her as President of the ANC. He was chosen by the members of the executive board despite Liz Castro's having received the most votes. The following July it was announced that Forcadell would be a candidate in the Catalan parliamentary elections to be held on 27 September, running second behind Raül Romeva on the electoral list of the pro-independence coalition Together for Yes for the province of Barcelona.

On 26 October 2015 Forcadell was elected president of the Catalan parliament.

=== Imprisonment ===
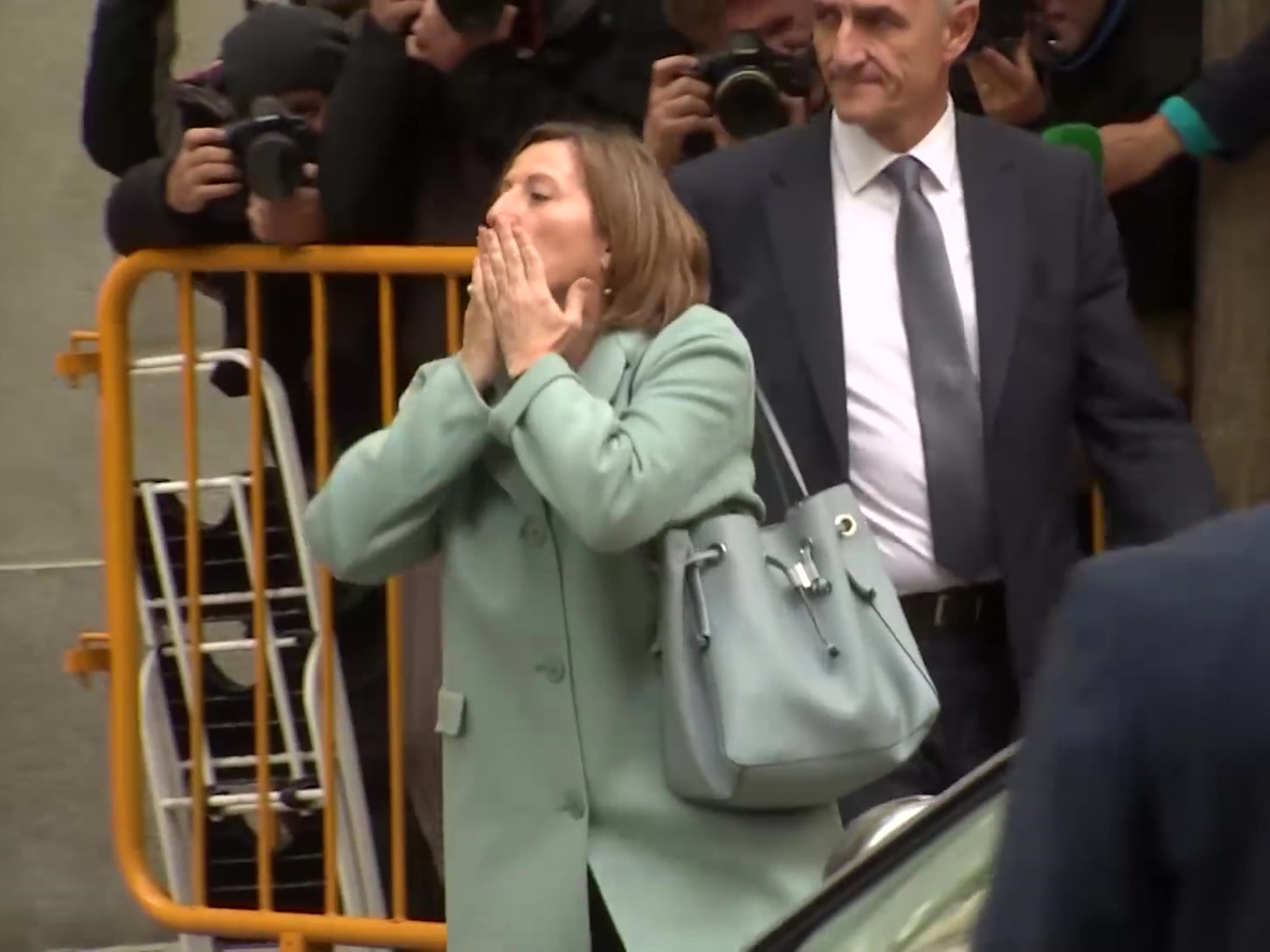
Forcadell attending to the Supreme Court on 2 November 2017

After the Catalan declaration of independence on 27 October 2017, Forcadell was investigated by the Supreme Court for alleged crimes of rebellion and sedition.

She first appeared in the Supreme Court on 2 November 2017 but the judge postponed her declaration as imputed for 9 November.

On 9 November 2017 Forcadell was sent to Madrid's Alcalá Meco jail, only overnight, over her role as the Speaker of the Catalan Parliament for having processed in the Parliament a bill of independence referendum, using an emergency procedure that was declared void by the Constitutional Court, violating the participation rights of the opposition parties and falsifying the publication of said project, because the secretary general of the parliament refused to process it, as it was unconstitutional. Also, to process the next day the Draft Law of legal transience, which sought to unilaterally break the unity of Spain. She was released the same day with a precautionary bail of 150,000 euros.

In December of the same year she was again elected to the Parliament elections this time for the candidature of Esquerra Republicana. She renewed her status as a parliamentarian on 17 January 2018 but resigned to be re-elected president of the chamber and was succeeded by the deputy by Roger Torrent.

On 24 March 2018, after the failed voting for the investiture of Jordi Turull as president of the Generalitat of Catalonia, she resigned as deputy, along with Marta Rovira and Dolors Bassa. One day after, on 23 March 2018, Presidential candidate Jordi Turull, former parliament speaker Carme Forcadell and three deposed ministers were sent to pre-trial prison.

On 1 February 2019 she was transferred back to the Madrilenian prison of Alcalá-Meco, to face the Judgment that began on 12 February 2019 and ended and was remitted to decision on 12 June 2019.

On 14 October 2019, she was sentenced to 11 years and six months in prison and disqualification for sedition crime. The verdict was delivered by seven judges at Spain's supreme court, after a four-month trial with 422 witnesses.

She was freed in June 2021 following a government pardon, together with other eight politicians imprisoned in connection with the Catalan independence referendum.
