= 14th Parliament of Catalonia =

Parliament Meeting

←	12th	15th	→
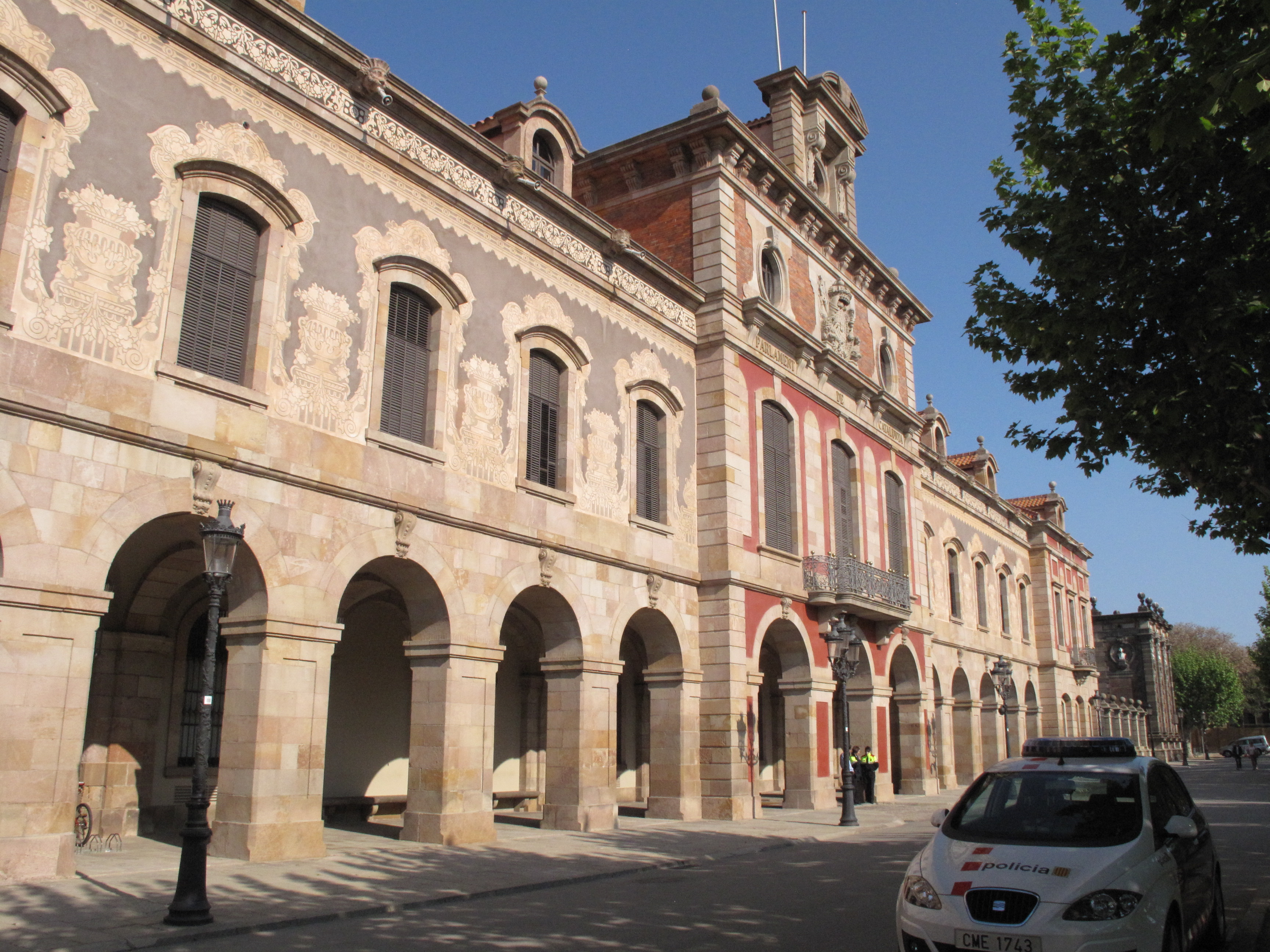

Overview
- Legislative body: Parliament of Catalonia
- Term: 12 March 2021 – 19 March 2024
- Election: 14 February 2021
- Government: Aragonès
- Website: www.parlament.cat

Deputies
- Members: 135
- President: Laura Borràs (JxCat, until 28 July 2022); Alba Vergés (ERC, acting 28 July 2022 to 9 June 2023); Anna Erra (JxCat, since 9 June 2023)
- First Vice President: Anna Caula (ERC, until 15 June 2021); Alba Vergés (ERC, since 16 June 2021)
- Second Vice President: Eva Granados (PSC, until 5 October 2021); Assumpta Escarp (PSC, since 5 October 2021)
- First Secretary: Ferran Pedret (PSC)
- Second Secretary: Jaume Alonso-Cuevillas (JxCat, until 7 April 2021); Aurora Madaula (JxCat, since 19 April 2021)
- Third Secretary: Pau Juvillà (CUP-G, until 28 January 2022); Carles Riera (CUP-G, since 22 February 2022)

The 14th Parliament of Catalonia, before 4 June 2021 known as the 13th Parliament of Catalonia, was the meeting of the Parliament of Catalonia, with the membership determined by the results of the regional election held on 14 February 2021. The congress met for the first time on 12 March 2021 and was dissolved on 19 March 2024 due to the snap election that Pere Aragonès announced would take place on 12 May 2024.

It is the thirteenth meeting of the Parliament of Catalonia since the falling of Franco's regime, however, during this session the numbering was changed in order to consider as the first meeting the one from the regional parliament established as a result of the 1932 Statue of Autonomy, whose duration was interrupted by the Spanish Civil War. Effectively, that meant that officially the 13th Parliament is skipped, as the decision didn't alter the numbering of the previous meetings.

== Election ==
The 14th Catalan regional election was held on 14 February 2021. At the election the Socialists' Party of Catalonia (PSC-PSOE) and Republican Left of Catalonia (ERC) became the largest party in the parliament with 33 seats each. In a close second place, Together for Catalonia (JxCat) won 32 seats. The parties supporting the independence of Catalonia won an overall majority, and for the first time, they got over 50% of the votes (if included those without representation).

Alliance	Votes	%	Seats	+/-
Socialists' Party of Catalonia (PSC–PSOE)	654,766	23.0%	33	▲16
Republican Left of Catalonia (ERC)	605,581	21.3%	33	▲1
Together for Catalonia (JxCat)	570,539	20.1%	32	▲12
Vox (Vox)	218,121	7.7%	11	▲11
Popular Unity Candidacy (CUP)	189,924	6.7%	9	▲5
In Common We Can−We Can In Common (ECP-PEC)	195,345	6.9%	8	Steady
Citizens (Cs)	158,606	5.6%	6	▼30
People's Party of Catalonia (PP)	109,452	3.8%	3	▼1
Catalan European Democratic Party (PDeCAT)	77,229	2.7%	0	▼14
Others/blanks	63,851	1.4%	0	
Total	2,884,845	100.00%	135	Steady

== History ==
The new parliament met for the first time on 12 March 2021 and after two rounds, Laura Borràs (JxCat) was elected as President of the Parliament of Catalonia with the support of ERC.

President
Candidate		Votes	
Candidate		Round 1	Round 2
Laura Borràs	JxCat	65	64
Eva Granados	PSC-PSOE	42	50
María Elisa García	Vox	11	Eliminated
Joan Carles Gallego	ECP-PEC	8	Eliminated
Blank		8	18
Null		0	2
Total		134 (Note: Lluís Puig (JxCat) couldn't assist the session and he wasn't allowed to vote from home.)	134

== Members ==
Name	Constituency	No.	Party	Alliance	Group	Took office	Left office	Notes
Jeannine Abella	Lleida	6	JxCat	JxCat	Together for Catalonia	25 January 2022		Replaces Carles Garcia.
Manuel Jesús Acosta	Barcelona	7	Vox	Vox	Vox	12 March 2021		
Jordi Albert	Barcelona	15	ERC	ERC	Republican	12 March 2021		
Jéssica Albiach	Barcelona	1	Podemos	ECP-PEC	En Comú Podem	12 March 2021		
Pere Albó	Girona	8	MES	JxCat	Together for Catalonia	6 August 2021		Replaces Gemma Geis.
Judit Alcalá	Lleida	2	PSC	PSC	Socialists	12 March 2021		
Jaume Alonso-Cuevillas	Barcelona	5	JxCat	JxCat	Together for Catalonia	12 March 2021		
Matías Alonso	Tarragona	6	Cs	Cs	Citizens	12 March 2021		
Oscar Aparicio	Girona	2	PSC	PSC	Socialists	12 March 2021		
Irene Aragonès	Tarragona	3	ERC	ERC	Republican	12 March 2021		
Pere Aragonès	Barcelona	1	ERC	ERC	Republican	12 March 2021		
Elsa Artadi	Barcelona	4	JxCat	JxCat	Together for Catalonia	12 March 2021	10 May 2022	Replaced by Judit Guàrdia.
Ana María Balsera	Barcelona	18	ERC	ERC	Republican	12 March 2021		
Albert Batet	Tarragona	1	JxCat	JxCat	Together for Catalonia	12 March 2021		
María Antonia Batlle	Girona	5	JxCat	JxCat	Together for Catalonia	12 March 2021		
Helena Bayo	Barcelona	22	PSC	PSC	Socialists	12 March 2021		
Andrés Félix Bello	Barcelona	6	Vox	Vox	Vox	12 March 2021		
Laura Borràs	Barcelona	2	JxCat	JxCat	Together for Catalonia	12 March 2021		
Marina Bravo	Barcelona	4	Cs	Cs	Citizens	12 March 2021		
Meritxell Budó	Barcelona	6	JxCat	JxCat	Together for Catalonia	12 March 2021	10 June 2021	Replaced by David Saldoni.
Jaume Butinyà	Girona	8	ERC	ERC	Republican	28 July 2021		Replaces Teresa Jordà
Francesc Damià Calvet	Barcelona	11	JxCat	JxCat	Together for Catalonia	12 March 2021	6 July 2021	Replaced by Lourdes Ciuró.
Eusebi Campdepadrós	Tarragona	3	JxCat	JxCat	Together for Catalonia	12 March 2021	10 June 2021	Replaced by Joaquim Catalayud.
Alba Camps	Barcelona	20	ERC	ERC	Republican	12 March 2021	15 June 2021	Replaces Ester Capella.
Joan Canadell	Barcelona	3	JxCat	JxCat	Together for Catalonia	12 March 2021		
Eva Candela	Barcelona	18	PSC	PSC	Socialists	12 March 2021		
Ester Capella	Barcelona	8	ERC	ERC	Republican	12 March 2021	15 June 2021	Replaced by Alba Camps.
Dolors Carreras	Tarragona	4	PSC	PSC	Socialists	12 March 2021		
Carlos Carrizosa	Barcelona	1	Cs	Cs	Citizens	12 March 2021		
Cristina Casol	Lleida	2	JxCat	JxCat	Together for Catalonia	12 March 2021		
Carles Castillo	Tarragona	4	Independent	ERC	Republican	12 March 2021		
Joaquim Catalayud	Tarragona	5	JxCat	JxCat	Together for Catalonia	16 June 2021		Replaces Eusebi Campdepadrós.
Anna Caula	Girona	3	ERC	ERC	Republican	12 March 2021		
Basharat Changue	Barcelona	5	CUP	CUP-G	CUP	12 March 2021		
David Cid	Barcelona	5	CatComú	ECP-PEC	En Comú Podem	12 March 2021		
Lourdes Ciuró	Barcelona	20	JxCat	JxCat	Together for Catalonia	20 July 2021	30 July 2021	Replaces Francesc Damià Calvet. Replaced by Josep Riera.
Bartomeu Compte	Girona	4	ERC	ERC	Republican	12 March 2021		
Dani Cornellà	Girona	1	CUP	CUP-G	CUP	12 March 2021		
Francesc de Dalmases	Barcelona	15	JxCat	JxCat	Together for Catalonia	12 March 2021		
Elena Díaz	Barcelona	20	PSC	PSC	Socialists	12 March 2021		
Jenn Díaz	Barcelona	10	Independent	ERC	Republican	12 March 2021		
Mireia Dionisio	Barcelona	24	PSC	PSC	Socialists	13 October 2021		Replaces Eva Granados.
Najat Driouech	Barcelona	4	ERC	ERC	Republican	12 March 2021		
Chakir El Homrani	Barcelona	9	ERC	ERC	Republican	12 March 2021		
Anna María Erra	Barcelona	8	JxCat	JxCat	Together for Catalonia	12 March 2021		
Assumpta Escarp	Barcelona	8	PSC	PSC	Socialists	12 March 2021		
Ramon Espadaler	Barcelona	3	Units	PSC	Socialists	12 March 2021		
Mercè Esteve	Barcelona	12	JxCat	JxCat	Together for Catalonia	12 March 2021		
Laia Estrada	Tarragona	1	CUP	CUP-G	CUP	12 March 2021		
Ferran Estruch	Barcelona	19	ERC	ERC	Republican	12 March 2021		
Jordi Fàbrega	Lleida	3	JxCat	JxCat	Together for Catalonia	12 March 2021		
Anna Feliu	Lleida	4	JxCat	JxCat	Together for Catalonia	12 March 2021		
Alejandro Fernández	Barcelona	1	PPC	PP	People's	12 March 2021		
Juli Fernández	Barcelona	17	ERC	ERC	Republican	12 March 2021		
Antoni Flores Ardiaca	Lleida	4	ERC	ERC	Republican	12 March 2021	22 May 2023	
Montserrat Fornells	Lleida	5	ERC	ERC	Republican	12 March 2021		
Jordina Freixanet	Lleida	3	ERC	ERC	Republican	12 March 2021		
Antonio Gallego	Barcelona	2	Vox	Vox	Vox	12 March 2021		
Joan Carles Gallego	Barcelona	2	CatComú	ECP-PEC	En Comú Podem	12 March 2021		
Joan García	Barcelona	5	Cs	Cs	Citizens	12 March 2021		
Joan Carles Garcia	Lleida	5	JxCat	JxCat	Together for Catalonia	12 March 2021	18 January 2022	Replaced by Jeannine Abella.
María Elisa García	Barcelona	4	Vox	Vox	Vox	12 March 2021		
Mario García	Barcelona	23	PSC	PSC	Socialists	12 March 2021		
Rocío García	Barcelona	16	PSC	PSC	Socialists	12 March 2021		
Ignacio Garriga	Barcelona	1	Vox	Vox	Vox	12 March 2021		
Juan de la Cruz Garriga	Barcelona	3	Vox	Vox	Vox	12 March 2021		
Gemma Geis	Girona	1	JxCat	JxCat	Together for Catalonia	12 March 2021	30 July 2021	Replaced by Pere Albó.
Pol Gibert	Barcelona	9	PSC	PSC	Socialists	12 March 2021		
Cristòfol Gimeno	Barcelona	17	PSC	PSC	Socialists	12 March 2021		
David González	Barcelona	21	PSC	PSC	Socialists	12 March 2021		
Jessica González	Barcelona	3	CatComú	ECP-PEC	En Comú Podem	12 March 2021		
Judit Guàrdia	Barcelona	23	JxCat	JxCat	Together for Catalonia	15 May 2022		Replaces Elsa Artadi.
Eva Granados	Barcelona	2	PSC	PSC	Socialists	12 March 2021	5 October 2021	Replaced by Mireia Dionisio.
Ana María Grau	Barcelona	2	Cs	Cs	Citizens	12 March 2021		
Rosa M. Ibarra	Tarragona	1	PSC	PSC	Socialists	12 March 2021		
Salvador Illa	Barcelona	1	PSC	PSC	Socialists	12 March 2021		
Teresa Jordà	Girona	1	ERC	ERC	Republican	12 March 2021	23 July 2021	Replaced by Jaume Butinyà
Jordi Jordan	Tarragona	1	CatComú	ECP-PEC	En Comú Podem	12 March 2021		
Josep Maria Jové	Barcelona	5	ERC	ERC	Republican	12 March 2021		
Joaquim Jurbert	Barcelona	23	JxCat	JxCat	Together for Catalonia	22 March 2021		Replaces Josep Riera.
Assumpció Laïlla	Barcelona	16	DC	JxCat	Together for Catalonia	12 March 2021		
Isabel Lázaro	Tarragona	1	Vox	Vox	Vox	12 March 2021		
Gemma Lienas	Barcelona	4	PSC	PSC	Socialists	12 March 2021		
Ángeles Llive	Barcelona	22	ERC	ERC	Republican	28 July 2021		Replaces Laura Vilagrà.
Lluïsa Llop	Barcelona	16	ERC	ERC	Republican	12 March 2021		
Pau Juvillà	Lleida	1	CUP	CUP-G	CUP	12 March 2021		
Antonio Ramón López	Lleida	1	Vox	Vox	Vox	12 March 2021		
Mónica Lora	Barcelona	5	Vox	Vox	Vox	12 March 2021		
Sergio Macián	Tarragona	2	Vox	Vox	Vox	12 March 2021		
Aurora Madaula	Barcelona	10	AxR	JxCat	Together for Catalonia	12 March 2021		
Marta Madrenas	Girona	2	JxCat	JxCat	Together for Catalonia	12 March 2021		
Ernest Maragall	Barcelona	7	ERC	ERC	Republican	12 March 2021		
Ignacio de Loyola Martín	Barcelona	3	Cs	Cs	Citizens	12 March 2021		
Pau Morales	Barcelona	11	ERC	ERC	Republican	12 March 2021		
Raúl Moreno	Barcelona	11	PSC	PSC	Socialists	12 March 2021		
Marta Moreta	Barcelona	14	PSC	PSC	Socialists	12 March 2021		
Jordi Munell	Girona	7	JxCat	JxCat	Together for Catalonia	12 March 2021		
Irene Negre	Tarragona	6	JxCat	JxCat	Together for Catalonia	29 June 2021		Replaces Maria Teresa Pallarès.
Esther Niubó	Barcelona	10	PSC	PSC	Socialists	12 March 2021		
Òscar Ordeig	Lleida	1	PSC	PSC	Socialists	12 March 2021		
Jordi Orobitg	Girona	6	ERC	ERC	Republican	15 June 2021		Replaces Alba Vergès.
Mònica Palacín	Barcelona	14	ERC	ERC	Republican	12 March 2021		
Joaquim Paladella	Tarragona	3	PSC	PSC	Socialists	12 March 2021		
Maria Teresa Pallarès	Tarragona	4	JxCat	JxCat	Together for Catalonia	12 March 2021	18 June 2021	Replaced by Irene Negre.
Silvia Paneque	Girona	11	PSC	PSC	Socialists	12 March 2021		
Eva Parera	Barcelona	3	Valents	PP	People's	12 March 2021	22 February 2022	Replaced by Daniel Serrano.
Marc Parés	Barcelona	7	CatComú	ECP-PEC	En Comú Podem	12 March 2021		
Ferran Pedret	Barcelona	5	PSC	PSC	Socialists	12 March 2021		
Xavier Pellicer	Barcelona	4	CUP	CUP-G	CUP	12 March 2021		
David Pérez	Barcelona	7	PSC	PSC	Socialists	12 March 2021		
Núria Picas	Barcelona	12	Independent	ERC	Republican	12 March 2021	18 January 2022	Replaced by José Rodríguez.
Lluís Puig	Barcelona	9	JxCat	JxCat	Together for Catalonia	12 March 2021		
Carles Puigdemont	Barcelona	1	JxCat	JxCat	Together for Catalonia	12 March 2021		
Jordi Puigneró	Barcelona	7	JxCat	JxCat	Together for Catalonia	12 March 2021	30 July 2021	Replaced by Ester Vallès.
Eùlalia Reguant	Barcelona	3	CUP	CUP-G	CUP	12 March 2021		
Jordi Riba	Barcelona	19	PSC	PSC	Socialists	12 March 2021		
Carles Riera	Barcelona	2	CUP	CUP-G	CUP	12 March 2021		
Josep Riera	Barcelona	21	JxCat	JxCat	Together for Catalonia	6 August 2021	15 March 2022	Replaces Lourdes Ciuró. Replaced by Joaquim Jurbert.
Mónica Ríos	Girona	3	PSC	PSC	Socialists	12 March 2021		
Josep Rius	Barcelona	13	JxCat	JxCat	Together for Catalonia	12 March 2021		
José Rodríguez	Barcelona	23	Independent	ERC	Republican	25 January 2022		Replaces Núri Picas.
Lorena Roldán	Barcelona	2	Independent	PP	People's	12 March 2021		
Alícia Romero	Barcelona	6	PSC	PSC	Socialists	12 March 2021		
Silvia Romero	Lleida	3	PSC	PSC	Socialists	12 March 2021		
Ferran Roquer	Girona	6	JxCat	JxCat	Together for Catalonia	12 March 2021	18 February 2022	Replaced by Maite Selva.
Juan Luis Ruiz	Barcelona	15	PSC	PSC	Socialists	12 March 2021		
Dolors Sabater	Barcelona	1	G	CUP-G	CUP	12 March 2021		
Sergi Sabrià	Girona	2	ERC	ERC	Republican	12 March 2021	15 June 2021	Replaced by Anna Torrentà.
David Saldoni	Barcelona	19	JxCat	JxCat	Together for Catalonia	15 June 2021		Replaces Meritxell Budó.
Mònica Sales	Tarragona	2	JxCat	JxCat	Together for Catalonia	12 March 2021		
Lluís Salvadó	Tarragona	2	ERC	ERC	Republican	12 March 2021		
Raquel Sans	Tarragona	1	ERC	ERC	Republican	12 March 2021		
Susanna Segovia	Barcelona	6	CatComú	ECP-PEC	En Comú Podem	12 March 2021		
Mite Selva	Girona	9	JxCat	JxCat	Together for Catalonia	2 March 2022		Replaces Ferran Roquer.
Daniel Serrano	Barcelona	4	PPC	PP	People's	8 March 2022		Replaces Eva Parera.
Meritxell Serret	Lleida	2	ERC	ERC	Republican	12 March 2021		
Beatriz Silva	Barcelona	12	Independent	PSC	Socialists	12 March 2021		
Lucas Silvano	Barcelona	4	Podemos	ECP-PEC	En Comú Podem	12 March 2021		
Alberto Tarradas	Girona	1	Vox	Vox	Vox	12 March 2021		
Francesc Xavier Ten	Girona	4	JxCat	JxCat	Together for Catalonia	12 March 2021		
Jordi Terrades	Barcelona	13	PSC	PSC	Socialists	12 March 2021		
Judith Toronjo	Barcelona	14	JxCat	JxCat	Together for Catalonia	12 March 2021		
Roger Torrent	Barcelona	3	ERC	ERC	Republican	12 March 2021	23 July 2021	Replaced by Eugeni Villabí.
Anna Torrentà	Girona	7	ERC	ERC	Republican	15 June 2021		Replaces Sergi Sabrià.
Ramon Tremosa	Lleida	1	Independent	JxCat	Together for Catalonia	12 March 2021		
Ester Vallès	Barcelona	22	JxCat	JxCat	Together for Catalonia	6 August 2021		Replaces Jordi Puigneró.
Alba Vergés	Barcelona	6	ERC	ERC	Republican	12 March 2021	17 June 2021	Replaced by Jordi Orobitg.
Salvador Vergés	Girona	3	JxCat	JxCat	Together for Catalonia	12 March 2021		
Laura Vilagrà	Barcelona	2	ERC	ERC	Republican	12 March 2021	23 July 2021	Replaced by Ángeles Llive.
Marta Vilalta	Lleida	1	ERC	ERC	Republican	12 March 2021		
Eugeni Villabí	Barcelona	21	ERC	ERC	Republican	28 July 2021		Replaces Roger Torrent.
María Jesús Viña	Tarragona	5	ERC	ERC	Republican	12 March 2021		
Rubén Viñuales	Tarragona	2	PSC	PSC	Socialists	12 March 2021		Run as an independent but later joined PSC.
Montserrat Vinyets	Girona	2	CUP	CUP-G	CUP	12 March 2021		
Ruben Wagensberg	Barcelona	13	Independent	ERC	Republican	12 March 2021		
