= 15th Parliament of Catalonia =

←	14th	16th	→

Overview
- Legislative body: Parliament of Catalonia
- Meeting place: Palau del Parlament de Catalunya
- Term: 10 June 2024 –
- Election: 12 May 2024
- Government: Salvador Illa
- Website: parlament.cat

Parliamentarians
- Members: 135
- President: Salvador Illa (PSC)
- First Vice-President: Raquel Sans (ERC)
- Second Vice-President: David Pérez Ibáñez (PSC)
- First Secretary: Glòria Freixa (Junts)
- Second Secretary: Juli Fernàndez Olivares (ERC)
- Third Secretary: Rosa Maria Ibarra (PSC)
- Fourth Secretary: Judit Alcalá González (PSC)

The 15th Parliament of Catalonia is the 15th session of the Parliament of Catalonia, whose members were elected during the 2024 regional elections.
