= Ardiaca =

Ardiaca is a surname of Catalan origin.

- Antoni Flores Ardiaca (1963–2023), Spanish Catalan politician
- Pere Ardiaca (1909–1986), Spanish Catalan politician

== See also ==
- Ardiaei
