= Ferran Pedret =

Spanish politician (born 1979)

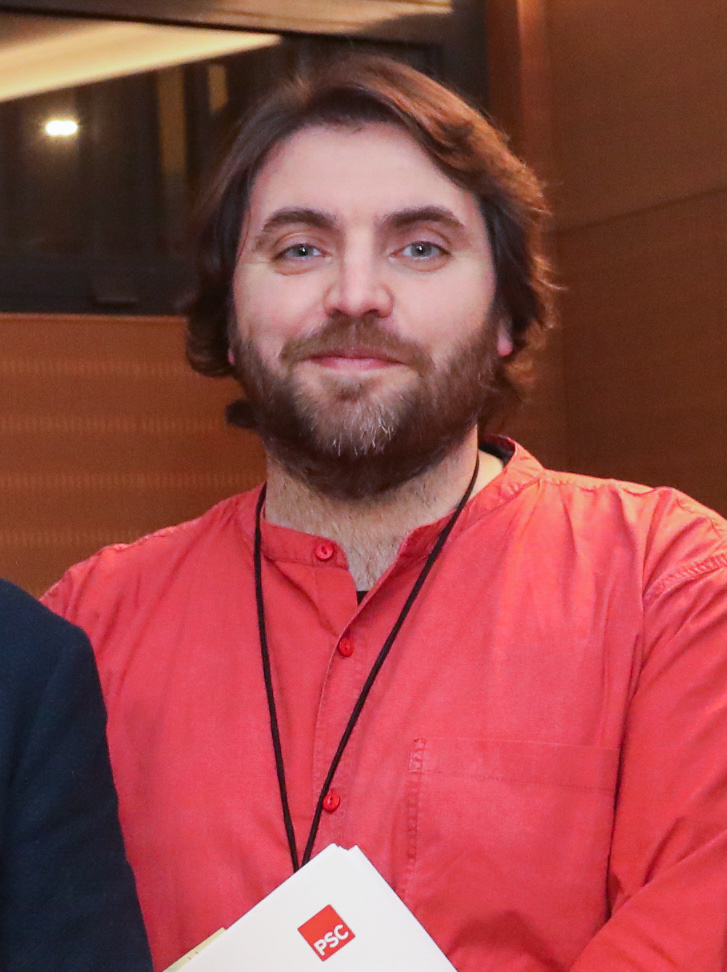
- Pedret in 2020

First Secretary of the Parliament of Catalonia
- In office 12 March 2021 – 10 June 2024
- President: Laura Borràs
- Preceded by: Eusebi Campdepadrós
- Succeeded by: Glòria Freixa

Member of the Parliament of Catalonia
- Incumbent
- Assumed office 17 December 2012
- Constituency: Barcelona

Personal details
- Born: 18 August 1979 (age 46)
- Party: Socialists' Party of Catalonia (since 1997)
- Parents: Jordi Pedret (father); Lídia Santos Arnau (mother)

Ferran Pedret i Santos (born 18 August 1979) is a Spanish politician serving as a member of the Parliament of Catalonia since 2012. He has served as group leader of the Socialists' Party of Catalonia since 2024.
