= Monica Sales =

Monica Sales de la Cruz
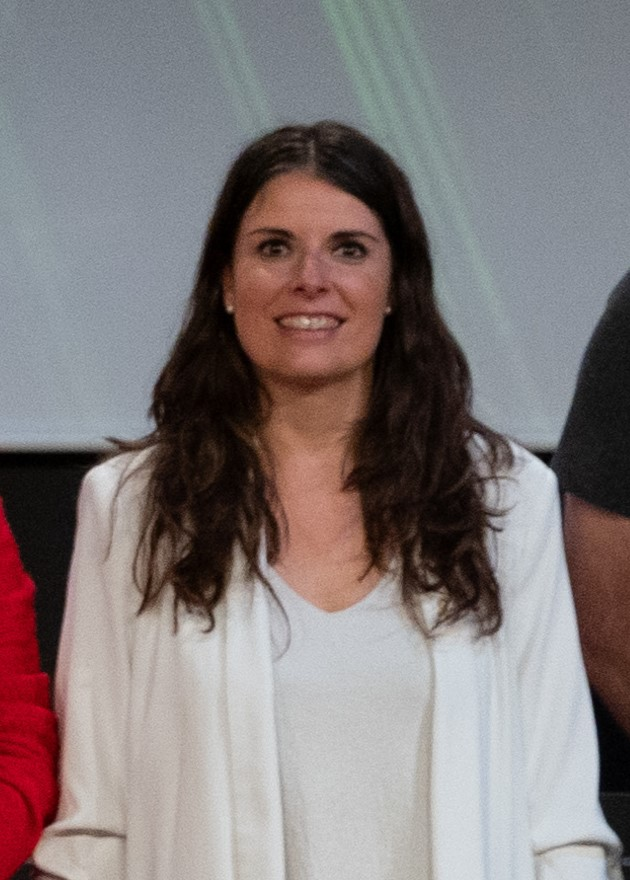

Member of the Parliament of Catalonia
- Incumbent
- Assumed office 12 May 2024
- Constituency: Tarragona
- In office 12 March 2021 – 12 May 2024
- Constituency: Tarragona
- In office 17 May 2018 – 21 December 2020
- Constituency: Tarragona

Personal details
- Born: 27 August 1983 (age 43) Tortosa, Catalonia
- Party: Together for Catalonia
- Education: University of Rovira i Virgili
- Occupation: Politician

Monica Sales de la Cruz (Tortosa, 21 September 1983) is a Catalan politician who has served as a member of the Parliament of Catalonia since 2018. She has been the vice-president of Together for Catalonia since 2024.
