= Rubén Viñuales =

Spanish politician (born 1983)

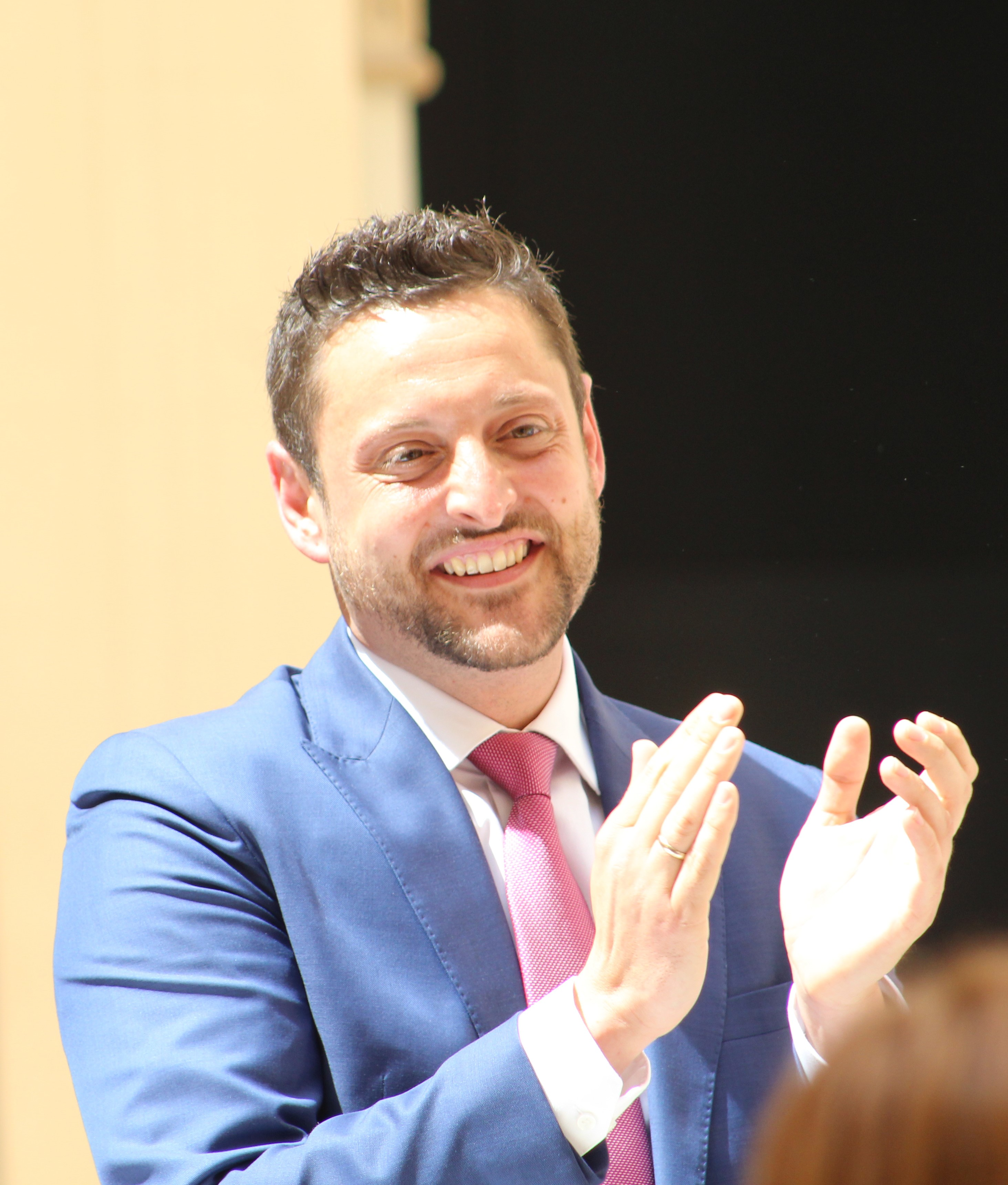
- Viñuales in 2022

Mayor of Tarragona
- Incumbent
- Assumed office 17 June 2023
- Preceded by: Pau Ricomà

Personal details
- Born: 26 June 1983 (age 43)
- Party: Socialists' Party of Catalonia (since 2020)

Rubén Viñuales i Elías (born 26 June 1983) is a Spanish politician serving as mayor of Tarragona since 2023. From 2021 to 2023, he was a member of the Parliament of Catalonia.
