= Antonio Ramón López Gómez =

Catalan politician

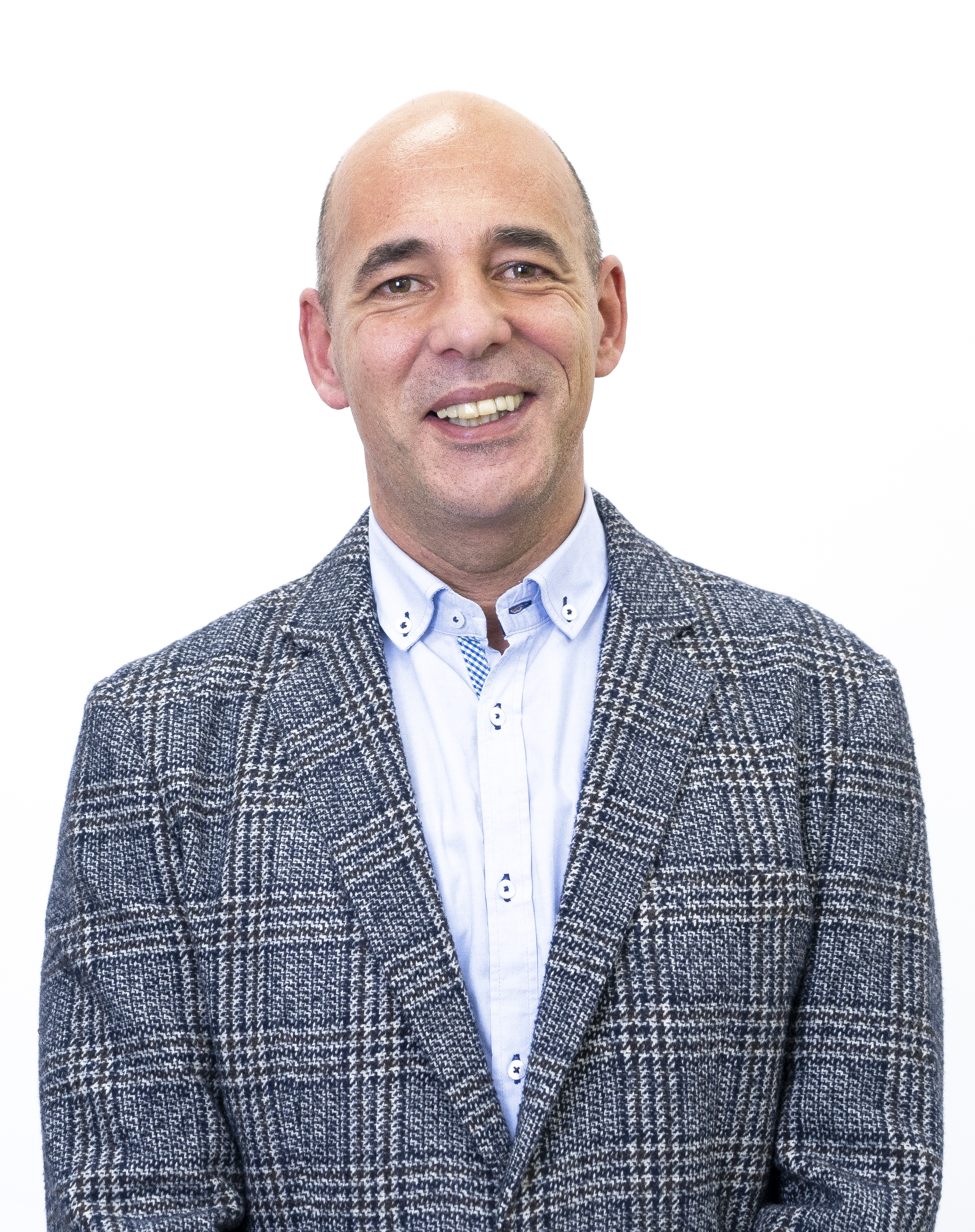

Member of the Parliament of Catalonia
- Incumbent
- Assumed office 12 March 2021

Personal details
- Born: 1974 (age 51–52) Lérida, Spain
- Party: Vox

Antonio Ramón López Gómez (born 1974) is a Catalan politician and a member of the Parliament of Catalonia for the Vox party.

Gómez was born to a Catalan family in Lérida. Before entering politics he worked as a mechanic at a garage owned by his parents before becoming a real estate developer. He was one of eleven Vox deputies elected to the Catalan Parliament in 2021 and was elected for the Lérida constituency. During his election campaign, Gómez complained to the authorities that his car had been repeatedly attacked with rocks and claimed Catalan separatists and far-left activists were the culprits.

In-line with Vox's official stance, Gómez is opposed to Catalan independence, calls for a zero tolerance approach to illegal immigration and wants better working conditions for public sector employees. In the Catalan Parliament he also sits on the committees for climate action and urban planning.
