= Mónica Lora =

Spanish politician (born 1988)

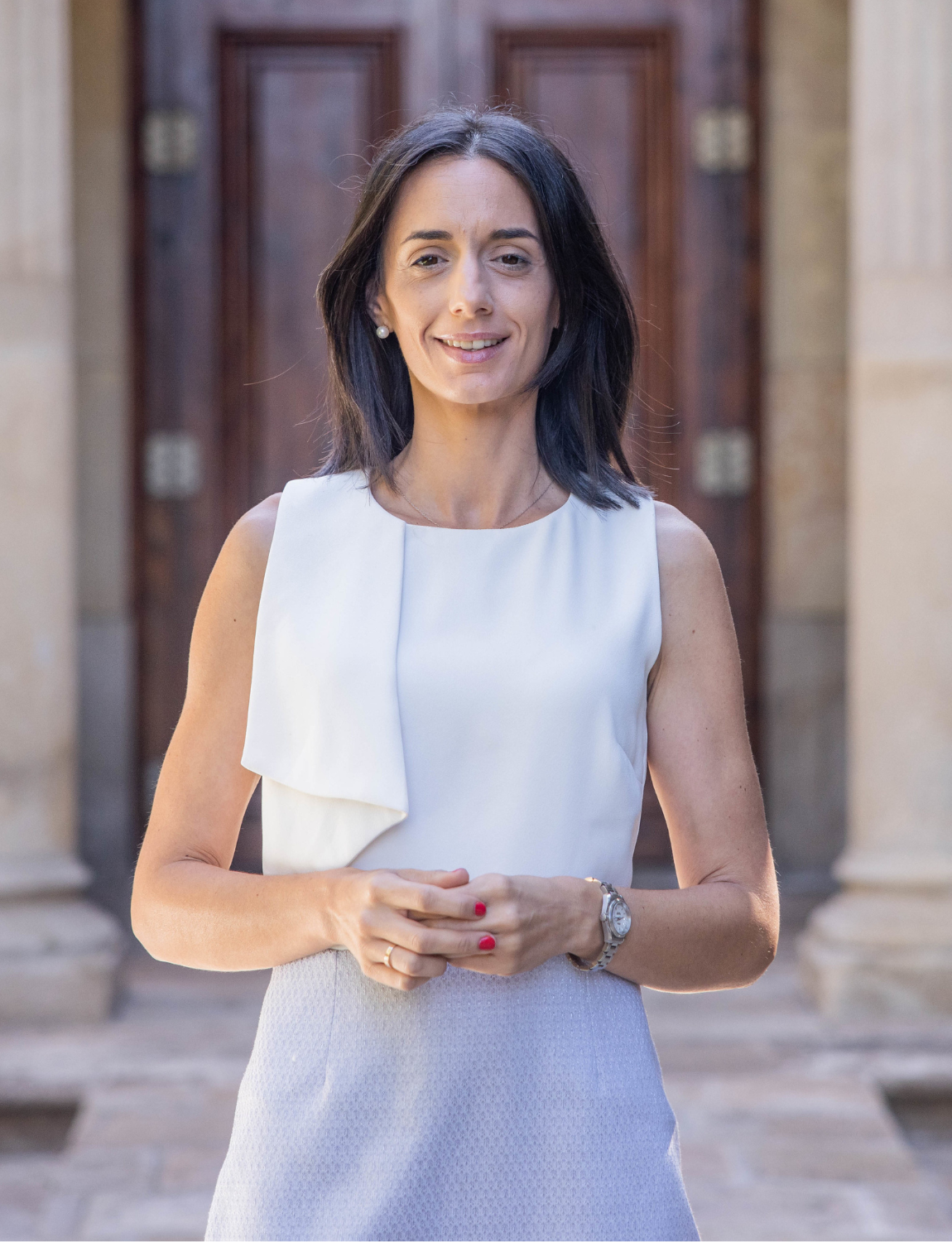
- Lora in 2024

Member of the Parliament of Catalonia
- Incumbent
- Assumed office 12 March 2021
- Constituency: Barcelona

Provincial Secretary Of Vox In Barcelona
- Incumbent
- Assumed office 2019

Personal details
- Born: 1 March 1988 (age 38)
- Party: Vox (since 2019)

Mónica Lora Cisquer (born 1 March 1988) is a Spanish politician serving as a member of the Parliament of Catalonia since 2021. She has served as provincial secretary of Vox in Barcelona since 2019.
