= Antonio Gallego Burgos =

Spanish politician

Antonio Gallego Burgos MP
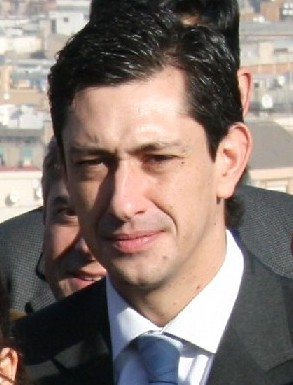

Member of the Parliament of Catalonia
- Incumbent
- Assumed office 14 February 2021
- Constituency: Barcelona

Member of the Congress of Deputies
- In office 31 March 2008 – 26 October 2015
- Constituency: Barcelona

Personal details
- Born: Antonio Gallego Burgos; 2 October 1975 (age 51) Barcelona, Spain
- Party: Independent (since 2022)
- Other political affiliations: Vox (2021–2022); People's Party (1999–2019); Convergència i Unió (before 1999)
- Education: University of Barcelona

Antonio Gallego Burgos (born 2 October 1975) is a Spanish politician. He served as a member of the Congress of Deputies from 2008 to 2015 as a member of the People's Party before standing for the Parliament of Catalonia in 2015, resigning his seat six months later.

In 2021, he was again elected to the Parliament of Catalonia representing the Vox party. He left the party in 2022, remaining in the Parliament as a non-inscrit.

== Biography ==
Burgos comes from a Catalan family and is a native of Barcelona. He studied an economics degree at the University of Barcelona. He was originally a member of the Catalan nationalist Convergència i Unió movement but became active in the People's Party of Catalonia and was a spokesman for the party in the region of El Prat de Llobregat where he was elected as a councilor. In the 2008 Spanish general election, he was elected to the Congress of Deputies representing the Barcelona constituency and was re-elected in 2011. In 2015, he stood down from the Congress to contest elections in the Parliament of Catalonia in September but resigned his seat in November of the same year.

In 2021, he announced on Twitter he had joined the Vox party and was again elected as a deputy to the Catalan Parliament for the Barcelona district. Although a native Catalan speaker himself, Burgos has accused Catalan nationalists of trying to teach children only Catalan in order to foster separation from the region with the rest of Spain. Burgos is also a member of the Small and Medium Sized Business Association of Catalonia.
