= Antoni Flores Ardiaca =

Spanish politician (1963–2023)

Antoni Flores i Ardiaca (7 February 1963 – 22 May 2023) was a Spanish engineer and politician from the Republican Left of Catalonia. He was elected to the Parliament of Catalonia in the 2021 Catalan regional election representing the province of Lleida, and served until his death at the age of 60.

== See also ==
- 13th Parliament of Catalonia
