= Assumpta Escarp =

Spanish jurist and politician

The Illustrious Assumpta Escarp MP
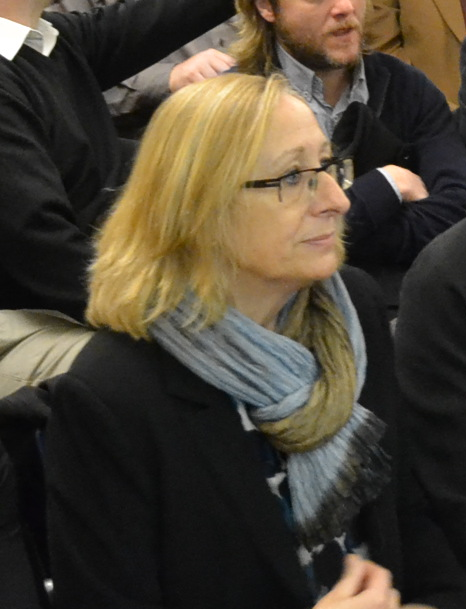

Member of the Parliament of Catalonia for the Province of Barcelona
- In office 26 October 2015 – 10 June 2024

Deputy Mayor of Barcelona
- In office 2010–2011

City Councilor of Barcelona
- In office 2003–2015

Personal details
- Born: Assumpta Escarp i Gibert; 1957 (age 68–69) Terrassa, Catalonia, Spain
- Party: Socialists' Party of Catalonia (1985–present)
- Other political affiliations: PSUC (formerly)
- Education: University of Barcelona; ESADE

Assumpta Escarp i Gibert (born 1957) is a Spanish jurist and Socialists' Party of Catalonia politician, member of the Parliament of Catalonia between 2015 and 2024 in which served as second vicepresident between 2021 and 2024.

== Biography ==
She studied law at the University of Barcelona and initially militated at the PSUC. She earned a master's degree in public management at ESADE. In 1985 she began to work at a research center at Hospital del Mar. Since then she joined the PSC and linked to the Barcelona City Council.

After participating in the creation of Pompeu Fabra University, in 1991, she worked for the management of the central services of the City Council of Barcelona, and in 1995 she was the head of the then mayor's Deputy Mayor, Joan Clos. When Clos was elected mayor will become head of mayor's office. She will be elected councilor in the municipal elections of 2003, 2007 and 2011. During these years she has been the councilor for Citizen Participation, Solidarity and Cooperation (2003–2006), of Urban Planning (2006–2007), councilor of the district of the Eixample (2006–2010), councilor for prevention, safety and mobility (2007–2010), president of Transports Metropolitans de Barcelona, third Deputy Mayor (2010–2011) and vice president of Environment of the Àrea Metropolitana de Barcelona (2011–2015).

She was elected to the Parliament of Catalonia in the elections of 2015, 2017 and 2021. On 5 October 2021, Escarp became the second vice president of the parliament, succeeding Eva Granados.

She retired from politics after the 2024 Catalan regional election.
