= David Pérez Ibáñez =

David Pérez
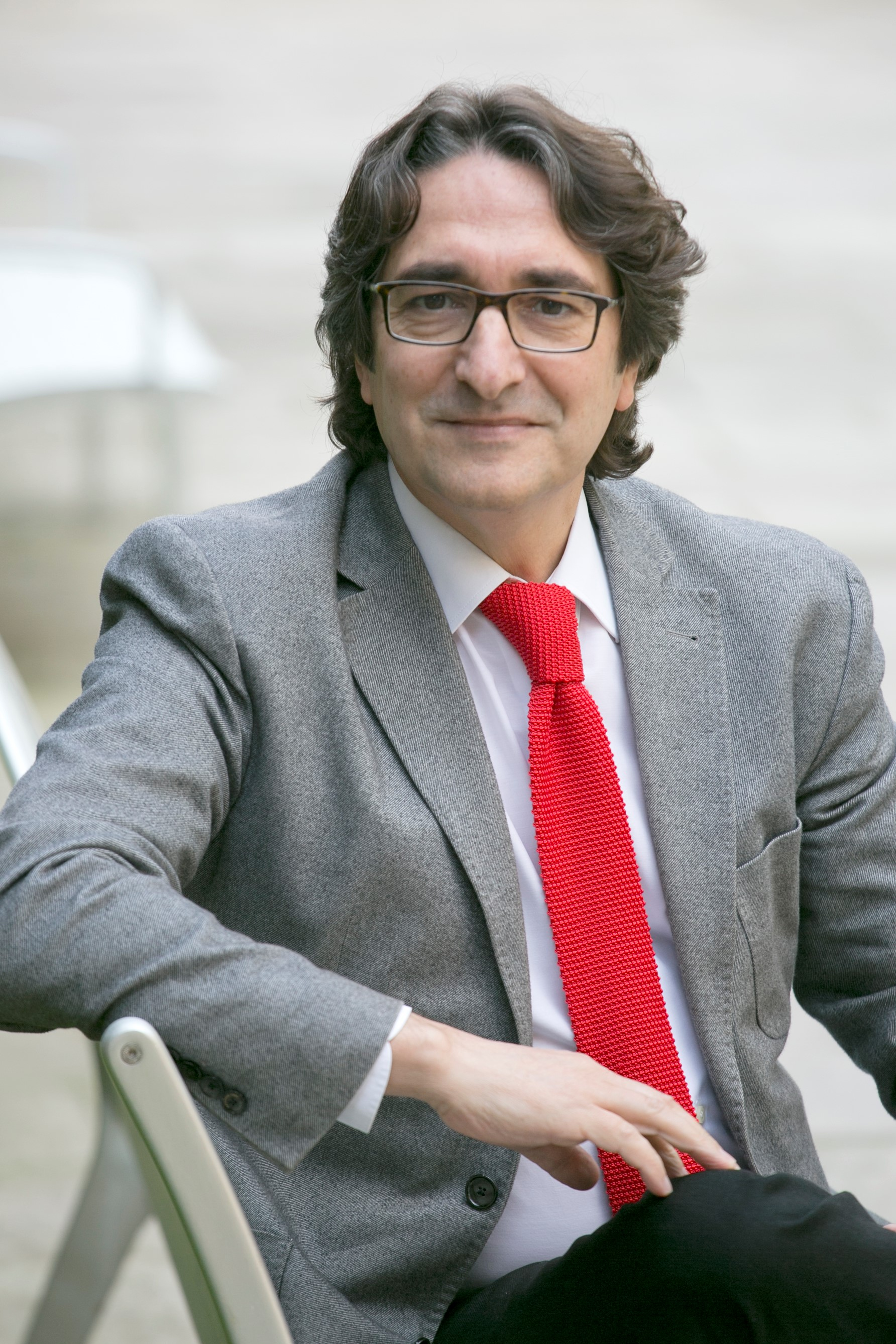

Second Vice-President of the Parliament of Catalonia
- Incumbent
- Assumed office 10 June 2024
- President: Josep Rull
- Preceded by: Assumpta Escarp

Member of the Parliament of Catalonia
- Incumbent
- Assumed office 12 March 2021
- Constituency: Barcelona
- In office 17 January 2018 – 21 December 2020
- Constituency: Barcelona
- In office 26 October 2015 – 28 October 2017
- Constituency: Barcelona
- In office 17 November 2006 – 5 October 2010
- Constituency: Barcelona
- In office 5 December 2003 – 8 September 2006
- Constituency: Barcelona
- In office 5 November 1999 – 23 September 2003
- Constituency: Barcelona

Personal details
- Born: 1960 (age 65–66) L'Hospitalet de Llobregat, Catalonia, Spain
- Party: Socialists' Party of Catalonia
- Education: University of Barcelona
- Occupation: Politician

Creating David Pérez Ibáñez (born, 1960) is a Spanish politician, since 2024 second vice-president of the Parliament of Catalonia.

== Biography ==
He studied at COU and obtained a postgraduate diploma in Political Science from the University of Barcelona. He is currently studying Humanities through the UOC. He has been a career civil servant in the public administration since 1981, as head of personnel selection and training negotiations. He is currently a deputy for the Province of Barcelona. He has held managerial responsibilities in the PSC between 2014 and 2017, a party he joined in 1979 and in which he continues to be a member.

He has been a councillor and deputy mayor of Casa de la Ciutat (l'Hospitalet de Llobregat) (1991-2003) serving as spokesperson for the municipal group until 1997 and in charge of the areas of culture, environment and social policy. He has been part of several metropolitan entities, such as the Mancomunitat de Municipis de Àrea Metropolitana de Barcelona and the Consorci de Comunicació Local (COM Ràdio). He is also a member of the Red Cross, the Unió General de Treballadors, the Club de Tir de Barcelona and the Centre d'Estudis de l'Hospitalet.

In 1999, the Socialist Party of Catalonia included him on the lists for the 1999 elections to the Parliament of Catalonia, in which he was elected deputy, a position he would maintain in the following elections of 2003 and 2006.

During this period, he served as deputy spokesperson for the Socialist Parliamentary Group, member of the group's leadership, deputy auditor, spokesperson for several parliamentary committees and rapporteur for several laws, among which the most notable are the Rules of Procedure of Parliament, the one on historical memory, the one on the creation of the Centre for Opinion Studies and the Anti-Fraud Office of Catalonia, the one on the Institute of Public Security of Catalonia and the joint report for a new electoral law for Catalonia.

In the 2010 regional elections he came in 25th place on the PSC list for Barcelona, so he did not revalidate his seat. He was later appointed advisor to the socialist group in the Barcelona Provincial Council and advisor to the Hospitalet de Llobregat City Council on matters of citizen security (2012-2013).

On February 3, 2015, he again occupied the position of deputy for the province of Barcelona in the Parliament of Catalonia, replacing Daniel Fernández González, who was forced to resign due to his relationship in a case with Manuel Bustos Garrido and the Cas Mercuri case.

In the 2015 Catalan Parliament elections on 27 September 2015, he was ranked 7th on the list of the Socialist Party of Catalonia and was re-elected as a deputy for the 11th legislature of the Catalan Parliament. He has held the position of Second Secretary of the Parliament Bureau and has been the spokesperson for the Socialist Parliamentary Group in the Control Commission of the Catalan Audiovisual Media Corporation. He currently holds the position of Second Vice-President of the Catalan Parliament.
