= Glòria Freixa =

Glòria Freixa i Vilardell

First Secretary of the Parliament of Catalonia
- Incumbent
- Assumed office 10 June 2024
- President: Josep Rull
- Preceded by: Ferran Pedret

Member of the Parliament of Catalonia
- Incumbent
- Assumed office 12 May 2024
- Constituency: Barcelona
- In office 12 March 2021 – 12 May 2024
- Constituency: Barcelona
- In office 28 May 2019 – 21 December 2020
- Constituency: Barcelona

Personal details
- Born: 13 March 1969 (age 57) Barcelona, Catalonia
- Party: Together for Catalonia
- Education: University of Barcelona
- Occupation: Lawyer ,Politician

Glòria Freixa i Vilardell (Barcelona, 13 March 1969) is a Catalan jurist and politician, a member of the 12th and 13th legislatures of the Parliament, in the candidacy of Junts per Catalunya and since 2024 First Secretary of the Parliament of Catalonia.

== Biography ==
She holds a Law degree from the University of Barcelona (UB), with studies in Political Science also at the UB. She subsequently took the data protection module of the Master's in Intellectual Property and Information Society at ESADE. She worked for thirteen years as a lawyer in the legal department of the Catalan Data Protection Authority. Previously, in 1998 she founded and managed the Laporta & Arbós office in Buenos Aires. Later, in 2000, she founded and managed the Roca Junyent office in Buenos Aires, joining the Roca Junyent firm's team in Barcelona two years later.

In the late 1990s he participated in the platform led by Joan Laporta Elefant Blau, a group of members of the Barcelona Football Club opposed to the management of Josep Lluís Núñez. In 1998 he founded, together with other collaborators, the Group of Catalan Businessmen in Argentina (GREC)[Inactive link]. An association that aims to defend the identity of Catalan businessmen displaced to Argentina.

In the political sphere, she was part of the electoral list for Barcelona of President Carles Puigdemont in the 2017 elections to the Parliament of Catalonia. She entered the Parliament of Catalonia as a deputy in 2019 following the resignation of Laura Borràs as a deputy to the Catalan chamber. She was re-elected as a deputy in the 2021 elections to the Parliament of Catalonia for Barcelona. She actively participates in the formation of Junts per Catalunya and has different functions and responsibilities, among which is the coordination of the Junts per Catalunya group in the Sarrià-Sant Gervasi district.

She has been a member of Òmnium Cultural since 2015 and currently actively participates in it. In 2018, she established and chaired one of the entity's territorial boards in the Sarrià-Sant Gervasi district.

In 2024, she ran for the Catalan Parliament elections as 10th on the list for Barcelona of Junts per Catalunya and was elected first secretary of the Parliament's bureau.Since October 2024, she has been the housing spokesperson for her party.
