= Palau del Parlament de Catalunya =

- Palacio del Parlamento de Cataluña
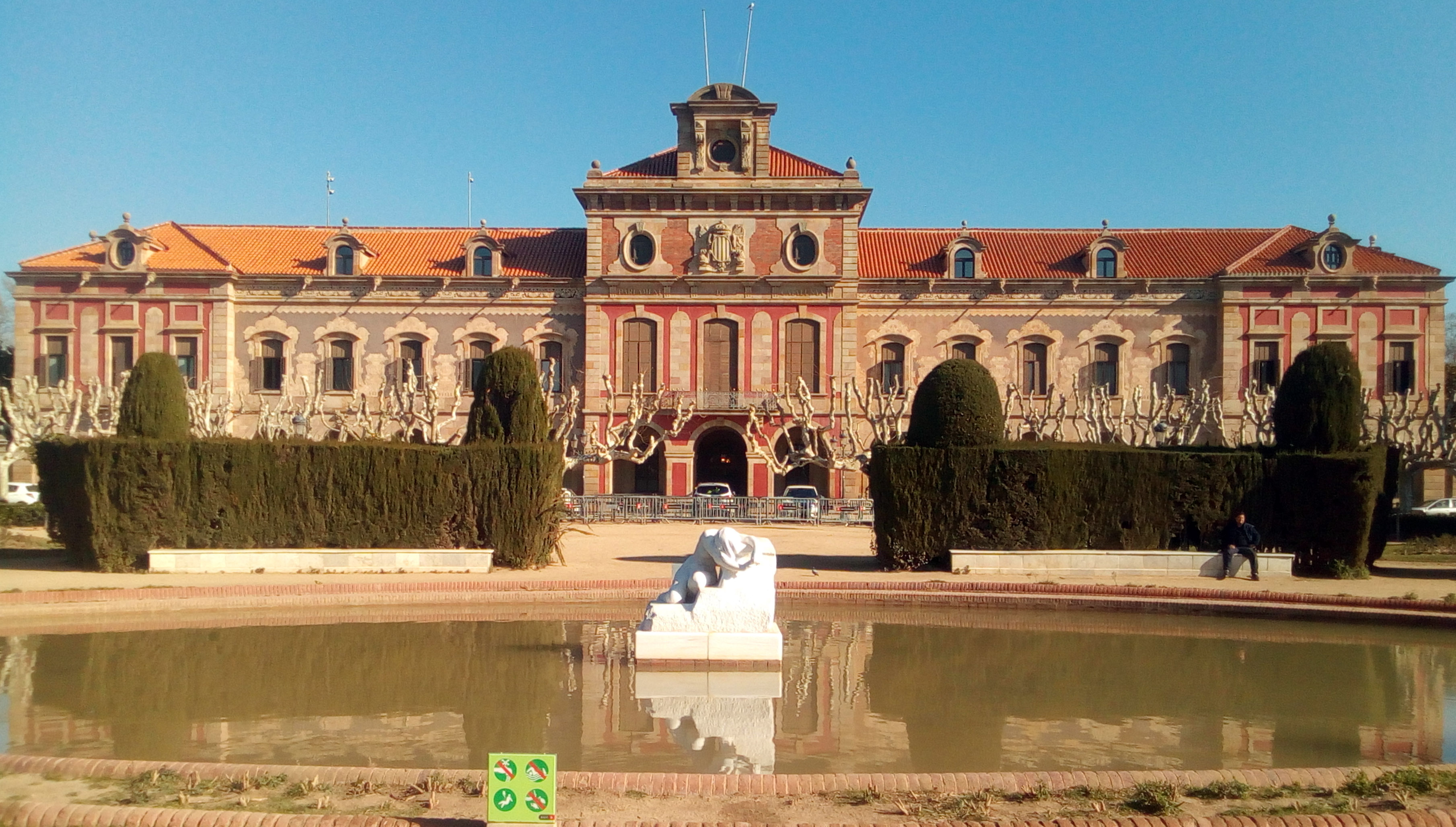
- West façade of the palace

General information
- Status: Intact
- Type: Arsenal (later palace)
- Architectural style: Historicist, Neoclassical
- Location: Barcelona, Catalonia, Spain, Plaça de Joan Fiveller 1, Parc de la Ciutadella
- Coordinates: 41°23′17″N 2°11′20″E
- Current tenants: Parliament of Catalonia
- Construction started: 1717
- Completed: 1727
- Owner: Generalitat de Catalunya

Technical details
- Material: Montjuïc stone and red tile
- Floor count: 3
- Floor area: 5,532 m^{2} (59,550 sq ft)

Design and construction
- Architect: Jorge Próspero de Verboom

The Palau del Parlament de Catalunya (English: Palace of the Parliament of Catalonia; Spanish: Palacio del Parlamento de Cataluña) is the seat of the Parliament of Catalonia, located in Barcelona. It was built between 1717 and 1727 as the arsenal of the Ciutadella, to the designs of Jorge Próspero de Verboom.

After the Ciutadella was demolished in the mid-19th century, the building was used for various purposes, including a barracks, a royal palace and an art museum. The palace was the meeting place of the Parliament of Catalonia from 1932 to 1939, when it was dissolved during the Spanish Civil War. With the re-establishment of Parliament in 1980, the palace was renovated and it once again became the seat of Parliament.

In 2012, on the occasion of the National Day of Catalonia the arms of the Generalitat de Catalunya was placed on the main façade over the coat of arms of the arms of Philip V installed in 1889.

== History ==
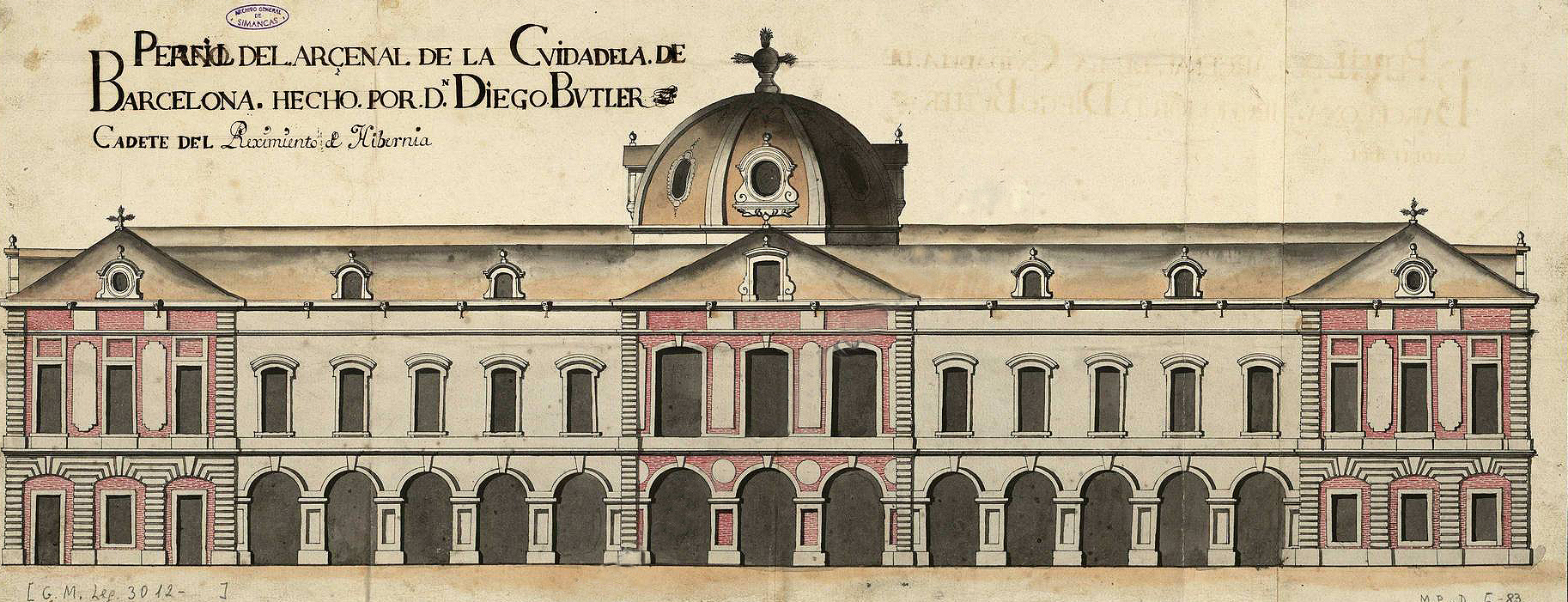
Elevation of the Arsenal of the Ciutadella, 1725

The palace was built as the arsenal of the Ciutadella, a star fort which was built by Philip V of Spain after the War of the Spanish Succession, during which Catalonia had supported his opponent Archduke Charles. It was designed by the Flemish military engineer Jorge Próspero de Verboom, and was constructed between 1717 and 1727. The building underwent some minor restoration work later on in the 18th century.

The fortifications of the Ciutadella were demolished following the 1868 revolution, but the arsenal, chapel and governor's palace were retained. The rest of the site was landscaped and opened to the public as the Parc de la Ciutadella. At this point, the arsenal was converted into a temporary barracks.

In 1889, Barcelona's city council agreed to convert the former arsenal into a Royal Palace. The architect Pere Falqués was responsible for the alterations the building, which included opening three balconies at the first floor and the decoration of the entire façade. The central part of the façade was also increased in height, and was decorated with a stone escutcheon relocated from the Porta del Socors, one of the gates of the former Ciutadella.

In 1900, the building was converted into the Museu Municipal d'Art. The building was too small to house the art museum, so two side wings were built with the same materials as the original building in 1915. The façades of the extensions are decorated with busts of notable Catalan artists and people associated with Catalan art. The area in front of the palace, originally the Ciutadella's parade ground, was converted into a garden in 1927. It includes a pond with a copy of the sculpture Desolation by Josep Llimona i Bruguera.

The Barcelona city council ceded the palace to become the seat of the Parliament of Catalonia on 14 October 1932. The building was renovated by the decorator Santiago Marco, and the inaugural session was held on 6 December 1932. After Barcelona fell to the Nationalists during the Spanish Civil War, the building was converted into a barracks on 26 January 1939. It was converted back into an art museum in 1945, now known as the Museu d'Art Modern.

After democracy returned to Spain following the death of dictator Francisco Franco, the Parliament of Catalonia was restored in 1980, and restoration works were undertaken to the palace. The building was eventually donated by the city council to the Generalitat de Catalunya. The Museu d'Art Modern continued to occupy part of the palace until September 2004, when its collections were moved to the Museu Nacional d'Art de Catalunya. Since then, the palace has been used exclusively for parliamentary purposes.

The building is listed as a Bé Cultural d'Interès Local (BCIL) on the Inventari del Patrimoni Cultural Català with the code 08019/125.

== Architecture ==
The palace is built in the form of a cross, with a dome at the centre and four courtyards. The building has two floors and an attic, having an area of 5,532 m^{2} (59,550 sq ft). It is built out of Montjuïc stone and red tile.

The present parliament chamber was originally designed by Falqués as the Saló del Tron, the palace's Throne Room.

== Gallery ==
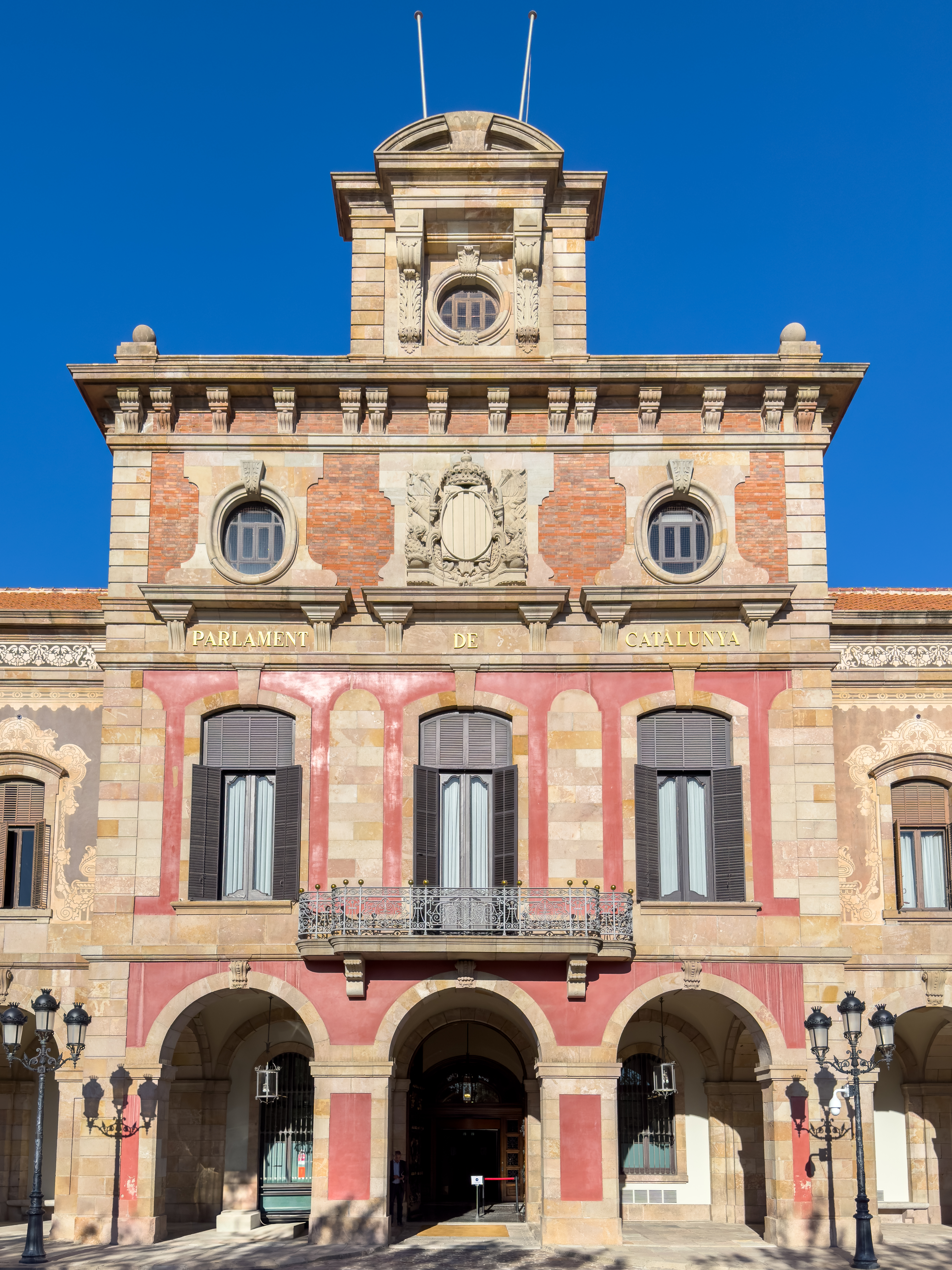
Façade

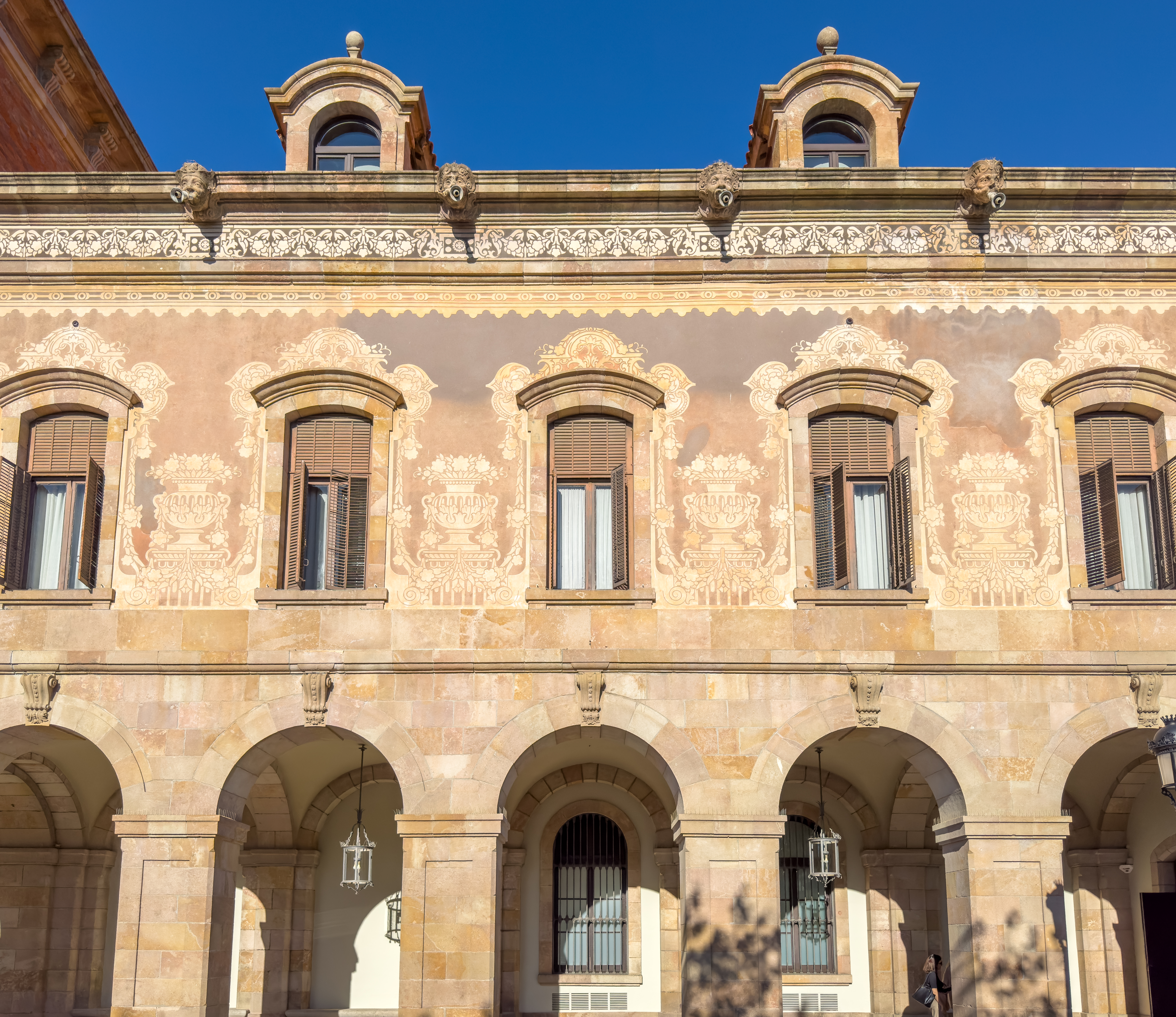
Façade

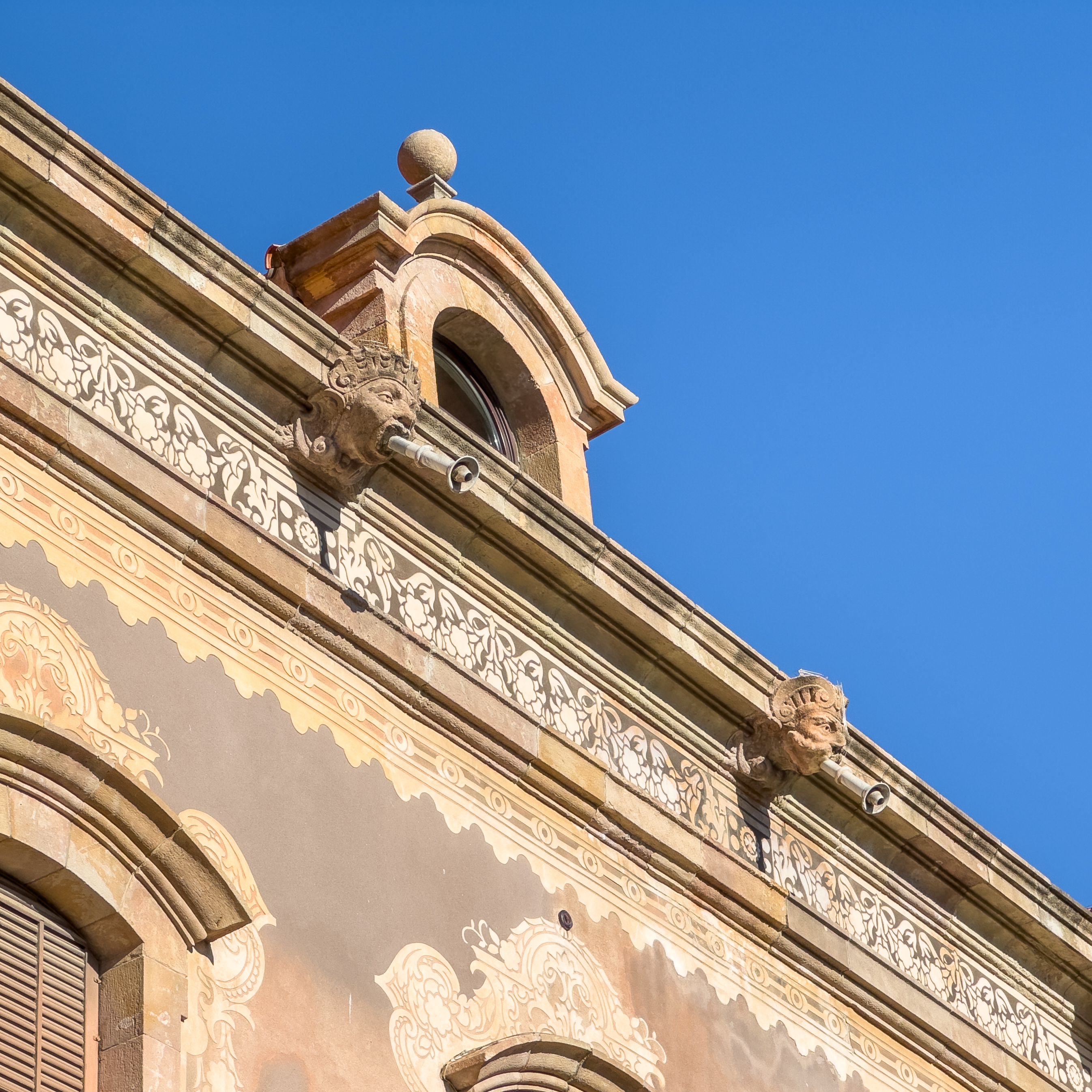
Façade

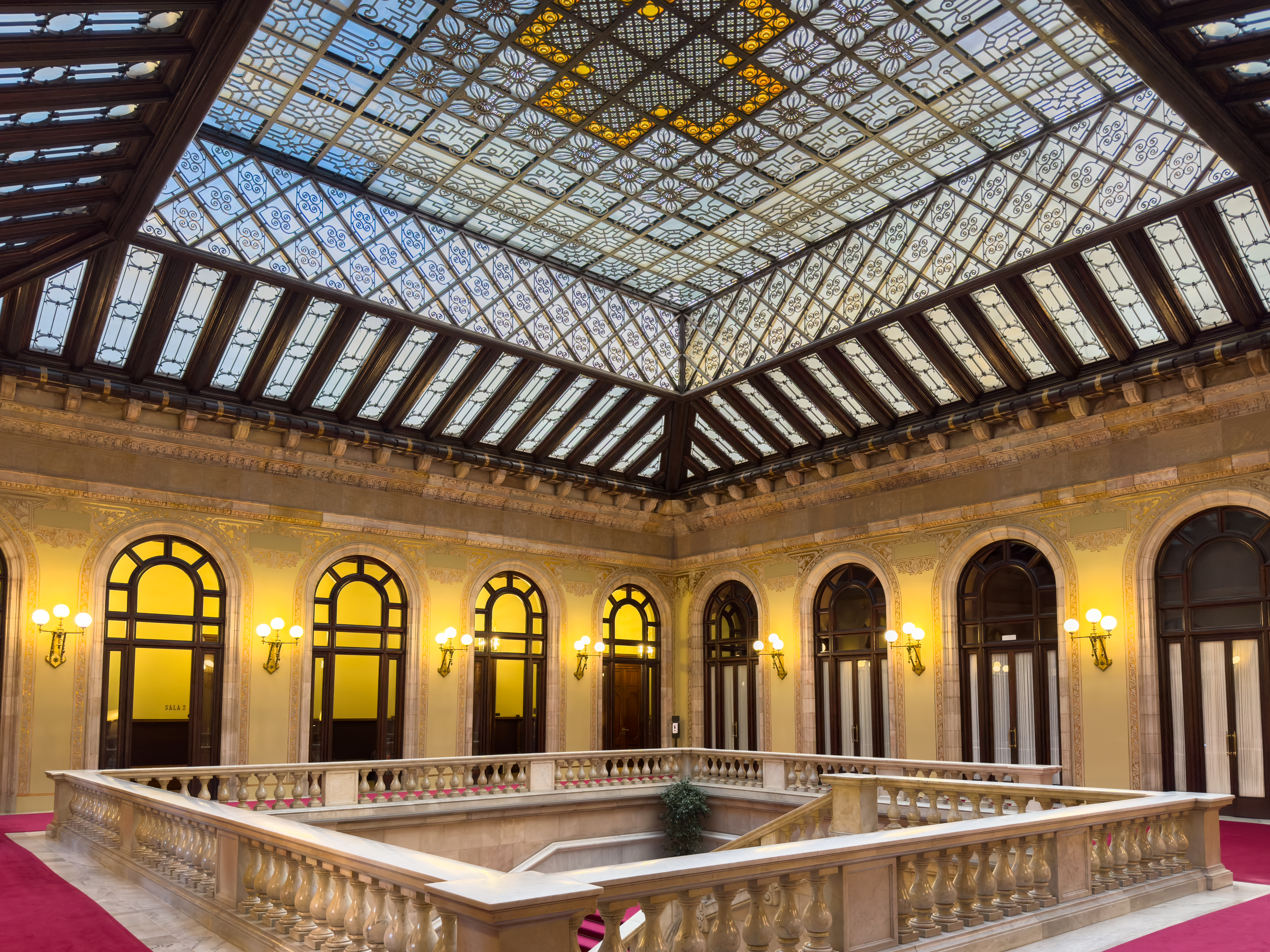
Interior

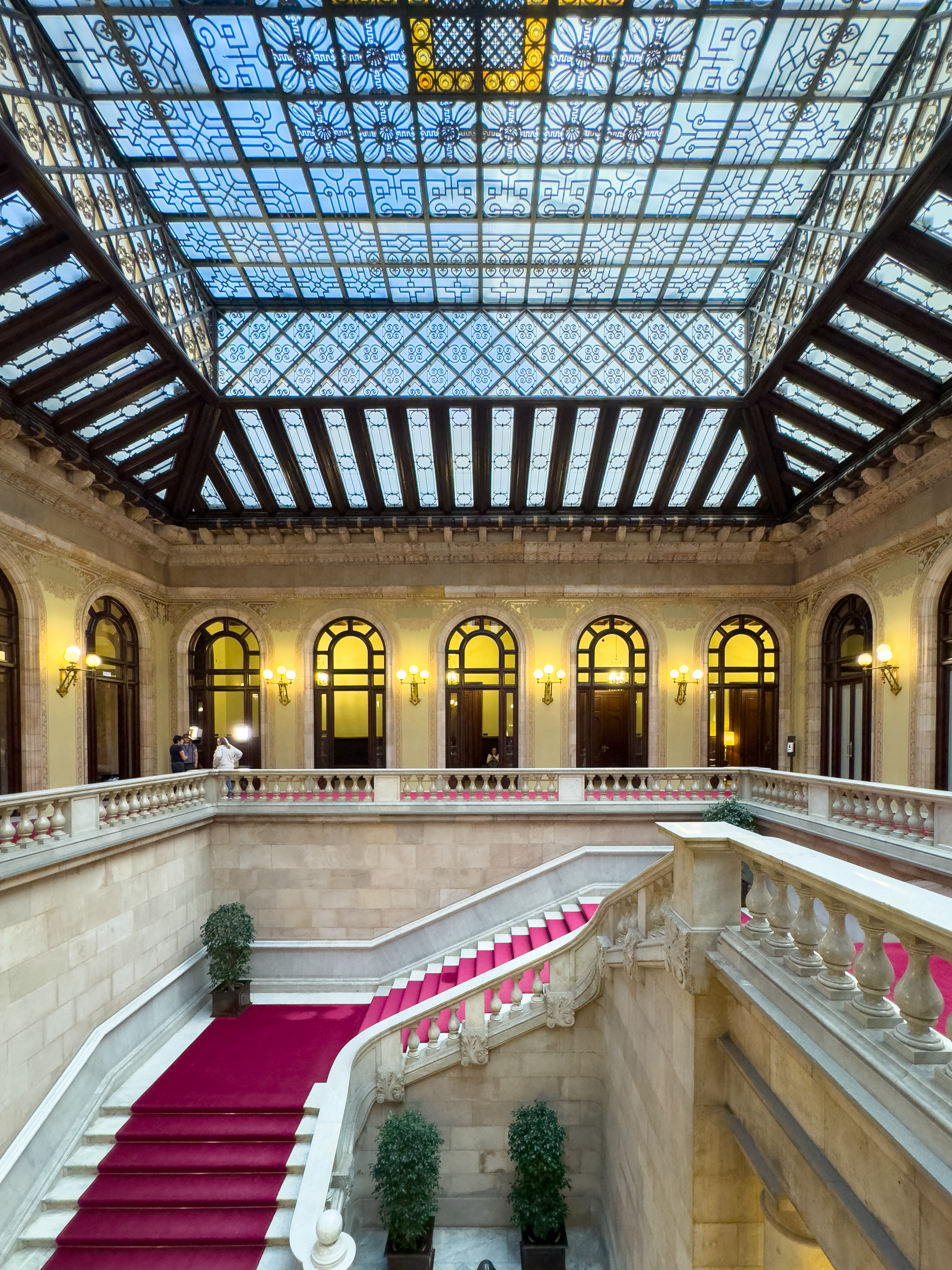
Interior

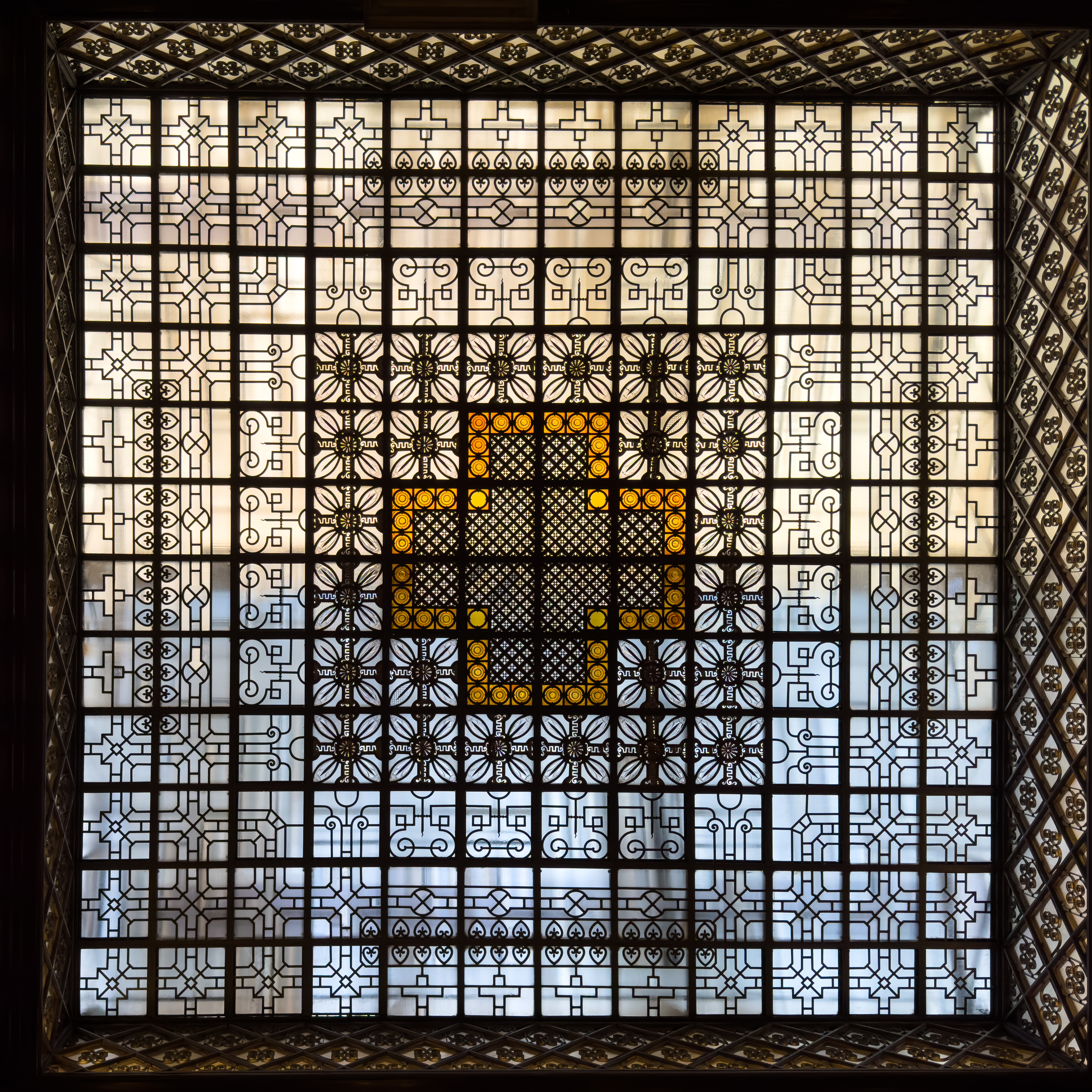
Interior

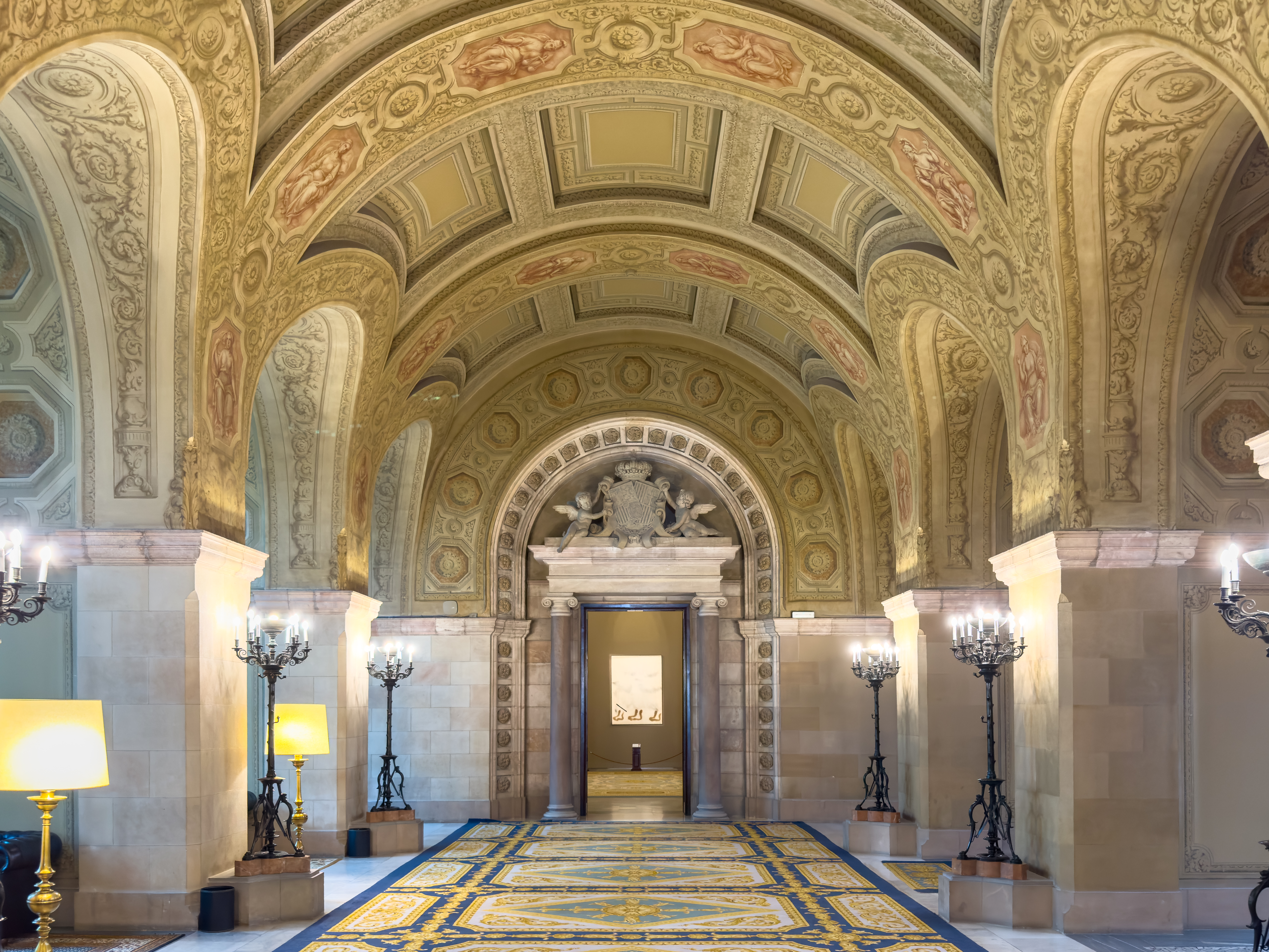
Saló dels Canelobres

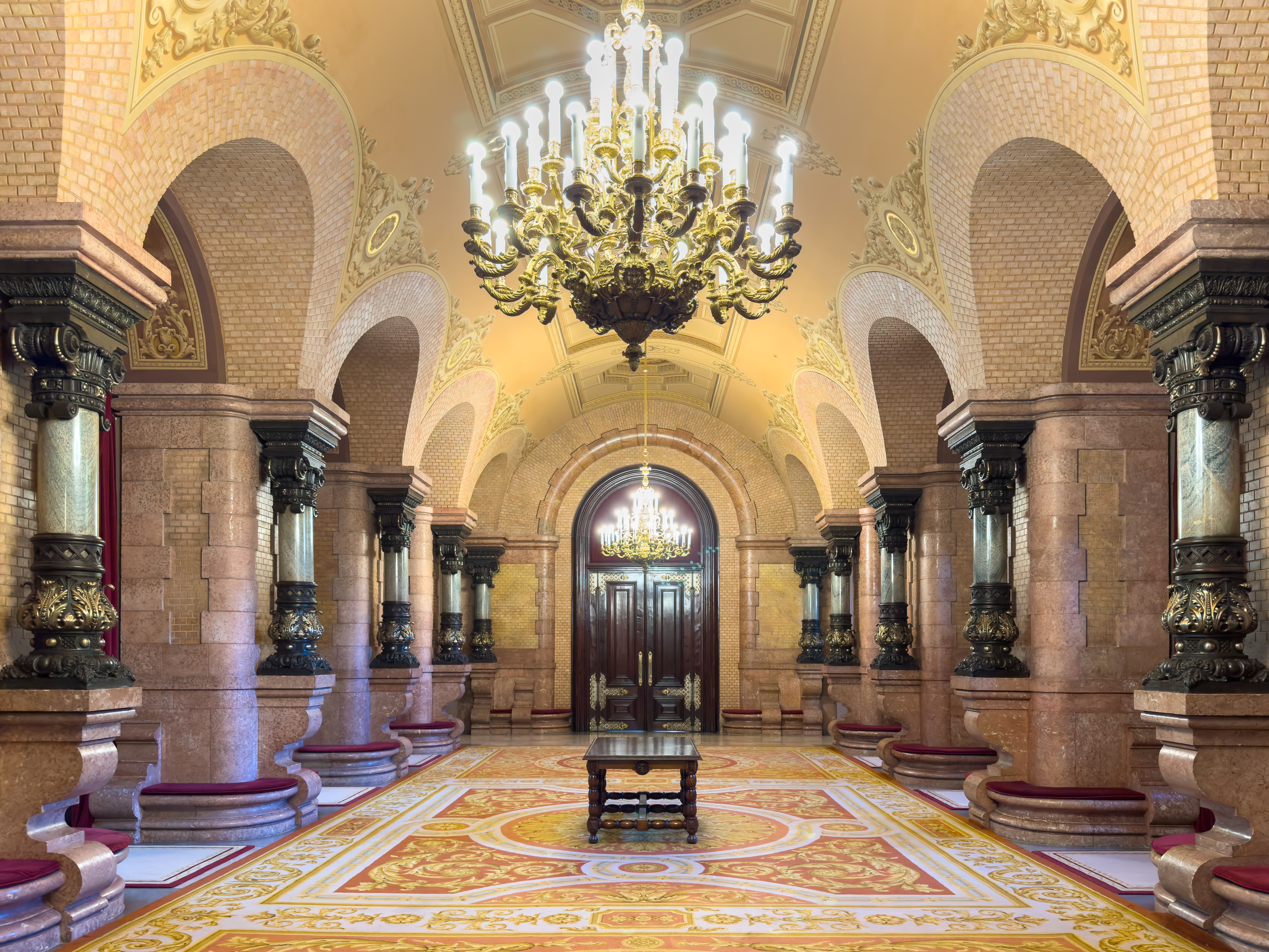
Saló Rosa de passos perduts

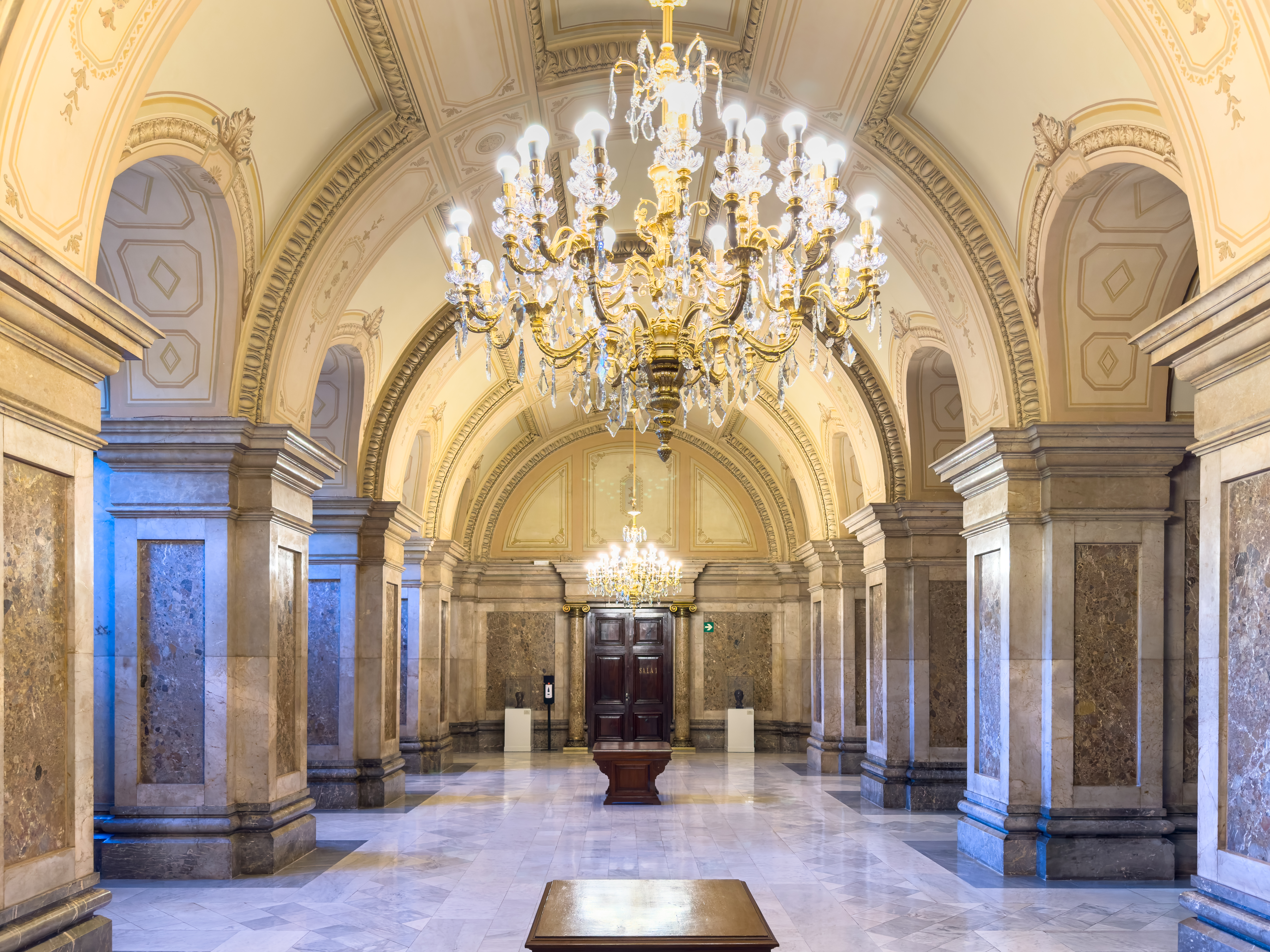
Saló Gris de passos perduts

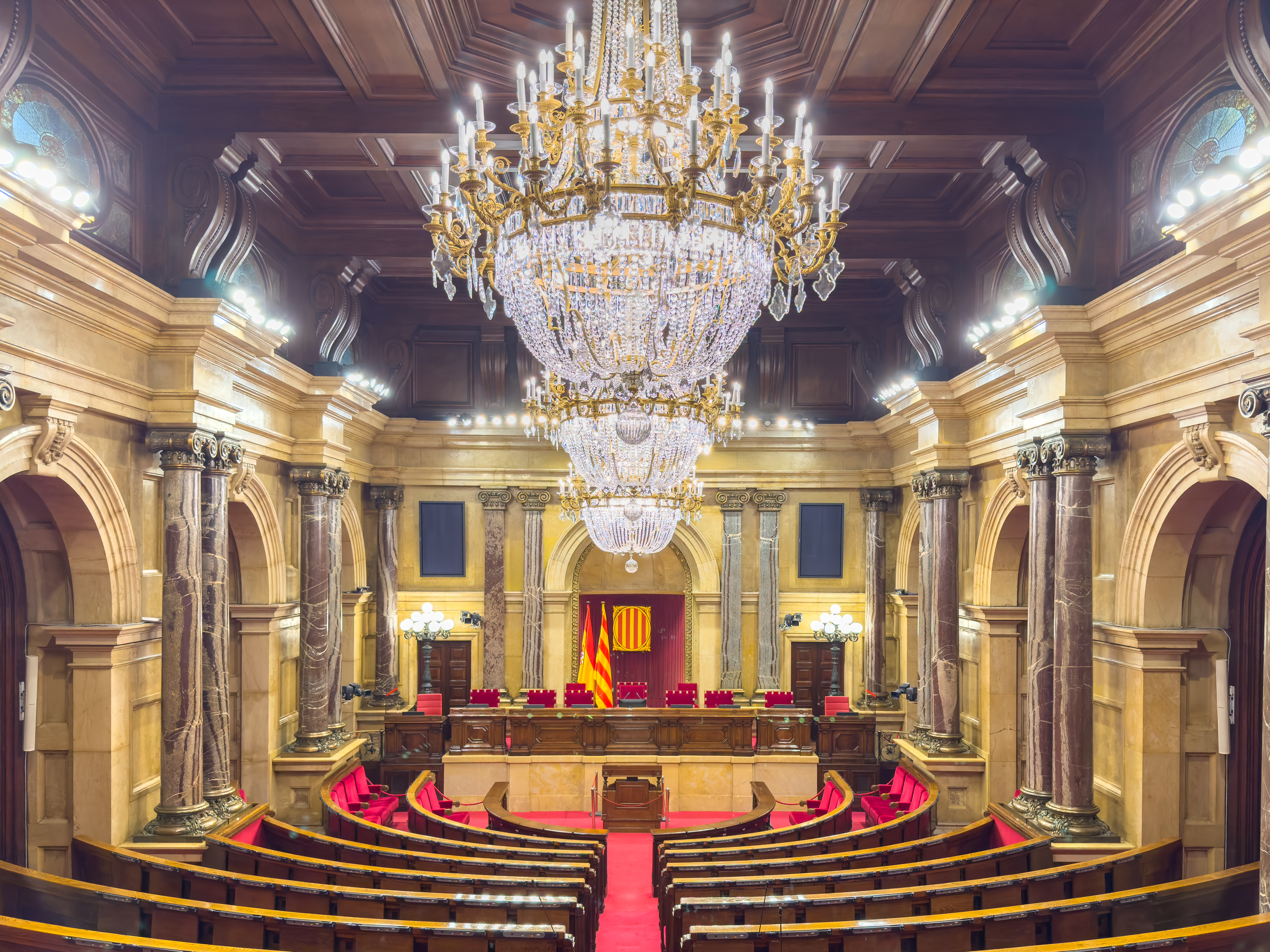
Hemicycle
