= Rosa Maria Ibarra =

Spanish Catalan jurist and politician

The Illustrious Rosa Maria Ibarra MP

Member of the Parliament of Catalonia
- Incumbent
- Assumed office 26 October 2015
- Constituency: Tarragona

Valls City Councilor
- In office 2007–2022

Personal details
- Born: Rosa Maria Ibarra Ollé; 10 September 1969 (age 57) Alió, Spain
- Party: Socialists' Party of Catalonia
- Children: 2
- Education: University of Lleida

Rosa Maria Ibarra i Ollé (born 10 September 1969) is a Spanish Catalan jurist and politician.

== Career ==
She holds a degree in Law from the University of Lleida and a Master in Leadership for Social and Political Management from the Autonomous University of Barcelona. She worked as head of delegation at the House of the Urban Property of Tarragona until she was elected as parliamentary and is a member of the Institute of Vallencs Studies.

Militant of the PSC-PSOE since 2005, she was chosen councilor of the City Council of Alió in the 1999 municipal elections in Spain and 2003, and councilor of the municipality of Valls in the Spanish municipal elections of 2007, 2011 and in 2015 local elections, was candidate to Mayor, but was not elected and became spokeswoman for the municipal socialist group, she also was candidate in the 2019 Spanish local elections and was reelected spokeswoman. From 1999 to 2015 she has been a member of the Alt Camp Regional Council.

In 2015 she was President of the Council of Federation of the PSC of the Camp de Tarragona. She was elected deputy to the elections of the Parliament of Catalonia of 2015 and those of 2017, where she was head of the provincial list after the dissolution of the Parliament in application of article 155 of the Spanish Constitution. Ibarra is member of the national executive of the PSC.
