= Raquel Sans =

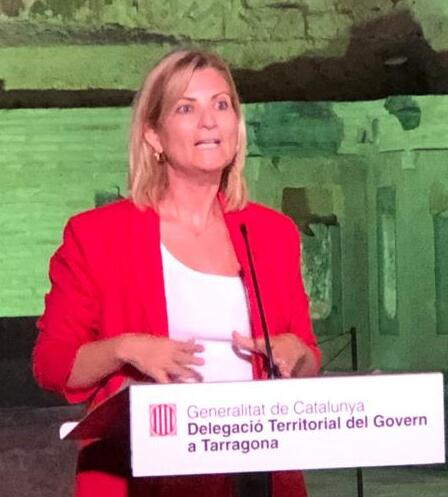

First Vice President of the Parliament of Catalonia
- Incumbent
- Assumed office 10 June 2024
- President: Josep Rull
- Preceded by: Alba Vergés

Member of the Parliament of Catalonia
- Incumbent
- Assumed office 31 July 2018
- Constituency: Tarragona

Personal details
- Born: 9 June 1980 (age 46) Valls, Catalonia
- Party: Republican Left of Catalonia
- Education: Autonomous University of Barcelona
- Occupation: journalist

Raquel Sans i Guerra (Valls, 9 June 1980) is a Catalan journalist and politician who has been the First Vice-President of the Parliament of Catalonia since 10 June 2024.

== Biography ==
Born in Valls, she holds a degree in journalism from the Autonomous University of Barcelona and a master's degree in social and labor journalism from the same higher education institution. She has been a journalist for Diari de Tarragona and TAC 12, a presenter of the program Quarts de nou on Catalan Television, a cultural management technician at the Tarragona City Council and an associate professor at the Rovira i Virgili University. She has lived in Tarragona for several years.

In the 2017 Catalan parliamentary election, Sans was the sixth ERC-Catalunya Sí candidate in the Tarragona constituency as an independent candidate. She was not elected, but in July 2018, when Óscar Peres became a member of parliament from Vall d’Aran, she was appointed as the government representative in Tarragona.

In the 2021 Catalan parliamentary election, Sans led the Republican Left of Catalonia's candidacy in the Tarragona constituency and served as a member of the Catalan Parliament in the 12th legislature.

She led the Republican Left of Catalonia candidacy in the 2024 Catalan parliamentary election for the Tarragona constituency.
