= Parliament of Catalonia =

Parliament that exercises the legislative power of the Government of Catalonia

Coordinates: 41°23′17″N 2°11′20″E

Parliament of Catalonia Parlament de Catalunya (Catalan) Parlamento de Cataluña (Spanish) Parlament de Catalonha (Occitan)
- 15th Parliament

Type
- Type: Unicameral

History
- Founded: 1932
- Disbanded: 1939–1979 (exiled)
- Preceded by: General Court of Catalonia (pre-1714)

Leadership
- President (Speaker): Josep Rull, Junts since 10 June 2024
- First Vice President: Raquel Sans, ERC since 10 June 2024
- Second Vice President: David Pérez, PSC since 10 June 2024
- First Secretary: Glòria Freixa, Junts since 10 June 2024
- President of the Government: Salvador Illa, PSC since 10 August 2024
- Leader of the Opposition: Monica Sales, Junts since 8 August 2024

Structure
- Seats: 135
- Political groups: Government (42): PSC (42) (Note: PSC (40); Units (2)); Supported by (26): ERC (20); Comuns Sumar (6) (Note: Comuns (5); MS (1)); Opposition (67): Junts (35); PP (15); Vox (11); CUP (4); AC (2)

Elections
- Voting system: Party-list proportional representation
- Last election: 12 May 2024
- Next election: No later than 2028

Meeting place
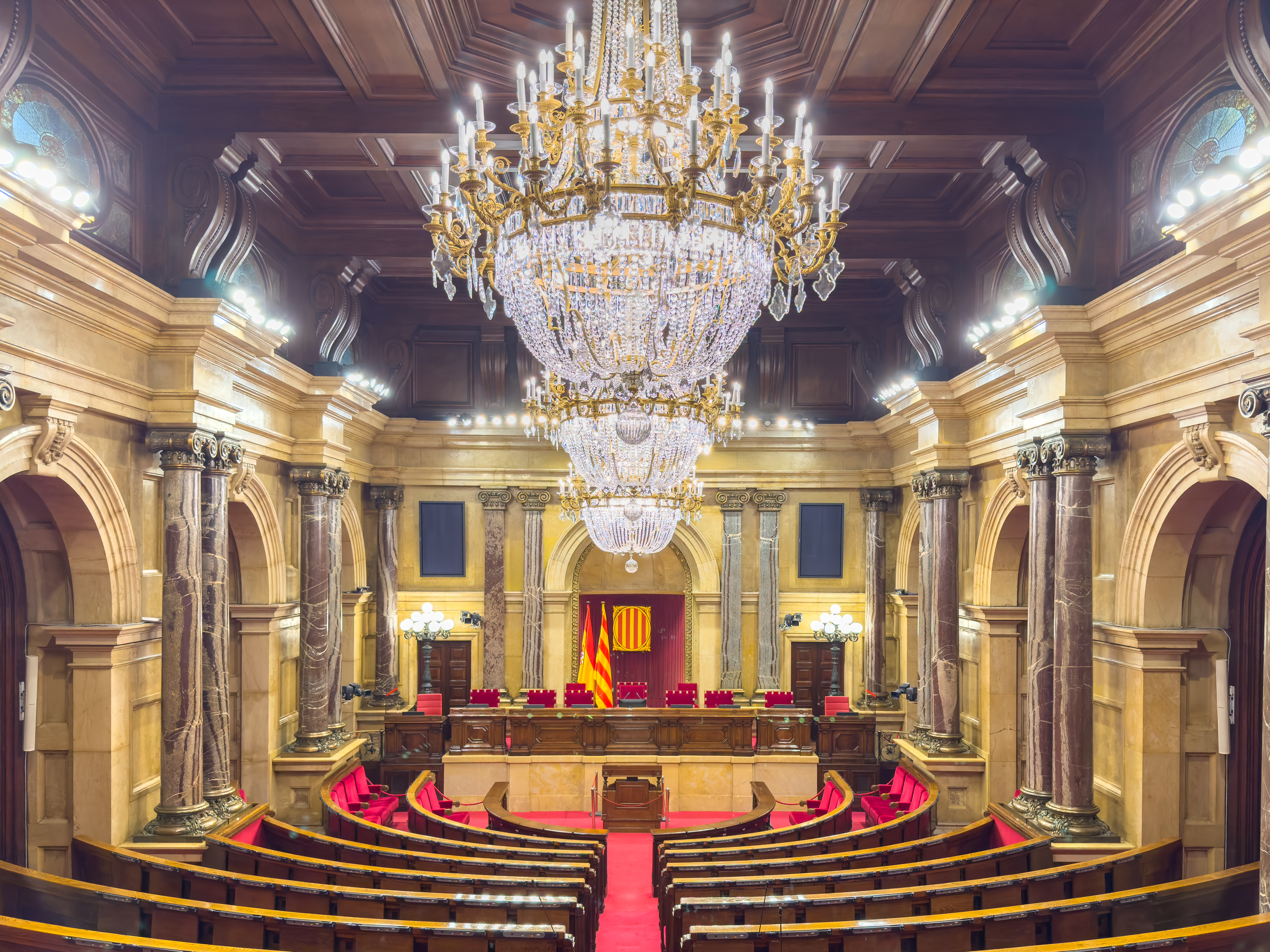
- Palau del Parlament de Catalunya; Parc de la Ciutadella, Ciutat Vella, Barcelona, Barcelonès

Website
- www.parlament.cat

The Parliament of Catalonia (Catalan: Parlament de Catalunya, IPA: [pəɾləˈmen də kətəˈluɲə]; Spanish: Parlamento de Cataluña, IPA: [paɾlaˈmento de kataˈluɲa]; Occitan: Parlament de Catalonha) is the unicameral legislature of the autonomous community of Catalonia. It has 135 members, known as deputies (diputats/diputados/deputats), who are elected for four-year terms or after an early dissolution, chosen by universal suffrage in lists of four constituencies, corresponding to the Catalan provinces. The Parliament building is located in Ciutadella Park, Barcelona.

Established in 1932, after the granting of self-governance to Catalonia by the Second Spanish Republic, it was in exile from 1939 to 1979 as a consequence of the Nationalist victory in the Spanish Civil War and was only formally reestablished during the transition to democracy. The most recent general election to the Parliament was held on 12 May 2024.

== Historical background ==
=== General Court of Catalonia ===
The first representative and legislative bodies in Catalonia were the Comital Court (Catalan: Cort Comtal) of Barcelona, modelling after the Frankish curia regis, and the Peace and Truce of God Assemblies (Assemblees de Pau i Treva), of which the earliest record dates from 1027. The last ones were originally ad hoc, local meetings convened by the clergy (Oliba, Bishop of Vic, who died in 1046, was a notable instigator) but progressively became subsumed into the court of the Counts of Barcelona. The first Catalan legal code, the Usatges de Barcelona, was promulgated by Count Ramon Berenguer I based on the decisions of these assemblies.

Although the counts of Barcelona, had greatly extended the territory under their control, their financial and military power was quite limited, due to the impact of the Feudal revolution during the regency of countess Ermesinde of Carcassonne (1018-1044). Their personal resources were particularly insufficient in periods of economic crisis or military expansion, of which they were many from the twelfth to the fifteenth centuries. The need to secure troops and revenue led to the steady expansion of the Count's Court (Royal Court after the dynastic union of Barcelona and the Kingdom of Aragon, creating the Crown of Aragon) and a formalisation of its procedures. It came to be referred to as the Cort General de Catalunya or Corts catalanes (General Court of Catalonia or Catalan Courts), and was endowed with formal procedures, effectively written constitutions, by King Peter III of Aragon in 1283, making this institution the policymaking and legislative body of the Principality of Catalonia. It was the first parliament of Europe to officially obtain the right of legislate, beyond the already established custom.

The Corts Catalanes were summoned and presided by the king as count of Barcelona, being composed of Three Estates (Tres Braços), representing the clergy, the feudal nobles and the citizens of Royal towns such as Barcelona or Girona. Inhabitants of feudal towns (such as Cardona) were not represented, except by their overlords. The main function of the Corts was legislative, either in approving laws proposed by the monarch (Constitutions of Catalonia) or at their own initiative (capítols de cort). Although the General Court of Catalonia met at irregular intervals, it also formally approved the acts of the between the King and their sessions (known as pragmàtiques) and, from 1359, established a permanent delegation to oversee the Crown (the Deputation of the General, forerunner of the Generalitat de Catalunya). The Catalan Courts, as well as the other institutions of the Principality and the administrative use of Catalan language, were abolished by the Nueva Planta decrees in 1716 after the House of Bourbon, supported by the Crown of Castile, defeated the Habsburg pretender to throne, which was backed by the remnants of the Crown of Aragon in the War of the Spanish Succession.

=== Modern history ===
==== First proposals of a Catalan assembly ====
There were attempts from late 19th century to restore an autonomous system of representation for Catalonia. The Manresa Bases (1892) proposed the creation of new Catalan Courts, partly modeled on the original ones. On the other hand, republican federalists and left-wing Catalan nationalists made their own proposals of a liberal and democratic Catalan assembly. The first achievement of Catalan nationalism (led at that time by the Regionalist League), the Commonwealth of Catalonia (1914–25), was an institution composed by the provincial councils (diputaciones) of Barcelona, Girona, Lleida and Tarragona, which included a general assembly made up by representatives from the four provinces, but lacking legislative powers. In 1919, the Commonwealth prepared a project of Statute of Autonomy for Catalonia which included a bicameral parliament, however, the bill wasn't implemented. The assembly and the Commonwealth itself were disbanded and outlawed by Miguel Primo de Rivera's dictatorship in 1925.

==== Republic and Generalitat ====
Following a brief proclamation of the Catalan Republic on 14 April 1931 and the provisional establishment of the Generalitat as a Catalan government within the new Spanish Republic, the first Statute of Autonomy of Catalonia was approved by the Spanish Parliament in September 1932, recognizing Catalan self-government and establishing a separate Parliament of Catalonia as the legislative body of the Generalitat, being elected on 20 November 1932. This first legislature was control by the Republican Left of Catalonia (Esquerra Republicana de Catalunya, ERC), which won the absolute majority of seats, while the conservative Regionalist League, almost hegemonic in Catalonia during the reign of Alfonso XIII, reached the second place but far from the Republican Left. Lluís Companys was appointed the first speaker of the Parliament. The Parliament appointed the ERC leader, Francesc Macià, as president of the Generalitat and, right after the election, the institution began to pass progressive legislation in different areas, such as health, culture and civil law, however, the institution was suspended between 1934 and 1936 when the Government of Catalonia attempted to create a Catalan State within a Spanish Federal Republic after, among other reasons, the rightward turn of the Republican government by its inclusion of CEDA ministers, self-proclaimed anti-Marxist and anti-democratic totalitarian traditionalists close to the European fascists, and the rejection by the Republican Court of Constitutional Guarantees (Constitutional Court of that time) of the emancipatory Crop Contracts Law land reform bill passed by the Parliament of Catalonia. The unilateral declaration of sovereignty lasted 10 hours.

The Parliament and the government were restored in February 1936 after the victory of Popular Front in the Spanish election, and abolished by the dictator Francisco Franco at the beginning of the occupation of Catalonia during the Spanish Civil War. The Parliament of Catalonia, like the rest of the institutions of the Generalitat, went to exile in 1939.

==== Re-establishment ====
After the death of Franco in 1975 and the subsequent first years of Spanish transition to democracy, claims by most of Catalan society and political spectrum, from communists to liberals, to restore self-government grew. The Generalitat came back from exile in 1977. In 1979, the new Statute of Autonomy of Catalonia recognized the restoration of the Parliament. The first legislature of the current Parliament of Catalonia was elected on 20 March 1980, 48 years after the first election in 1932. Convergència i Unió (CiU) a center-right Catalan nationalist electoral coalition won the plurality of seats, reaching 48 of 135 seats, and thus giving the presidency of the Generalitat to its leader Jordi Pujol, a position he would hold until 2003. That began a period of hegemony of CiU, which won the election of 1984 with an absolute majority (72 of 135).

== Election ==
The representatives of the Parliament of Catalonia are elected every four years after the date of its previous election, unless it is dissolved earlier, under a system of party-list proportional representation.

Since 1980, the 135 members of the Parliament of Catalonia are elected using the D'Hondt method and a closed list proportional representation, with a threshold of 3% of valid votes—which includes blank ballots—being applied in each constituency. Seats are allocated to constituencies, corresponding to the provinces of Barcelona, Tarragona, Girona and Lleida, with each being allocated 85, 18, 17 and 15 seats respectively.

In the 1932 election there were 85 seats up to election divided into five constituencies: the city of Barcelona proper and the provinces of Barcelona (excluding the city of Barcelona), Girona, Lleida and Tarragona, with each being allocated 24, 19, 14, 14 and 14 seats respectively. They were elected under the Republican system of plurality block voting or majoritari per districtes, with each voter casting a vote for 75% of its constituency seats. This in practice ensured that the winning bloc would always win three quarters of the votes (68 seats), thus ensuring a majority, with the second biggest bloc being awarded the remainder (17 seats). This system heavily punished minor parties, making it extremely difficult for them to gain representation.

== Historical membership ==
=== Republican period (1932–1939) ===
USC / PRA / PRDF / ERC / UC (Note: Its sole elected member was disavowed against running or politically representing the organization. He joined the ERC parliamentary group after the election despite personally always feeling a deputy of UC.) / PCR/ACR / League / UDC
1932	5 / 4 / 1 / 56 / 1 / 1 / 16 / 1

=== Since 1980 ===
PSUC / CUP / ICV / ICV–EUiA / CSQP / Comuns (Note: CatComú–Podem ECP–PEC Comuns Sumar) / ERC / PSA / PSC / JxSí / SI / JxCat / Junts / CDS / CiU / Cs / CC–UCD / PP / AC / Vox
1980	25 / 2 / 14 / 33 / 43 / 18
1984	6 / 5 / 41 / 72 / 11
1988	9 / 6 / 42 / 3 / 69 / 6
1992	7 / 11 / 40 / 70 / 7
1995	11 / 13 / 34 / 60 / 17
1999	3 / 12 / 52 / 56 / 12
2003	9 / 23 / 42 / 46 / 15
2006	12 / 21 / 37 / 48 / 3 / 14
2010	10 / 10 / 28 / 4 / 62 / 3 / 18
2012	3 / 13 / 21 / 20 / 50 / 9 / 19
2015	10 / 11 / 62 / 16 / 25 / 11
2017	4 / 8 / 32 / 17 / 34 / 36 / 4
2021	9 / 8 / 33 / 33 / 32 / 6 / 3 / 11
2024	4 / 6 / 20 / 42 / 35 / 15 / 2 / 11

== Leadership ==
The Parliament of Catalonia's Leadership resides in the Bureau of the Parliament comprising a President (Speaker), two Vice Presidents who chair debate when the President is absent, and four Secretaries, elected in the first session of each newly elected Parliament. The Bureau is tasked with managing the Parliament schedule and interpreting its rules of order, including the power to expel members from the sessions.

Composition of the Bureau of the Parliament of Catalonia for the 15th Parliament of Catalonia
Position	Name	Party
President (Speaker)	Josep Rull i Andreu	Junts
1st Vice President	Raquel Sans Guerra	ERC
2nd Vice President	David Pérez Ibáñez	PSC
1st Secretary	Glòria Freixa i Vilardell	Junts
2nd Secretary	Juli Fernàndez Olivares	ERC
3rd Secretary	Rosa Maria Ibarra Ollé	PSC
4th Secretary	Judit Alcalá González	PSC

There is also a second, consultative body, the Spokespersons' Council (Catalan: Junta de Portaveus, Spanish: Junta de Portavoces, Aranese: Conselh de Pòrtavotzes), which is made up of the leaders and spokespersons from each parliamentary group in the Parliament and has the right to be "heard" before the Bureau takes some decisions such as scheduling debates and votes. In the Spanish system, however, ruling parties usually do not hold a tight grip over the Parliament's schedule, nor do they use it to turn down the opposition proposals without debate: they are just voted down in committee or by the full house after the shortest debate allowed by the rules of order. Thus, while control of the Bureau and the Spokespersons' Council is definitely important, it is not a critical matter as it sometimes becomes in other systems.

== Functions ==
The definition and functions of the Parliament of Catalonia are defined by the Title II, Chapter I of the Statute of Autonomy. According to the Statute, the Parliament:

- Appoints the President of the Generalitat de Catalunya.
- Pass the Catalan legislation in the business of its competence.
- Pass the Budget of the Autonomous Community of Catalonia.
- Controls the action of the Government of Catalonia and the autonomous agencies, public companies and all other bodies answerable to it.
- Appoints the Síndic de Greuges (ombudsman).
- Appoints eight senators who represent Catalonia in the Senate of Spain.
- Elaborates bills to present them to the Bureau of the Congress of Deputies and appoints the representatives of the Parliament in charge of defending them.
- Requests the adoption of bills from the Government of Spain.
- Requests to the State the transfer or delegation of powers and the attribution of powers within the framework of article 150 of the Constitution.
- Appeals of unconstitutionality before the Constitutional Court and in other constitutional proceedings, in accordance with the provisions of the Organic Law of the Constitutional Court.
- Carry out other functions attributed to it by the Statute of Autonomy and the laws.

== Building ==
The official home of Parliament is the Palace of the Parliament of Catalonia (Palau del Parlament de Catalunya in Catalan). It is located in the Parc de la Ciutadella of the capital city, Barcelona. The main entrance is at number 1 of Joan Fiveller Square.

The building was designed by the Flemish architect Jorge Próspero de Verboom between 1716 and 1748 to serve as an arsenal, in the fortress of the Citadel that King Philip V had built, shortly after having conquered the city of Barcelona, on 11 September 1714. After the destruction of the Citadel, in 1868, the old arsenal was converted into a palace by the architect Pere Falqués, in order to receive the royal family during the 1888 Barcelona Universal Exposition. In 1900, the building became the Local Museum of Decorative and Archaeological Arts (Museo Municipal de Arte Decorativo y Arqueológico in Spanish).

In 1932, after the proclamation of the Second Spanish Republic and the grant of self-government to Catalonia, the building was chosen by the newly created Catalan Parliament. The building was renovated by the decorator Santiago Marco, transforming the throne room into the session chamber, and on the facade the Bourbon coat of arms was replaced by the Blazon of Catalonia. The inaugural session was held on 6 December 1932. After the Civil War, the building became a military barracks and in 1945, the seat of the Museum of Modern Art of Barcelona.

In 1977, during the Spanish transition to democracy, the building temporarily served as the Assembly of Parliamentarians (Catalan: Assemblea de Parlamentaris) until the restitution of Catalan self-government. In 1979 it became the seat of Parliament again and was renovated. Finally, the Museum of Modern Art was transferred in 2004 to the National Palace of Montjuïc, the new headquarters of the National Art Museum of Catalonia. Since then, the palace has been used exclusively for parliamentary purposes.

It is now listed as a Cultural Asset of Local Interest (Bé cultural d'interès local in Catalan) in the Inventory of Catalan Cultural Heritage, with the number 08019/125.

== Gallery ==
Parliament of Catalonia gallery

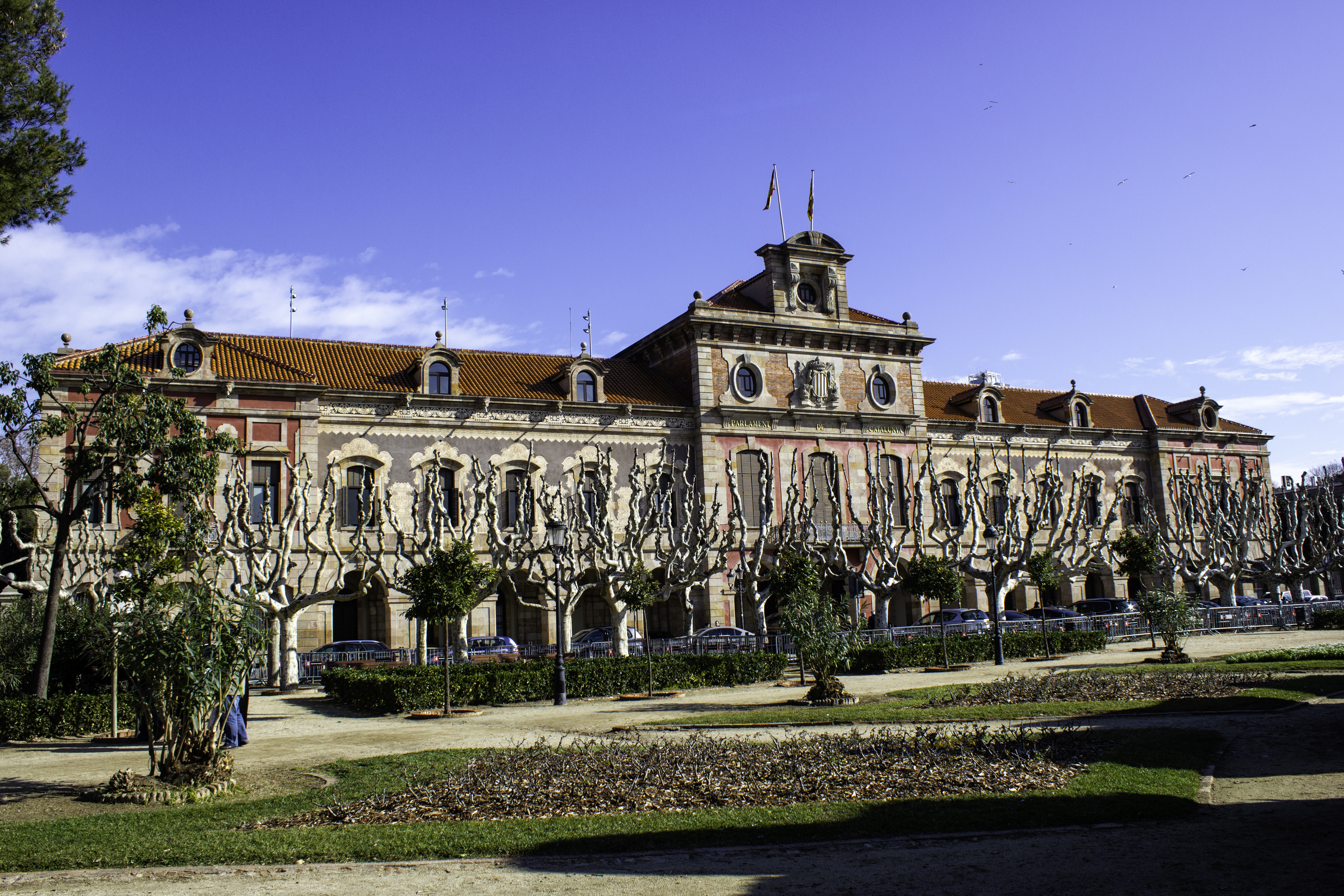
Facade of the Palace of Parliament

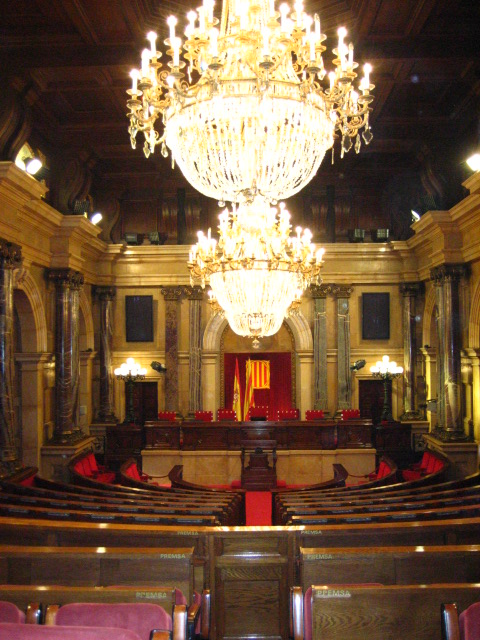
Session chamber of the Palace of Parliament

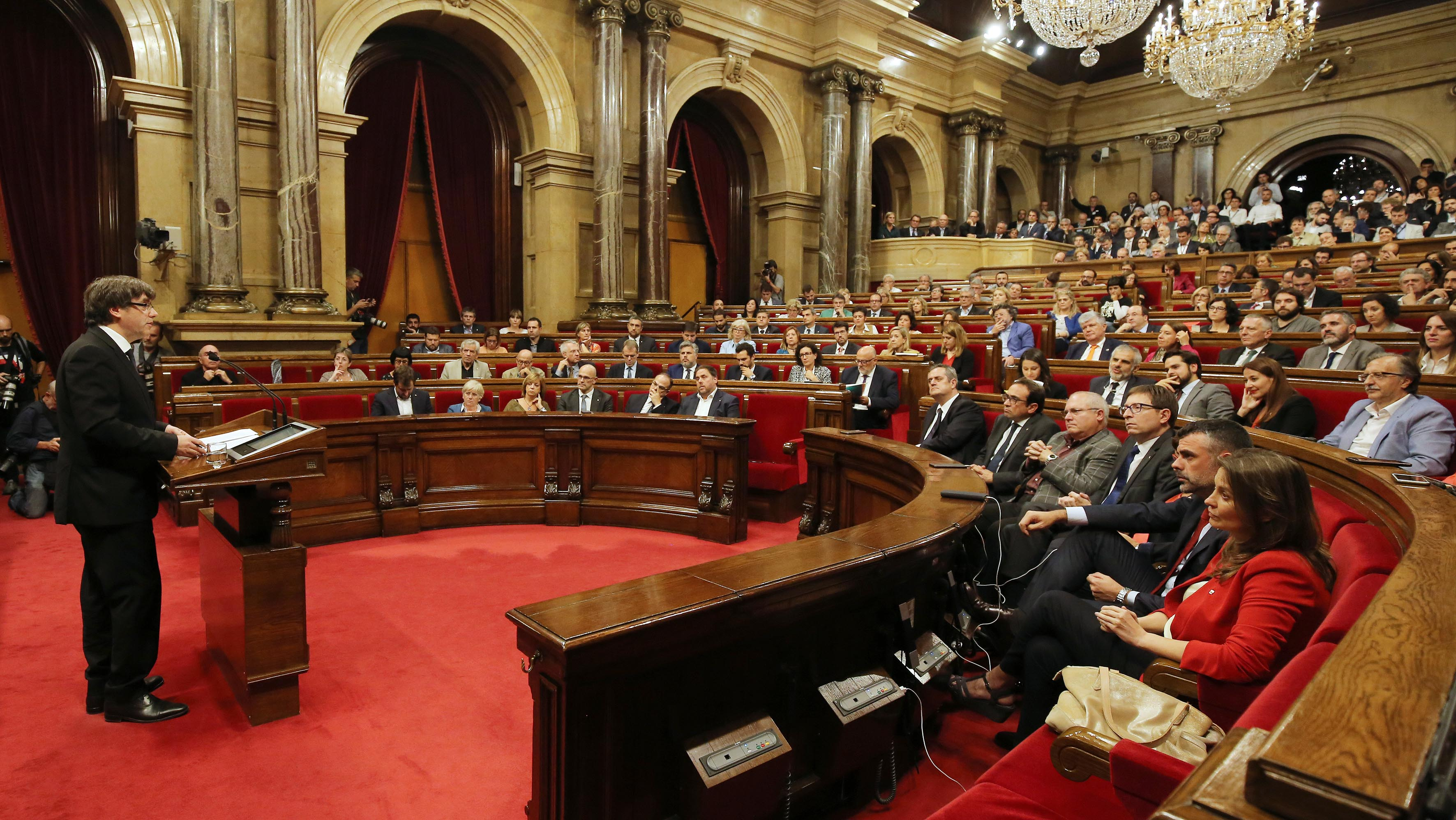
Catalan expresident Carles Puigdemont gives a speech at the Parliament of Catalonia on 10 October 2017

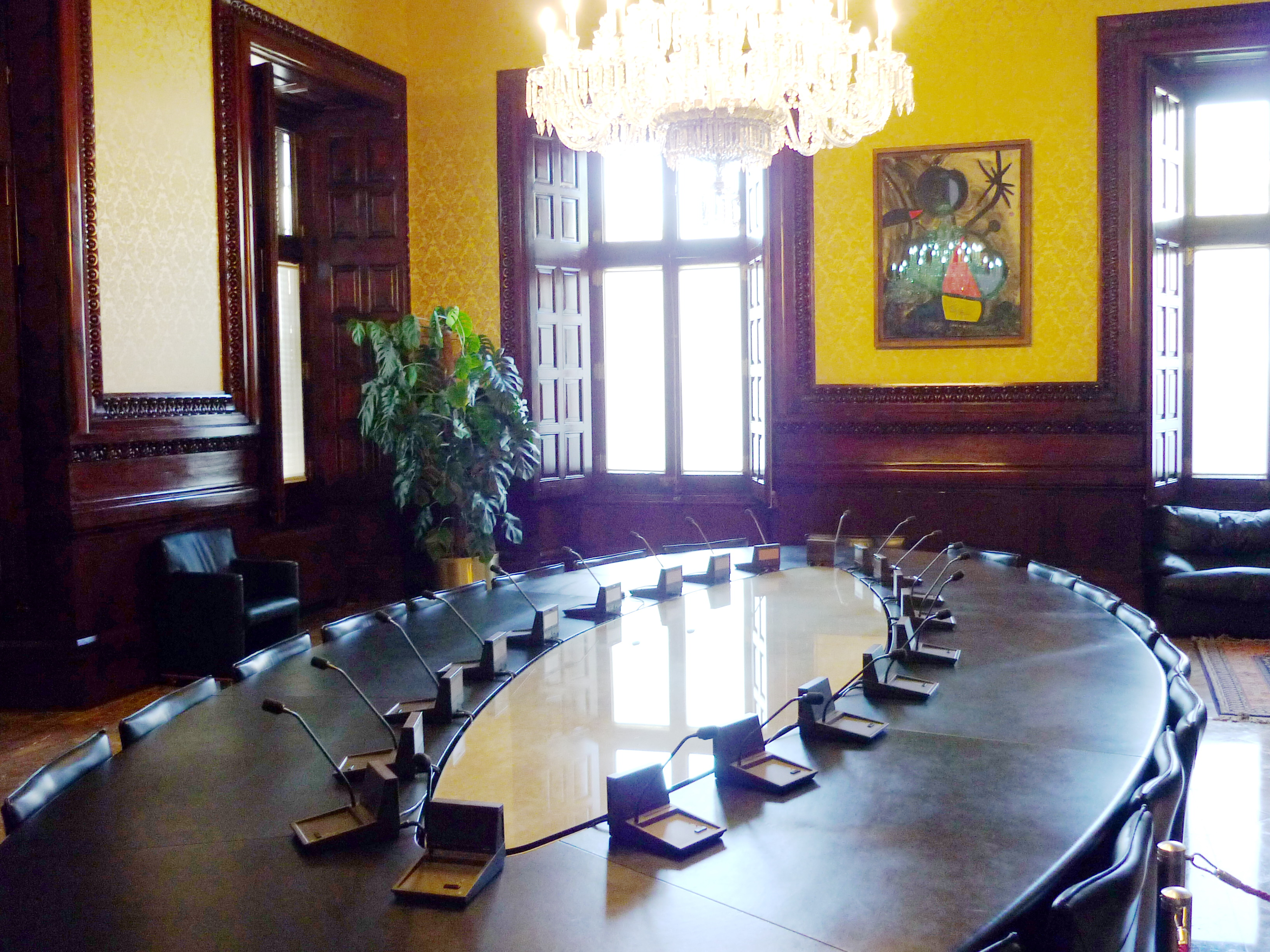
Meeting room of the Bureau of the Parliament of Catalonia

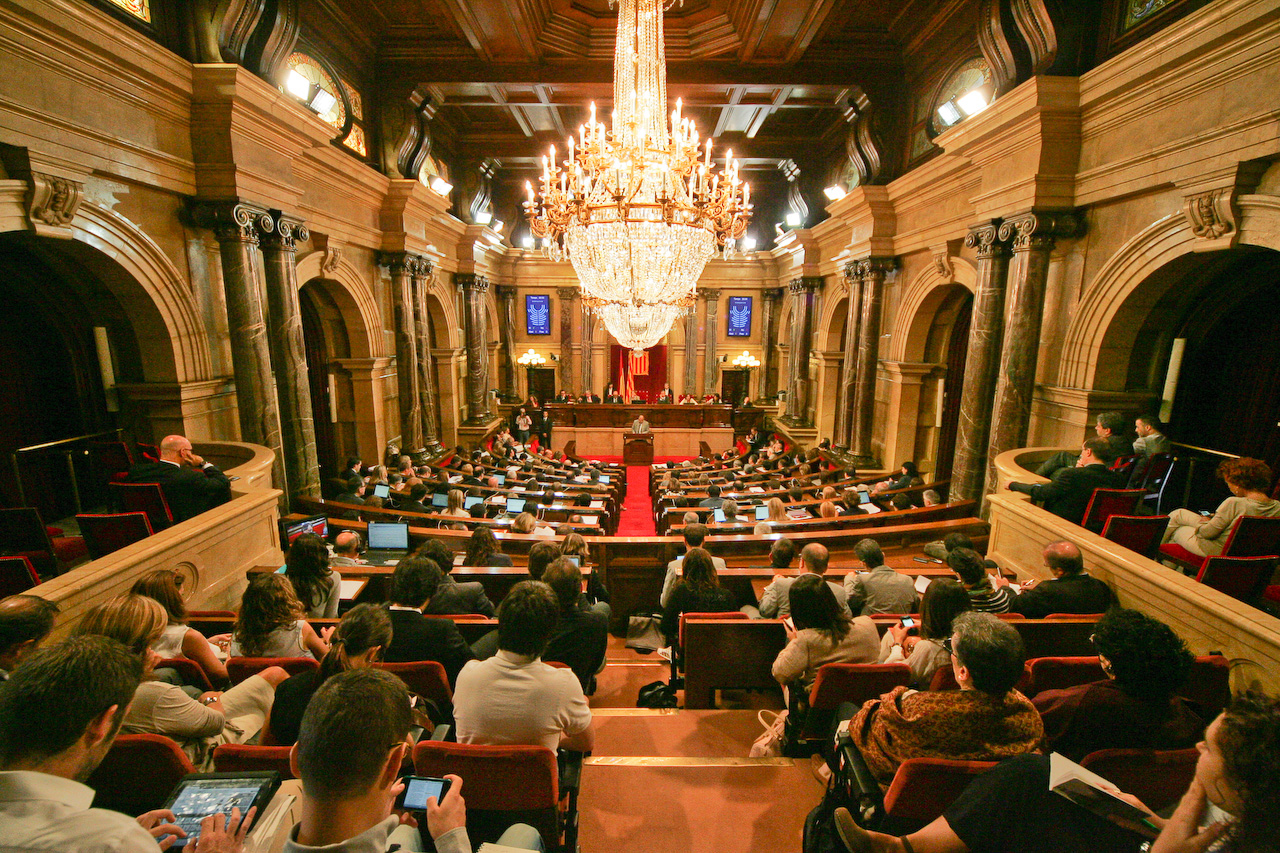
Debate on the general political orientation of the Government or debat de política general

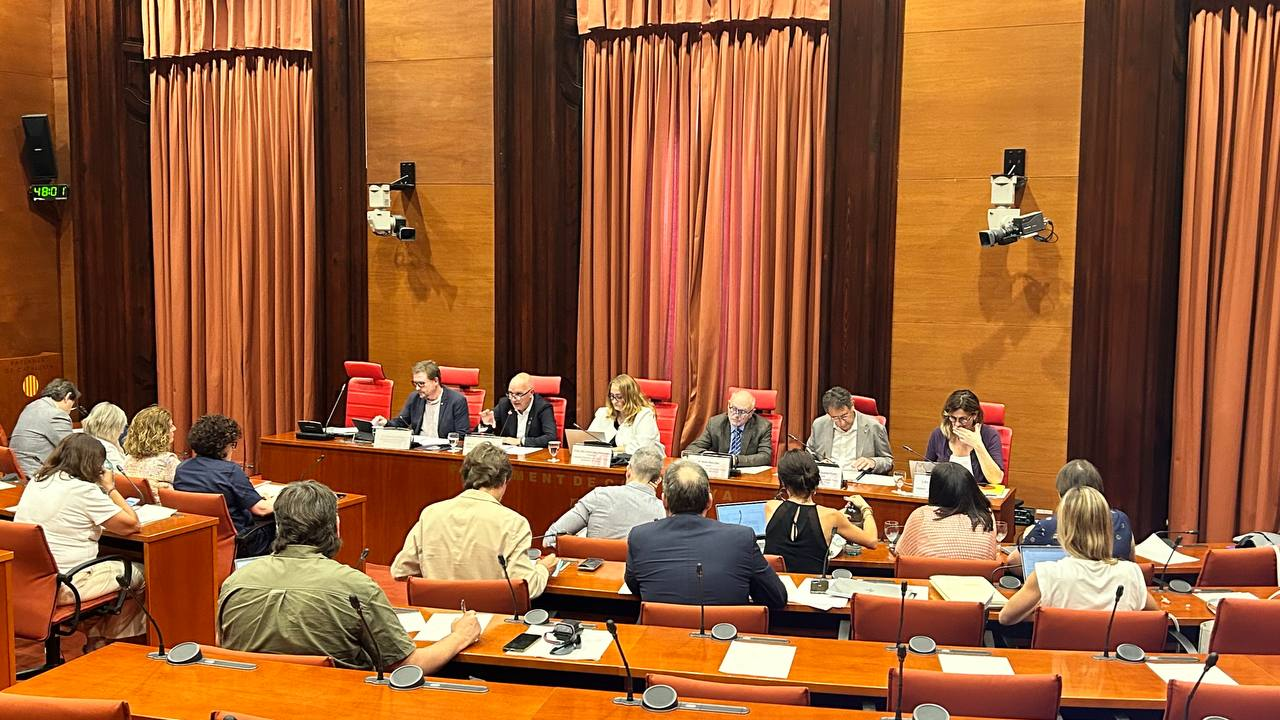
Parliamentary committee on Agriculture, Livestock Farming, Food and the Rural World in session

== See also ==
- List of presidents of the Parliament of Catalonia

== Bibliography ==
- Morales Montoya, Mercè (2012): El Parlament de Catalunya: república, guerra Civil i exili, Barcelona. Base, 2012.
