= Anna Punsoda =

Catalan journalist, author and politician

- Born: 1985 (age 40–41); Els Plans de Sió, Catalonia, Spain
- Occupations: Journalist, author and politician
- Political party: Alhora (since 2024)

Anna Punsoda i Ricart (born in 1985) is a Catalan journalist, novelist, essayist, translator and politician.

She is the author of several books and is the translator of seven German-language works published in Catalan.

In 2024, she was a founding member of the new pro-independence political party Alhora, and was presented as a candidate for the party at the elections of the same year.

== Early life and literary career ==
Punsoda was born in Els Plans de Sió, on the plain of Segarra in central Catalonia, before moving to Lleida where she grew up. She received a degree in Journalism from Ramon Llull University and Philosophy from the University of Barcelona (UB). As part of a Master's degree in Contemporary Thought and Classical Tradition at UB, she produced a thesis on the social and political thought of Joan Maragall, eventually resulting in a published anthology of Maragall's texts. She later moved to Germany, living in the cities of Dresden, Leibzig and Hamburg, where she worked as a translator.

Her journalistic work has focused on cultural topics, and she has contributed to a range of media outlets including newspapers El País, Ara, Nació Digital, El Núvol, La Mira and El Temps, as well as appearing on radio stations Catalunya Ràdio and RAC1. In 2017 she was involved in the creation of La Llança, the cultural supplement of El Nacional, and she has been the editor of Diagonal magazine since 2020.

Her 2018 debut novel, Els llits dels altres, won the Roc Boronat prize for that year. The novel was translated into English by Mara Faye Lethem and published in 2022. La luxúria (2020) was an extended essay on lust, while La terra dura (2023) explored her relationship to the rural Catalan environment of her youth.

== Political career ==
In 2024, Punsoda became a founding member of big-tent, pro-independence Catalan political party Alhora, and was placed second-in-command on the 14-member national council charged with directing the party's activities.

Punsoda was put forward as the 3rd placed candidate on the party's list for the 2024 Catalan elections, after Clara Ponsatí and Jordi Graupera, although she was not elected as the party failed to gain a single seat.

== Published works ==
- Llum als ulls i força al braç (Light in the Eyes and Strength in the Arms). (La Magrana, 2013) Anthology of texts by Joan Maragall
- Els llits dels altres (Amsterdam Llibres, 2018), ISBN 978-84-16743-78-0. English translation: Other People's Beds (Mara Faye Lethem, trans.) (Fum D'Estampa Press, 2022)
- La luxúria (Lust) (Fragmenta, 2020). Essay ISBN 978-84-17796-26-6
- La terra dura. Retorn al cor de Catalunya (Hard Earth: Return to the Heart of Catalonia) (Pòrtic Edicions, 2023). ISBN 978-84-9809-549-4

=== Translations ===
- Stefanie Kremser, Der Tag, an dem ich fliegen lernte, Kiepenheuer und Witsch Verlag 2014. Translated into Catalan as El dia que vaig aprendre a volar by Anna Punsoda. Edicions de 1984 (2016)
- Rainer Maria Rilke, Briefe an einen jungen Dichter. Translated into Catalan as Cartes a un jove poeta by Anna Punsoda. Edicions de la ela geminada (2018)
- Raimon Panikkar, Meinen Wir denselben Gott?. Translated into Catalan as ¿Parlem del mateix Déu?: Un diàleg by Anna Punsoda. Fragmenta Editorial (2018)
- Franz Kafka, Kleine Erzählungen. Translated into Catalan as Petites faules. Selection, translation and prologue by Anna Punsoda. Comanegra (2019)
- Charlotte Beradt, Das Dritte Reich des Traums. Translated into Catalan as El Tercer Reich dels somnis. Translation of the book and second epilogue by Anna Punsoda. Ara Llibres (2020)
- Franz Kafka, In der Strafkolonie. Translated into Catalan as A la colònia penitenciària. Translation and afterword by Anna Punsoda. Edicions de la Ela Geminada (2020)
- Lou Andreas-Salomé. Die Erotik. Translated into Catalan as L'erotisme. Translation and prologue by Anna Punsoda. Edicions de la Ela Geminada (2022)
