= Antoni Comín =

Catalan politician (born 1971)

Toni Comín MEP
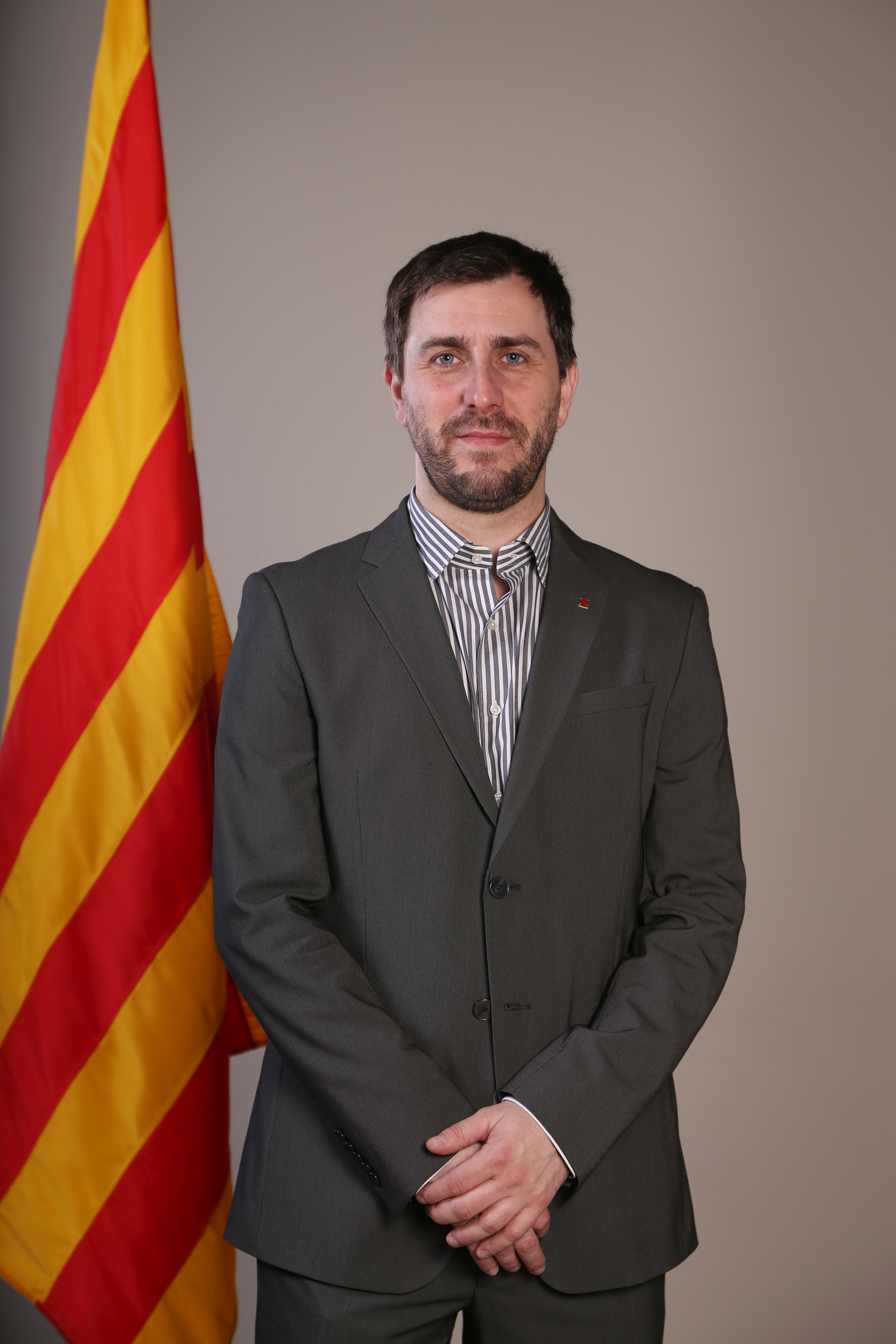
- Official portrait, 2016

Member of the European Parliament for Spain
- Incumbent
- Assumed office 22 October 2026
- In office 2 July 2019 – 15 July 2024

Minister of Health of Catalonia
- In office 14 January 2016 – 27 October 2017
- President: Carles Puigdemont
- Preceded by: Boi Ruiz
- Succeeded by: Alba Vergés (Direct rule until 2 June 2018)

Vice President of the Council for the Republic
- Incumbent
- Assumed office 8 December 2018
- President: Carles Puigdemont
- Preceded by: Office established

Member of the Parliament of Catalonia
- In office 26 October 2015 – 30 July 2018
- Constituency: Barcelona
- In office 28 June 2004 – 5 October 2010
- Constituency: Barcelona

Personal details
- Born: Antoni Comín i Oliveres; March 7, 1971 (age 55) Barcelona, Catalonia, Spain
- Citizenship: Spain
- Party: MESCat (since 2025)
- Other political affiliations: PSC (2003–2014); ERC (2015–2017); Junts (2020–2025)
- Domestic partner: Sergi Corbera
- Children: 1
- Parent: Alfonso Carlos Comín (father)
- Relatives: Jesús Comín Sagüés (grandfather)
- Alma mater: Autonomous University of Barcelona
- Occupation: Professor • Politician

Antoni "Toni" Comín i Oliveres (Catalan pronunciation: [ənˈtɔni kuˈmin]; born 7 March 1971) is a Catalan intellectual and politician from Spain. He is currently the executive vice-president of the Council for the Republic and was an MEP from July 2019 to July 2024. He is the fourth child of the politician and intellectual Alfonso Carlos Comín i Ros and Maria Lluïsa Oliveres i Sanvicens, whose other children are Maria, Pere and Betona. He is the partner of the stage designer Sergi Corbera, and they have a daughter called Laia.

He completed his primary, secondary and baccalaureate education at the Santa Ana school in Barcelona and he also studied music, specialising in piano, up to advanced level at the School of Music of Barcelona. He graduated in arts and politics from the Autonomous University of Barcelona in 1996 and was awarded a Robert Schuman Traineeship for work placement at the European Parliament headquarters in Luxembourg. He went on to study his postgraduate in Humanities at the Universitat Pompeu Fabra, where he postgraduated.

He embarked upon his professional teaching career at the Sacred Heart School in Barcelona, and between 1998 and 2017 he lectured in the Social Philosophy Department of Esade (Universitat Ramon Llull).

== Life and career ==
Comín was born in Barcelona. His family has been involved in politics since the 19th century. His father, Alfonso Carlos Comín, was a member of the Communist PSUC. However, his grandfather, Jesús Comín Sagüés, was a Carlist MP during the Second Spanish Republic and contributed to the victory of Francisco Franco in the Spanish Civil War. The ancestors of Jesús Comín had also been prominent figures in the Carlist movement. Comín has a degree in philosophy and political sciences from the Autonomous University of Barcelona, is a professor of social sciences at ESADE (University Ramon Llull), and member of the Foundation Alfonso Comín and of the Center for the Study of Christianity & Justice. He writes periodically for The Ciervo magazine, for El Mundo and participates in the morning radio talk-show program on RAC 1 "El perquè de tot plegat".

=== Entering politics ===
Antoni Comín i Oliveres is a member of the Fundació Alfonso Comín. The figure of Alfonso Comín, one of the most esteemed and charismatic leaders of the democratic opposition to Franco's dictatorship, is essential to understanding the intellectual and political career of his son, Antoni Comín. Alfonso Comín represented the Christian left during the fight against Franco's dictatorship and in the early years of the transition in Spain. Alfonso Comín was a staunch defender of the values of equality, social justice and Catalan nationalism, and also harboured deep Christian convictions. He was also one of the most influential figures in the political thought of Antoni Comín.

Although his political concerns come from many years back – always in the orbit of left-wing and pro-Catalan political forces – Antoni's most active militancy period began through his participation in the Alter-globalization movement born of the World Social Forum.

Between 2003 and 2011, he was part of the progressive, Republican and federal political movement spearheaded by Pasqual Maragall, Citizens for Change, which brought together sectors of the pro-Catalan left wing, beyond any political affiliation, and which also ran for the elections to the Parliament of Catalonia in coalition with the Socialist Party of Catalonia (PSC).

=== Member of the Parliament of Catalonia ===
Toni Comín was elected to the Catalan Parliament in the 2003 elections as part of the Ciutadans pel Canvi-PSC candidacy. In the course of this first period of office as an MP, he was the secretary of the Institutional Affairs Commission, in which he played a prominent role in the drafting of the new Statute of Autonomy of Catalonia, which was ratified in the 2006 Referendum. He was also actively involved in the policies implemented to promote the social economy and cooperativism of the Government of Catalonia, and also chaired the Interdepartmental Commission tasked with designing and managing the Minimum Integration Income.

He was re-elected MP in the 2006 elections and was appointed president of the Petitions Commission, spokesperson for the Cooperation and Solidarity Commission and Assistant Spokesperson on the Economy Commission, which dealt with fiscal matters. In the course of this mandate, he participated actively in the reform of the Inheritance Tax.

That same year, he took charge of the political coordination of Ciutadans pel Canvi, eventually leading the Popular Legislative Initiative for a new Election Law of Catalonia, the “Via Federal” campaign, which tabled, for the first time ever in the domain of pro-Catalan socialism, the need for a constitutional reform acknowledging Catalonia's right to self-determination. He was also involved in the campaign in favour of the Minimum Integration Income.

In the course of that period, Antoni Comín was appointed vice-president of the Fundació Catalunya Segle XXI, where he coordinated the “Consulta per la Justícia Global” (Consultation for Global Justice) project that emerged from the “How to make globalisation fair” dialogue at the Universal Forum of Cultures of Barcelona in 2004. This project would subsequently give rise to the exhibition entitled: “Canvi de rumb. 9 condicions per a un món sense pobresa” (A change of direction. 9 conditions for a poverty-free world), which he curated and which was held in the Castle of Montjuïc, in 2010; in the Modernist Area of Sant Pau in 2011-2012 and in the Centre Cultural Fundació Caixa de Terrassa in 2013.

During that period, he also coordinated and promoted the Seminar on “Economic Democracy” sponsored by the Federació de Cooperatives de Treball de Catalunya.

=== Evolution towards pro-independence ===
Following the ruling of the Constitutional Court of 2010 on the Statute of Catalonia and its political consequences, in December 2013, he and other members of the Socialist Party who were critical of the Party's departure from its pro-Catalan tradition created a new movement Socialisme, Catalunya i Llibertat [Socialism, Catalonia and Freedom]. As of that moment he became increasingly closer to the pro-independence movement and to ERC, which took material form in 2015 when he entered the electoral lists of the pro-Independence candidacy of Junts pel Sí [Together for Yes] for the elections to the Parliament of Catalonia through ERC.

=== Minister of the Government of Catalonia ===
On 13 January 2016, the president elect of the Government of Catalonia, Carles Puigdemont, appointed him Minister of Health of the Government of Catalonia. At the Department of Health, his priorities were:

- to reverse the budget cutbacks implemented in the health system during the Great Recession,
- reduce the waiting lists for surgery and visits to specialists,
- improve the casualties and emergency care system,
- promote mental health care policies based on a community paradigm,
- back out of the agreements reached with profit-based private hospitals,
- promote structural and continual reform in Primary Care,
- place the fight against inequality in health at the centre of all policies,
- bolster the Public Health System and promote the health strategy in all policies,
- foster job stability for healthcare professionals,
- recover the healthcare infrastructure investment policy (with particular emphasis on the comprehensive renewal of Catalonia's two largest hospitals, the Vall d’Hebron and the Hospital Clínic),
- and transform the prevailing healthcare model to include specific groups (transsexuals, fibromyalgia patients, in vitro fertilisation for lesbians, etc.), among others.

=== October 1, 2017 Referendum ===
The Catalan independence referendum was held on 1 October 2017, despite warnings from the Spanish Justice System that it was unconstitutional. Previously, until that date, several legal proceedings had been broken at the Catalonian Parliament, depriving non-separatists political groups of their rights as members of the Parliament. Like the other members of the government, he was removed from his position of Autonomous Minister of Health from the Government of Catalonia by the Spanish Government through the enforcement of article 155 of the Spanish Constitution of 27 October 2017. On 30 October, he was forced into exile to Brussels, together with president Carles Puigdemont and another three members of the government, Clara Ponsatí, Lluís Puig and Meritxell Serret.

=== Escape from Spain ===
Antoni Comín i Oliveres and other members of the Catalan government escaped the day after having unilaterally and illegally proclaimed the independence of Catalonia, and remained in Belgium to avoid being prosecuted by Spanish Justice. The National Criminal Court of Spain issued its first European Arrest Warrant on 3 November.

In the meantime, Antoni Comín had already taken up residence in the historic university city of Leuven. The Belgian judge announced he would issue his ruling on the extradition on 14 December, although judge Llarena of the Spanish Supreme Court decided to withdraw the European Arrest Warrant when he realised that the Belgian Courts were unlikely to grant extradition.

On 7 December, more than 100,000 Catalans flooded the streets of Brussels’ European Quarter in the demonstration organised by Òmnium and the ANC under the slogan “Wake up, Europe!”, a turnout that exceeded all expectations.

In the elections of 21 December, the Catalan pro-Independence movement maintained its majority in the Parliament of Catalonia and Toni Comín was elected as an MP in the ERC list. For the first time in history, a separatist majority in parliament would agree to keep seats vacant for absented MP elect during the entire term of office, even though it is mandatory to swear and take up the post physically and he had not attended precisely because he fled to Belgium to avoid being prosecuted.

On 22 March 2018, judge Llarena of the Supreme Court issued the second European Arrest Warrant against the charged members of the Catalan Government, which was also rejected by the Belgian judge one year later on 16 May 2018. The Belgian judge expressly rejected the extradition on account of a formal defect. The CJEU ruled in 2016, "The European arrest warrant must be based on a national arrest warrant."

On 12 July, despite the fact that Carles Puidemont was charged for rebellion, sedition and misuse of public funds, the court of Schleswig-Holstein (Germany) rejected the extradition of Carles Puigdemont for rebellion. They authorised extradition on the grounds of misuse of public funds, which the Spanish Court rejected.

==== The fight for the seat ====
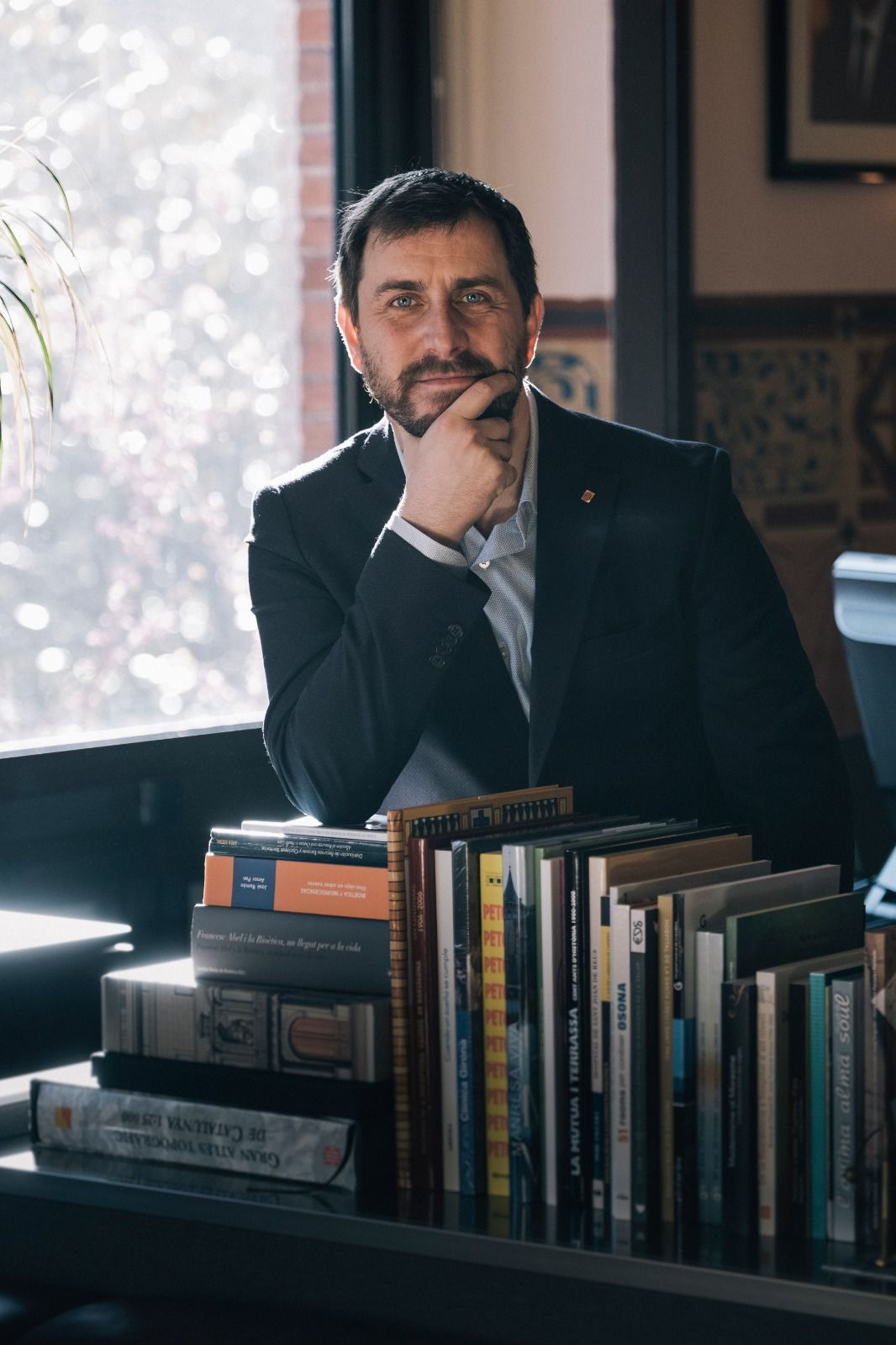
Antoni Comín and Oliveres in Leuven, at an interview with Diario de Navarra, 2020.

The elections to the European Parliament in 2019 heralded yet another tour de force with the Spanish Legal Authorities, who did their utmost to prevent the escape, Carles Puigdemont, Antoni Comín i Oliveres and Clara Ponsatí, from becoming MEPs. First of all, the Junta Electoral Central (Electoral Commission) removed them from the "Lliures per Europa" (Free for Europe) coalition electoral list after the People's Party and Citizens parties challenged their candidacy on the grounds of their legal circumstances.

An appeal was lodged with the Contentious Room of the Supreme Court, whose response argued that Puigdemont, Ponsatí and Comín were “entitled to stand” in the European elections.

Finally, on 26 May, in the European elections, the list of Junts i Lliures per Europa of president Puigdemont prevailed in Catalonia, obtaining almost one million votes, giving it 2 seats. Antoni Comín was second on the list and therefore became an MEP elect.

Following their election, the Electoral Commission refused to allow them to swear loyalty to the Spanish Constitution from Belgium, thus preventing them from taking up their seat at the beginning of their term of office. Both Carles Puigdemont and Toni Comín consequently lodged an appeal with the Court of Justice of the European Union which rejected outright the thesis of the Spanish Supreme Court on 19 September 2019. Therefore, six months after they had been elected, Antoni Comín i Oliveres and President Carles Puigdemont finally took possession of their seats in the European Parliament.

In the meantime, on 14 October, judge Llarena issued a third European Arrest warrant against Carles Puigdemont and Antoni Comín for the offences of rebellion and misappropriation of public funds, hours after the Supreme Court had announced its ruling sentencing the nine leaders of the procés to between 9 and 13 years of imprisonment. However, on 2 January 2020, the Belgian courts suspended the proceedings pertaining to the decision on whether or not they would be handed over to Spain after ascertaining that they enjoyed parliamentary immunity.

==== Parliament immunity ====
On 16 January 2021, the European Parliament announced the initiation of the rogatory letter against Carles Puigdemont, Antoni Comín and Clara Ponsatí (who would become an MEP following Brexit) in order to revoke their immunity as MEPs and thus be able to reactivate the European Arrest Warrant.

==== Parliament activity ====
In the European Parliament, Antoni Comín was a member of the Committees on Development and Humanitarian Assistance. He also sat on the Committee on the Environment, Public Health and Food Safety.

During his term of office, Antoni Comín was particularly active in calling for the lifting of the patents of the COVID-19 vaccines to accelerate the vaccination process in the countries of the South, as well as in matters related to the fight against climate change.

=== Council for the Republic ===
Antoni Comín i Oliveres has been the vice-president and executive director of the Council for the Republic since it was presented in the Saló de Sant Jordi on 30 October 2018. The council's mission is to remain actively in order to keep the pro-independence spirit alive so that they can assure their incomes. To this end, he has maintained its legitimacy and fought to bring this idea to fruition on a daily basis. The council, based in Belgium, engages in disseminating the pro-Independence cause all over the world. It is regarded as the embryo of the institutions of the Catalan Republic, which was proclaimed in October 2017.

On 29 February 2020, the Council staged a mass event in the Exhibition Park in Perpignan, with a turnout of more than 150,000 people, the most important political concentration ever organised in France.

=== Collaboration with the media ===
Throughout his professional career, Antoni Comín has collaborated regularly with the mass media, particularly the printed press and the radio, through articles, talks and different collaborations in the course of which he has shared his insights and his view of current affairs over the last decades in Catalonia, Spain, Europe and the world.

In 1993, he joined the editorial board of the El Ciervo Journal – one of whose founders was his father, Alfonso Comín – where he worked and published articles regularly for more than 20 years until 2015.

He was also a regular contributor to the La República weekly, publishing articles in it between 2018 and 2020. Before that, he had also published regularly for several years, first in El Mundo – Catalonia and subsequently in the ARA daily. In the course of his professional career, he has published articles in many other printed media, including dailies, magazines and journals, such as El País, El Periódico, El Punt Avui, Iglesia Viva or Quaderns de Cristianisme i Justícia, to name but some.

He has also enjoyed a constant presence in the different audiovisual media in Catalonia. His first collaboration was with the “Postres de Music” programme on Catalunya Ràdio in 1998, and he went on to feature regularly on other political talk-shows on the same station, as well as other programmes on Barcelona Televisió, COM Ràdio and the night-time talk-show on RAC-1. He was also a guest on the leading morning radio talk show in Catalonia, El perquè de tot plegat on RAC1, for five years.

== Works ==
- El sentido político de la marginación (Sal Terrae, 1996)
- "Emmanuel Mounier" (10 pensadors cristians del segle XX, 1997)
- Els canvis són possibles (1998)
- La igualtat, una fita pendent. Cristianisme i Justícia. (1999)
- La mundialización: aspectos políticos, a ¿Mundialización o conquista? (1999)
- La unidad perdida del ser y el pensar (2000)
- Emmanuel Mounier, el seu impacte en el pensament polític (Diálegs, 2001)
- "Política e interioridad" (a La interioridad, un paradigma emergente, 2002)
- Los cambios son posibles (2002)
- Globalizar la política para democratizar la economía, a Mundo global, justicia parcial (2003)
- Autoritat mundial. Per a un lideratge planetari legítim. Cristianisme i Justícia. (2005)
- Federalismo de la diversidad, en nombre de la igualdad (a Hacia una España plural, social y federal, 2005)
- Cuando llueve, sin duda hace falta un paraguas (a Sobre el presente y el futuro del sindicalismo, 2006)
- A fronte del dogmatismo, un elogio della critica, non del relativismo (2006)
- Governabilitat democràtica global: Proposta d'organització institucional (2007)
- "Europa dividida" (a Món dividit, 2007)
- Les paraules del socialisme (2008)
- Democràcia Econòmica. Cap a una alternativa al capitalisme (2009)
- "Notas (intempestivas) sobre el liberalismo" (a Liberalismo vs Socialdemocracia, 2010)
