= Alhora =

- President: Jordi Graupera
- Vice president: Júlia Ojeda
- Founders: Jordi Graupera; Clara Ponsatí
- Founded: 23 April 2024
- Headquarters: Barcelona
- Ideology: Catalan independence; Eco-nationalism
- Political position: Big tent
- Colors: Raspberry; Aquamarine
- Parliament of Catalonia: 0 / 135

Website
- alhora.cat

Alhora (lit. 'At the same time / At once') is a Catalan political party that was founded by Jordi Graupera and Clara Ponsatí with the intention of running in the 2024 Catalan regional election. The party "welcomes people from the pro-independence left to liberal Catalanism" with the aim to work for "the independence of Catalonia".

While the party defines itself as above the left-right divide and includes prominent politicians formerly belonging to both the centre-right Junts and centre-left ERC, some commentators have suggested that the project should be seen as an outgrowth of the Catalan pro-independence right.

The party's main points include a move from overtourism towards a quality economy that prevents brain drain, guarantees and protections towards Catalan from diglossia and language death through a dual education system akin to the Basque Country's to keep it as the main language of communication, integrating immigration into Catalan identity, and a green energy transition, among others.

== History ==
At the beginning of March 2024, Jordi Graupera and Clara Ponsatí announced that they planned to launch a new, pro-independence "political space" within the Catalan political landscape. While eschewing the traditional language of a political party, they nonetheless announced their intention to run in the upcoming elections to the Parliament of Catalonia, which were at the time scheduled for February 2025.

Catalan President Pere Aragonès' early calling of elections for 12 May 2024 accelerated the process of the party's creation and electoral registration. The press conference presenting Alhora's proposal was held by Clara Ponsatí, Jordi Graupera, Ada Ferrer and Anna Punsoda, the group representing the new party.

To be able to stand in the elections, they needed 5,703 signatures in total across all four Catalan provinces: 4,243 in Barcelona, 596 in Tarragona, 546 in Girona and 317 in Lleida. Graupera and Ponsatí asked for volunteers for the signature collection process. On 2 April 2024, they confirmed that they had the necessary signatures.

The party received 0.44% of the votes overall in the 2024 elections, achieving no representation in Parliament.

Beginning in October 2024, Alhora launched a YouTube podcast hosted by Graupera intended to spotlight discussions of diverse topics of relevance to Catalan politics, inviting a range of guests with relevant expertise or experience regardless of party affiliation. As of November 2025, the channel had 4,000 subscribers and 1.3 million views.

=== 2026 Spanish General Election ===
In October 2026, with the intention of running in that year’s 2026 Spanish general election, the party secured 15,386 endorsements (11,668 in Barcelona, 1,796 in Girona, 1,281 in Tarragona, and 641 in Lleida). The Official State Gazette BOE published the list of confirmed candidacies on November 3. Alhora’s lists for the Congress of Deputies were headed by Jordi Graupera for the Barcelona electoral constituency (accompanied by Pilar Carracelas as the second candidate), Júlia Ojeda for the Girona, Cristina Casol for Lleida, and the writer Miquel Bonet for Tarragona.

On November 13, 2026, coinciding with the official start of the election campaign, the party unveiled the slogan "Fora Espanya" ("Out with Spain") and began putting up posters at the Barcelona-Sants station.

== Electoral performance ==
=== Parliament of Catalonia ===
Election	Leading candidate	Votes	%	Seats	+/–	Government
2024	Clara Ponsatí	14,104	0.45 (#11)	0 / 135	New	No seats
