= Council of the Republic =

Council of the Republic may refer to:

- Council of the Republics of the Supreme Soviet of the Soviet Union
- Council of the Republic of Belarus
- Council of the Republic (Russia)
- Council of the Republic of France, the name for the Senate of France during the French Fourth Republic
- Council of the Republic (Catalonia), an organisation promoting Catalan independence
- Council of the Republic (Brazil)
