= Graupera =

Graupera is a surname. Notable people with the surname include:

- José Raúl Capablanca y Graupera (1888–1942), Cuban chess player
- Jordi Graupera (born 1981), Spanish researcher
