= Clara Ponsatí =

Spanish economist

The Honourable Clara Ponsatí
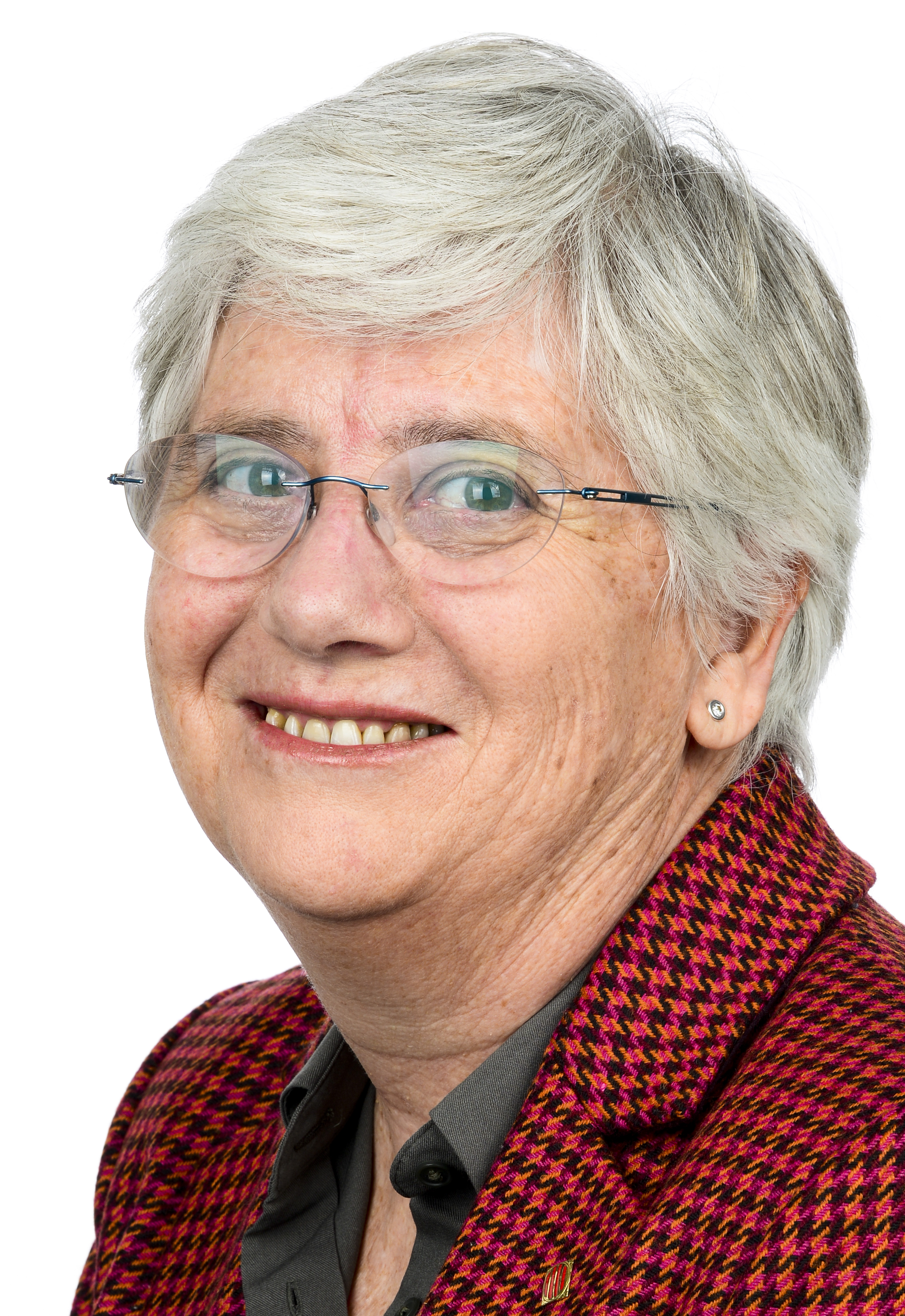

Counselor of Education of Catalonia
- In office 14 July 2017 – 28 October 2017
- President: Carles Puigdemont
- Preceded by: Meritxell Ruiz
- Succeeded by: Josep Bargalló (Direct rule until 2 June 2018)

Member of the Catalan Parliament
- In office 17 January 2018 – 29 January 2018

Member of the European Parliament
- In office 1 February 2020 – 16 July 2024
- Constituency: Spain

Personal details
- Born: 19 March 1957 (age 69) Barcelona, Catalonia, Spain
- Citizenship: Spain
- Party: Alhora (2024–present)
- Other political affiliations: Junts (2020–2024)
- Education: University of Barcelona; University of Minnesota
- Occupation: Economist, politician
- Website: https://www.claraponsati.cat/

Clara Ponsatí i Obiols (Catalan pronunciation: [ˈklaɾə punsəˈti]; born 19 March 1957) is a Catalan economist and politician. She was appointed Minister of Education of the Government of Catalonia by President Carles Puigdemont on 14 July 2017, and was dismissed by the Spanish Government pursuant to Article 155 of the Spanish Constitution on 27 October 2017, due to the organisation of the 2017 Catalan independence referendum and the subsequent declaration of independence. On 30 October 2017, she went into exile in Brussels together with Carles Puigdemont and three other members of his government, Lluís Puig, Antoni Comín and Meritxell Serret. In May 2018, she returned to the University of St Andrews (Scotland) as a professor. In the 2019 Spanish municipal elections, she was placed last on the list of the candidacy Barcelona és capital - Primàries, led by Jordi Graupera. From February 2020 to July 2024 she was a Member of the European Parliament within the Junts i Lliures per Europa grouping.

== Life and academic career ==
Clara Ponsatí was born in 1957 in Barcelona, Catalonia, daughter of Josep Maria Ponsatí i Capdevila and Montserrat Obiols i Germà. Her grandfather was the artist Josep Obiols i Palau, her uncle is the politician Raimon Obiols i Germà, and her sister is the Catalan philologist Agnès Ponsatí Obiols. She attended the Escola Talitha. In 1980, Ponsatí graduated in the Universitat de Barcelona's Faculty of Economics, and she completed a master's degree in economics in the Universitat Autònoma de Barcelona. In 1988 she received her Ph.D. in economics from the University of Minnesota, where she remained some years as a professor.

Ponsatí specializes in game theory and political economy, with a focus on models of bargaining and conflict resolution. In 2001, Ponsatí joined the Institute of Economic Analysis of the CSIC (Consejo Superior de Investigaciones Científicas) as a researcher and managed the institution from 2006 to 2012. She has also been visiting professor at the universities of Toronto, San Diego and Georgetown.

In 2013, she denounced that the Ministry of Education, Culture and Sport decided not to renew her position as visiting professor of the Prince of Asturias Chair at Georgetown University because of her favourable position on Catalan independence and the right to self-determination, which Ponsatí considered a manoeuvre of "censorship" against her political opinions. Her views on the relations between Catalonia and Spain caused the Spanish Foreign Affairs and Cooperation Minister, José Manuel García-Margallo, to state: "una cátedra en el extranjero no debe servir de base para alentar procesos secesionistas contrarios a la Constitución", (This chair abroad should not be used to encourage support to secession movements contrary to the Constitution), remarking: "mientras yo sea ministro no ocurrirá en ninguna embajada española" (As long as I'm the minister this will not occur in any Spanish embassy).

In January 2015, Ponsatí was appointed director of the School of Economics and Finance at the University of St Andrews in Scotland, her last academic post before her appointment, in July 2017, as Minister of Education of the Generalitat de Catalonia.

== Political activity ==
From mid-2016 to July 2017, she was a member of the National Secretariat of l'Assemblea Nacional Catalana, just before being appointed as Minister of Education in the remodelling of the Government of the Generalitat de Catalunya carried out by President Puigdemont. From her Ministry, she participated in the organization and celebration of the 2017 Catalan independence referendum, which required the opening of schools as polling stations.

After being dismissed as minister, and the Autonomy of Catalunya being suspended pursuant to Article 155 of the Spanish Constitution by the Spanish Government, on 30 October 2017 she went into exile in Brussels with President Carles Puigdemont and three other members of the Catalan Government, Lluís Puig, Antoni Comín and Meritxell Serret.

At the 2017 elections to the Parliament of Catalonia, Clara Ponsatí was elected member of the Parliament within the list of Junts per Catalunya, but she gave up her seat in January 2018 to guarantee the pro-independence majority in the investiture session. On 10 March 2018, she announced that she was leaving Brussels and moving to the United Kingdom to return to the University of St. Andrews as a professor.

In April 2019 Cara Ponsatí ran as number 3 on the list of Junts i Lliures per Europa for the elections to the European Parliament, headed by President Puigdemont. The candidacy won two seats, those of Puigdemont and Comín. Ponsatí could not become a Member of the European Parliament until the formalisation of the Brexit, when the new distribution of seats entailed the entry of Ponsatí to the European Parliament.

Within the European Parliament, Clara Ponsatí is a member of the Committee on Industry, Technology, Research and Energy and of the Sub-Committee on Fiscal Affairs. She is also a substitute member of the Committee on Economic and Monetary Affairs, and participates in the delegation for relations with Canada. In her plenary interventions, Ponsatí has denounced on numerous occasions the failure of the Spanish Government to comply with the Rule of Law in terms of civil and political rights and separation of powers, as well as highlighting that the European Union is not the Union of Peoples that it was intended to be. In the course of her parliamentary term, Clara Ponsatí and her team created the website ‘ruleoflaw.cat’, that consists of a database on the violations of the rights of the Catalans from 2003 to present time. In addition, the website enables the user to report to the European Commission these violations so they can be included in the annual Rule of Law Report published by the European Commission on the current rule of law situation in the Member States of the European Union.

== European Arrest Warrants ==
On 24 March 2018, the Spanish Supreme Court Judge Pablo Llarena issued a European Arrest Warrant against her, and Ponsatí's extradition proceedings commenced before Scottish courts. The rector of the University of Glasgow, Aamer Anwar, was her defence attorney. On 28 March 2018, Ponsatí appeared before the Scottish authorities, who released her provisionally. On 19 July, Judge Pablo Llarena withdrew the European Arrest Warrant against Ponsatí and against the rest of the exiles in Belgium and Switzerland after the German court of Schleswig-Holstein denied the surrender of President Puigdemont to Spain for the crime of rebellion.

On 5 November 2019, Judge Llarena issued a new European Arrest Warrant to the United Kingdom against Clara Ponsatí based on the crime of sedition, Initially, the UK police refused to process the European Arrest Warrant as it was deemed "disproportionate" under British law and it was requested that, in order to re-assess the decision, more information had to be provided. This created a diplomatic conflict and the United Kingdom eventually issued another document to state that deeming the warrant disproportionate had been a mistake. After judge Llarena sent the additional information requested by the British authorities, the United Kingdom agreed to process the European Arrest Warrant.

On 14 November 2019, Ponsatí gave a statement in Edinburgh before a Scottish court, who ended up dismissing the European Arrest Warrant in August 2021, when Ponsatí was already an MEP and was a resident of Belgium. Although Llarena did not withdraw the European Arrest Warrant, the Belgian police did not arrest Ponsatí nor did the Belgian courts open any proceedings, as she enjoyed parliamentary immunity as a Member of the European Parliament. The immunity she enjoyed as a Member of the European Parliament was first waived on 9 March 2021. The results were: 404 votes in favour, 247 against and 42 abstentions. The MEPs appealed the decision but, on 5 July 2023, the General Court of the European Union confirmed the decisions of the European Parliament. The appeal against the General Court's decision is pending before the European Court of Justice.

Concomitantly, and due to the reform of the Spanish Criminal Code, that, inter alia, suppressed the crime of sedition, on 12 January 2023, Spanish Supreme Court judge Pablo Llarena modified the indictment of Ponsatí. Llarena indicted Ponsatí for the crime of disobedience, and withdrew the international, European and national arrest warrants against her for the crime of sedition. Nonetheless, he issued a new national arrest warrant for the crime of disobedience against her. The Criminal Chamber of the Spanish Supreme Court confirmed the amending of the indictment in June 2023.

== Return to Catalonia ==
On 28 March 2023, even though the national arrest warrant against her was still in force in Spain, Clara Ponsatí came back from exile. Once she got to Barcelona from France by car, she called a press conference at the Journalist Association premises in Barcelona to launch the ‘ruleoflaw.cat’ website. Around six, while she was on her way to the Oficina Europarlamentària of Junts i Lliures per Europa in the Born, she was arrested by the Mossos d'Esquadra in the 'Plaça de la Catedral', in spite of the interim parliamentary immunity she enjoyed, as granted by the vice-president of the Court of Justice on 24 May 2022. Òmnium Cultural, Assemblea Nacional Catalana and the Consell de la República called a demonstration before Barcelona's Ciutat de la Justícia. After appearing before a judge in Barcelona Investigating Court number 4, the duty court, she was released at 22:49. Pablo Llarena summoned her to appear before the Supreme Court on 24 April to give a statement for the crime of disobedience. On the same day, Ponsatí's defence team filed an habeas corpus against the arrest, alleging that it had been illegal due to the provisional immunity she enjoyed. The court rejected the petition and her defence team requested the annulment of proceedings and the issuing of preliminary ruling before the Court of Justice of the European Union. In addition, Ponsatí submitted a request for the defence of her parliamentary immunity to the European Parliament President Roberta Metsola, who referred the request to the Committee on Legal Affairs.

On 24 April 2023, Ponsatí did not appear before Llarena. Nonetheless, Ponsatí lodged a submission reminding Llarena that she enjoyed immunity and, in accordance with the case law of the Court of Justice of the European Union, he had the obligation to suspend proceedings against her until the European Parliament had reached a decision on her request. During the forthcoming months, the Prosecutor's Office and the State's Attorney requested Llarena to summon Ponsatí again. Llarena went further than that and, on 21 June 2023, issued a new national arrest warrant against her.

On 24 July 2023, Clara Ponsatí announced on her social media that she was in Barcelona and was arrested again. A new request for the defence of her immunity was submitted to European Parliament President Roberta Metsola. This second time around, she was brought to the Ciutat de la Justícia in Barcelona and Llarena took a statement via form, that she did not answer. She was released after a short while and, on the following day, Llarena closed the pre-trial stage of proceedings. In September 2023, the Prosecutor's Office requested the commencement of trial proceedings against Ponsatí.

== Publications ==
- Molts i ningú. Embastat de memòries i altres històries; Clara Ponsatí; La Campana, 2022
- The Case of the Catalans: Why So Many Catalans No Longer Want to be Part of Spain; Clara Ponsatí (Ed.); Luath Press, 2020
- The stability of Multi-Level Governments; Enriqueta Aragonès; Clara Ponsatí; Barcelona Graduate School of Economics, July 2019
- Meritocracy, egalitarianism and the stability of majoritarian organizations; Salvador Barberà; Carmen Bevià; Clara Ponsatí; Games and Economics Behavior, February 2015, 91:237-257
- Multiple-issue bargaining and axiomatic solutions; Clara Ponsatí; Joel Watson; Pub.: University of California, San Diego. Department of Economics; (Calif.)
- L'endemà; by Clara Ponsatí& alt.; Pub.: [Barcelona] Massa d'Or Produccions Coroporació Catalana de Mitjans Audiovisuals D.L. 2014
- Von Neumann i la teoria de jocs; Ponsatí, Clara; Pub.: 2010-03-11T09:25:00Z 2010-03-11T09:25:00Z 2010-02-24
- Robust bilateral Trade and Mediated Bargaining; Jernej Copic; Clara Ponsatí; Journal of the European Economic Association (2008) 6:570-580
- Bargaining over multiple issues with maximin and leximin preferences; Amparo M. Mármol; Clara Ponsatí; Social Choice and Welfare (2008) 30:211-223
- Bargaining one-dimensional social choices; Daniel Cardona; Clara Ponsatí; Journal of Economic Theory (2007) 137:627-651
- Economic Diplomamcy; Clara Ponsatí; Journal of Public Economic Theory (2004) 6:675-691
- Randomly available outside options in bargaining; Clara Ponsatí; József Sákovics; Spanish Economic REview (2001) 3:231-252
- Rubinstein bargaining with two-sided outside options; Clara Ponsatí; József Sákovics; Economic Theory (1998) 11:667-672
- Multiple-issue bargaining and axiomatic solutions; Clara Ponsati; Joel Watson; International Journal of Game Theory (1997) 26:501-52
- Mediation is necessary for efficient bargaining; Clara Ponsati Obiols; József Sákovics; Universitat Autònoma de Barcelona Departament d'Economia i d'Història Econòmica; Pub.: Barcelona Universitat Autònoma de Barcelona, Departament d'Economia i d'Història Econòmica 1992.
- El Finançament de les comunitats autònomes : comparació internacional; Clara Ponsati Obiols; Institut d'Anàlisi Econòmica.; Universitat Autònoma de Barcelona- 1990.
- Search and Bargaining in Large Markets With Homogeneous Traders; Clara Ponsatí;Publication: Contributions in Theoretical Economics, v4 n1 (2004/2/9);Pub.: Walter de Gruyter eJournals
- La financiación de la Comunidades autónomas : comparación internacional; Clara Ponsati i Obiols; Publication: Revista de economia publica, 1991, 12, pp. 65–10

== See also ==
- Andreu Mas-Colell
