= Laura Borràs =

Spanish politician (born 1970)

The Right Honourable Laura Borràs MP
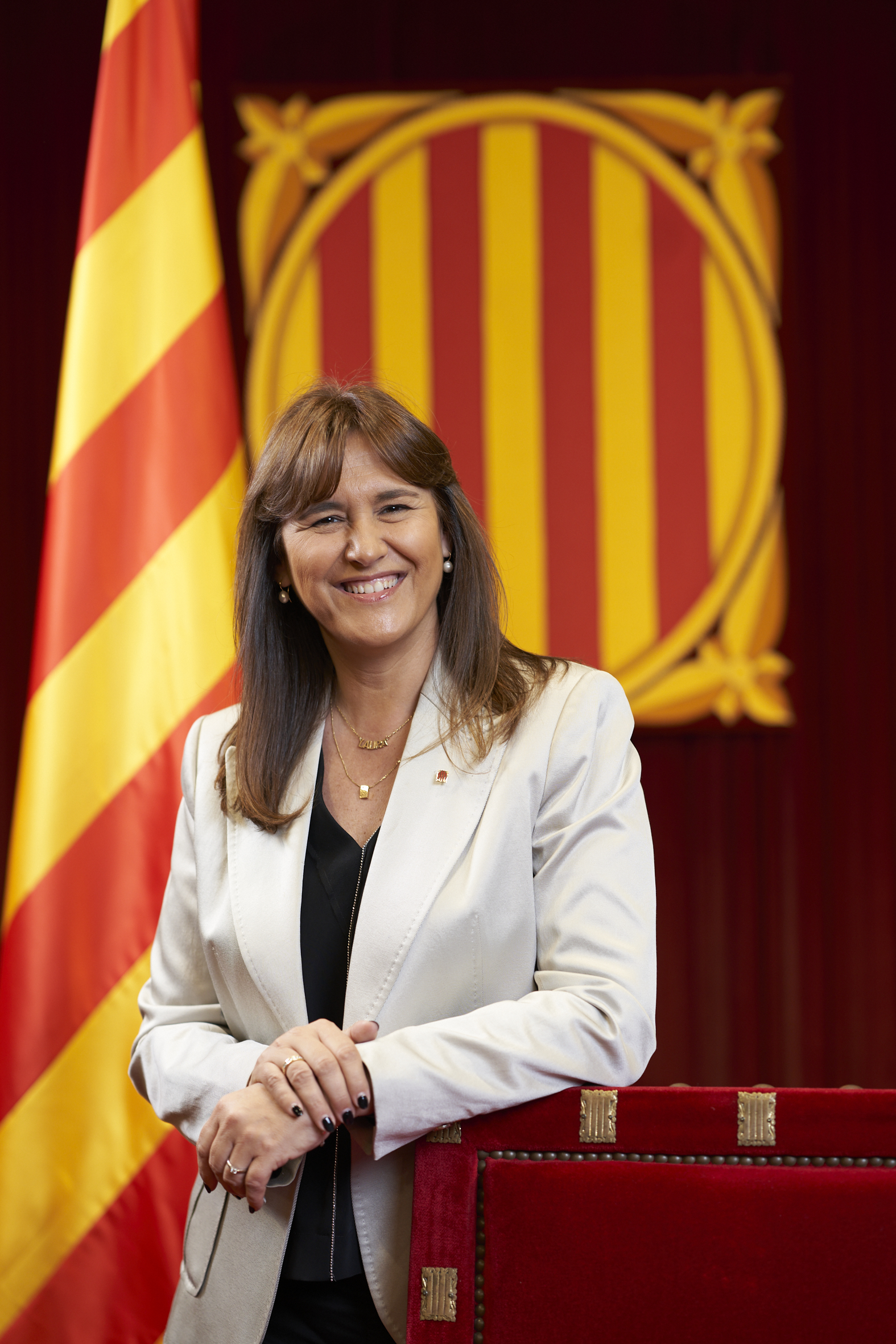
- Official portrait, 2021

16th President of the Parliament of Catalonia
- In office 12 March 2021 – 1 June 2023 suspended since 28 July 2022
- Vice President: Alba Vergés; Assumpta Escarp
- Preceded by: Roger Torrent
- Succeeded by: Anna Erra

President of Junts
- In office 4 June 2022 – 27 October 2024
- Vice President: Anna Erra; Aurora Madaula
- Preceded by: Carles Puigdemont
- Succeeded by: Carles Puigdemont

Member of the Parliament of Catalonia
- In office 12 March 2021 – 1 June 2023
- Constituency: Barcelona
- In office 17 January 2018 – 20 May 2019
- Succeeded by: Glòria Freixa

Member of the Congress of Deputies
- In office 17 May 2019 – 11 March 2021
- Succeeded by: Pilar Calvo
- Constituency: Barcelona

Minister of Culture of Catalonia
- In office 2 June 2018 – 25 March 2019
- President: Quim Torra
- Preceded by: Lluís Puig (Note: Direct rule from 27 October 2017 to 2 June 2018)
- Succeeded by: Mariàngela Vilallonga

Personal details
- Born: Laura Borràs i Castanyer; 5 October 1970 (age 56) Barcelona, Catalonia, Spain
- Citizenship: Spain
- Party: Junts (since 2020)
- Other political affiliations: Independent (until 2020)
- Spouse: Xavier Botet
- Children: 1
- Education: University of Barcelona
- Occupation: Philologist, academic

Laura Borràs i Castanyer (Catalan pronunciation: [ˈlawɾə βuˈras]; born 5 October 1970) is a Spanish philologist, academic and politician from Catalonia who was the President of the Parliament of Catalonia between 2021 and 2022, when she was suspended as member of the Parliament of Catalonia under allegations of corruption.

Born in 1970 in Spain in the city of Barcelona, Borràs studied Catalan philology at the University of Barcelona (UB) before becoming an academic. She taught at UB and the Open University of Catalonia. Between 2013 and 2018 she was director of the Institució de les Lletres Catalanes.

Borràs was a member of Parliament of Catalonia from January 2018 to May 2019 for the pro-independence Together for Catalonia electoral alliance. Between June 2018 and March 2019 she was the Minister of Culture of Catalonia. She was a member of the Congress of Deputies between May 2019 and March 2021.

== Early life ==
Borràs was born on 5 October 1970 in Barcelona, Catalonia, Spain. She received a degree in Catalan philology (1993) and a doctorate in Romance philology (1997) from the University of Barcelona (UB). She received a European doctorate in 1997 and a special Ph.D. in 1998.

== Career ==
Borràs joined UB in 1995 as an associate lecturer in the Department of Romance. She was a lecturer in the university's Department of Literary Theory and Comparative Literature from 1998 to 2013. She was the university's academic director of the master's degree in literature in the digital era. Borràs was also professor of humanities and philology studies at the Open University of Catalonia (UOC) from 1999 and 2007 and professor of languages and cultures from 2007 to 2009. She was a visiting professor at Kingston University from 2010 to 2012.

Borràs is a member of the Electronic Literature Organization's International Literary Advisory Board, a member and lecturer of the European Studies Doctorate Program in Literary Interzones, Erasmus Mundus Joint Doctorate (University of Bergamo) and the Erasmus Intensive Program (University of Paris 8). She has been a jury member for the Sant Jordi Prize, the Ramon Llull Prize and the Catalan Letters Prize.

Borràs was in charge of the 2012 centenary celebrations of Joan Sales i Vallès, Pere Calders and Avel·lí Artís-Gener (Tísner) organised by the Generalitat de Catalunya and City of Barcelona. She helped design the website celebrating the 2013 centenary of Salvador Espriu. She was also in charge of the celebration of Caterina Albert (Víctor Català) (2016) and Montserrat Abelló i Soler (2018). Borràs was director of the Institució de les Lletres Catalanes, an agency that promotes the work of Catalan authors, from January 2013 to January 2018.

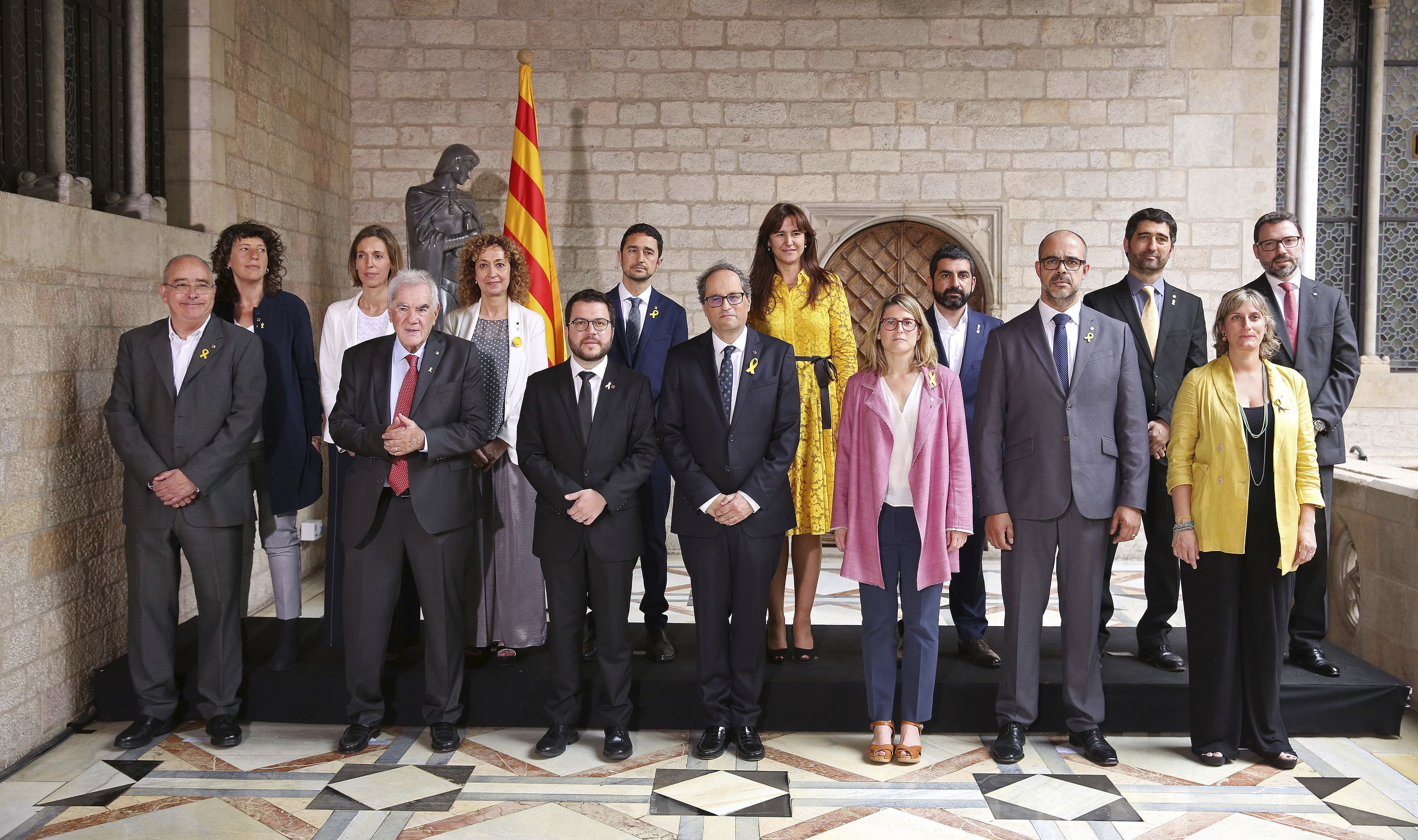
Borràs and other members of the Catalan government on 2 June 2018

Borràs contested the 2017 regional election as an independent c (JuntsxCat) electoral alliance candidate in the Province of Barcelona and was elected to the Parliament of Catalonia. At the election Catalan secessionists retained a slim majority in the Catalan Parliament. On 19 May 2018 newly elected President Quim Torra nominated a new government in which Lluís Puig, who was living in exile, was to be Minister of Culture. However, the Spanish government condemned the inclusion of jailed/exiled politicians in the government as provocative and refused to approve Torra's appointments or to revoke direct rule. Faced with this opposition Torra announced a new government on 29 May 2018 without the jailed/exiled politicians. Borràs was to be Minister of Culture in the new government. She was sworn in on 2 June 2018 at the Palau de la Generalitat de Catalunya.

In March 2019 it was announced that Borràs would be stepping down as Minister of Culture in order to contest the general election. She contested the 2019 general election as a JxCat candidate in the Province of Barcelona and was elected to the Congress of Deputies. She is a member of the National Call for the Republic (Crida Nacional per la República)'s political council.

In November 2020 she ran in the primaries of Junts per Catalunya to run for the Presidency of the Generalitat in the future elections to the Parliament of Catalonia on February 14, 2021, in which she was elected. She was elected President of the Parliament of Catalonia on 12 March 2021. After her indictment for corruption allegations, she was suspended from the Catalan Parliament in July, 2022. The parliament bylaws mandate a suspension of all members under formal judicial investigation. As a result, Borràs stepped down as the president of the parliament on July 28. She was formally suspended on June 1, 2023.

== Conviction for corruption ==
Borràs is accused of fraudulently selecting a supplier for services worth €330,442, as well as prevarication, administrative fraud and falsifying documents.

The charges, which Borràs has denied, date back to the period between 2013 and 2018 when she was at the head of the Institute of Catalan Letters, a public body in charge of promoting Catalan literature. According to investigators, there are signs that Borràs could have fraudulently allocated public contracts to a friend and avoided a public tender by splitting the service into various ones that did not surpass the minimum threshold over which tenders are obligatory.

As mandated by the bylaws of the Parliament of Catalonia, Borràs was suspended as a member and also as its president, on 28 July 2022. All major parties except for Together for Catalonia voted for her suspension.

On 30 March 2023, the Catalan High Court sentenced Laura Borràs to four and a half years in prison for corruption during her time as the head of the Catalan Institute of Letters (ILC). The Court also disqualifies her from holding public office for 13 years and hands down a €36,000 fine. On 12 February 2025, she lost the appeal before the Supreme Court of Spain. and the sentence was confirmed.

== Personal life ==
Borràs is married to Xavier Botet and has a daughter, Marta.

== Published works ==
Borràs is an electronic literature scholar, who served on the Electronic Literature Organization's editorial collective for the Electronic Literature Collection Volume 2.

She has written several books and articles on contemporary literature, theatre, cinema and literature, including:

- Per què Llegir els Clàssics Avui, (2011, Ara Llibres; ISBN 9788492907977)
- Dos Amants com Nosaltres (2012, Ara Llibres; ISBN 9788415224495)
- Under Construction: Literatures Digitals i Aproximacions Teòriques (2012, Edicions UIB; ISBN 9788483842430) (ed.)
- Clàssics Moderns (2013, Ara Llibres; ISBN 9788415224228)
- La Literatura en un Tuit (2017, Símbol Editors)

== Electoral history ==
Electoral history of Laura Borràs
Election	Constituency	Party	Alliance	No.	Result
2017 regional	Province of Barcelona	Independent	Together for Catalonia	5	Elected
2019 general	Province of Barcelona	National Call for the Republic	Together for Catalonia	2	Elected
2021 regional	Province of Barcelona	Together for Catalonia	Together for Catalonia	2	Elected
