= Alfonso Carlos Comín =

Spanish industrial engineer, politician and polygraph

Alfonso Carlos Comín Ros (1933 in Zaragoza – 23 July 1980 in Barcelona) was a Spanish industrial engineer, politician, and polygraph who carried out his work in Catalonia.

== Biography ==
He was the son of Jesús Comín Sagüés, an Aragonese prominent carlist figure. His family had been involved in the Carlist movement since the 19th century. He was raised in Barcelona. Without abandoning his catholic beliefs, he evolved toward communist positions. He married María Lluïsa Oliveres. In 1956, he joined the Popular Liberation Front (Spanish: Frente de Liberación Popular, FLP, known colloquially as FELIPE), but abandoned it in 1962 to join the Workers' Front of Catalonia (Catalan language: Front Obrer de Catalunya, FOC), which was the Catalan referent of FELIPE. In 1970, he joined the Organización Comunista de España (Bandera Roja) (Communist Organization of Spain (Red Flag), (OCE-BR)), but left it to found the Bandera Roja de Catalunya (Red Flag of Catalonia) in 1974, which a little later joined the Unified Socialist Party of Catalonia (Partit Socialista Unificat de Catalunya, PSUC). In 1973, he created the Christians for Socialism movement together with Joan N. García-Nieto, and was one of its central figures. In 1980, he was elected as a representative to the Parliament of Catalonia for the Province of Barcelona on behalf of the PSUC.

A big part of the political and social problem that he dealt with had to do with Andalusian immigrants in Catalonia, especially in Barcelona, from the 1950s. He was the editor of the periodical Taula de Canvi from 1976 until his death. His political heirs founded the Fundació Alfons Comín (Alfons Comín Foundation) in 1983 in his memory. Its principal goals have been to publish the complete works of Alfonso Comín and to work in the line of social, political, and religious commitment that inspired his life.

His son, Antoni Comín, is the current Minister of Health in the Catalan Government.

== Works ==
- España del sur (1965)
- España, ¿país de Misión? (1966)
- Noticia de Andalucía (1970)
- Per una estratègia sindical (1970)
- Fe en la tierra (1975)
- Qué es el sindicalismo (1976)
- La reconstrucción de la Palabra (1977)
- Cristianos en el partido, Comunistas en la Iglesia (1977)
- Por qué soy marxista y otras confesiones (1979)
- Cuba entre el silencio y la utopía (1979)
