= Pilar Calvo =

Catalan journalist and politician (born 1963)

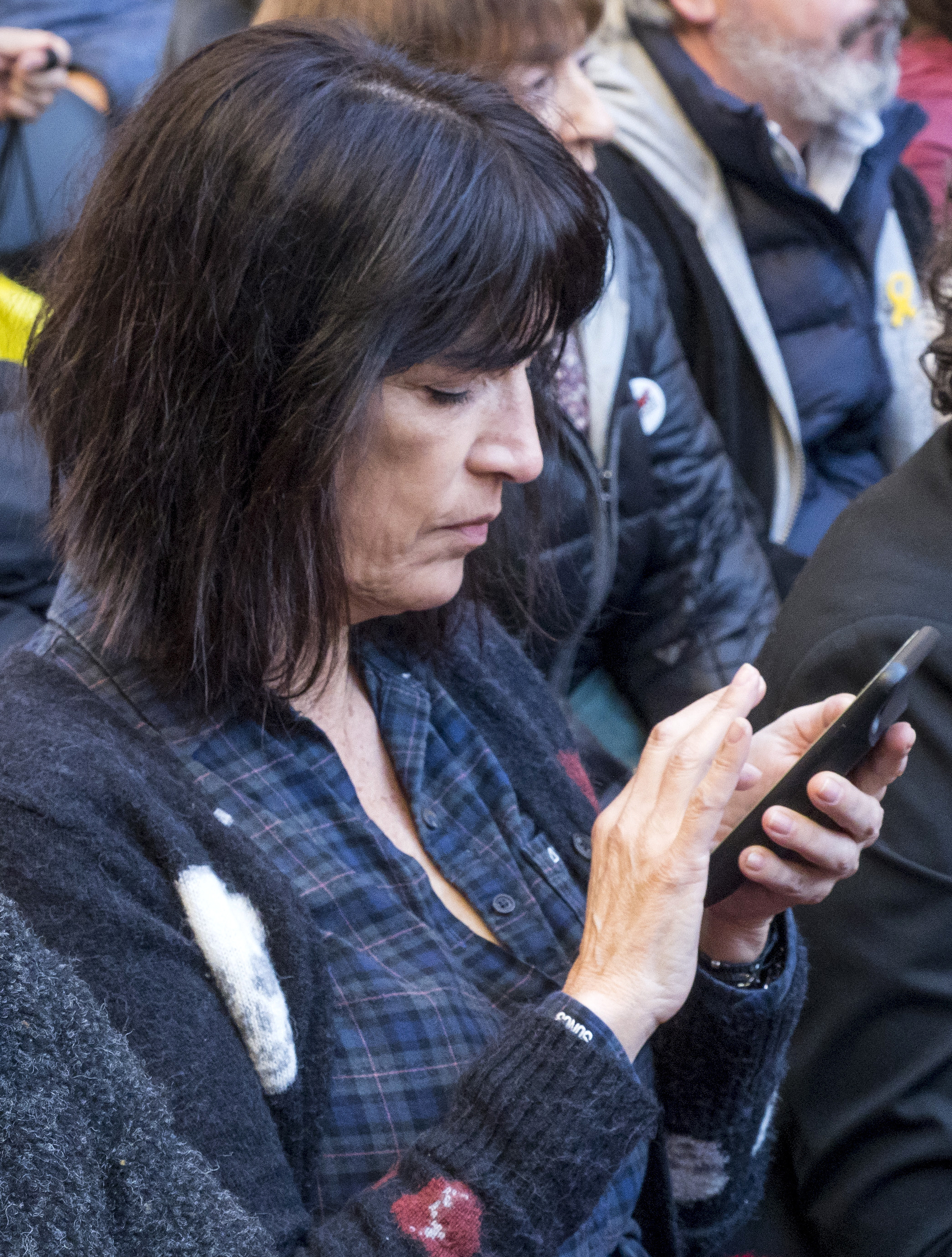
- Calvo in February 2019

Member of the Congress of Deputies of Spain
- Incumbent
- Assumed office 16 March 2021
- Preceded by: Laura Borràs
- Constituency: Barcelona

Personal details
- Born: Maria Pilar Calvo i Gómez; 3 May 1963 (age 63)
- Party: Together for Catalonia
- Occupation: Journalist
- Website: https://pilarcalvo.com

Maria Pilar Calvo i Gómez (born 3 May 1963) is a Spanish journalist, politician and a member of the Congress of Deputies of Spain.

== Early life ==
Calvo was born on 3 May 1963 in Barcelona, Spain.

== Career ==
Calvo is a sports journalist and has been a member of the Association of Journalists of Catalonia (Col·legi de Periodistes de Catalunya) since 1989. She has worked for various media organisations including Catalunya Ràdio and TV3. Her career at Catalunya Ràdio's sports department began when the station was established in 1983. She provided daily news on FC Barcelona and for 13 years she participated in the Futbol a Catalunya Ràdio show. She then moved to TV3 where she presented programmes such as Gol a Gol, Entorn and Tres punts. She has worked as a production assistant for Televisión Española and written articles for Sport, El Periódico de Catalunya and Futari. She was in charge of sponsorship at Gestora Clubs DiR, SL. In recent years she has worked as a consultant in different sectors in China, Europe and South America and is a partner in Esportia, an electronic sports consultancy firm.

At the 2017 regional election, Calvo was placed 64th on the Together for Catalonia (JxCat) electoral alliance's list of candidates in the Province of Barcelona but the alliance only managed to win 17 seats in the province and as a result she failed to get elected. She was one of the founding members of National Call for the Republic in 2018. She was spokesperson for detained Catalonia independence leaders Joaquim Forn, Josep Rull, Jordi Sànchez and Jordi Turull during their hunger strike in December 2018.

At the 2019 local elections, she was placed eighth on JxCat's list of candidates in Barcelona, but the alliance only managed to win five seats in the city and as a result she failed to get elected. At the November 2019 general election she was placed seventh on the JxCat's list of candidates in the Province of Barcelona but the alliance only managed to win four seats in the province and as a result he failed to get elected. However, in March 2021, she was appointed to the Congress of Deputies following the election of Laura Borràs to the Parliament of Catalonia.

Calvo is co-ordinator of Together for Catalonia's (Junts) Barcelona branch.

== Electoral history ==
Electoral history of Pilar Calvo
Election	Constituency	Party	Alliance	No.	Result
2017 regional	Province of Barcelona		Together for Catalonia	64	Not elected
2019 local	Barcelona	National Call for the Republic	Together for Catalonia	8	Not elected
2019 November general	Province of Barcelona	Independent	Together for Catalonia	7	Not elected
