= Anna Erra =

Spanish politician (born 1965)

The Right Honourable Anna Erra i Solà MP
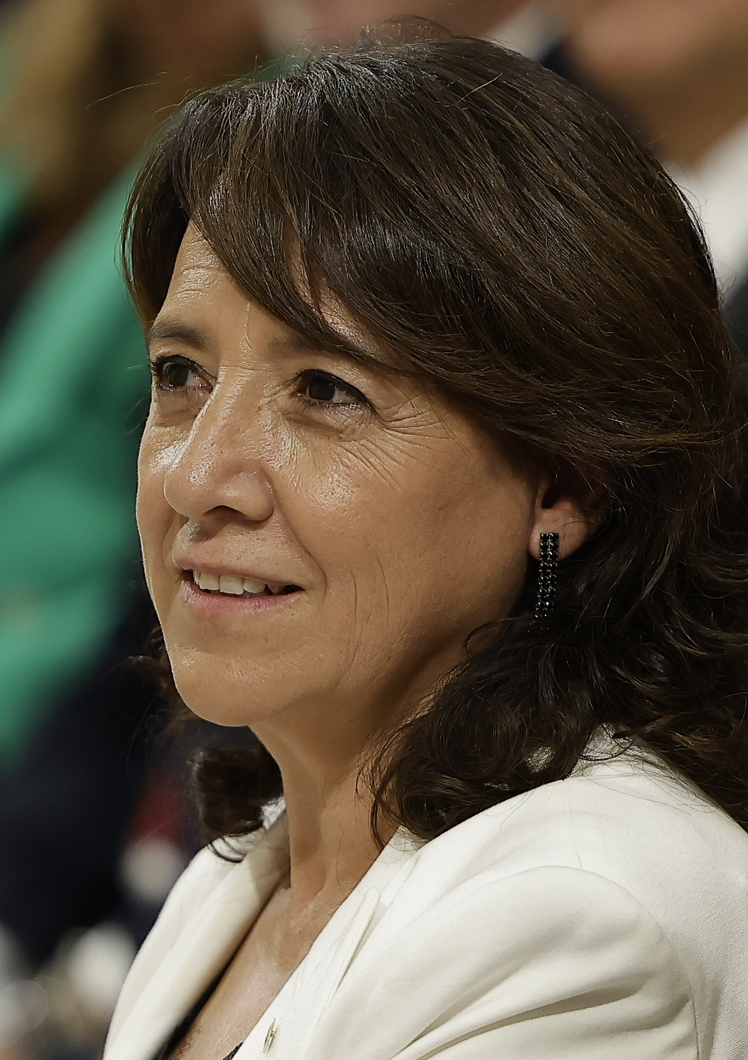
- Anna Erra in September 2023

17th President of the Parliament of Catalonia
- In office 9 June 2023 – 10 June 2024
- Vice President: Alba Vergés; Assumpta Escarp
- Preceded by: Laura Borràs; Alba Vergés (acting)
- Succeeded by: Josep Rull

Member of the Parliament of Catalonia
- Incumbent
- Assumed office 19 June 2018
- Constituency: Barcelona

Mayor of Vic
- In office 13 June 2015 – 17 June 2023
- Preceded by: Josep María Vila
- Succeeded by: Albert Castells

Personal details
- Born: Anna Erra i Solà; 7 October 1965 (age 60) Vic, Spain
- Party: Junts (2020–present)
- Other party: CDC (until 2016); PDeCAT (2016–2020)
- Occupation: Politician

Anna Erra i Solà (Catalan pronunciation: [ˈannə ˈɛrə]; born 7 October 1965) is a Spanish teacher and politician who served as President of the Parliament of Catalonia between June 2023 and June 2024. She is also a deputy in the Parliament of Catalonia for Junts per Catalunya. Between 2015 and 2023 she was Mayor of Vic, representing Junts per Catalunya.

== Biography ==
She graduated with a degree in Geography and History from the University of Barcelona and a diploma in Teaching from the University of Vic. For more than twenty years she worked as a teacher at the Sant Miquel dels Sants college in Vic.

Between 2007 and 2015, Erra was a local councilor in Vic. In the 2015 local elections, she was elected mayor of Vic thanks to a government pact with the PSC. On June 19, 2018, Erra took office as deputy in the Parliament of Catalonia, after Isabel Ferrer resigned her seat. In the 2019 local elections she got an absolute majority, 11 seats out of 21 possible.

In February 2020 she apologised for comments she made which she thought may have been misunderstood. She was trying to address the issue that some Catalans switch to Spanish when they meet strangers on the assumption that they won't understand Catalan. She was trying to encourage Catalans to not make that assumption.

On August 9, 2020, she was elected vice-president and head of institutional relations of her political party, Junts per Catalunya. In June 2022 she announced that she would not run for mayor in the municipal elections of 2023.

On 9 June 2023, after the disqualification of Laura Borràs, she was sworn in as President of the Parliament of Catalonia.
