= Alba Vergés =

Spanish politician

The Honourable Alba Vergés
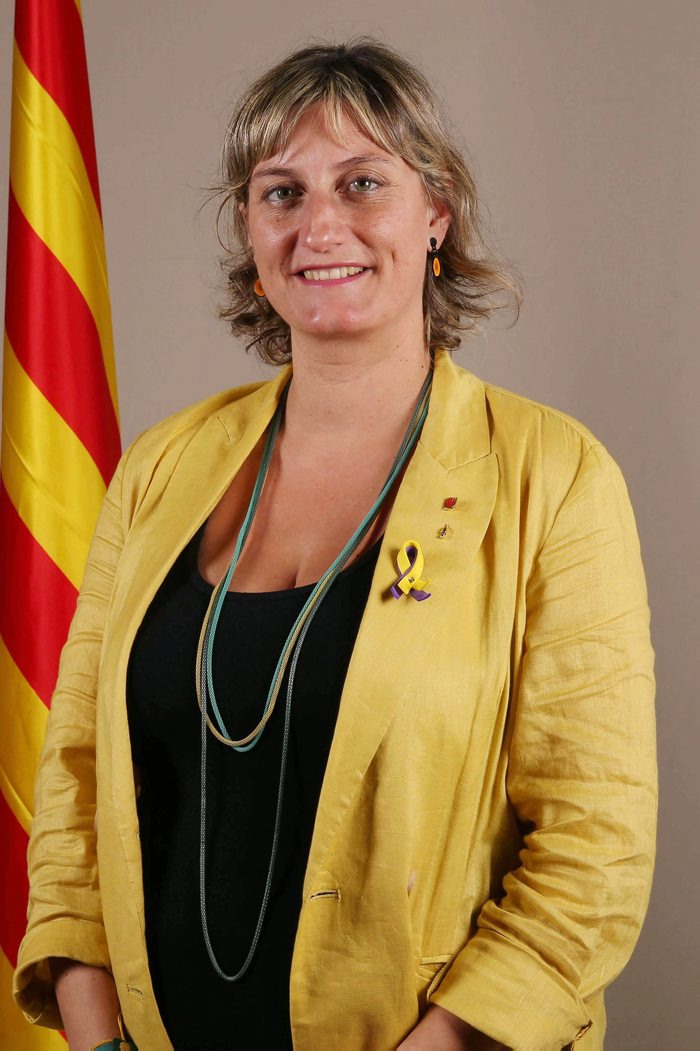
- Vergés in June 2018

Acting President of the Parliament of Catalonia
- In office 28 July 2022 – 9 June 2023
- Preceded by: Laura Borràs
- Succeeded by: Anna Erra

First Vice President of the Parliament of Catalonia
- In office 15 June 2021 – 10 June 2024
- President: Laura Borràs (2021–2022)
- Preceded by: Anna Caula i Paretas
- Succeeded by: Raquel Sans

Minister of Health
- In office 2 June 2018 – 26 May 2021
- President: Quim Torra
- Preceded by: Toni Comín (Direct rule from 27 October 2017)
- Succeeded by: Josep Maria Argimon

Fourth Secretary of the Parliament of Catalonia
- In office 17 January 2018 – 4 June 2018
- Preceded by: Ramona Barrufet i Santacana
- Succeeded by: Adriana Delgado i Herreros

Member of the Catalan Parliament for the Province of Barcelona
- In office 18 December 2012 – 14 June 2018
- Succeeded by: Marc Sanglas i Alcantarilla

Personal details
- Born: Alba Vergés i Bosch; 3 September 1978 (age 48) Igualada, Catalonia, Spain
- Citizenship: Spanish
- Party: Republican Left of Catalonia
- Other political affiliations: Republican Left of Catalonia–Catalonia Yes
- Education: University of Barcelona; Open University of Catalonia
- Occupation: Economist

Alba Vergés i Bosch (born 3 September 1978) is a Catalan economist and politician who is current serving as the First Vice President of the Parliament of Catalonia since 2021 and as Acting President of the Parliament of Catalonia from July 2022 until June 2023, when she was succeeded by Anna Erra.

== Early life ==
Vergés was born on 3 September 1978 in Igualada, Catalonia, Spain. She has a degree in economics from the University of Barcelona and a degree in technical engineering in computer management from the Open University of Catalonia.

== Career ==
Vergés worked as an economist in the elderly care and as a junior programmer in information and communications technology, developing clothing store management software. She was an administrative officer at the Colegio Oficial de Agentes Comerciales de Barcelona in Anoia and in charge of administration, accounting and finance at the Sociosanitario Consortium of Igualada, an organisation that manages public elder care centres, from 2008 to 2012.

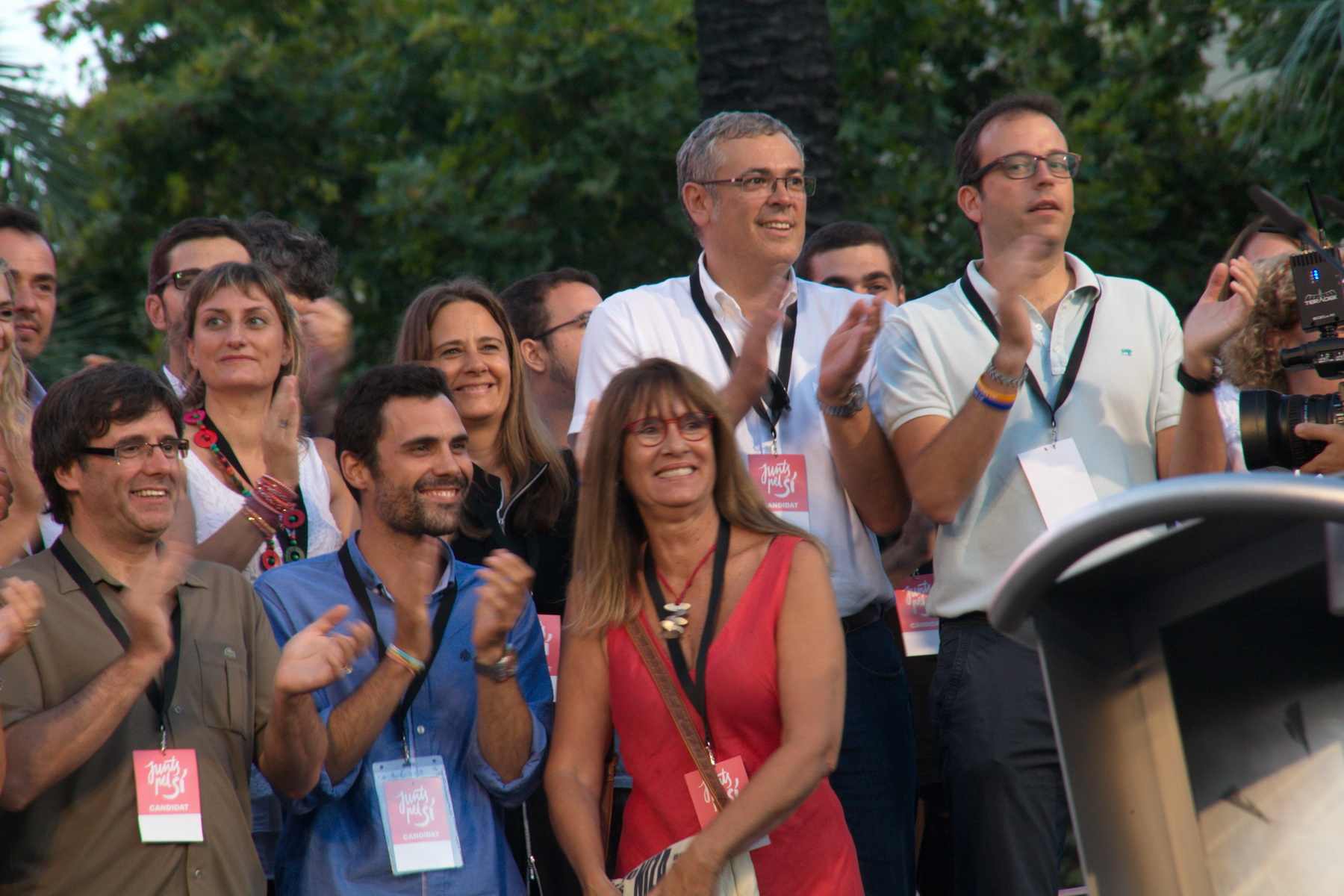
Vergés at the presentation of Junts pel Sí candidates on 28 August 2015

Vergés joined the Republican Left of Catalonia (ERC) in 2011 and became president of its Igualada branch in 2012. She is a member of the Assemblea Nacional Catalana and La Teixidora. At the 2011 local elections Puigneró was placed 3rd on the Republican Left of Catalonia-Reagrupament-Acord Municipal electoral alliance's list of candidates in Igualada but the alliance only managed to win two seats in the municipality and as a result she was not elected.

Vergés contested the 2012 regional election as a Republican Left of Catalonia–Catalonia Yes (ERC–CatSí) electoral alliance candidate in the Province of Barcelona and was elected to the Parliament of Catalonia. She was re-elected at the 2015 and 2017 regional elections. She was elected to the Board of the Parliament of Catalonia as Fourth Secretary on 17 January 2018.

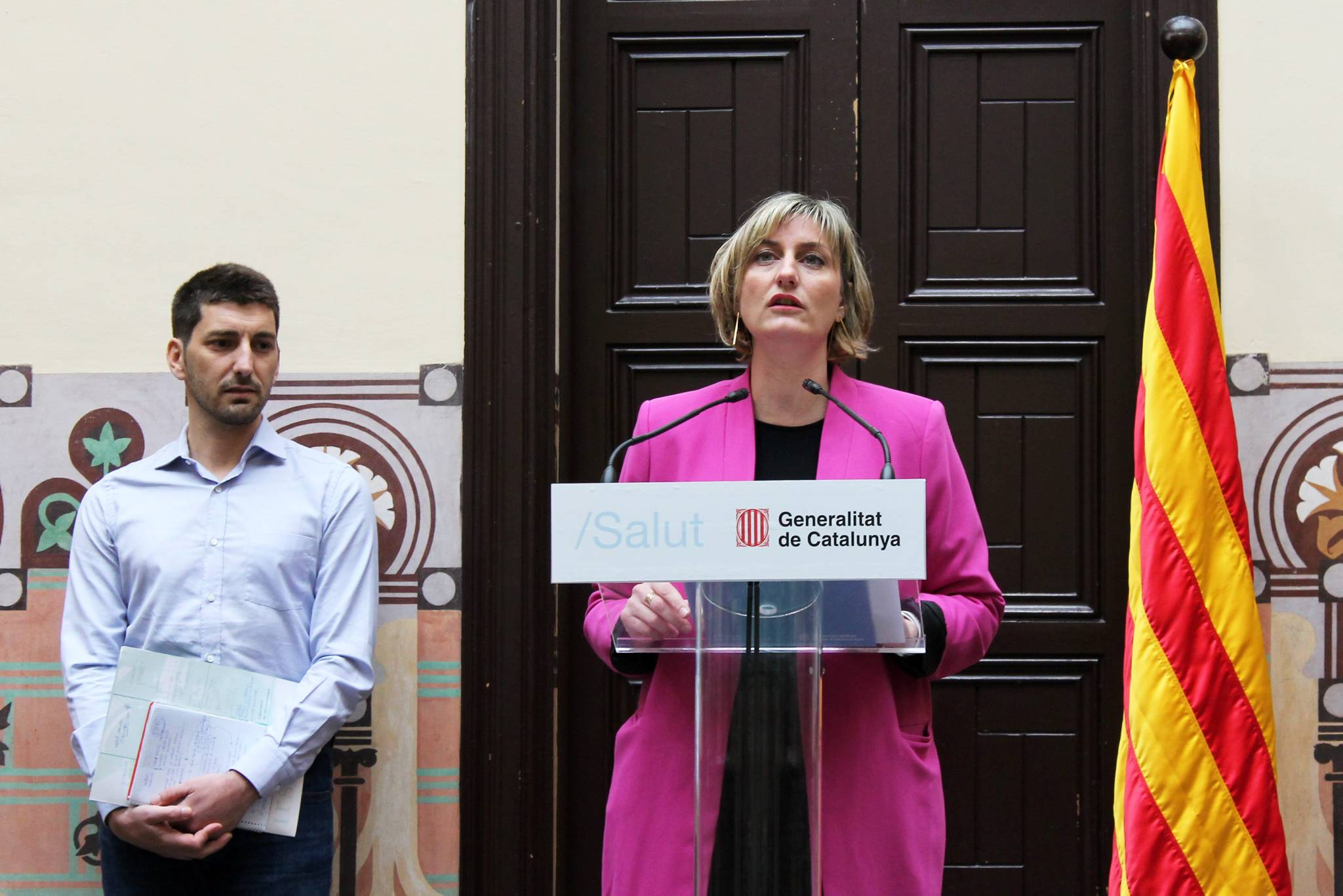
Vergés in a COVID-19 press conference on 16 March 2020

On 19 May 2018 newly elected President of Catalonia Quim Torra nominated a new government in which Toni Comín, who was in living in exile, was to be Minister of Health. However, the Spanish government condemned the inclusion of jailed/exiled politicians in the government as provocative and refused to approve Torra's appointments or to revoke direct rule. Faced with this opposition Torra announced a new government on 29 May 2018 without the jailed/exiled politicians. Vergés was to be Minister of Health in the new government. She was sworn in on 2 June 2018 at the Palau de la Generalitat de Catalunya. She resigned as Fourth Secretary on 4 June 2018 and as an MP on 14 June 2018.

== Electoral history ==
Electoral history of Alba Vergés
| Election | Constituency | Party | Alliance | No. | Result |
|---|---|---|---|---|---|
| 2011 local | Igualada | Republican Left of Catalonia | Republican Left of Catalonia-Reagrupament-Acord Municipal | 3 | Not elected |
| 2012 regional | Province of Barcelona | Republican Left of Catalonia | Republican Left of Catalonia–Catalonia Yes | 10 | Elected |
| 2015 regional | Province of Barcelona | Republican Left of Catalonia | Junts pel Sí | 23 | Elected |
| 2017 regional | Province of Barcelona | Republican Left of Catalonia | Republican Left of Catalonia–Catalonia Yes | 6 | Elected |
