= Christians for Socialism =

Political and cultural movement

Christians for Socialism (Spanish: Cristianos por el socialismo; CpS) is a worldwide political and cultural movement focused on social inequality and economic injustice, inspired by liberation theology. The movement was founded in 1971 and was active in Chile until 1973. The movement was widely supported in Chile by those who supported Allende's government, as Allende offered to work with the Church in setting up his Socialist structure. The movement disbanded following the 1973 military coup in which Allende's government was overthrown.

== Founding ==
Having begun in Chile in April 1971, Christians for Socialism first gained notoriety when a collection of eighty Chilean priests, known as the "Group of 80", publicly declared their support of the construction of socialism along the lines being followed by then-President Salvador Allende. Allende had offered to work with the Catholic Church to structure the socialist government in Chile. The Secretariat of Christians for Socialism was formally established in September 1973. The group was predominantly composed of Roman Catholic members of the Christian left who were inspired and spurred on by the Second Vatican Council.

The group welcomed left-leaning Christians who had enthusiastically embraced the Catholic Church's openness and renewal following the Second Vatican Council. Many prominent figures in Catholic associations adhered to the idea of the "Christian path to socialism" and "socialism with a human face." In Chile, its immediate antecedent was Iglesia Joven (Young Church).

== Project ==
CpS was founded to counteract a presumption that Christian institutions were inherently opposed to socialism. While its founders found aspects of socialist programs that they wished to critique, they wanted to do so as insiders within the socialist movement, rather than as adversaries. From their beginnings as supporters of Allende, CpS has been associated with firm support for socialist leaders. Accordingly, CpS leaders cultivated strong ties with Cuban revolutionary leader Fidel Castro. During Castro's 1972 visit in Chile, 120 Chilean Catholic priests had friendly meetings with Castro, as well as Archbishop Raul Silva Henriquez. CpS was intended as a movement of active political involvement and participation, and involved discussions bringing together current political events and church documents in light of each other. CpS inspired a series of social programs in the public sector. Priests in CpS led union units and organized peasant federations.

== Antecedents ==
In Chile the immediate antecedent to CpS was the Iglesia Joven movement. In Italy, many of the young people who had been involved in the Italian student and worker protests of 1968 joined the movement, and the Christian Associations of Italian Workers (ACLI) was very supportive.

== Leaders ==
López Trujillo, the General Secretary of the Latin American Episcopal Conference at the time, considers Giulio Girardi a major leader of CpS. Another prominent leader was the Salesian priest Lidia Menapace, who was also a significant figure in the Italian Catholic resistance during World War II. In Spain, Alfonso Carlos Comín was a key leader in establishing the movement. The theologian Gustavo Gutiérrez was also a member and led sessions at all the major conferences.

== Gatherings ==
A number of important gatherings have been held under the auspices of Christians for Socialism. In 1972, 400 members met for a week at a textile union hall, urging "class struggle [as] the only valid course to necessary social change in Latin America." CpS brought together similar Latin American movements in the Latin American Meeting of Christians for Socialism 1974 in Santiago, Chile.

In 1975, the Christians for Socialism conference in Detroit, Michigan, formally introduced liberation theology to the United States. This event was a significant convergence where black, feminist, and third-world anti-imperialist movements joined together and recognized each other as peers in the same process of liberation, while also strongly critiquing one another. A detailed account of the meeting was published.

Christians for Socialism groups sprung up in France, Italy, and West Germany. In Germany, CpS was a radical rival to Enlightenment liberalism and "German idealism's aspirations to freedom".

== Critiques ==
López Trujillo has critiqued CpS for holding an understanding of liberation too strongly influenced by Marxist political theory rather than the integral Christian liberation stance espoused by the Latin American Episcopal Conference. It has been said that for some members of Christians for Socialism, there is "no salvation incarnate outside of class struggle."

== Suppression and opposition ==
In May 1972, there was opposition to CpS by the Conference of Latin American Bishops' Department of Social Action, due to concerns that the April 1972 CpS meeting was Marxist manipulation of churchgoers to further the CpS agenda.Left-leaning priests from Brazil and Bolivia were supportive but unable to participate in gatherings due to severe police control. CpS was short-lived in Chile, due to strong resistance from the Episcopal Conference of Chile under the direction of its secretary general, bishop Carlos Oviedo Cavada. In their letter condemning the movement, the bishops there argued that while the church speaks to "politics insofar as it underlies every social reality", it should not be involved in "partisan activity". Chilean clergy involved in the movement were banned from political participation altogether in April 1973.

== Disbanding ==
The movement was suppressed by the Chilean military dictatorship after the coup of 1973. The persecution of the regime led to many key leaders fleeing Chile. Father Pablo Richard, one of the most active members of CpS, left Chile at this time. Many of the grassroots members of CpS, especially those in poorer areas faced imprisonment, torture and death at the hands of the Pinochet regime. In addition to the actions taken against members of CpS by the Pinochet regime, a public condemnation of CpS was issued by the Church, following the coup.

== See also ==
- Christian democracy
- Catholic social teaching
- Christian socialism
- Socialism with a human face
