= Jesús Comín Sagüés =

Spanish Carlist politician and soldier

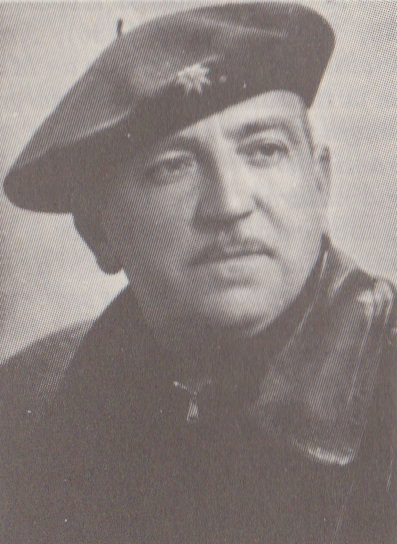
- Born: 19 April 1889; Zaragoza, Spain
- Died: 4 March 1939 (aged 49); Zaragoza, Spain
- Occupations: librarian, scholar
- Known for: politician

Jesús Comín y Sagüés (19 April 1889 – 4 March 1939) was a Spanish Carlist politician and soldier. He has been twice elected deputy to the Republican Cortes. He is also recognized for his role during early days of the Civil War, when he decisively contributed to Nationalist seizure of Zaragoza and large part of Aragón.

== Family and youth ==
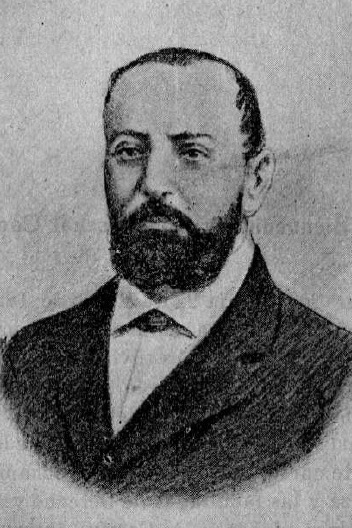
Bienvenido Comín

The well established Comín family for generations has been producing locally distinguished figures. Jesus’ great-grandfather sided with Carlos V during the First Carlist War and sought refuge on exile afterwards. His son, Bienvenido Comín Sarté (1828-1880), became a recognized lawyer, known as "el abogado de los pobres", and member of the Zaragoza ayuntamiento. He sided with Carlos VII during the Third Carlist War, member of the Royal Council and leader of Junta Provincial Católico-Monárquica. He too had to flee abroad; upon return he grew to a distinguished Zaragoza law scholar, Traditionalist thinker and writer. Until death he continued as regional party leader in Aragon.

Bienvenido's son and the uncle of Jesús, Pascual Comín Moya, in 1919 briefly was the national party jefe. Pascual's brother and Jesús' father, Francisco Javier Comín Moya (1857-1932), has not occupied major posts in the party, engaging rather in local Catholic periodicals like El Noticiero. His prestigious position in the Zaragoza realm resulted from his stand as a recognized academic: in 1895 he assumed Cátedra de procedimientos judiciales y práctica forense of the University of Zaragoza and retained the position for the following 35 years. In 1921 he became dean of the Facultad de derecho, the post held - since 1931 as honorary dean - until death. Francisco Javier was married to Rosario Sagüés Mugiro; it is not clear how many children the couple had.

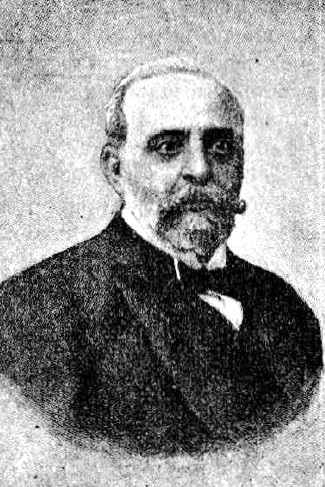
Pascual Comín

None of the sources consulted provides information on early education of Jesús. Upon receiving bachillerato he entered Facultad de Derecho at Universidad de Zaragoza; his graduation in jurisprudence is not confirmed, though later on occasionally the press referred to him "abogado". It is known, however, that he was excellent student in Filosofia y Letras, graduating in 1913 with premio extraordinario; at unspecified date he reached the grade of doctor in Philosophy and Letters, still in Zaragoza.

In 1920 Jesús Comín Sagüés married a Catalan, María Pilar Ros Martínez (1896–1973); the couple had seven children, brought up in fervently Catholic ambience. The only one which became a nationwide known figure was Alfonso Carlos Comín Ros. He gained recognition for theoretical attempt to merge militant Communism with Christianity, dubbed cristiano-marxismo; political prisoner in the Francoist Spain, he was one of the PSUC and PCE leaders. María Pilar Comín Ros and Javier Comín Ros were locally known in Catalonia as contributors to the Barcelona daily La Vanguardia; María Pilar ran the section on women's fashion. Jesús grandson and Alfonso Carlos' son, Antoni Comín i Oliveres, is a Catalan Separatist politician. He was the Minister of Health of the Executive Council of Catalonia between 2016 and 2017. The older brother of Jesús, Francisco Javier, specialized in commercial law and served as catedrático in a number of Spanish universities; another one, Jose Maria, was active as Carlist politician, in the 1940s he joined Carloctavismo and in the 1950s recognized Don Juan as a legitimate Carlist heir.

== Public servant ==
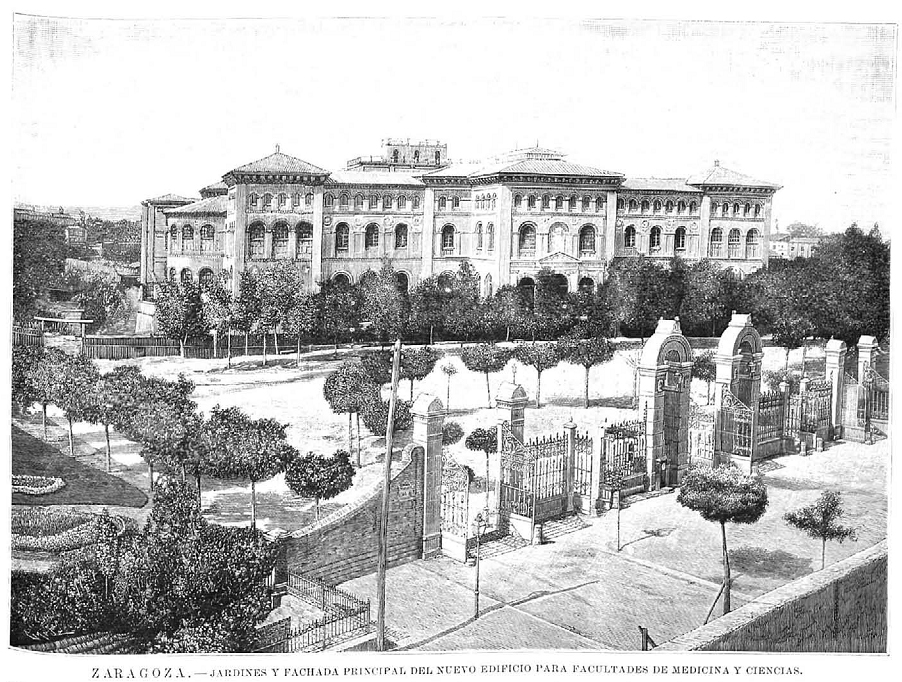
Zaragoza University, early 20th c.

Upon graduation Comín applied for entry into Cuerpo de Archiveros, Bibliotecarios y Arqueólogos, a state-controlled corporation entrusted with protection of national cultural heritage; following the nationwide contest process he emerged victorious as the 3rd best among 45 successful candidates nationwide and in 1915 was admitted to the corps. He was assigned to Biblioteca Universidaria de Zaragoza with the annual salary of 3,000 pesetas. During the next few years Comín worked as an archivist in the university and elsewhere, taking care of various archival projects in Aragón and beyond: he was noted as appointed in 1919 to Archivo de Hacienda de Zamora and in 1921 nominated director of the local Teruel archive. It is not clear how long he carried on with the librarian and archivist tasks; none of the contemporary sources consulted referred to him as such after the mid-1920s. However, he remained member of the corps until 1936; in September the appropriate ministry of the Republican government relegated Comín from Cuerpo de Archiveros, Bibliotecarios y Arqueólogos.

Some time during the last years of the Restoration Comín commenced working at Facultad de Filosofía y Letras at the Zaragoza University, where at that time his father was member of the academic Junta de Gobierno. In 1920, apart from having carrying on with his librarian duties, he was also noted as professor auxiliar at the faculty of philosophy and letters. An apparently temporary assignment was prolonged in 1924. He signed a new contract for the following 4 years, though there was no professional progress recorded; he remained professor auxiliar temporal. It is not clear what his exact role was and in particular, whether he assumed senior teaching duties or rather performed junior academic roles; he is listed as auxiliary member of the Filosofía y Letras faculty staff in the late 1920s and in the early 1930s.

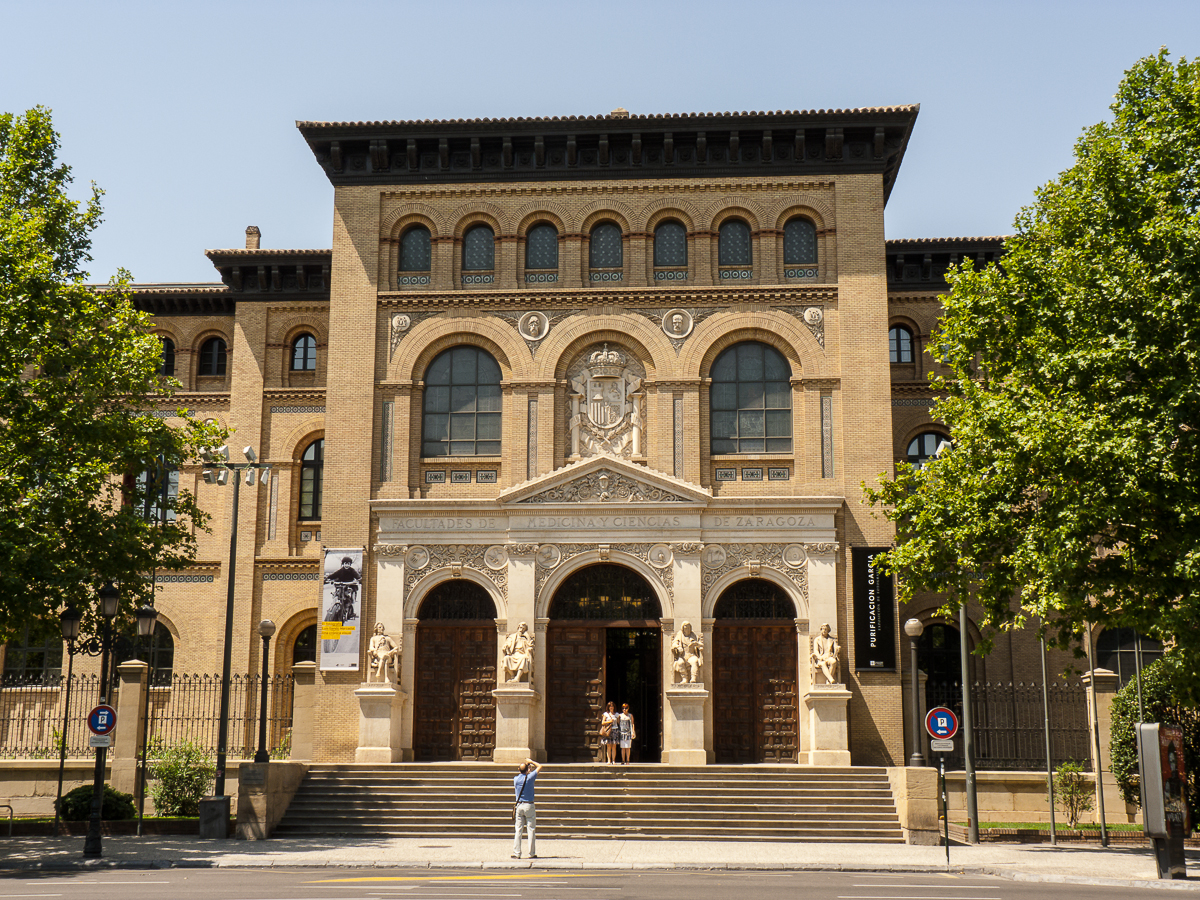
Zaragoza University, current view

Comín's position in the academic realm of the Republic is uncertain; it is not clear whether he continued working at the University, either as a librarian or as a scholar. Occasionally he was referred to as "catedrático"; a present-day scholar names him "Professor Jesús Comín" and even claims he chaired a faculty, but points to Law instead of Letters. The official Cortes service referred to him as "abogado" rather than as a scholar. None of the sources consulted lists any Comín's scholarly works. A rather hagiographical and outdated encyclopedic entry notes his extensive culture and asserts that he specialized in political, philosophical, literary and historical studies. A monograph dedicated to Zaragoza University staff supporting the Nationalist rebels of 1936 does not list Comín at all.

== Early politics ==
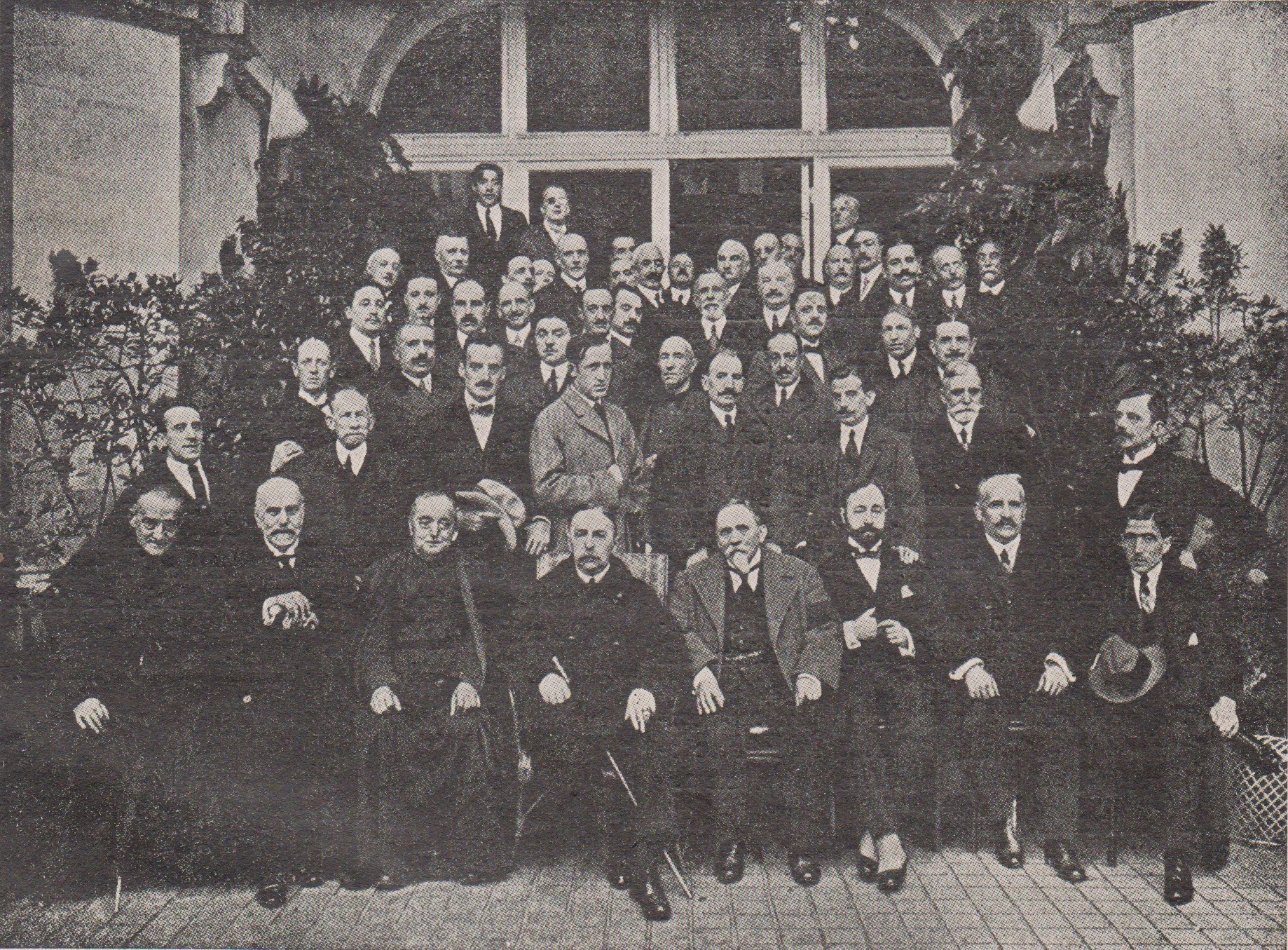
Magna Junta de Biarritz

Born and raised in the iconic Carlist Aragón dynasty, Jesús was from his childhood growing accustomed to regional and national party leaders visiting his family home. As a teenager he was active in Carlist juvenile organizations, and in 1912 he rose to leader of the local Agrupación Escolar Tradicionalista. At that time he was already active beyond his native Aragón, e.g. when leading a group of Navarrese youth during pilgrimage to the Zaragoza sanctuary of Virgen del Pilar. In the 1910s Carlism was suffering from conflict between the claimant, Don Jaime, and the key party theorist, Juan Vázquez de Mella; the Comín family, though like de Mella assuming somewhat Germanophile positions during the Great War, remained loyal to their king. Jesús career in the party ranks was boosted when his uncle assumed leadership of Comunión Católico-Monárquica; the same year he entered Comité de Acción Jaimista, a loyalist body working to mobilize support for the pretender.

In 1919 Comín took part in works of the grand Jaimista reunion named Junta Magna de Biarritz, an assembly intended to provide the movement with a new momentum following the Mellista breakup. Though the gathering was massively attended, his taking part demonstrated Comín's growing position in the party ranks. In 1920 he tried his hand when running for the Cortes from the South Aragonese district of Daroca, presenting his bid as a Jaimist and Agrarian candidate. He lost to a conservative rival and appealed, accusing his counter-candidate with corruption; the charge was dismissed. He did not take part in the last electoral campaign of Restauración in 1923, as the Jaimistas agreed they would abstain from what they considered corrupt democracy.

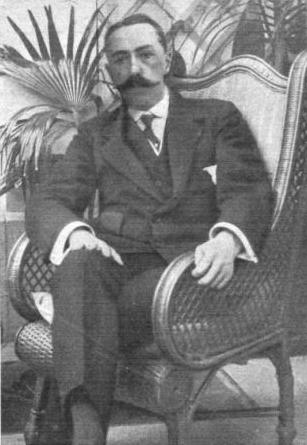
Don Jaime

Advent of the Primo de Rivera dictatorship brought political life to a standstill, with all political parties dissolved. There is no information on Comín's political activity during the mid- and late 1920s; he is listed neither as engaged in Carlist organizations nor in the primoderiverista structures; when noted in the press, it was rather due to his university engagements, activity in numerous Catholic associations, like Caballeros de Nuestra Señora del Pilar, or organizing sport events, e.g. a lawn tennis tournament in Zaragoza. Upon the fall of dictatorship and re-emergence of Carlist political structures in 1930 Comín was for the first time noted as member of the Aragón party executive, Junta Regional. Some authors claim that during dictablanda he was not adverse towards the new military regime and tentatively agreed to take part in "organized" elections for the Cortes, planned for 1931; he would stand in Daroca again. Nothing came out of these plans as the monarchy collapsed and the Republic was declared.

== Republic ==
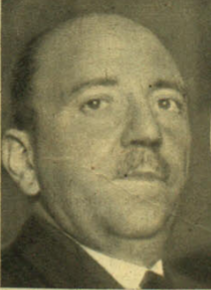
Comín as MP

During the early months of the Republic Comín emerged as engaged in a number of Jaimist initiatives going far beyond the regional realm and with major nationwide impact. In June 1931 he contributed to reformatting of Requeté from a self-defense militia to a paramilitary formation; more importantly, in the autumn of that year and with a group of senior Carlist leaders he took part in preliminary talks with the Alfonsist politicians, intended as preparations for a would-be dynastical agreement. Fully authorized by Don Jaime, they met with the Alfonsinos in San Sebastián, leading later to the so-called Pacto de Territet. Comín's stance on dynastical agreement is not clear; later that year he was noted as speaking against any common monarchist movement, including sort of a monarchist shirt organization.

New republican regime and its militantly secular course drew three separate Carlist branches together; Comín contributed by propaganda activities, delivering addresses as far as in Santander. Following re-unification in Comunión Tradicionalista, within the new party structures Comín emerged as head of the municipal Zaragoza organization, 1932 noted as presidente of the local Círculo Tradicionalista. He also retained his position in the regional executive, now renamed to Junta Suprema de Aragón and scaled down to just 3 members.

In 1933 Comín stood on a joint right-wing electoral list and was elected to the Cortes; 3 years later he would renew his mandate standing in the same Zaragoza district. In the parliament he remained a restless and militant deputy; some declare him "famous for his numerous interventions" while the others would rather prefer to call him notorious. Member of 3 committees, he tended to focus on Aragon rather than on nationwide problems, rising questions of flood damages, regulation of the Ebro or underused railway hub in Canfranc. Apart from the Left, which grudgingly acknowledged his harsh harangues against the Anarchist 1933 uprising and the 1934 Asturian revolution, he gained enemies also among the Republicans, enraged by Comín's onslaught on FUE and masonry, and among CEDA, as he repeatedly clashed with Ramón Serrano Suñer over local self-government regime and attacked the Lerroux government.

Carlist standard

Comín was fairly explicit about necessity to introduce "national dictatorship" as a stepping stone towards Traditionalist monarchy; in practical terms he seemed to have changed his mind compared to his 1931 position and supported a monarchist alliance within National Bloc; he signed its launch 1934 manifesto. The strategy did not go well with the new Carlist leader Manuel Fal, who nevertheless in 1934 appointed Comín to Council of Culture, a congregation of Carlist pundits. The same year he grew to regional Aragón jefe, presided over dynamic growth of the provincial organization and emerged among most active party propagandists, attending Traditionalists feasts from Poblet in Catalonia to Quintillo in Andalusia. He also founded a local El Lunes weekly and collaborated with a number of others Carlist periodicals.

== Civil War ==
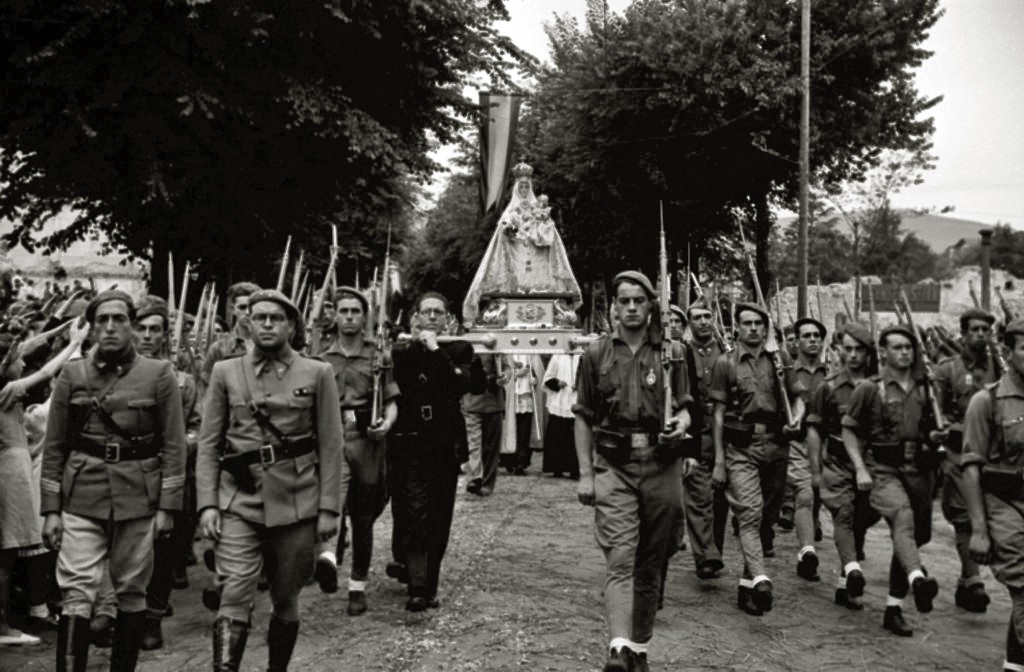
Requeté, early Civil War

During the last 2 years of the Republic Comín focused on buildup of the local Requeté organization; in mid-1935 Zaragoza was able to field only 2 companies; a year later the organization expanded by leaps and bounds; the city could have presented one battalion and emerged as one of the most mobilized Carlist centers in Spain. Amidst standoff during the first few days of the rebellion in Zaragoza Comín travelled twice to Pamplona to secure reinforcements and came back with some 1,200 Navarrese requetés. The Carlist militiamen helped to overwhelm pockets of workers' resistance in the city, overran the surrounding province and met the Anarchist column advancing from Barcelona some 22 km East of the Aragon capital. As a result, Zaragoza, one of the national anarchist strongholds, remained firmly in Nationalists' hands.

Following the seizure of Zaragoza Comín played a politically vital role, transforming the Aragon insurgency from defense of the Republic against anarchy, as Cabanellas would have had it, into a monarchist, ultra-conservative and fanatically Catholic crusade. Under his command the Carlists were tearing down republican flags and replacing them with monarchist banners; he personally introduced Virgen del Pilar painting into the ayuntamiento hall, while the city elated in religious celebrations. Comín threw himself into organizing the new Requeté battalions; in late July the first sub-units of Tercio de Nuestra Señora del Pilar were formed, later on followed by another Aragon battalion, Tercio de los Almogávares. In the autumn Comín was incorporated into command structures of the Pilar tercio, though given his lack of military training it is not clear what exactly his position was. He spent December 1936 in line on the Madrid front, though it is not known what was his unit at the time; also later on he served in the frontline troops on the on and off basis, present among soldiers entering Teruel when re-taken by the Nationalists in early 1938. He suffered combat wounds; noted for demonstrating bravery which bordered imprudence, Comín was admonished for taking unnecessary risks.

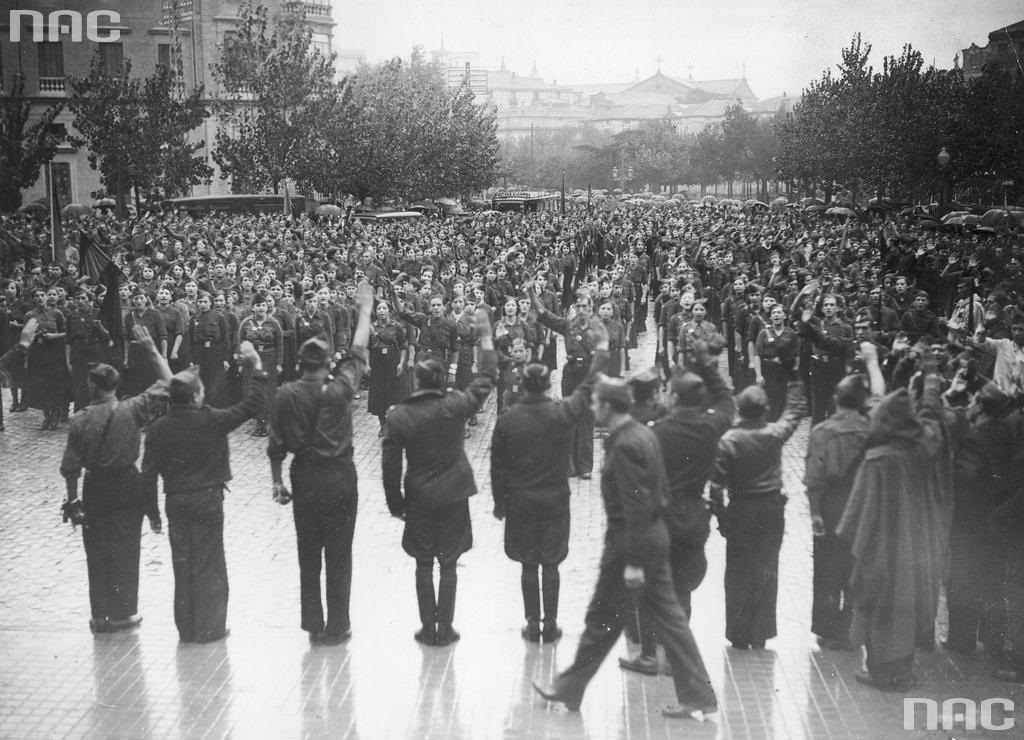
Zaragoza, late 1936

Comín did not enter the Carlist wartime executive and is neither listed as taking part in key Traditionalist meetings, intended to discuss the threat of looming amalgamation into a state party. Personally he remained on good terms with local Falange; this caused anxiety of the Falangist leader, Manuel Hedilla, who fired his Zaragoza chief due to his too friendly relations with the Requetés. Following issuing of the Unification Decree Comín seemed to have complied and in May 1937 was nominated sub-jefe regional of Falange Española Tradicionalista. It appears, however, that he strove to turn Aragon into a Carlist fiefdom very much like the neighboring Navarre, influencing local appointments and engaging in Traditionalist and Nationalist propaganda. Circumstances of his death are not clear. According to most sources he was killed in a car accident in Zaragoza in March 1939; according to some he developed serious lung problems following a car accident suffered at the Teruel front and died due to pneumonia following 11 days in bed.

== Reception and legacy ==
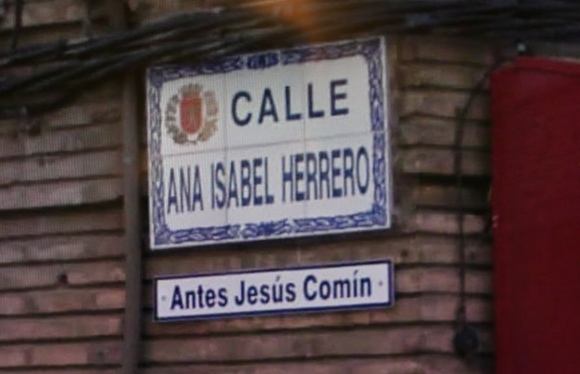
former Comín street, Zaragoza

During his lifetime Comín gained recognition mostly locally in Zaragoza and Aragón; it was only the Carlist press which hailed him nationwide as a great orator and "catedrático". His very belligerent interventions in the Cortes at times gained him attention beyond the Traditionalist realm, e.g. when he triggered a governmental fact-finding mission to Canfranc. His zeal earned him also some ridicule on part of the hostile press, which did not miss the opportunity to quote him declare in excitement that "yo soy Jesús Comín, y les doy mi nombre porque cuando digo una cosa me gusta responder de ella", drawing mocking comparisons to Nero or Napoleon. His funeral was attended by a number of Francoist dignitaries, including general Moscardo and general Monasterio. José María Comín tried to honor his brother's name in the local Círculo Cultural Español, as Círculo Carlista was renamed during early Francoism.

Except that in the 1960s one of the streets in Zaragoza was named after him, Comín fell into oblivion. There are various scientific institutions of the country which acknowledge members of the Comín dynasty of lawyers and scholars, though it is Bienvenido and Francisco Javier rather than Jesús. There is no mention of Jesús Comín on any of the official Carlist sites, be it this of the Sixtinos, Carloctavistas, CTC or Partido Carlista. He served as a point of reference for some works focusing on his son Alfonso Carlos Comín; typically he is presented as a reactionary whose influence had to be overcome be his son in order to become a progressive humanist. There is a fairly substantial entry dedicated to Comín in Gran Enciclopedia Aragonesa. The Comín Street was renamed in 2009; the change was hailed in local media as a revenge of democracy against Carlism. The author of a triumphant press note claimed that 99,9% of the passers-by had no idea who Jesús Comín was, but he still made the point of underlining that such a figure of "untold reactionary" and a "Tejero of 1936" should be kept in oblivion.

== See also ==
- Carlism
- Requetés
- Bienvenido Comín Sarté
- Alfonso Carlos Comín Ros
- Antoni Comín Oliveres
