= Council of the Republic (Catalonia) =

Catalan nationalist organisation

Council of the Catalan Republic
- Consell de la República
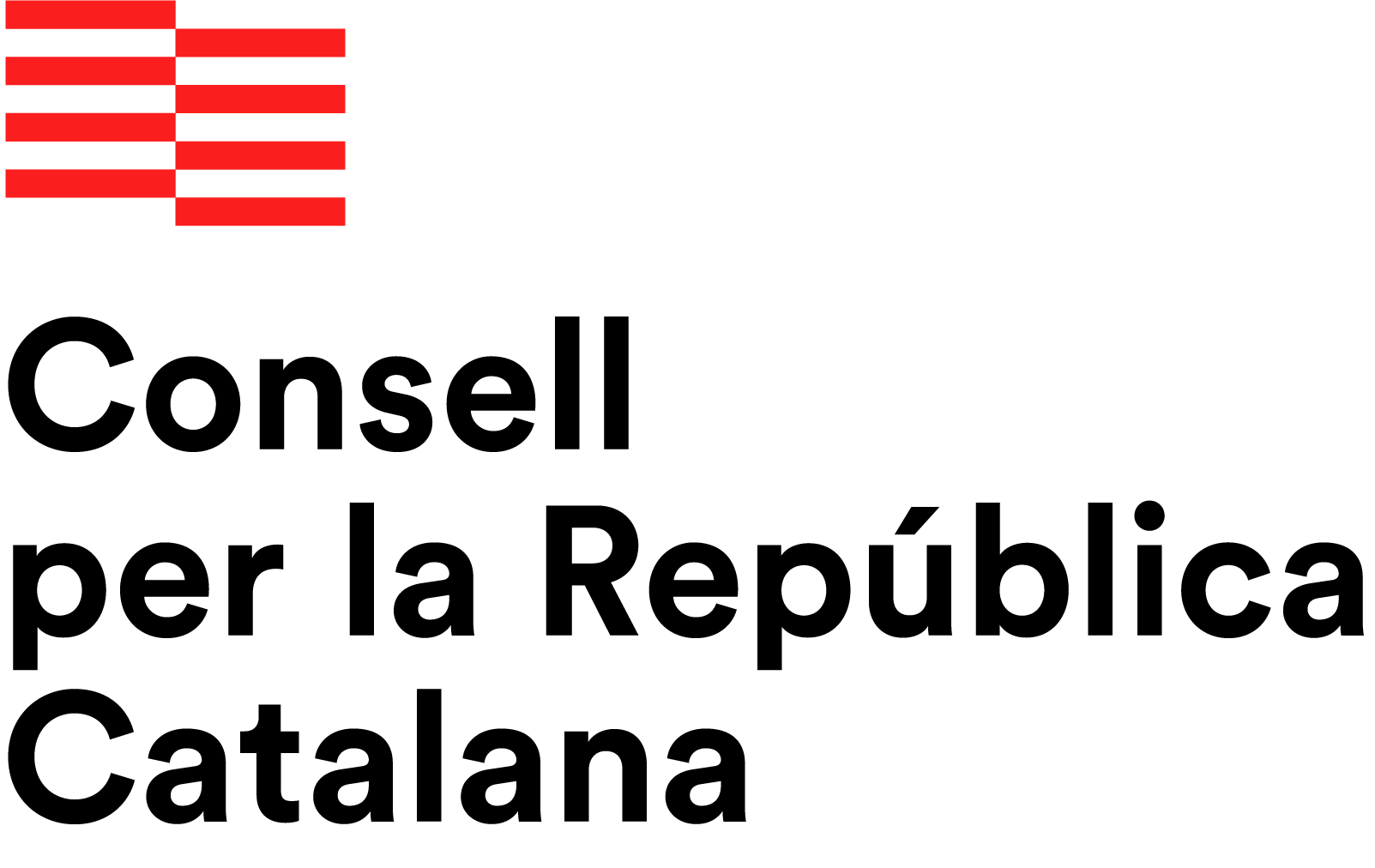
- Formation: October 30, 2018; 7 years ago (presentation in Barcelona); December 8, 2018; 7 years ago (presentation in Brussels)
- Founded at: Barcelona
- Type: Organization
- Purpose: Advocating for Catalan independence
- Location: Brussels, Belgium
- President: Jordi Domingo i Garcia-Milà
- Coordinator: Toni Comín
- Website: www.consellrepublica.cat

The Council of the Republic (Catalan: Consell de la República), formerly known as the Council for the Catalan Republic (Catalan: Consell per la República Catalana), is a Catalan nationalist and pro-independence political organisation, advocacy group and self-proclaimed government-in-exile, which seeks to organise and promote the Catalan independence movement following the failure of the 2017 Catalan declaration of independence. It also promotes the defence of civil and political rights.

The council consists of the president and seven members. Until 2025, the organisation was headed by former President of the Catalan Government Carles Puigdemont, who was succeeded by Jordi Domingo i Garcia-Milà following internal elections.

The Council was presented on 30 October 2018 in the Catalan Government Palace, Barcelona, by Carles Puigdemont, Toni Comín, Quim Torra and Pere Aragonès. The event was attended by representatives and deputies, as well as regional ministers and senior government officials, mayors and representatives of civic organisations.

The Council for the Republic was presented on 8 December 2018 at the KVS Flemish Theater in Brussels. The event was attended by Quim Torra, Carles Puigdemont, Toni Comín, Clara Ponsatí, Lluís Puig and Meritxell Serret.

== See also ==
- Puigdemont Government
