= Ada Ferrer-i-Carbonell =

Catalan economist

- Born: 17 November 1971 (age 54); Sabadell, Spain

Academic background
- Education: Rensselaer Polytechnic Institute; University of Amsterdam

Academic work
- Discipline: Economist
- Sub-discipline: Econometrics
- Institutions: Barcelona School of Economics; IZA Institute of Labor Economics

Ada Ferrer-i-Carbonell (born 17 November 1971 in Sabadell, Spain) is a Spanish economist and professor at the Barcelona School of Economics, tenured scientist at CSIC-IAE, MOVE research fellow, and a research fellow at the IZA Institute of Labor Economics. She was an associate editor of the Journal of Economic Behavior and Organization and currently is a member of the London School of Economics-based World Wellbeing Panel. She holds two PhDs in economics, one from Rensselaer Polytechnic Institute in Troy, New York, and the other from the Tinbergen Institute and the University of Amsterdam.

After earning her PhD at the University of Amsterdam, she held several positions there including a VENI fellowship from the Dutch National Science Foundation.

== Research and publications ==
Her current interests concern individual welfare (using subjective measures of well-being) analysis, health, income, and risk attitudes.

Her research focuses on econometrics, measures of welfare and happiness, environmental economics and behavioral economics. She has published two books about happiness measurement. Her first book named Happiness Quantified is written jointly with Bernard M.S. Praag and was published in 2004 by Oxford University Press. Her second book Happiness Economics: A New Road to Measuring and Comparing Happiness (Foundations and Trends(r) in Microeconomics)was published in 2011 jointly with Bernard M.S. Praag. Her work has been widely cited and she counts over 11,000 citations in economics and scientific publications including Nature. Her research has been featured in media outlets such as The Economist and she has been interviewed on Catalan national radio, and she has been the subject in the newspaper La Vanguardia.
