= El Ciervo =

Cultural magazine in Spain

- Categories: Cultural magazine
- Frequency: Five times a year
- Publisher: El Ciervo 96, S.A
- Founder: Lorenzo Gomis; Roser Bofill
- Founded: 1951
- Country: Spain
- Based in: Barcelona
- Language: Spanish
- Website: El Ciervo
- ISSN: 0045-6896
- OCLC: 830988963

El Ciervo (Spanish: The Deer) is a cultural and opinion magazine based in Barcelona, Spain. Founded in 1951 the magazine is one of the longest running independent cultural and political magazines in the country.

== History and profile ==
El Ciervo was established in 1951. Its first issue appeared in Barcelona in late June 1951. Lorenzo Gomis was its cofounder and one of its directors. His wife journalist Roser Bofill is the other cofounder. The magazine is a brainchild of Claudio Colomer Marqués, director of the newspaper El Correo Catalán. He also financed the magazine for the first five years. It previously came out monthly. It is published by El Ciervo 96, S.A, five times a year.

The magazine has no ties with media groups or political parties. During the formative years the magazine adhered to liberal Christian stance, but later it abandoned it. At the same time the magazine was one of the media outlets, which expressed a culture of dissidence. By the late 1950s it began to adopt a progressive stance. The headquarters of the magazine was seized by the Francoist forces. During the 1970s it supported the democratic transition to end Francoist era. On 4 July 1972 the Adolfo Hitler Commando invaded the headquarters of the magazine. Following the transition the magazine reduced its interest in politics, and mostly covered cultural issues.

El Ciervo covers articles about all topics related to society. Enrique Sordo was among the early contributors.
