= Jordi Graupera =

Catalan philosopher

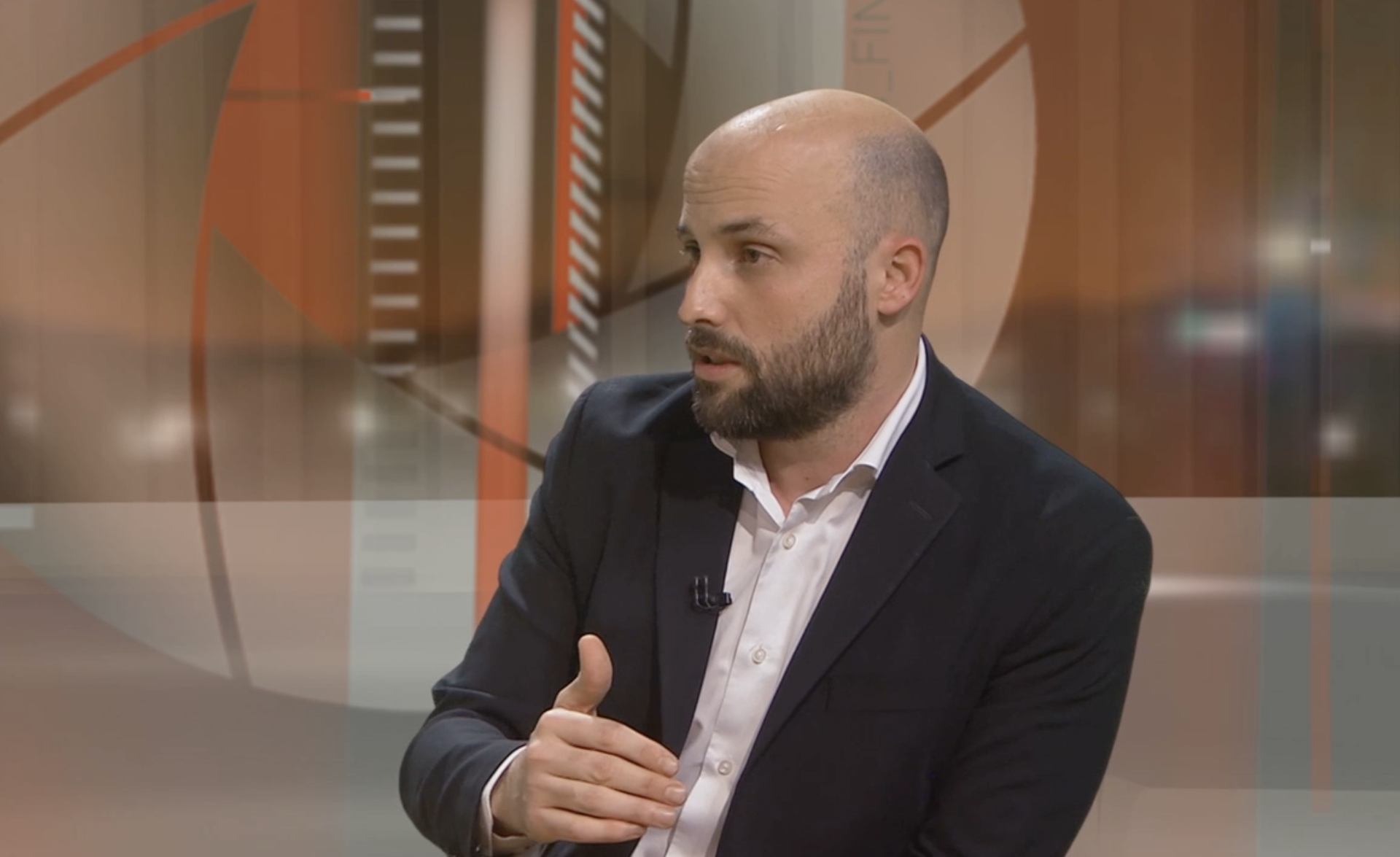
- Jordi Graupera
- Born: May 4, 1981 (age 45); Barcelona, Spain
- Occupations: Professor and journalist
- Political party: Alhora (since 2024)

Jordi Graupera i Garcia-Milà (born 1980, Barcelona) is a Catalan political philosopher and politician. His research focuses on self-determination and international relations. He works as a philosophy professor at the Ramon Llull University in Barcelona, teaching on globalization, cultural traditions, and creative thinking. He also teaches the history of social thought at the Open University of Catalonia.

== Biography ==
He received a PhD in Political Philosophy from The New School for Social Research with a critique of the liberal theory of the state, and has taught at Saint Francis College, NYU, Parsons School of Architecture and Design, and Princeton University, where he did his post-doc.

He has worked a journalist for several media in Catalonia and in Spain. In 2019, he ran for Mayor of Barcelona, but his political platform, Barcelona és capital, did not get more than 5% of the votes, the threshold for representation in Barcelona City Council.

His research interests focus on contemporary political theory, early modern political philosophy, and the history of culture in the Iberian Peninsula. He is the author of Una idea per Barcelona and La Supèrbia (available in English in The Seven Deadly Sins). He has worked as a journalist, op-ed writer, cultural critic, correspondent and political analyst. At Stanford, he has held the Josep Pla Visiting Professorship in Catalan Studies in the Department of Iberian and Latin American Cultures.

A long-form piece by Graupera about the final university course taught by philosopher Richard J. Bernstein was published in The New Yorker in January 2023.

In 2024, Graupera and Clara Ponsatí launched Alhora, a new political party in favour of Catalan independence but critical of existing pro-independence parties. Graupera was placed second on the party list for the 2024 elections to the Catalan Parliament, however he was not elected, as the party failed win enough votes to gain any representation in the Parliament.

In november 2026 he runs for the 2026 Spanish general election. The election campaign slogan is "Fora Espanya" ("Out with Spain").

== Electoral history ==
Electoral history of Jordi Graupera
Election	Constituency	Party	Alliance	No.	Result
2019 local	Barcelona	Barcelona is Capital	Catalonia Primaries	1	Not elected
2024 regional	Province of Barcelona	Alhora	None	2	Not elected

== Publications ==
- Converses amb Xavier Sala i Martín (CAT: DAU, 2008 ISBN 978-84-935228-4-1) (in Catalan and Spanish) (ES: Planeta, 2010 ISBN 978-8408091684)
- Cartes Ianquis de Carles Boix (collaborator) (A contravent, 2012 ISBN 978-84-93972-28-8)
- Barcelona. La ciutat del present. (Ajuntament de Barcelona. 2013). ISBN 978-84-9850-493-4)
- Una vida articulada per Josep Maria Espinàs (prologue) (La Campana, 2013 ISBN 978-84-96735-79-8) (in Catalan)
- Una idea per Barcelona (Destino, 2018)
- La supèrbia (Fragmenta, 2020), translated to English by Mara Faye Lethem and published as part of The Seven Deadly Sins
