= Article 155 of the Constitution of Spain =

Article 155 of the Constitution of Spain grants the government of Spain a coercive mechanism to force an autonomous community to comply with the law when it severely contravenes the Constitution of Spain or other laws, or when its actions seriously threaten the general interest of Spain. The article is inspired by the mechanism of "federal coercion" (Bundeszwang) provided in article 37 of the Basic Law of the Federal Republic of Germany.

This legal provision became notable after it was activated by the Spanish Senate to dismiss the Government of Catalonia and dissolve the Parliament of Catalonia after the proclamation of a Catalan declaration of independence on 27 October 2017. The Constitutional Court ruled the declaration to be null and void, an opinion shared by a significant number of legal scholars. The declaration was not recognized by the international community.

In a ruling issued on 5 July 2019, the Constitutional Court established that Article 155 is an "exceptional and subsidiary remedy" that must be limited in time. There is no possibility of a general and permanent suspension of self-government, as it would contravene the right to autonomy guaranteed in the Constitution.

1. If an Autonomous Community does not fulfil the obligations imposed upon it by the Constitution or other laws, or acts in a way seriously prejudicing the general interests of Spain, the Government, after lodging a complaint with the President of the Autonomous Community and failing to receive satisfaction therefore, may, following approval granted by an absolute majority of the Senate, take the measures necessary in order to compel the latter forcibly to meet said obligations, or in order to protect the above-mentioned general interests.

2. With a view to implementing the measures provided in the foregoing clause, the Government may issue instructions to all the authorities of the Autonomous Communities.

Article 155 of the Spanish Constitution.

== See also ==
- Constitution of Spain
- Politics of Spain
