= Centrem =

- Founder: Àngels Chacón
- Founded: 11 January 2022 (launched); 12 March 2022 (congress)
- Registered: 28 December 2021
- Dissolved: 14 June 2023
- Split from: Catalan European Democratic Party
- Headquarters: C/ Pep Munné, 12; 08480, L'Ametlla del Vallès
- Ideology: Liberalism; Catalan nationalism Pro-Europeanism
- Political position: Centre-right

Website
- centremcatalunya.cat

Centrem (English: "Let's focus") was a Catalan nationalist centre-right political party in Catalonia, announced on 11 January 2022 by former Catalan European Democratic Party (PDeCAT) secretary-general Àngels Chacón, in an attempt to unify the parties in the political space left by the dissolution of Convergence and Union (CiU), and the ascendence of Catalan President Carles Puigdemont on the Together for Catalonia party founded in July 2020, which emerged from an homonymous 2017 electoral alliance. The party was supported by Chacón's former party, the PDeCAT, as well as Convergents (CNV), Democratic League (LD) and Free (Lliures), and contested the 2023 Spanish local elections in Catalonia. The Nationalist Party of Catalonia (PNC) of former PDeCAT coordinator-general Marta Pascal has openly rejected joining the Centrem platform.
