= Convergents (political party) =

- Abbreviation: CNV
- President: Germà Gordó
- Secretary-General: Teresa Maria Pitarch
- Founded: 7 November 2017
- Registered: 17 November 2017
- Split from: Catalan European Democratic Party
- Headquarters: Rambla Catalunya, 18, 6ª 08007, Barcelona
- Ideology: Catalan nationalism Christian democracy Liberalism; Social democracy
- Political position: Centre
- Colors: Blue; Orange
- Local government (2019–2023): 21 / 9,077

Website
- www.convergents.org

Convergents (Catalan: Convergents, CNV) is a Catalan political party founded in November 2017 by former regional justice minister in Artur Mas's second government Germà Gordó, who had left the Catalan European Democratic Party (PDeCAT) in June 2017. The party includes former Democratic Convergence of Catalonia (CDC) members Teresa Maria Pitarch and (until 2020) Sílvia Requena.

Convergents identifies itself as a party of "pragmatic sovereigntists".

== History ==
The party was formed shortly before the 2017 Catalan regional election by former regional minister of justice Germà Gordó, who had left the Catalan European Democratic Party (PDeCAT) in June 2017 following pressures from other parties in the Junts pel Sí parliamentary group for Gordó to vacate his seat after his indictment in the 3% corruption scandal affecting the late Democratic Convergence of Catalonia (CDC). It was initially founded as the New Convergence (Catalan: Nova Convergència) political platform, then registered as a party in the interior ministry under the name "Convergents". However, the party's lists failed to pass validation by the Electoral Commission and were not proclaimed, resulting in the party being ultimately excluded from the election. In 2019, the party contested the April general election and the May local elections—signing local alliances with United to Advance (Els Units) and Free (Lliures) in Sant Cugat del Vallés and Castelldefels—obtaining poor results. In July 2020, Sílvia Requena left the party to become the Democratic League (DC)'s new secretary-general.

Ahead of the 2021 Catalan regional election, the party started exploring possible alliances with the PDeCAT, LD and "The Country of Tomorrow" platform (later to become the Nationalist Party of Catalonia (PNC)). On 15 July 2020, it was announced that the party would be forming an electoral alliance with Lliures and LD to contest the upcoming regional election, on the basis of a joint programme pushing for an expansion of Catalan self-government and a solidary fiscal agreement, as well as opposing unilateralism.

== Electoral performance ==
=== Cortes Generales ===
==== Nationwide ====
Cortes Generales
Election	Congress					Senate		Leading candidate	Status in legislature
Election	Votes	%	#	Seats	+/–	Seats	+/–	Leading candidate	Status in legislature
2019 (Apr)	2,541	0.01%	39th	0 / 350	0	0 / 208	0	Sílvia Requena	No seats

==== Regional breakdown ====
Election	Catalonia						
Election	Congress					Senate	
Election	Votes	%	#	Seats	+/–	Seats	+/–
2019 (Apr)	2,541	0.06%	13th	0 / 48	0	0 / 16	0
