= 2021 Catalan regional election =

Election in the Spanish region of Catalonia

- 14 February 2021

All 135 seats in the Parliament of Catalonia 68 seats needed for a majority
- Opinion polls
- Registered: 5,624,067 ▲1.3%
- Turnout: 2,884,845 (51.3%) ▼27.8 pp
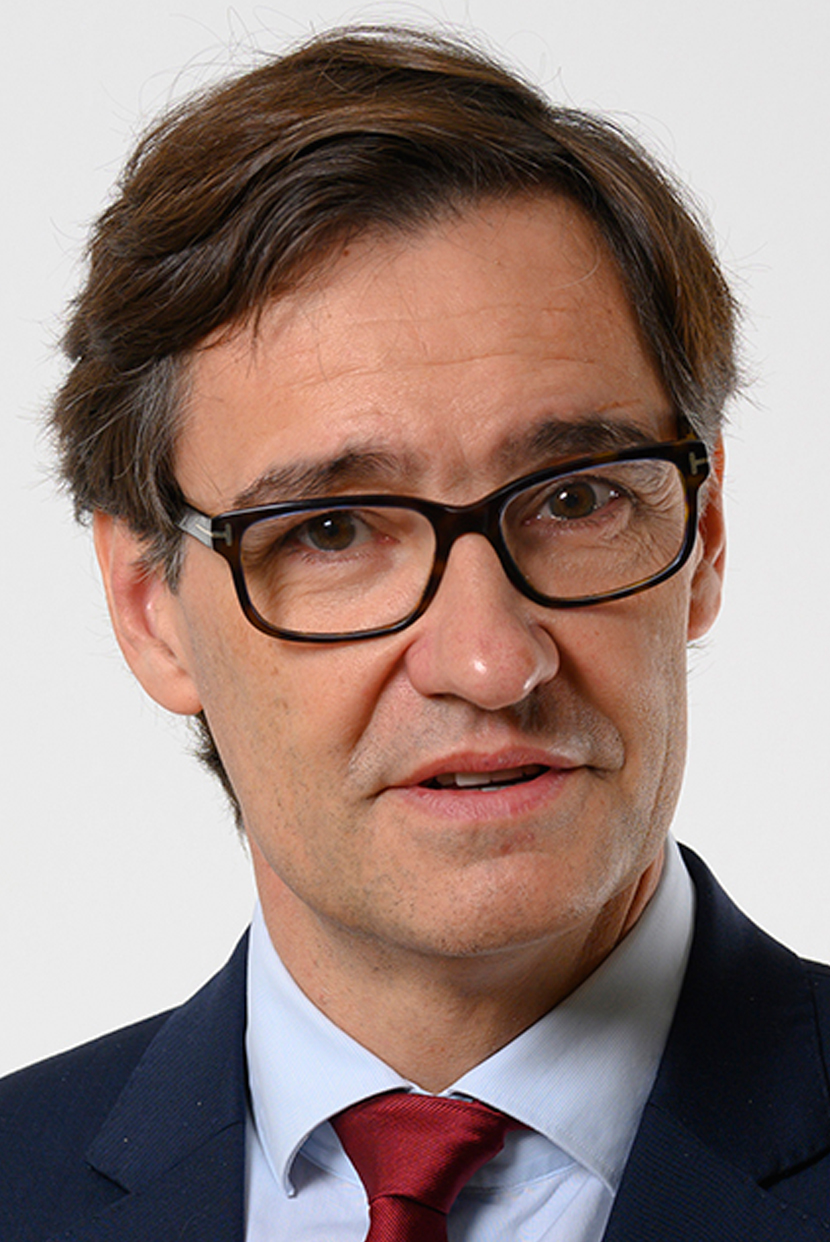

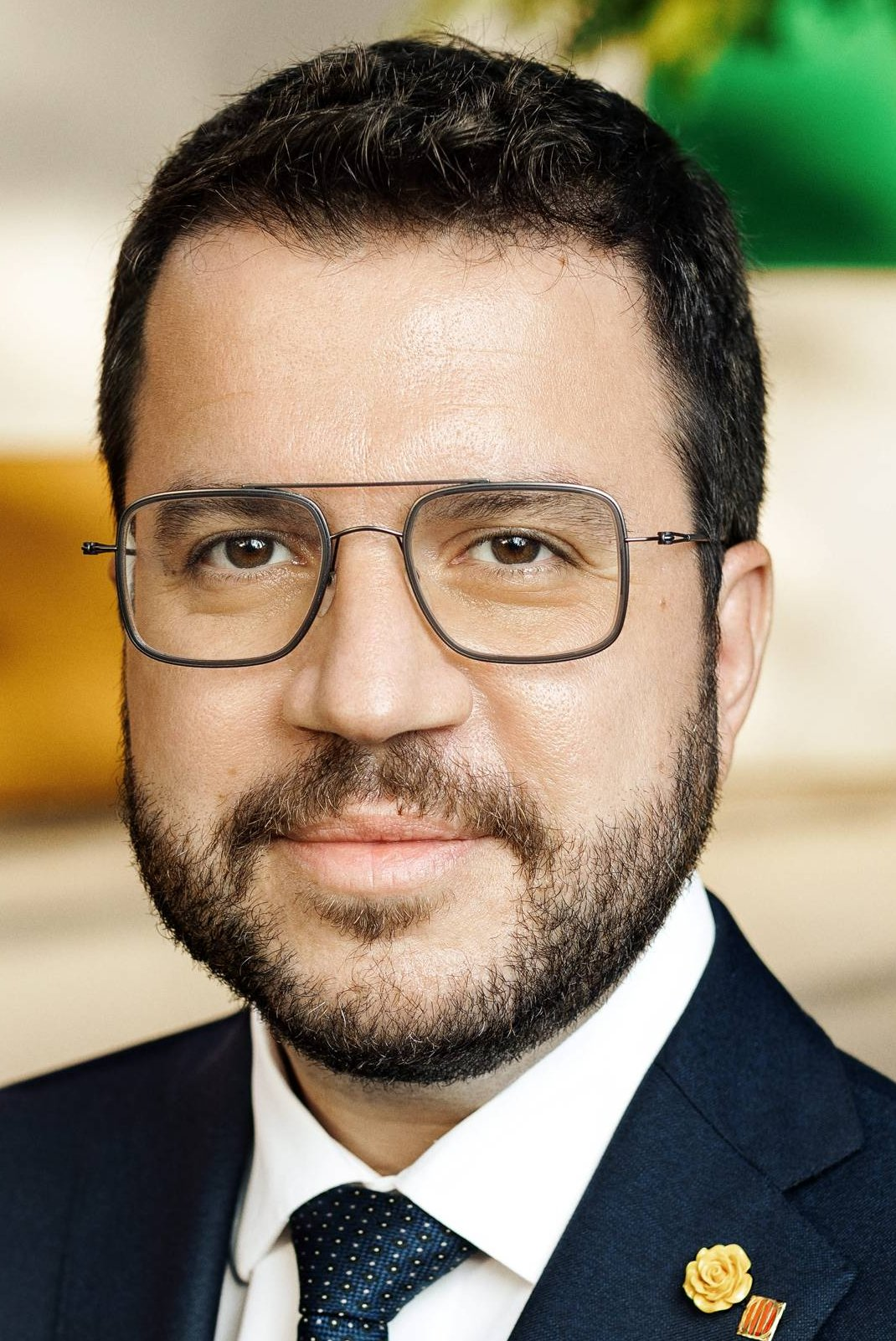

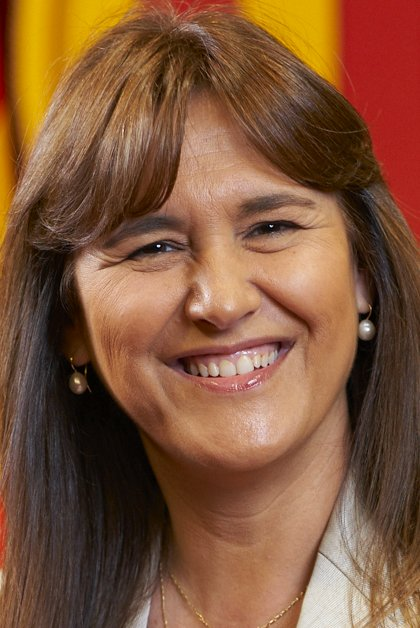

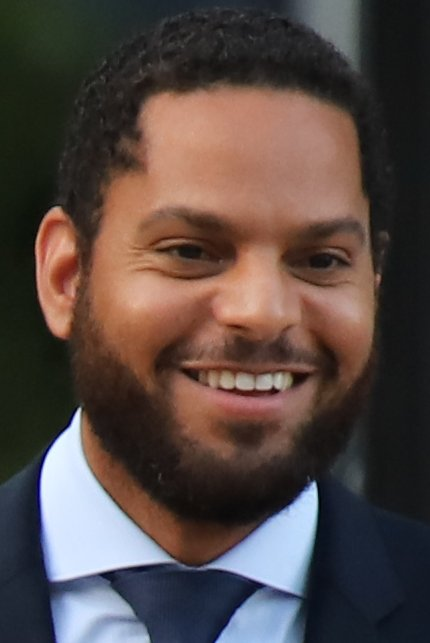

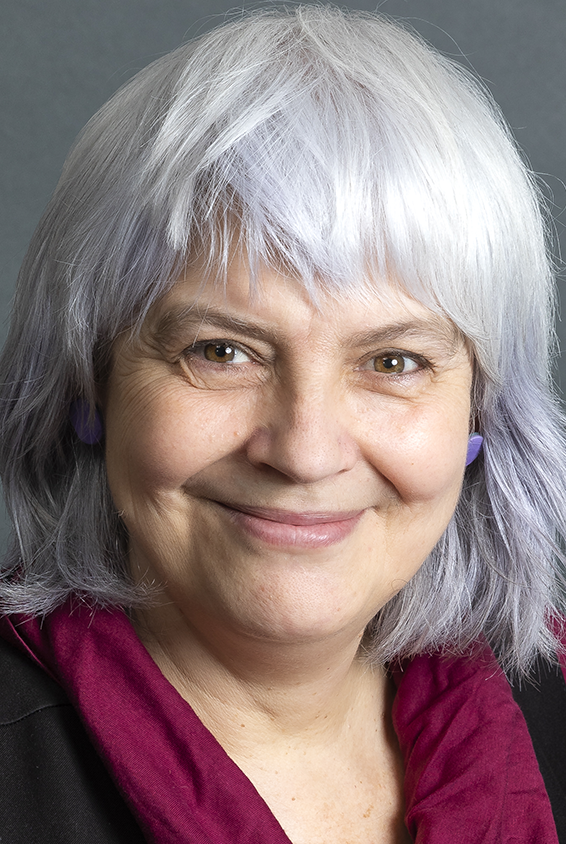

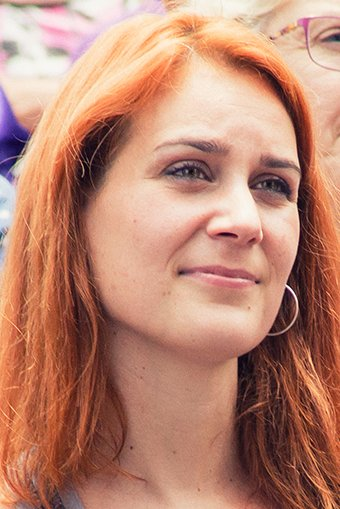

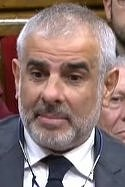

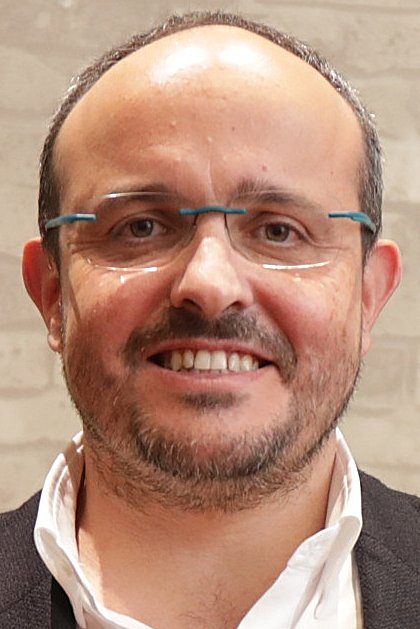

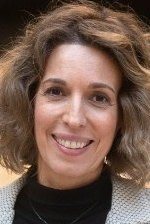
	First party	Second party	Third party
Leader	Salvador Illa	Pere Aragonès	Laura Borràs
Party	PSC–PSOE	ERC	JxCat
Leader since	30 December 2020	20 November 2020	29 November 2020
Leader's seat	Barcelona	Barcelona	Barcelona
Last election	17 seats, 13.9%	32 seats, 21.4%	20 seats (JuntsxCat) (Note: Within the JuntsxCat alliance in the 2017 election. Totals for the new JxCat refer to the 20 independent candidates elected within JuntsxCat's lists, who ended up joining Puigdemont-aligned parties such as CNxR or AxR and, eventually, JxCat itself. On the other hand, and following a dispute between the two parties over the JuntsxCat's brand, the PDeCAT preserved the late's electoral rights and financing over the claim presented by JxCat.)
Seats won	33	33	32
Seat change	▲16	▲1	▲12
Popular vote	654,766	605,581	570,539
Percentage	23.0%	21.3%	20.1%
Swing	▲9.1 pp	▼0.1 pp	n/a
	Fourth party	Fifth party	Sixth party
Leader	Ignacio Garriga	Dolors Sabater	Jéssica Albiach
Party	Vox	CUP–G	ECP–PEC
Leader since	10 August 2020	12 December 2020	18 September 2018
Leader's seat	Barcelona	Barcelona	Barcelona
Last election	Did not contest	4 seats, 4.5%	8 seats, 7.5%
Seats won	11	9	8
Seat change	▲11	▲5	0
Popular vote	218,121	189,924	195,345
Percentage	7.7%	6.7%	6.9%
Swing	New party	▲2.2 pp	▼0.6 pp
	Seventh party	Eighth party	Ninth party
Leader	Carlos Carrizosa	Alejandro Fernández	Àngels Chacón
Party	Cs	PP	PDeCAT
Leader since	19 August 2020	10 November 2018	2 November 2020
Leader's seat	Barcelona	Barcelona	Barcelona (lost)
Last election	36 seats, 25.4%	4 seats, 4.2%	14 seats (JuntsxCat)
Seats won	6	3	0
Seat change	▼30	▼1	▼14
Popular vote	158,606	109,452	77,229
Percentage	5.6%	3.8%	2.7%
Swing	▼19.8 pp	▼0.4 pp	n/a
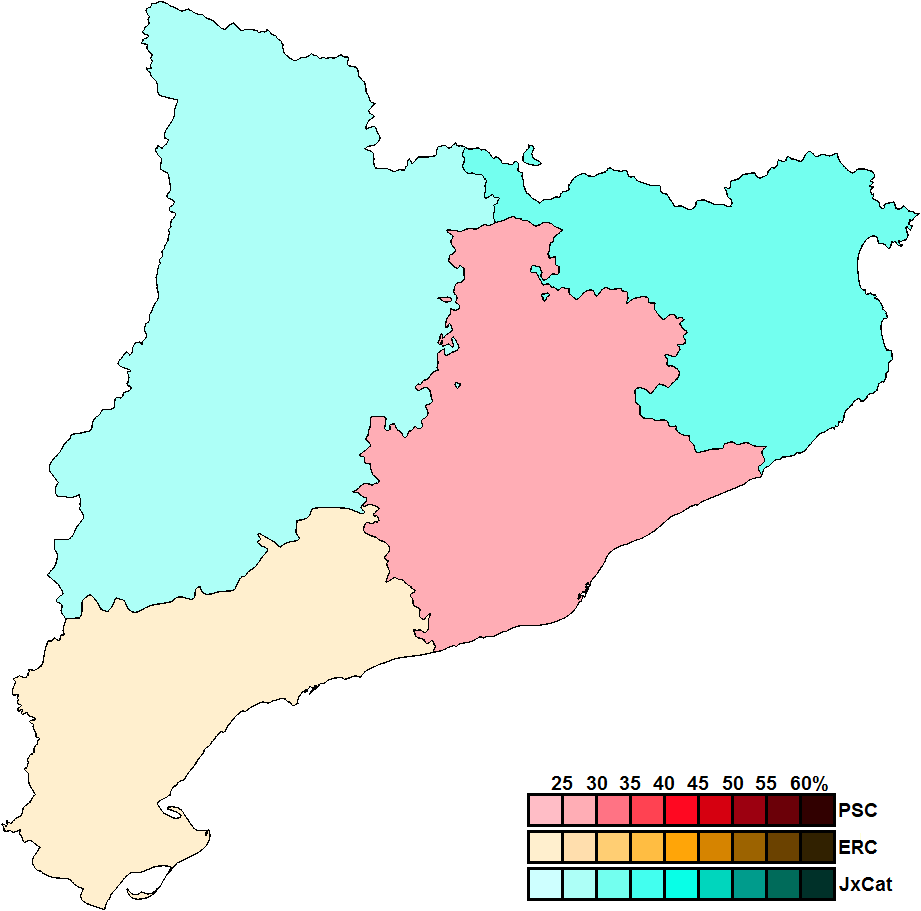
President before election
Pere Aragonès (acting)
ERC
President after election
Pere Aragonès
ERC

A regional election was held in Catalonia on 14 February 2021 to elect the 13th/14th Parliament of the autonomous community. All 135 seats in the Parliament were up for election.

After the 2017 election, pro-Catalan independence parties secured a parliamentary majority, electing Quim Torra as new Catalan president after attempts to have Carles Puigdemont and Jordi Turull elected to the office were foiled by Spanish courts. However, in December 2019 Torra was disqualified by the High Court of Justice of Catalonia (TSJC) from holding any elected office and/or from exercising government powers for disobeying the Central Electoral Commission (JEC)'s rulings in the April 2019 Spanish general election campaign. Torra remained as president as he appealed the ruling, but was stripped from his status as legislator in the Catalan parliament. A snap election loomed over the horizon for several months as Torra announced his will to call one after the court rulings, but the outbreak of the COVID-19 pandemic in Spain stalled these plans. On 28 September 2020, the TSJC's ruling was upheld by the Supreme Court of Spain, finally disqualifying Torra from office and paving the way for a regional election to be called for early 2021.

Puigdemont announced his intention to lead the lists of his new Together for Catalonia (JxCat) party into the election, with former regional Culture minister Laura Borràs being selected as presidential candidate. Concurrently, in a move widely seen as Prime Minister Pedro Sánchez's personal bet for his party to obtain a strong performance in the election, the Socialists' Party of Catalonia (PSC) selected health minister Salvador Illa, who had been at the helm of the Spanish government's response to the ongoing COVID-19 pandemic, as its leading candidate.

Pro-independence parties gained a majority of the votes for the first time in an election and increased their parliamentary majority, though they lost over 600,000 votes from the previous election amidst the lowest voter turnout in history, at just 51.3%. The PSC under Salvador Illa emerged as the most voted political party while tying in seats as the largest parliamentary force for the first time in history. The far-right Vox placed fourth and entered Parliament for first time, winning 11 seats, to the collapse of both Citizens (which placed first in the previous election and fell to seventh, losing 30 seats) and the People's Party (which worsened its 2017 result, already its worst in history). The Catalan European Democratic Party (PDeCAT), the successor of the once-dominant Democratic Convergence of Catalonia (CDC), lost parliamentary representation after they failed to clear the electoral threshold. PDeCAT's extraparliamentary performance partially overturned the record for wasted votes (in vote share, but not raw votes) that had been set by CDC's erstwhile coalition partner, the Democratic Union of Catalonia (UDC), in 2015.

== Overview ==
Under the 2006 Statute of Autonomy, the Parliament of Catalonia was the unicameral legislature of the homonymous autonomous community, having legislative power in devolved matters, as well as the ability to grant or withdraw confidence from a regional president. The electoral and procedural rules were supplemented by national law provisions.

=== Date ===
The term of the Parliament of Catalonia expired four years after the date of its previous election, unless it was dissolved earlier. The election was required to be called no later than 15 days before the scheduled expiration date of parliament, with election day taking place between 40 and 60 days from the call. The previous election was held on 21 December 2017, which meant that the chamber's term would have expired on 21 December 2021. The election was required to be called no later than 6 December 2021, setting the latest possible date for election day on 4 February 2022.

The regional president had the prerogative to dissolve the Parliament of Catalonia at any given time and call a snap election, provided that no motion of no confidence was in process and that dissolution did not occur before one year after a previous one under this procedure. In the event of an investiture process failing to elect a regional president within a two-month period from the first ballot, the Parliament was to be automatically dissolved and a fresh election called.

On 29 January 2020, President Quim Torra announced that he would be calling a snap election at some point throughout 2020 once the budgetary procedure was finalized in Parliament, after a government crisis erupted between Together for Catalonia (Junts) and Republican Left of Catalonia (ERC) over Torra's being stripped of his status as legislator, resulting from a court ruling for disobeying the Central Electoral Commission by not withdrawing partisan symbols from the Palau de la Generalitat's facade and not guaranteeing the institution's neutrality during the April 2019 Spanish general election campaign.

While the budget's parliamentary transaction timetable was due to be over by 18 March (meaning that an election could be held as soon as Monday, 11 May, if called immediately, or 17 May if the long-term tradition of holding elections on a Sunday was kept)—members from both Junts and ERC hinted that the election could be delayed until after the summer, to be held in September–October 2020. The risk existed that, in the meantime, the Supreme Court issued a firm ruling on Torra's disqualification that removed him from the president's office and thus deprived him of the prerogative of parliament dissolution. The announcement of a possible snap 2020 election in Catalonia had the immediate side effect of triggering an early election in the Basque Country for 5 April, as Lehendakari Iñigo Urkullu sought to distance himself from the convoluted Catalan political landscape by avoiding any interference with the Basque election, which was initially not scheduled until autumn 2020. This in turn precipitated the end of the legislature in Galicia, with regional president Alberto Núñez Feijóo announcing a snap election to be held simultaneously with the Basque one.

In July 2020, it was revealed that former Catalan president and Torra's predecessor Carles Puigdemont initially sought to have the election being held on 4 October 2020, in order for his upcoming political party to benefit from the pro-independence nostalgia of the Diada and the third anniversary of the 2017 Catalan independence referendum, which would require the Parliament to be dissolved on 12 August. However, severe COVID-19 outbreaks in the Lleida/Segrià and Barcelona metropolitan areas in mid-July forced these plans to be delayed. Torra's disqualification was confirmed in late September. The Catalan parliament chose not to appoint a replacement candidate for the regional presidency, with a parliamentary act being published on 21 October confirming such situation and starting the two month-legally established timetable until the automatic dissolution of the chamber and the election being scheduled to be held on 14 February 2021. Eventually on 21 December, acting president Pere Aragonès signed the decree dissolving the Parliament of Catalonia. The Parliament of Catalonia was officially dissolved on 22 December 2020 with the publication of the corresponding decree in the Official Journal of the Government of Catalonia (DOGC), setting election day for 14 February.

As a result of the worsening situation in Catalonia and in all of Spain because of mounting cases and deaths in the third wave of the COVID-19 pandemic, the election date was initially postponed to 30 May 2021. However, after a legal challenge over perceived irregularities in the decree, the High Court of Justice of Catalonia decided on 19 January to suspend the postponement and move the election back to the original 14 February date. This decision was confirmed on 21 January.

=== Electoral system ===
Voting for the Parliament was based on universal suffrage, comprising all Spanish nationals over 18 years of age, registered in Catalonia and with full political rights, provided that they had not been deprived of the right to vote by a final sentence. (Note: Amendments in 2018 granted the right to vote to those legally incapacitated.) Additionally, non-resident citizens were required to apply for voting, a system known as "begged" voting (Spanish: Voto rogado).

The Parliament of Catalonia had a minimum of 100 and a maximum of 150 seats, with electoral provisions fixing its size at 135. All were elected in four multi-member constituencies—corresponding to the provinces of Barcelona, Girona, Lleida and Tarragona, each of which was assigned a fixed number of seats—using the D'Hondt method and closed-list proportional voting, with a three percent-threshold of valid votes (including blank ballots) in each constituency. The use of this electoral method resulted in a higher effective threshold depending on district magnitude and vote distribution.

As a result of the aforementioned allocation, each Parliament constituency was entitled the following seats:

Seats	Constituencies
85	Barcelona
18	Tarragona
17	Girona
15	Lleida

The law did not provide for by-elections to fill vacant seats; instead, any vacancies arising after the proclamation of candidates and during the legislative term were filled by the next candidates on the party lists or, when required, by designated substitutes.

=== Outgoing parliament ===
The table below shows the composition of the parliamentary groups in the chamber at the time of dissolution.

Parliamentary composition in December 2020
Groups	Parties	Legislators	
Groups	Parties	Seats	Total
Citizens's Parliamentary Group	Cs	36	36
Together for Catalonia's Parliamentary Group	JxCat	24	34
Together for Catalonia's Parliamentary Group	PDeCAT	5	34
Together for Catalonia's Parliamentary Group	AxR	3	34
Together for Catalonia's Parliamentary Group	EV–AV	1	34
Together for Catalonia's Parliamentary Group	IdE	1	34
Republican Parliamentary Group	ERC	30	32
Republican Parliamentary Group	DC	2	32
Socialists' and United to Advance; Parliamentary Group	PSC	15	17
Socialists' and United to Advance; Parliamentary Group	Els Units	2	17
Catalonia in Common–We Can's; Parliamentary Group	CatComú	4	8
Catalonia in Common–We Can's; Parliamentary Group	Podem	4	8
Mixed Group	CUP	4	8
Mixed Group	PP	4	8

== Parties and candidates ==
The electoral law allowed for parties and federations registered in the interior ministry, alliances and groupings of electors to present lists of candidates. Parties and federations intending to form an alliance were required to inform the relevant electoral commission within 10 days of the election call, whereas groupings of electors needed to secure the signature of at least one percent of the electorate in the constituencies for which they sought election, disallowing electors from signing for more than one list. Concurrently, parties, federations or alliances that had not obtained a parliamentary mandate at the preceding election were required to secure the signature of at least 0.1 percent of electors in the aforementioned constituencies. Additionally, a balanced composition of men and women was required in the electoral lists, so that candidates of either sex made up at least 40 percent of the total composition.

Below is a list of the main parties and alliances which contested the election:

Candidacy	Parties and alliances	Leading candidate	Ideology	Previous result		Gov.	Ref.
Candidacy	Parties and alliances	Leading candidate	Ideology	Vote %	Seats	Gov.	Ref.
Cs	List: Citizens–Party of the Citizenry (Cs)	Carlos Carrizosa	Liberalism	25.4%	36	No	
JxCat	List: Together for Catalonia (JxCat) – Action for the Republic (AxR) – Left Independentists (IdE) – Independence Rally (RI.cat); Democrats of Catalonia (DC); Left Movement (MES); Catalan Solidarity for Independence (SI)	Laura Borràs	Catalan independence Populism	21.7% (Note: Results for JuntsxCat in the 2017 election.)	34	Yes	
PDeCAT	List: Catalan European Democratic Party (PDeCAT); Convergents (CNV)	Àngels Chacón	Catalan independence Liberalism	21.7%	34	No	
ERC	List: Republican Left of Catalonia (ERC)	Pere Aragonès	Catalan independence Left-wing nationalism Social democracy	21.4%	32	Yes	
PSC–PSOE	List: Socialists' Party of Catalonia (PSC–PSOE); United to Advance (Els Units)	Salvador Illa	Social democracy	13.9%	17	No	
ECP–PEC	List: Catalonia in Common (CatComú) – Barcelona in Common (BComú) – United Left Catalonia (EUCat) – Equo (Equo); In Common We Can (ECP); We Can (Podem)	Jéssica Albiach	Left-wing populism Direct democracy Eco-socialism	7.5%	8	No	
CUP–G	List: Popular Unity Candidacy (CUP) – Forward–Socialist Organization of National Liberation (Endavant–OSAN) – Free People (PL–PPCC) – Internationalist Struggle (LI–CI); Let's Reverse (Capgirem); Guanyem Catalunya (Guanyem); Pirates of Catalonia (Pirata.cat)	Dolors Sabater	Catalan independence Anti-capitalism; Socialism	4.5%	4	No	
PP	List: People's Party (PP); Barcelona for Change (BCN Canvi)	Alejandro Fernández	Conservatism; Christian democracy	4.2%	4	No	
Vox	List: Vox (Vox)	Ignacio Garriga	Right-wing populism Ultranationalism; National conservatism	Did not contest		No	

With the growing likelihood of a snap election from early 2020 onwards, speculation arose that both Citizens (Cs) and the People's Party (PP) would try to form a Navarra Suma-inspired electoral alliance of "constitutionalist" political forces. Far-right party Vox discarded itself from joining any such coalition and announced that it would run on its own instead. On 31 January 2020, Cs spokesperson in the Congress of Deputies Inés Arrimadas hinted at the possibility of such agreement being exported to Galicia and the Basque Country as well under the "Better United" umbrella (Spanish: Mejor Unidos), excluding Vox from such arrangement. However, the heavy defeat of the PP+Cs formula in the 12 July Basque election sparked doubts within the regional PP's branch over the electoral viability of such an alliance in Catalonia. Finally, with the snap election being confirmed for 14 February 2021, it was announced that no such alliance would be formed, after the Socialists' Party of Catalonia (PSC) had declined a similar offer from Cs to join into such a platform.

In July 2020, following the failure of negotiations between the Catalan European Democratic Party (PDeCAT) and former Catalan president Carles Puigdemont for the reorganization of the post-convergent space under the Together for Catalonia (JuntsxCat) umbrella because of the former's refusal to dissolve itself as a party, Puigdemont announced the founding of a new personalist party ahead of the upcoming regional election, wrestling control over the JuntsxCat's brand away from the PDeCAT for his own use, and breaking all ties with his former party. The new party, a new Together for Catalonia (JxCat) which would advocate for the goal of achieving unilateral independence, was to be formed by the merger of the National Call for the Republic (CNxR), Action for the Republic (AxR) and splinter elements from the PDeCAT. JxCat's formation process was started on 18 July with the public presentation of its imagery. By mid-to-late July, Puigdemont's allies had been publicly calling for disgruntled members within a deeply-fractured PDeCAT to join their new JxCat party upon its founding congress, leading Independence Rally (RI.cat) to forfeit its collaboration agreement with the former, which it had maintained since 2013. From 29 August onwards and starting with the party's five senators, members from the PDeCAT aligned to Puigdemont started defecting en masse from the former, in response to it announcing a formal sue on Puigdemont for taking over the JxCat's brand, with Puigdemont himself forfeiting his PDeCAT membership on 31 August. That same day, 9 out of the 14 remaining PDeCAT MPs in the Parliament of Catalonia left the party to join JxCat.

The crisis within the post-convergent political space had also seen the founding of a new party, the Nationalist Party of Catalonia (PNC), from splinter elements of the PDeCAT opposing the idea of unilateral independence and disenchanted with Puigdemont's growing influence, with former coordinator-general Marta Pascal at its helm. On 15 July 2020, it was announced that several parties resulting from the Convergence and Union (CiU) break up, namely Free (Lliures), Convergents (CNV) and Democratic League (LD), had agreed to form an electoral alliance ahead of the upcoming regional election, with the PNC and Ramon Espadaler's United to Advance (Els Units), until then allied to the PSC, considering joining the new coalition as well. On 23 July, Lliures, CNV and LD announced the creation of a joint commission to begin the drafting of a future electoral programme and invited Units, the PNC and the "moderate" sectors still in the PDeCAT, who favoured an alliance outside of Puigdemont's sphere of influence, to join into "a broad centre alternative that included Catalanists and sovereignists." By November 2020, Units, Lliures and LD were said to be favouring an electoral agreement with the PSC instead, advocating for the establishment of a "broad Catalanist front". However, eventually, a global agreement was not reached and PSC and Units renewed their electoral alliance without Lliures and LD.

Former Prime Minister of France Manuel Valls, who had run in the 2019 Barcelona municipal election within Cs's lists and had broken up with Albert Rivera's party shortly afterwards, was also said to be considering launching his own bid for the regional election, but Arrimadas's appointment as Cs leader hinted at the possibility of both parties mending their ties and exploring a joint platform. By October 2020, Valls was reportedly uninterested in Catalan politics and was said to be planning a return to French politics, to be officialized after the 14 February regional election.

In a surprise move on 30 December 2020, PSC leader Miquel Iceta announced that he would be stepping down as his party's leading candidate in the election, instead proposing incumbent Health minister Salvador Illa, who had borne the brunt of the Spanish government's management of the COVID-19 pandemic, for the post. The move was interpreted as a high-risk gamble from the Spanish Socialist Workers' Party (PSOE), and from Prime Minister Pedro Sánchez in particular, to push for PSC's outright win in the regional election and put an end to the bloc politics that had settled down in Catalonia for the previous decade. The same day, former Cs candidate and party spokesperson in the Spanish Senate, Lorena Roldán, announced that she was defecting from the party to join the PP lists.

== Campaign ==
=== Timetable ===
The key dates are listed below (all times are CET):

- 21 December: The election decree is issued with the countersign of the acting president.
- 22 December: Formal dissolution of parliament and start of prohibition period on the inauguration of public works, services or projects.
- 25 December: Initial constitution of provincial and zone electoral commissions with judicial members.
- 28 December: Division of constituencies into polling sections and stations.
- 1 January: Deadline for parties and federations to report on their electoral alliances.
- 4 January: Deadline for electoral register consultation for the purpose of possible corrections.
- 11 January: Deadline for parties, federations, alliances, and groupings of electors to present electoral lists.
- 13 January: Publication of submitted electoral lists in the Official Journal of the Government of Catalonia (DOGC).
- ~~15 January: Election postponement to 30 May due to the evolution of the COVID-19 pandemic~~ (revoked on 19 January by the High Court of Justice of Catalonia).
- 16 January: Deadline for non-resident citizens (electors residing abroad (CERA) and citizens temporarily absent from Spain) to apply for voting.
- 18 January: Official proclamation of validly submitted electoral lists.
- 19 January: Publication of proclaimed electoral lists in the DOGC.
- 20 January: Deadline for the selection of polling station members by sortition.
- 28 January: Deadline for the appointment of non-judicial members to provincial and zone electoral commissions.
- 29 January: Official start of electoral campaigning.
- 4 February: Deadline to apply for postal voting.
- 9 February: Start of legal ban on electoral opinion polling publication; deadline for CERA citizens to vote by mail.
- 10 February: Deadline for postal and temporarily absent voting.
- 12 February: Last day of electoral campaigning; deadline for CERA voting.
- 13 February: Official election silence ("reflection day").
- 14 February: Election day (polling stations open at 9 am and close at 8 pm or once voters present in a queue at/outside the polling station at 8 pm have cast their vote); provisional vote counting.
- 17 February: Start of general vote counting, including CERA votes.
- 20 February: Deadline for the general vote counting.
- 1 March: Deadline for the proclamation of elected members.
- 5 March: Deadline for the reconvening of parliament.
- 10 April: Deadline for the publication of definitive election results in the DOGC.

=== Party slogans ===
Party or alliance	Slogan (Catalan)	Slogan (Spanish)	English translation	Ref.
Cs	« Perquè guanyem tots »	« Para que ganemos todos »	"So that we all win"	
ERC	« Al costat de la gent »	« Al lado de la gente »	"On the side of the people"	
JxCat	« Junts per fer. Junts per ser »	« Juntos para hacer. Juntos para ser »	"Together to do. Together to be."	
PSC–PSOE	« Fem-ho »	« Hagámoslo »	"Let's do it"	
PDeCAT	« Si t'ho penses, PDeCAT »	« Si te lo piensas, PDeCAT »	"If you think about it, PDeCAT"	
ECP–PEC	« El canvi que Catalunya mereix »	« El cambio que Cataluña merece »	"The change that Catalonia deserves"	
CUP–G	« Per guanyar »	« Para ganar »	"To win"	
PP	« Una Catalunya millor »	« Una Cataluña mejor »	"A better Catalonia"	
Vox	« Recuperem Catalunya »	« Recuperemos Cataluña »	"Let's get Catalonia back"	

=== Debates ===
2021 Catalan regional election debates
Date	Organizer(s)	Moderator(s)	P Present (Note: Denotes a main invitee attending the event.) S Surrogate (Note: Denotes a main invitee not attending the event, sending a surrogate in their place.) NI Not invited I Invited A Absent invitee										
Date	Organizer(s)	Moderator(s)	Cs	ERC	JxCat	PSC	PDeCAT	ECP	CUP	PP	Vox	Audience	Ref.
29 January	La Vanguardia	Enric Sierra	P Carrizosa	P Aragonès	P Borràs	P Illa	P Chacón	P Albiach	P Sabater	P Fernández	P Garriga	—	
31 January	RTVE	Xabier Fortes	P Carrizosa	P Aragonès	P Borràs	P Illa	P Chacón	P Albiach	S Riera	P Fernández	P Garriga	10.7% (242,000) (Note: The debate was broadcast nationwide on 24 Horas, obtaining an audience of 0.9% (152,000))	
5 February	Cadena SER (Aquí, amb Josep Cuní)	Josep Cuní	P Carrizosa	P Aragonès	P Borràs	P Illa	P Chacón	P Albiach	P Sabater	A	NI	—	
8 February	RTVE (El Vespre) (Note: Debate between Lleida constituency leading candidates.)	Marta Sugrañes	P Soler	P Vilalta	NI	P Ordeig	P Solsona	P Moya	P Juvillà	P Xandri	NI	—	
9 February	RTVE (El Vespre) (Note: Debate between Tarragona constituency leading candidates.)	Marta Sugrañes	P Alonso	P Sans	NI	P Ibarra	P Arza	P Jordan	P Estrada	P Rodríguez	NI	—	
9 February	CCMA	Vicent Sanchis	P Carrizosa	P Aragonès	P Borràs	P Illa	P Chacón	P Albiach	P Sabater	P Fernández	P Garriga	26.0% (601,000)	
10 February	RTVE (El Vespre) (Note: Debate between Girona constituency leading candidates.)	Marta Sugrañes	P Castel	P Jordà	NI	P Paneque	P Dulsat	P Lluch	P Cornellà	P Olmedo	NI	—	
10 February	CCMA (Més 324)	Xavier Graset	P Alonso	P Sans	P Batet	P Ibarra	P Arza	P Jordan	P Estrada	P Rodríguez	S Macián	—	
11 February	CCMA (Més 324)	Xavier Graset	P Soler	P Vilalta	P Tremosa	P Ordeig	P Solsona	P Moya	P Juvillà	P Xandri	A	—	
11 February	laSexta	Ana Pastor	P Carrizosa	P Aragonès	P Borràs	P Illa	P Chacón	P Albiach	S Estrada	P Fernández	P Garriga	19.4% (Note: The debate was broadcast nationwide, obtaining an audience of 8.0% (1,279,000).)	
12 February	CCMA (Més 324)	Xavier Graset	P Castel	P Jordà	P Geis	P Paneque	P Dulsat	P Lluch	P Cornellà	P Olmedo	P Tarradas	—	

== Opinion polls ==
The tables below list opinion polling results in reverse chronological order, showing the most recent first and using the dates when the survey fieldwork was done, as opposed to the date of publication. Where the fieldwork dates are unknown, the date of publication is given instead. The highest percentage figure in each polling survey is displayed with its background shaded in the leading party's colour. If a tie ensues, this is applied to the figures with the highest percentages. The "Lead" column on the right shows the percentage-point difference between the parties with the highest percentages in a poll.

=== Graphical summary ===
Local regression trend line of poll results from 21 December 2017 to 14 February 2021, with each line corresponding to a political party.

=== Voting intention estimates ===
The table below lists weighted voting intention estimates. Refusals are generally excluded from the party vote percentages, while question wording and the treatment of "don't know" responses and those not intending to vote may vary between polling organisations. When available, seat projections determined by the polling organisations are displayed below (or in place of) the percentages in a smaller font; 68 seats were required for an absolute majority in the Parliament of Catalonia.

Color key:

Poll conducted after legal ban on opinion polls

Polling firm/Commissioner	Fieldwork date	Sample size	Turnout	Cs	JuntsxCat	ERC	PSC	CatComú–Podem ECP	CUP	PP	Vox	PP+Cs	JxCat	PDeCAT	Lead
2021 regional election	14 Feb 2021	—N/a	51.3	5.6; 6	–	21.3; 33	23.0; 33	6.9; 8	6.7; 9	3.8; 3	7.7; 11	–	20.1; 32	2.7; 0	1.7
NC Report/La Razón (Note: ""Efecto Puigdemont"". La Razón (in Spanish). 14 February 2021.)	14 Feb 2021	?	?	11.1; 14	–	19.4; 30	20.7; 29	7.3; 8	5.8; 8	6.7; 8	6.2; 5/6	–	21.5; 36/37	1.6; 0	0.8
GAD3/RTVE–CCMA	14 Feb 2021	8,500	50	5.3; 6/7	–	24.3; 36/38	24.5; 34/36	6.0; 6/7	5.4; 7	4.6; 4/5	5.9; 6/7	–	20.5; 30/33	2.5; 0/2	0.2
SocioMétrica/El Español	13–14 Feb 2021	?	?	8.0; 9/11	–	18.5; 27/29	20.2; 29/31	7.2; 8/10	6.5; 7/9	3.5; 3/5	7.3; 8/10	–	23.1; 34/36	2.6; 0/2	2.9
Feedback/El Nacional	8–14 Feb 2021	1,600	62.2	7.8; 10/11	–	18.5; 28/29	21.4; 29/32	8.0; 9/11	6.7; 8/9	4.0; 3/5	6.9; 8/9	–	20.7; 31/33	2.8; 0/2	0.7
GESOP/El Periódico	4–14 Feb 2021	3,867	59	6.0; 6/7	–	20.4; 31/33	22.7; 31/33	7.3; 8/9	5.5; 7/8	5.5; 6/7	7.5; 10/11	–	20.0; 31/33	2.9; 0/2	2.3
SyM Consulting	2–14 Feb 2021	4,752	65.1	12.0; 15	–	20.6; 31/32	17.8; 24	7.0; 7/8	5.3; 4/6	3.8; 3/4	9.4; 13	–	22.1; 33/36	–	1.5
Feedback/The National	7–13 Feb 2021	1,000	61.3	8.9; 12/13	–	18.6; 28/29	19.9; 28/29	7.8; 9/11	6.0; 8	4.1; 3/5	6.9; 9/10	–	20.6; 32/35	2.8; 0/2	0.7
ElectoPanel/Electomanía	12 Feb 2021	400	?	8.5; 12	–	20.0; 30	21.4; 30	7.1; 8	5.9; 8	4.8; 5	6.7; 8	–	20.8; 34	1.4; 0	0.6
ElectoPanel/Electomanía	11–12 Feb 2021	400	?	8.7; 12	–	19.7; 30	21.2; 30	7.1; 8	5.7; 8	4.8; 5	6.8; 8	–	21.1; 34	1.4; 0	0.1
GESOP/El Periòdic	10–12 Feb 2021	854	58–60	7.5; 8/9	–	20.3; 31/33	22.9; 31/33	6.9; 8/9	6.9; 8/9	5.5; 6/7	6.3; 7/8	–	18.8; 28/30	3.0; 0/2	2.6
Feedback/The National	6–12 Feb 2021	1,000	60.8	9.3; 12/13	–	18.8; 28/29	20.0; 28/29	8.5; 11	5.6; 7/8	4.7; 5	5.4; 5/6	–	20.7; 33/34	2.8; 0/2	0.7
Metroscopia	1–12 Feb 2021	4,266	57	9.0; 12	–	20.3; 29	23.2; 32	6.4; 7	5.9; 8	5.3; 6	5.4; 6	–	21.1; 34	2.2; 1	2.1
ElectoPanel/Electomanía	10–11 Feb 2021	400	?	8.7; 12	–	20.3; 31	20.7; 29	7.0; 8	5.7; 8	5.0; 5	7.0; 8	–	21.0; 34	1.4; 0	0.3
GESOP/El Periòdic	9–11 Feb 2021	806	57–59	7.0; 8/9	–	20.8; 31/33	23.1; 32/34	7.0; 8/9	6.1; 8/9	4.4; 4/5	7.0; 8/9	–	18.8; 28/30	3.4; 0/3	2.3
Feedback/The National	5–11 Feb 2021	1,000	58.4	9.6; 13	–	18.9; 29	19.7; 28/30	7.9; 10/11	6.3; 8/9	4.7; 5	5.7; 6/8	–	20.6; 33/34	2.5; 0	0.9
ElectoPanel/Electomanía	9–10 Feb 2021	400	?	8.7; 12	–	20.0; 30	21.6; 30	6.9; 8	5.6; 8	4.9; 5	6.9; 8	–	20.8; 34	1.3; 0	0.8
GESOP/El Periòdic	8–10 Feb 2021	757	56–58	6.7; 7/8	–	20.8; 31/33	23.0; 32/34	6.9; 8/9	6.4; 8/9	4.4; 4/5	7.5; 9/10	–	18.8; 29/31	3.0; 0/2	2.2
Feedback/The National	4–10 Feb 2021	1,000	57.7	10.3; 13/14	–	17.8; 27/28	20.3; 29/30	8.6; 10/12	7.1; 9	4.1; 3/5	5.1; 5/6	–	20.3; 32/35	2.2; 0	Tie
ElectoPanel/Electomanía	8–9 Feb 2021	400	?	8.7; 12	–	20.0; 30	21.7; 31	6.8; 8	5.4; 7	4.9; 5	6.9; 8	–	20.8; 34	1.4; 0	0.9
GESOP/El Periòdic	7–9 Feb 2021	754	56–58	6.3; 7/8	–	20.2; 31/33	22.9; 32/34	6.8; 7/8	6.5; 8/9	4.4; 4/5	7.9; 9/10	–	19.8; 30/32	2.2; 0	2.7
Feedback/The National	3–9 Feb 2021	1,000	58.6	9.8; 13/14	–	19.7; 29/32	19.2; 28/29	7.2; 8/9	7.5; 9/11	4.0; 3/5	5.5; 6/7	–	19.8; 31/34	? 0	0.1
Celeste-Tel	8 Feb 2021	?	60.0	10.2; 14	–	19.7; 30	21.8; 31	7.5; 8	5.3; 7	5.6; 7	6.0; 7	–	20.0; 31	1.5; 0	1.8
ElectoPanel/Electomanía	7–8 Feb 2021	400	?	8.8; 12	–	20.2; 31	21.9; 31	6.7; 7	5.2; 7	4.9; 5	6.9; 8	–	20.7; 34	1.4; 0	1.2
GESOP/El Periòdic	6–8 Feb 2021	752	56–58	6.5; 7/8	–	20.6; 31/33	22.6; 31/33	7.0; 8/9	6.7; 8/9	4.4; 4/5	7.1; 8/9	–	20.6; 31/33	1.1; 0	2.0
Feedback/The National	2–8 Feb 2021	1,000	59.1	9.8; 13	–	19.8; 30/32	19.3; 28/30	7.2; 8/9	7.8; 10/11	3.6; 3	5.2; 5/6	–	20.4; 32/35	1.8; 0	0.6
Feedback/El Nacional	1–8 Feb 2021	1,000	?	8.7; 12	–	20.1; 32	21.3; 31/32	7.1; 9	7.6; 10/11	3.5; 3	5.7; 6	–	19.7; 31/32	1.4; 0	1.2
SocioMétrica/El Español	18 Jan–8 Feb 2021	4,400	54	7.7; 10/12	–	19.1; 29/31	21.0; 29/31	7.4; 8/10	6.6; 7/9	5.0; 4/6	7.7; 9/11	–	20.4; 30/32	–	0.6
KeyData/Público	7 Feb 2021	?	62.0	9.9; 12	–	21.0; 32	20.9; 30	6.8; 8	5.7; 7	5.6; 7	5.5; 7	–	19.8; 32	2.6; 0/2	0.1
GESOP	5–7 Feb 2021	?	?	7.2; 8/9	–	20.1; 31/33	22.6; 31/33	7.2; 8/9	6.8; 8/9	4.3; 4/5	7.3; 9/10	–	19.4; 30/32	1.8; 0	2.5
Demoscopia y Servicios	5–7 Feb 2021	1,000	56	8.2; 11	–	20.7; 31	22.1; 31	7.1; 9	5.7; 8	5.4; 6	5.8; 7	–	21.4; 32	–	0.7
Sigma Dos/El Mundo	6 Feb 2021	?	?	9.2; 11/12	–	20.8; 31/34	22.9; 30/33	7.0; 7/9	5.7; 7/8	5.6; 5/7	5.4; 5/7	–	21.4; 32/34	–	1.5
GESOP/El Periódico	4–6 Feb 2021	751	56–58	7.6; 9/10	–	20.8; 32/34	23.0; 32/34	7.7; 8/9	6.3; 8/9	3.8; 3/4	6.9; 8/9	–	18.8; 29/31	1.8; 0	2.2
NC Report/La Razón	3–6 Feb 2021	1,000	58.2	10.9; 14	–	20.3; 31	21.5; 31	7.2; 8	5.5; 7	6.3; 7	5.8; 6	–	19.9; 31	1.4; 0	1.2
ElectoPanel/Electomanía	5 Feb 2021	400	?	9.7; 13	–	20.9; 33	21.7; 31	6.6; 7	5.0; 5	5.8; 7	5.4; 6	–	20.0; 33	1.3; 0	0.8
Feedback/El Nacional	1–5 Feb 2021	800	61.2	7.4; 9/10	–	19.4; 29/32	23.1; 33/34	7.3; 8/10	7.7; 9/11	3.9; 3/4	6.1; 6/9	–	20.0; 31/34	? 0	3.1
Hamalgama Métrica/Okdiario	1–4 Feb 2021	1,000	?	11.8; 14	–	20.0; 32	20.2; 30	7.2; 8	5.4; 7	5.8; 6	5.5; 6	–	20.3; 32	–	0.1
Opinòmetre/Ara	1–4 Feb 2021	830	?	8.3; 11/12	–	21.8; 31/32	20.7; 29/32	6.9; 8/9	6.6; 8/9	5.0; 6/7	5.2; 6/7	–	19.7; 29/30	2.5; 0/3	1.1
CIS	1–3 Feb 2021	1,838	?	7.9	–	19.9	23.7	8.9	6.8	5.8	6.9	–	14.6	1.5	3.8
Infortécnica/Segre	3 Jan–3 Feb 2021	908	?	? 12/14	–	? 28/30	? 28/30	? 6/8	? 7/9	? 8/10	? 8/10	–	? 29/31	–	?
DYM/Henneo	29 Jan–2 Feb 2021	1,259	?	10.6; 11/13	–	19.2; 29/31	22.7; 29/32	7.2; 7/8	6.0; 7/9	3.5; 3/4	5.8; 6/8	–	22.1; 35/38	–	0.6
Sigma Dos/Antena 3	31 Jan 2021	?	?	10.3; 12/14	–	21.2; 31/33	22.5; 29/32	7.3; 7/8	5.3; 5/7	5.6; 6/7	5.1; 6/7	–	20.7; 30/32	–	1.3
SocioMétrica/El Español	18–31 Jan 2021	2,800	49	11.0; 13/15	–	19.4; 28/30	20.3; 28/30	7.3; 8/10	5.6; 7/9	5.5; 6/7	6.0; 6/7	–	20.4; 31/33	–	0.1
NC Report/La Razón	25–30 Jan 2021	1,000	68.7	10.8; 13	–	21.2; 32	19.6; 29	6.9; 8	5.8; 7	6.7; 8	5.6; 6	–	19.6; 32	–	1.6
ElectoPanel/Electomanía	29 Jan 2021	400	?	10.5; 14	–	21.5; 34	21.6; 30	6.7; 7	4.8; 5	6.0; 7	5.2; 5	–	19.6; 33	1.2; 0	0.1
GESOP/El Periódico	25–28 Jan 2021	1,445	60–63	9.0; 11/12	–	19.8; 31/32	24.0; 34/35	6.3; 6/7	5.3; 6/7	6.3; 8/9	5.2; 5/6	–	19.1; 30/31	1.1; 0	4.2
ElectoPanel/Electomanía	22 Jan 2021	400	?	10.4; 14	–	22.0; 34	21.4; 30	6.7; 7	4.7; 5	6.1; 7	5.3; 6	–	19.8; 32	1.4; 0	0.6
SocioMétrica/El Español	18–22 Jan 2021	2,690	52	11.2; 15/17	–	19.3; 29/31	21.5; 30/31	7.2; 7/8	4.9; 5/6	5.8; 6/7	5.8; 6/7	–	19.7; 31/33	–	1.8
NC Report/La Razón	18–22 Jan 2021	1,000	70.1	11.1; 14	–	20.5; 33	18.7; 25	7.3; 8	6.1; 8	6.7; 8	6.0; 7	–	19.2; 32	1.6; 0	1.3
Opinòmetre/CEO	13–21 Jan 2021	1,100	62	9.6; 12/13	–	22.0; 34/35	19.6; 26/29	6.5; 6/8	6.2; 8	7.0; 9	4.8; 5/6	–	20.7; 32/34	2.3; 0	1.3
ElectoPanel/Electomanía	15 Jan 2021	400	?	10.4; 14	–	21.9; 34	21.0; 29	6.6; 7	4.5; 5	6.1; 7	5.4; 6	–	20.4; 33	1.4; 0	0.9
CIS (Redlines) (Note: Alternative projection based on raw CIS data.)	2–15 Jan 2021	4,106	?	11.4	–	19.4	20.8	6.7	6.0	6.6	5.5	–	18.5	–	1.4
CIS	2–15 Jan 2021	4,106	?	9.6; 13/15	–	20.6; 31/33	23.9; 30/35	9.7; 9/12	6.0; 8/11	5.8; 7	6.6; 6/10	–	12.5; 20/27	0.7; 0	3.3
ElectoPanel/Electomanía	8 Jan 2021	400	?	10.0; 13	–	21.5; 33	20.0; 28	7.3; 9	5.0; 5	6.0; 7	5.5; 6	–	21.3; 34	1.3; 0	0.2
GAD3/La Vanguardia	4–8 Jan 2021	800	64	9.7; 13	–	24.1; 37/39	20.5; 29/30	6.0; 6/7	4.3; 4/5	6.2; 8	4.1; 4	–	18.5; 31	2.9; 0/1	3.6
GESOP/El Periódico	4–7 Jan 2021	801	?	9.8; 12/13	–	20.9; 32/33	24.1; 34/35	5.9; 6/7	5.4; 7/8	5.9; 6/7	5.0; 5/6	–	19.0; 29/30	1.0; 0	3.2
SocioMétrica/El Español	2–5 Jan 2021	900	61	12.0; 16/17	–	20.1; 31/32	19.3; 27/28	7.0; 7/8	5.2; 6/7	6.1; 7	6.3; 7	–	19.9; 30/31	–	0.2
SocioMétrica/El Español	23–29 Dec 2020	1,200	66	13.2; 19/20	–	21.7; 33/34	16.7; 22/23	7.7; 8/9	4.9; 5/6	6.3; 6/7	6.1; 6/7	–	20.3; 32/33	1.6; 0/1	1.4
ElectoPanel/Electomanía	20 Dec 2020	400	?	10.4; 14	–	22.8; 35	18.2; 25	7.4; 9	5.2; 7	6.4; 8	4.9; 5	–	19.7; 32	1.8; 0	3.1
GESOP/CEO	25 Nov–7 Dec 2020	1,500	68	11.6; 14/16	–	23.0; 35	18.5; 25	6.9; 7/9	6.4; 8/9	6.0; 7/9	4.6; 4/6	–	19.6; 30/32	1.9; 0/1	3.4
GESOP/El Periódico	30 Nov–1 Dec 2020	801	?	10.6; 13/14	–	22.0; 35/36	18.9; 27/28	7.5; 8/9	5.0; 6/7	5.9; 7/8	4.5; 4/5	–	19.4; 30/31	2.4; 0	2.6
ElectoPanel/Electomanía	30 Nov 2020	815	?	9.8; 13	–	23.2; 36	18.2; 25	7.7; 9	5.2; 5	6.8; 8	5.3; 6	–	20.2; 33	1.7; 0	3.0
GESOP/CEO	13 Oct–7 Nov 2020	2,000	65	10.0; 13/14	–	24.4; 36/37	16.8; 22/23	7.2; 7/9	5.3; 6/8	7.0; 8/9	6.4; 7/8	–	18.7; 28/30	2.4; 0/1	5.7
GESOP	19–23 Oct 2020	1,463	?	12.5; 16/17	18.3; 28/29	22.9; 35/36	17.5; 24/25	7.3; 9/10	5.8; 8	6.2; 7/8	5.1; 5	–	–	–	4.6
KeyData/Público	17 Oct 2020	?	71.9	12.3; 15	19.7; 31	24.1; 37	17.0; 25	7.6; 9	4.8; 7	6.4; 7	4.2; 4	–	–	–	4.4
GESOP/CEO	29 Sep–9 Oct 2020	1,500	65	12.0; 16/17	19.4; 31/32	23.4; 35/36	18.0; 24/25	7.6; 8/9	4.9; 6/7	6.0; 7/8	4.5; 4/6	–	–	–	4.0
NC Report/La Razón	28 Sep–2 Oct 2020	1,000	72.7	11.9; 16	20.0; 31	23.2; 35	17.8; 25	7.8; 9	4.5; 6	7.6; 10	5.0; 3	–	–	–	3.2
GAD3/La Vanguardia	1–4 Sep 2020	805	69	10.2; 13	19.9; 31	27.2; 42	19.1; 26	6.7; 7	3.9; 4	6.4; 8	4.2; 4	–	–	–	7.3
ElectoPanel/Electomanía	31 Aug 2020	8,000	?	10.1; 14	21.4; 34	22.4; 35	17.9; 24	8.1; 10	5.5; 5	7.1; 8	4.6; 5	–	–	–	1.0
GESOP/CEO	25 Jun–21 Jul 2020	2,000	70	14.4; 19	20.9; 32/33	22.1; 33/34	17.0; 24	8.2; 9/10	4.9; 6/7	5.5; 6/7	4.0; 3/4	–	–	–	1.2
GESOP/El Periódico	6–13 Jul 2020	1,479	?	11.9; 15/16	19.3; 29/30	22.5; 34/35	17.9; 25/26	7.9; 9/10	5.4; 7/8	6.1; 7/8	5.4; 5/6	–	–	–	3.2
Feedback/El Nacional	29 Jun–2 Jul 2020	800	?	9.5; 12/13	17.8; 28	27.4; 41/42	19.7; 26/28	6.6; 7	6.2; 8	5.7; 6	5.1; 5	–	–	–	7.7
ElectoPanel/Electomanía	1 Apr–15 May 2020	?	?	9.6; 13	21.2; 32	21.1; 32	19.5; 26	8.7; 10	6.5; 8	8.7; 11	3.5; 3	–	–	–	0.1
GESOP/El Periódico	29 Apr–8 May 2020	1,455	?	12.9; 17/18	16.8; 25/26	25.2; 40/41	18.0; 25/26	7.7; 8/9	6.1; 8	6.3; 7/8	3.8; 4	–	–	–	7.2
GESOP/CEO	10 Feb–9 Mar 2020	2,000	70	12.8; 16/18	18.6; 28/30	23.0; 33/35	17.4; 23/24	10.9; 13/14	7.1; 8/9	5.5; 7/8	3.0; 0/2	–	–	–	4.4
GAD3/ABC	21–26 Feb 2020	800	?	8.9; 12	15.4; 24	28.1; 43	20.8; 27	8.1; 10	4.9; 6	7.2; 9	4.4; 4	–	–	–	7.3
KeyData/Público	6 Feb 2020	?	80.9	12.0; 17	19.1; 30	23.7; 35	18.0; 24	9.1; 11	7.0; 9	4.6; 5	4.0; 4	–	–	–	4.6
GAD3/La Vanguardia	3–6 Feb 2020	800	70.7	(Note: Within PP+Cs.)	20.0; 31	25.2; 38	21.1; 27	8.9; 10	5.2; 7		3.7; 3	14.5; 19	–	–	4.1
GAD3/La Vanguardia	3–6 Feb 2020	800	70.7	8.5; 12	19.8; 31	24.9; 37	20.3; 27	8.8; 10	5.1; 6	6.7; 8	4.4; 4	–	–	–	4.6
ERC	2 Feb 2020	?	?	–	? 25	? 37	? 28	–	? 10	–	–	–	–	–	?
SocioMétrica/El Español	2 Feb 2020	?	?		18.6; 29	23.0; 35	19.4; 25	10.0; 12	6.2; 8		4.8; 5	17.0; 21/23	–	–	3.6
SocioMétrica/El Español	2 Feb 2020	?	?	10.9; 14	18.6; 29	23.0; 35	19.4; 25	10.0; 12	6.2; 8	6.1; 7	4.8; 5	–	–	–	3.6
NC Report/La Razón	27–31 Jan 2020	1,000	73.8	10.3; 14	19.5; 31	21.0; 32	17.4; 24	8.3; 10	5.9; 8	8.9; 12	6.3; 4	–	–	–	1.5
GESOP/El Periódico	27–31 Jan 2020	1,435	?	12.8; 16/17	19.0; 29/30	22.0; 33/34	16.9; 22/23	9.4; 11/12	6.6; 8/9	4.8; 5/6	5.5; 6/7	–	–	–	3.0
ElectoPanel/Electomanía	27–29 Jan 2020	1,500	?		20.0; 30	20.7; 31	20.1; 26	8.8; 10	7.8; 10		5.0; 5	16.7; 23	–	–	0.6
ElectoPanel/Electomanía	27–29 Jan 2020	1,500	?	7.4; 9	20.0; 31	20.7; 31	19.4; 27	8.8; 10	7.8; 10	8.4; 11	6.2; 6	–	–	–	0.7
CatComú	Dec 2019	1,002	?	12.1	15.6	25.3	20.9	10.8	5.3	4.3	5.0	–	–	–	4.4
GESOP/CEO	14 Nov–5 Dec 2019	1,500	70	12.0; 14/16	19.0; 29/31	25.4; 38/39	18.0; 24/25	10.2; 11/13	7.3; 9/10	4.3; 4/5	2.0; 0/2	–	–	–	6.4
ElectoPanel/Electomanía	27–30 Nov 2019	2,000	?	7.2; 9	15.8; 24	22.0; 34	18.4; 25	8.1; 10	10.0; 13	7.9; 10	7.5; 10	–	–	–	3.6
NC Report/La Razón	18–22 Nov 2019	1,000	74.4	11.6; 17	19.2; 31	21.2; 32	16.8; 24	7.7; 9	5.6; 7	8.8; 12	6.4; 3	–	–	–	2.0
November 2019 general election	10 Nov 2019	—N/a	69.4	5.6 (6)	13.7 (22)	22.6 (35)	20.5 (29)	14.2 (18)	6.4 (7)	7.4 (10)	6.3 (8)	–	–	–	1.9
ElectoPanel/Electomanía	16–19 Oct 2019	2,000	?	15.1; 21	12.3; 19	24.5; 38	17.6; 24	8.2; 10	10.5; 13	6.0; 7	3.3; 3	–	–	–	6.9
ElectoPanel/Electomanía	14–15 Oct 2019	1,000	?	13.1; 18	15.1; 24	24.3; 37	20.2; 26	8.0; 10	7.9; 11	5.0; 5	4.0; 4	–	–	–	4.1
NC Report/La Razón	1–5 Oct 2019	1,000	71.1	19.0; 27	15.1; 23	24.0; 39	19.9; 28	5.9; 7	5.4; 5	5.5; 6	1.9; 0	–	–	–	4.1
ElectoPanel/Electomanía	11 Sep 2019	?	?	15.2; 21	15.8; 24	25.3; 40	20.1; 29	7.6; 8	5.4; 5	6.3; 8	1.8; 0	–	–	–	5.2
NC Report/La Razón	3–7 Sep 2019	1,000	71.3	21.1; 29	14.0; 21	25.6; 41	19.1; 27	6.2; 7	4.9; 5	4.8; 5	2.2; 0	–	–	–	4.5
ElectoPanel/Electomanía	20 Aug 2019	?	?	14.5; 20	15.5; 24	26.4; 40	20.3; 29	7.1; 8	6.0; 7	6.0; 7	2.0; 0	–	–	–	6.1
ElectoPanel/Electomanía	17 Jul 2019	?	?	14.1; 19	15.3; 24	26.7; 41	20.1; 29	7.1; 8	6.1; 7	6.2; 7	2.1; 0	–	–	–	6.6
GESOP/CEO	25 Jun–17 Jul 2019	1,500	70	17.0; 23/24	16.6; 25/27	26.5; 38/40	18.7; 25	9.5; 11/12	5.2; 6/7	3.5; 3	–	–	–	–	7.8
GESOP/El Periódico	1–5 Jul 2019	1,422	?	16.5; 22/23	16.5; 24/25	26.5; 40/41	20.0; 28/29	7.0; 8/9	5.5; 7/8	4.0; 3/4	–	–	–	–	6.5
2019 EP election	26 May 2019	—N/a	60.9	8.6 (12)	28.6 (44)	21.2 (33)	22.1 (31)	8.4 (9)	–	5.2 (6)	2.0 (0)	–	–	–	6.5
April 2019 general election	28 Apr 2019	—N/a	74.6	11.6 (13)	12.1 (22)	24.6; 39)	23.2 (32)	14.9 (20)	2.7 (Note: Results for FR in the April 2019 general election.) (0)	4.8 (5)	3.6 (4)	–	–	–	1.4
Opinòmetre/CEO	4–25 Mar 2019	1,500	70	21.6; 28/29	14.9; 22/24	28.1; 40/43	16.5; 21/23	7.0; 8/9	6.5; 8	4.0; 3/4	–	–	–	–	3.7
GESOP/El Periódico	10 Feb 2019	1,468	?	21.5; 30/31	15.0; 23/24	25.5; 39/40	15.5; 21/22	7.5; 9/10	6.5; 8/9	4.0; 2	2.5; 0	–	–	–	4.0
NC Report/La Razón	24 Dec 2018	?	74.5	25.0; 37	14.9; 23	24.1; 38	15.0; 19	7.7; 8	5.0; 5	4.4; 5	2.0; 0	–	–	–	0.9
Opinòmetre/Ara	3–12 Dec 2018	800	?	23.4; 33/35	16.2; 25/26	25.7; 38/40	13.9; 17/18	7.1; 7/8	8.3; 10/11	2.5; 0	1.1; 0	–	–	–	2.3
Opinòmetre/CEO	22 Oct–12 Nov 2018	1,500	68	21.4; 29/30	14.8; 23/24	25.1; 36/38	14.5; 17/18	10.4; 12/13	8.5; 10/11	3.3; 2/3	–	–	–	–	3.7
GESOP/El Periódico	22–25 Oct 2018	739	?	22.5; 30/31	14.5; 22/23	25.3; 37/39	17.3; 23/24	7.5; 8/9	7.4; 9/10	3.5; 3	–	–	–	–	2.8
NC Report/La Razón	24–28 Sep 2018	1,000	?	23.7; 35	16.2; 25	23.9; 37	15.8; 20	6.5; 8	3.9; 4	5.3; 6	–	–	–	–	0.2
ElectoPanel/Electomanía	16–18 Sep 2018	?	?	21.9; 30	14.9; 22	27.7; 42	16.1; 22	7.0; 8	7.0; 9	3.2; 2	–	–	–	–	5.8
SocioMétrica/El Español	22–30 Aug 2018	500	?	22.3; 31/33	18.4; 25/27	25.1; 35/37	14.9; 20/22	7.3; 8/9	5.5; 6/7	5.1; 5/6	–	–	–	–	2.8
Opinòmetre/CEO	23 Jun–14 Jul 2018	1,500	70	21.4; 29/30	17.9; 27/29	24.0; 35/37	15.5; 19/21	7.8; 8/10	7.0; 8/10	3.8; 3/4	–	–	–	–	2.6
GESOP/El Periódico	2–11 Jul 2018	1,445	?	21.5; 29/30	16.5; 26/27	23.5; 35/36	15.5; 21/22	8.5; 9/10	6.5; 8/9	4.5; 4/5	–	–	–	–	2.0
GAD3/La Vanguardia	14–21 Jun 2018	800	75	24.0; 34	20.1; 30	24.3; 35	14.6; 19	7.0; 8	4.5; 5	4.1; 4	–	–	–	–	0.3
ElectoPanel/Electomanía	3–7 Jun 2018	?	?	21.3; 29	20.4; 29	20.7; 29	16.3; 23	7.6; 10	7.6; 10	4.9; 5	–	–	–	–	0.8
Opinòmetre/CEO	7–27 Apr 2018	1,500	68	24.5; 33/34	19.8; 30/32	20.5; 29/32	11.0; 13/15	9.5; 11	9.0; 11	4.1; 3/4	–	–	–	–	4.0
NC Report/La Razón	17–20 Apr 2018	1,000	76.9	26.0; 38	18.7; 31	21.8; 32	15.2; 18	5.4; 7	3.8; 4	4.5; 5	–	–	–	–	4.2
NC Report/La Razón	22–28 Mar 2018	1,000	76.8	25.7; 38	19.4; 32	21.0; 31	14.9; 18	6.0; 7	4.2; 4	4.8; 5	–	–	–	–	4.7
Apolda/CEO	10–30 Jan 2018	1,200	68	24.7; 33/35	19.5; 29/31	22.9; 33/35	12.5; 15/16	7.4; 8	6.0; 7/8	4.6; 3/4	–	–	–	–	1.8
NC Report/La Razón	15–19 Jan 2018	1,000	75.2	24.9; 37	22.4; 34	20.6; 31	14.3; 17	6.9; 7	3.5; 4	5.9; 5	–	–	–	–	2.5
2017 regional election	21 Dec 2017	—N/a	79.1	25.4; 36	21.7; 34	21.4; 32	13.9; 17	7.5; 8	4.5; 4	4.2; 4	–	–	–	–	3.7

=== Voting preferences ===
The table below lists raw, unweighted voting preferences.

Color key:

Poll conducted after legal ban on opinion polls

Polling firm/Commissioner	Fieldwork date	Sample size	Cs	JuntsxCat	ERC	PSC	ECP	CUP	PP	Vox	JxCat	PDeCAT	Question	X mark	Lead
2021 regional election (Note: Does not include non-resident citizens.)	14 Feb 2021	—N/a	2.9	–	11.2	12.2	3.6	3.5	2.0	4.1	10.6	1.4	—N/a	46.5	1.0
GESOP/El Periòdic	10–12 Feb 2021	854	2.5	–	16.0	16.0	6.0	6.5	1.5	2.1	8.8	1.4	38.8		Tie
GESOP/El Periòdic	9–11 Feb 2021	806	3.1	–	14.8	17.3	5.5	5.3	1.4	2.4	9.4	1.5	39.2		2.5
GESOP/El Periòdic	8–10 Feb 2021	757	2.4	–	15.1	16.0	5.8	4.7	0.9	2.3	10.1	1.4	41.0		0.9
GESOP/El Periòdic	7–9 Feb 2021	754	2.0	–	14.0	16.4	4.6	4.0	1.1	2.5	12.2	1.0	41.7		2.4
GESOP/El Periòdic	6–8 Feb 2021	752	1.7	–	13.0	15.3	5.1	5.0	1.1	2.0	11.9	0.5	43.8		2.3
GESOP/El Periódico	4–6 Feb 2021	751	2.2	–	13.8	15.5	5.5	5.2	0.8	2.1	9.6	0.5	29.3	11.6	1.7
CIS	1–3 Feb 2021	1,838	2.3	–	10.7	13.9	3.9	3.5	2.2	2.7	7.3	0.7	37.7	12.2	3.2
DYM/Henneo	29 Jan–2 Feb 2021	1,259	4.3	–	14.9	14.1	6.1	5.6	1.2	4.2	11.9	0.6	19.4	13.9	0.8
GESOP/El Periódico	25–28 Jan 2021	1,445	1.9	–	14.2	15.3	4.5	4.3	1.9	1.4	9.4	0.5	31.6	9.3	1.1
Opinòmetre/CEO	13–21 Jan 2021	1,100	1.6	–	15.0	10.5	4.5	3.8	1.3	0.9	8.5	1.0	43.5	6.5	4.5
CIS	2–15 Jan 2021	4,106	3.1	–	9.8	11.7	3.2	3.2	1.8	1.6	6.5	0.3	50.7	5.0	1.9
GAD3/La Vanguardia	4–8 Jan 2021	800	7.2	–	18.7	17.4	3.7	3.0	4.1	2.7	12.4	1.3	27.0		1.3
GESOP/El Periódico	4–7 Jan 2021	801	2.8	–	16.6	19.2	4.0	4.2	2.2	2.0	10.7	0.5	23.8	6.9	2.6
SocioMétrica/El Español	2–5 Jan 2021	900	7.5	–	10.2	14.5	4.3	2.5	3.5	5.8	13.3	1.2	35.8		1.2
GESOP/CEO	25 Nov–7 Dec 2020	1,500	2.8	–	16.3	9.1	5.1	3.7	0.9	0.6	6.0	0.6	45.5	6.3	7.2
GESOP/El Periódico	30 Nov–1 Dec 2020	801	3.9	–	19.3	14.6	6.3	4.3	2.7	1.9	12.3	1.4	21.0	6.1	4.7
GESOP/CEO	13 Oct–7 Nov 2020	2,000	2.3	–	20.9	10.9	5.5	4.7	2.1	1.7	8.1	1.1	27.3	9.5	10.0
GESOP	19–23 Oct 2020	1,463	2.0	8.1	17.1	8.5	5.0	4.8	1.5	1.5	–	–	34.5	11.0	8.6
GESOP/ICPS	14 Sep–14 Oct 2020	1,200	4.7	–	22.9	11.5	6.9	5.5	1.9	1.5	10.0	1.1	19.2	10.3	11.4
GESOP/CEO	29 Sep–9 Oct 2020	1,500	3.5	10.7	18.2	10.4	7.6	4.9	6.0	4.5	–	–	30.1	5.9	7.5
GAD3/La Vanguardia	1–4 Sep 2020	805	6.9	11.8	23.1	13.9	4.5	2.1	4.5	2.4	–	–	29.1		9.2
GESOP/CEO	25 Jun–21 Jul 2020	2,000	3.3	10.1	19.4	12.1	7.9	4.0	1.8	1.1	–	–	25.4	9.0	7.3
GESOP/El Periódico	6–13 Jul 2020	1,479	2.2	7.8	17.4	11.1	6.8	4.5	1.1	1.7	–	–	33.3	8.9	6.3
GESOP/El Periódico	29 Apr–8 May 2020	1,455	2.5	6.1	17.5	8.6	6.1	3.5	1.8	0.9	–	–	37.7	9.6	8.9
GESOP/CEO	10 Feb–9 Mar 2020	2,000	3.4	10.2	22.1	13.4	9.3	6.0	2.1	1.9	–	–	18.8	7.1	8.7
GAD3/La Vanguardia	3–6 Feb 2020	800	4.8	14.0	24.1	17.5	7.3	3.8	4.6	2.5	–	–	–	–	6.6
GESOP/CEO	14 Nov–5 Dec 2019	1,500	3.1	9.6	24.3	12.5	8.4	5.9	1.3	1.1	–	–	22.1	7.3	11.8
November 2019 general election	10 Nov 2019	—N/a	4.0	9.8	16.2	14.7	10.2	4.6	5.3	4.5	–	–	—N/a	27.9	1.5
GESOP/ICPS	25 Sep–23 Oct 2019	1,200	6.4	10.7	24.3	15.0	8.3	7.2	1.7	0.8	–	–	13.2	8.8	9.3
GESOP/CEO	25 Jun–17 Jul 2019	1,500	4.4	8.5	26.2	15.5	9.2	4.5	1.3	–	–	–	18.4	6.3	10.7
GESOP/El Periódico	1–5 Jul 2019	1,422	4.7	7.7	24.7	13.1	6.1	4.0	1.3	–	–	–	36.4		11.6
2019 EP election	26 May 2019	—N/a	5.4	18.1	13.4	13.9	5.3	–	3.3	1.3	–	–	—N/a	36.6	4.2
April 2019 general election	28 Apr 2019	—N/a	8.9	9.3	19.0	17.9	11.5	2.1	3.7	2.8	–	–	—N/a	22.4	1.1
Opinòmetre/CEO	4–25 Mar 2019	1,500	6.1	7.3	26.9	11.5	6.3	6.3	1.2	–	–	–	21.6	7.1	15.4
GESOP/El Periódico	10 Feb 2019	1,468	7.3	9.2	25.2	9.3	5.9	7.1	1.2	0.8	–	–	33.3		15.9
Opinòmetre/CEO	22 Oct–12 Nov 2018	1,500	8.4	10.0	22.3	9.2	9.2	8.2	1.5	–	–	–	16.3	8.1	12.3
GESOP/ICPS	8 Oct–5 Nov 2018	1,200	8.8	9.6	23.4	11.7	9.8	8.4	2.2	–	–	–	13.9	8.2	11.7
GESOP/El Periódico	22–25 Oct 2018	739	11.0	9.0	24.0	12.6	7.1	8.7	2.1	–	–	–	24.5		11.4
Opinòmetre/CEO	23 Jun–14 Jul 2018	1,500	9.9	12.5	22.8	12.1	6.9	6.2	2.0	–	–	–	16.6	6.4	10.3
GESOP/El Periódico	2–11 Jul 2018	1,445	6.3	7.9	17.9	6.9	5.9	5.6	1.9	–	–	–	46.4		10.0
GAD3/La Vanguardia	14–21 Jun 2018	800	15.6	15.2	20.8	10.5	6.5	3.5	2.0	–	–	–	–	–	5.2
Opinòmetre/CEO	7–27 Apr 2018	1,500	10.7	15.6	19.8	7.2	8.8	8.8	2.5	–	–	–	15.5	5.1	4.2
Apolda/CEO	10–30 Jan 2018	1,200	17.2	12.5	20.0	10.9	6.4	5.4	1.9	–	–	–	15.7	6.1	2.8
2017 regional election	21 Dec 2017	—N/a	20.7	17.7	17.4	11.3	6.1	3.6	3.5	–	–	–	—N/a	18.2	3.0

=== Victory preferences ===
The table below lists opinion polling on the victory preferences for each party in the event of a regional election taking place.

Polling firm/Commissioner	Fieldwork date	Sample size	Cs	ERC	PSC	ECP	CUP	PP	Vox	JxCat	PDeCAT	Other/ None	Question	Lead
CIS	1–3 Feb 2021	1,838	3.9	16.3	19.7	5.0	2.9	2.9	2.6	9.6	1.1	11.9	24.2	3.4
CIS	2–15 Jan 2021	4,106	5.0	16.8	19.0	4.4	2.8	3.0	1.6	8.7	0.4	9.6	28.8	2.2

=== Victory likelihood ===
The table below lists opinion polling on the perceived likelihood of victory for each party in the event of a regional election taking place.

Polling firm/Commissioner	Fieldwork date	Sample size	Cs	ERC	PSC	ECP	CUP	PP	Vox	JxCat	PDeCAT	Other/ None	Question	Lead
CIS	1–3 Feb 2021	1,838	0.4	32.6	17.7	0.4	0.2	0.3	0.4	8.2	0.3	2.4	37.1	14.9
GESOP/El Periódico	25–28 Jan 2021	1,445	–	28.3	24.9	–	–	–	–	7.2	–	1.1	38.4	3.4
CIS	2–15 Jan 2021	4,106	0.4	46.2	8.6	0.5	0.0	0.8	0.2	7.0	0.5	1.3	34.4	37.6
GESOP/El Periódico	4–7 Jan 2021	801	0.3	45.3	11.3	0.5	0.1	0.9	0.1	8.1	0.4	–	33.1	34.0

=== Preferred President ===
The table below lists opinion polling on leader preferences to become president of the Government of Catalonia.

Color key:

Poll conducted after legal ban on opinion polls

Polling firm/Commissioner	Fieldwork date	Sample size													Other/ None/ Not care	Question	Lead
Polling firm/Commissioner	Fieldwork date	Sample size	Carrizosa Cs	Aragonès ERC	Iceta PSC	Illa PSC	Albiach ECP	Riera CUP	Sabater CUP	Fernández PP	Garriga Vox	Puigdem. JxCat	Borràs JxCat	Chacón PDeCAT	Other/ None/ Not care	Question	Lead
GESOP/El Periòdic	10–12 Feb 2021	854	2.9	14.1	–	23.4	5.6	–	5.0	2.1	1.6	–	14.1	1.6	29.5		9.3
GESOP/El Periòdic	9–11 Feb 2021	806	3.3	13.1	–	24.8	5.0	–	4.5	1.7	1.7	–	14.7	2.3	28.9		10.1
GESOP/El Periòdic	8–10 Feb 2021	757	2.8	13.8	–	23.7	4.1	–	3.9	0.9	1.9	–	14.0	2.3	32.5		9.7
GESOP/El Periòdic	7–9 Feb 2021	754	2.0	14.5	–	24.2	3.2	–	4.0	1.3	1.9	–	15.3	2.0	31.6		8.9
GESOP/El Periòdic	6–8 Feb 2021	752	1.9	14.3	–	22.7	3.8	–	4.8	1.2	1.4	–	15.1	0.9	33.7		7.6
GESOP/El Periódico	4–6 Feb 2021	751	1.9	14.3	–	23.0	4.5	–	4.4	1.5	1.1	–	13.9	1.5	12.8	20.6	8.7
CIS	1–3 Feb 2021	1,838	1.8	10.6	–	23.5	2.6	–	2.7	2.0	1.1	–	10.4	1.5	22.3	21.4	12.9
DYM/Henneo	29 Jan–2 Feb 2021	1,259	4.1	19.7	–	33.9	6.4	–	6.5	2.5	2.5	–	19.0	3.2	2.3	–	14.2
GESOP/El Periódico	25–28 Jan 2021	1,445	2.0	13.1	–	18.8	2.6	–	4.1	1.4	1.1	–	12.5	0.9	16.6	26.8	5.7
CIS	2–15 Jan 2021	4,106	3.4	9.0	–	22.0	2.6	–	2.8	1.7	1.1	2.8	11.1	1.2	16.4	25.8	10.9
GAD3/La Vanguardia	4–8 Jan 2021	800	5.3	12.4	–	24.3	6.7	–	5.3	5.1	2.5	–	16.9	3.7	17.8		7.4
GESOP/El Periódico	4–7 Jan 2021	801	2.1	13.6	–	24.4	2.4	–	3.4	2.2	1.2	–	14.4	1.8	16.0	18.5	10.0
GESOP/El Periódico	30 Nov–1 Dec 2020	801	1.7	14.0	15.9	–	2.8	3.2	–	1.4	1.0	–	14.7	2.8	20.5	22.7	1.2

== Voter turnout ==
The table below shows registered voter turnout during the election. Figures for election day do not include non-resident citizens, while final figures do.

Province	Time (Election day)									Final		
Province	13:00			18:00			20:00			Final		
Province	2017	2021	+/–	2017	2021	+/–	2017	2021	+/–	2017	2021	+/–
Barcelona	34.59%	22.48%	−12.11	68.59%	45.81%	−22.78	82.30%	53.73%	−28.57	79.32%	51.40%	−27.92
Girona	35.36%	24.30%	−11.06	68.48%	46.99%	−21.49	81.51%	54.75%	−26.76	79.16%	52.75%	−26.41
Lleida	34.08%	24.14%	−9.94	66.04%	45.95%	−20.09	80.62%	54.70%	−25.92	77.11%	51.92%	−25.19
Tarragona	35.11%	22.68%	−12.43	66.84%	42.77%	−24.07	80.41%	50.37%	−30.04	78.41%	48.86%	−29.55
Total	34.69%	22.77%	–11.92	68.26%	45.61%	–22.65	81.94%	53.53%	–28.41	79.09%	51.29%	–27.80

== Results ==
=== Overall ===
← Summary of the 14 February 2021 Parliament of Catalonia election results →
Parties and alliances	Popular vote			Seats	
Parties and alliances	Votes	%	±pp	Total	+/−
Socialists' Party of Catalonia (PSC–PSOE)	654,766	23.03	+9.17	33	+16
Republican Left of Catalonia (ERC)	605,581	21.30	−0.08	33	+1
Together for Catalonia (JxCat)^{1}	570,539	20.07	n/a	32	+12
Vox (Vox)	218,121	7.67	New	11	+11
In Common We Can–We Can In Common (ECP–PEC)^{2}	195,345	6.87	−0.59	8	±0
Popular Unity Candidacy–A New Cycle to Win (CUP–G)	189,924	6.68	+2.22	9	+5
Citizens–Party of the Citizenry (Cs)	158,606	5.58	−19.77	6	−30
People's Party (PP)	109,453	3.85	−0.39	3	−1
Catalan European Democratic Party (PDeCAT)^{1}	77,229	2.72	n/a	0	−14
Zero Cuts–Green Group–Municipalists (Recortes Cero–GV–M)	12,783	0.45	+0.21	0	±0
Primaries for the Independence of Catalonia Movement (MPIC)	6,017	0.21	New	0	±0
National Front of Catalonia (FNC)	5,003	0.18	New	0	±0
Nationalist Party of Catalonia (PNC)	4,560	0.16	New	0	±0
Communist Party of the Workers of Catalonia (PCTC)	4,515	0.16	New	0	±0
Left in Positive (IZQP)	2,073	0.07	New	0	±0
We Are the Ebre Lands (Som Terres de l'Ebre)	1,415	0.05	New	0	±0
For a Fairer World (PUM+J)	1,339	0.05	+0.04	0	±0
European Union of Pensioners (UEP)	635	0.02	New	0	±0
Blank Seats (EB)	591	0.02	New	0	±0
United for Democracy+Retirees (Unidos SI–DEf–PDSJE–Somos España)	429	0.02	New	0	±0
Alliance for Commerce and Housing (Alianza CV)	173	0.01	New	0	±0
Catalan Civil Support (SCAT)	137	0.00	New	0	±0
Red Current Movement (MCR)	94	0.00	New	0	±0
Blank ballots	24,087	0.85	+0.41		
Total	2,843,415			135	±0
Valid votes	2,843,415	98.56	−1.07		
Invalid votes	41,430	1.44	+1.07		
Votes cast / turnout	2,884,845	51.29	−27.80		
Abstentions	2,739,222	48.71	+27.80		
Registered voters	5,624,067				
Sources
Footnotes: ^{1} Within the Together for Catalonia alliance in the 2017 election.; ^{2} In Common We Can–We Can In Common results are compared to Catalonia in Common–We Can totals in the 2017 election.

Popular vote
PSC–PSOE	23.03%
ERC	21.30%
JxCat	20.07%
Vox	7.67%
ECP–PEC	6.87%
CUP–G	6.68%
Cs	5.58%
PP	3.85%
PDeCAT	2.72%
Others	1.40%
Blank ballots	0.85%

Seats
PSC–PSOE	24.44%
ERC	24.44%
JxCat	23.70%
Vox	8.15%
CUP–G	6.67%
ECP–PEC	5.93%
Cs	4.44%
PP	2.22%

=== Distribution by constituency ===
Constituency	PSC		ERC		JxCat		Vox		ECP–PEC		CUP–G		Cs		PP	
Constituency	%	S	%	S	%	S	%	S	%	S	%	S	%	S	%	S
Barcelona	25.0	23	20.4	19	17.9	16	7.8	7	7.8	7	6.3	5	6.1	5	4.0	3
Girona	15.2	3	21.8	4	32.7	7	6.1	1	4.0	−	9.0	2	3.3	−	2.0	−
Lleida	15.0	3	26.6	5	28.0	5	5.5	1	3.2	−	7.4	1	3.2	−	3.5	−
Tarragona	20.0	4	24.5	5	19.4	4	9.4	2	4.9	1	6.8	1	5.2	1	4.3	−
Total	23.0	33	21.3	33	20.1	32	7.7	11	6.9	8	6.7	9	5.6	6	3.8	3

== Aftermath ==
=== Government formation ===
Acting president Pere Aragonès (ERC) stood for president in a vote in the legislature on 26 March 2021, but failed due to divisions in the independence movement. He was supported by ERC and the CUP, but the rival JxCat party abstained, meaning he received only 42 votes (of 68 required), to 61 against. A second vote, requiring only a simple majority, took place on 30 March and also failed, with ERC and the CUP again voting to support his candidacy and JxCat abstaining. The three parties finally reached agreement on 17 May 2021, and Aragonès was elected with the votes of ERC, JxCat and CUP.

Investiture; Nomination of Pere Aragonès (ERC)
Ballot →	26 March 2021	30 March 2021
Required majority →	68 out of 135	Simple
Yes: • ERC (33); • CUP–G (9)	42 / 135	42 / 135
No: • PSC (33); • Vox (11); • ECP–PEC (8); • Cs (6); • PP (3)	61 / 135	61 / 135
Abstentions: • JxCat (32)	32 / 135	32 / 135
Absentees	0 / 135	0 / 135

Investiture; Nomination of Pere Aragonès (ERC)
Ballot →	21 May 2021
Required majority →	68 out of 135
Yes: • ERC (33); • JxCat (32); • CUP–G (9)	74 / 135
No: • PSC (33); • Vox (11); • ECP–PEC (8); • Cs (6); • PP (3)	61 / 135
Abstentions	0 / 135
Absentees	0 / 135

== Bibliography ==
- Ley Orgánica 4/1979, de 18 de diciembre, de Estatuto de Autonomía de Cataluña (Organic Law 4/1979). Official State Gazette (in Spanish). 18 December 1979. BOE-A-1979-30178.
- Ley Orgánica 5/1985, de 19 de junio, del Régimen Electoral General (Organic Law 5/1985). Official State Gazette (in Spanish). 19 June 1985 [version as of 25 June 2019]. BOE-A-1985-11672.
- Ley Orgánica 6/2006, de 19 de julio, de reforma del Estatuto de Autonomía de Cataluña (Organic Law 6/2006). Official State Gazette (in Spanish). 19 July 2006 [version as of 19 January 2011]. BOE-A-2006-13087.
- Ley 13/2008, de 5 de noviembre, de la presidencia de la Generalidad y del Gobierno (Law 13/2008). Official State Gazette (in Spanish). 5 November 2008 [version as of 25 April 2019]. BOE-A-2008-19526.
- Decreto 147/2020, de 21 de diciembre, de disolución automática del Parlamento de Cataluña y de convocatoria de elecciones (PDF) (Decree 147/2020). Official Journal of the Government of Catalonia (in Spanish). 21 December 2020. DOGC-B-20356146-2020.
- Decreto 1/2021, de 15 de enero, por el que se deja sin efecto la celebración de las elecciones al Parlamento de Cataluña del 14 de febrero de 2021 debido a la crisis sanitaria derivada de la pandemia causada por la COVID-19 (PDF) (Decree 1/2021). Official Journal of the Government of Catalonia (in Spanish). 15 January 2021. DOGC-B-21015105-2021.
