= Free (political party) =

Free Lliures
- President: Antoni Fernández Teixidó
- Secretary-General: Joaquim Álvarez Botey
- Founded: 26 October 2016
- Registered: 13 December 2016
- Dissolved: 27 January 2022
- Split from: Democratic Convergence of Catalonia/Catalan European Democratic Party; Democratic Union of Catalonia
- Merged into: Centrem
- Headquarters: C/ Muntaner, 248, 2º-1ª 08021, Barcelona
- Ideology: Catalan nationalism; Liberalism
- Political position: Centre to centre-right
- Colors: Pink
- Slogan: Un partit nou, un nou estil ("A new party, a new style")

Website
- www.elslliures.cat

Free (Catalan: Lliures) was a Catalan political party founded in October 2016 and registered in December by former members of Democratic Convergence of Catalonia (CDC) and Democratic Union of Catalonia (UDC), including former CDC regional minister in Jordi Pujol's sixth government Antoni Fernández Teixidó as well as former UDC deputy Roger Montañola. It defined itself as a liberal and Catalanist party opposed to Catalan independence, and since its inception it struggled to form a unitary Catalanist electoral alliance mirroring the political platform of the late Convergence and Union.

On 27 January 2022, the party decided to dissolve itself and merged into Centrem.

== History ==
The party had collected the required signatures for contesting the 2017 Catalan regional election, but it ultimately declined to do so on the grounds because of the existing "strong political polarization"—resulting from the enforcement of direct rule over Catalonia following the events sparked by the 1 October independence referendum—being "inauspicious for the Catalanist centre".

Ahead of the 2019 Barcelona municipal election, the party sought an alliance with the electoral platform of former Prime Minister of France Manuel Valls, but disagreements and alleged breaches of the alliance pact that both parties had signed earlier in the year led to Teixidó's resigning as party president. The party also voiced its opposition to Valls's involvement in the 10 February 2019 demonstration in Madrid against Pedro Sánchez's national government because of it "only favouring Vox", a far-right political party which had been surging in national polling in the aftermath of the 2018 Andalusian regional election. In September 2019, party members in disagreement with the party's policy of coalescing into a Catalanist political platform formed an internal current, dubbed as "2 July spirit", supportive of allying with Valls after the latter's break up with Citizens (Cs) to contest future elections.

The party also attended the "Poblet Meeting" on 21 September 2019, together with about 200 members from the PDeCAT's more moderate sectors, seeking to discuss the political future of the post-convergent political space and its drift towards unilateralism under former Catalan president Carles Puigdemont's National Call for the Republic (CNxR) and his growing influence over CDC's successor, the Catalan European Democratic Party (PDeCAT). Among those attending the Meeting were former PDeCAT coordinator-general Marta Pascal, party colleagues Carles Campuzano, Jordi Xuclà, Marta Pigem or Lluis Recoder, as well as members from other parties aside of Lliures (such as Ramon Espadaler and Albert Batlle from United to Advance (Els Units)).

The party had scheduled its merge with the similarly aligned Democratic League (LD) in a party congress to be held in March 2020. The congress was delayed and then suspended as a result of the COVID-19 pandemic in Spain, and new developments up until June 2020 saw Lliures disengaging from the initial merger idea in favour of constituting a broader electoral alliance that could also comprise other parties, such as Els Units or the newly founded Nationalist Party of Catalonia (PNC). On 15 July 2020, it was announced that the party would be forming an electoral alliance with LD and Convergents (CNV) to contest the 2021 Catalan regional election, on the basis of a joint programme pushing for an expansion of Catalan self-government and a solidary fiscal agreement, as well as opposing Catalan independence and unilateralism.
