= Democratic League (Catalonia) =

Democratic League Lliga Democràtica
- Abbreviation: LD
- President: Astrid Barrio
- Secretary-General: Sílvia Requena
- Founded: 7 August 2019
- Registered: 13 December 2019
- Headquarters: C/ Balmes 211, Ppal 2ª 08006, Barcelona
- Ideology: Catalanism; Regionalism; Christian democracy Liberalism; Federalism; Liberal conservatism Pro-Europeanism
- Political position: Centre-right

Website
- lliga.cat

Democratic League (Catalan: Lliga Democràtica, LD) is a Catalan political party founded in August 2019 by Astrid Barrio and former president of Catalan Civil Society Josep Ramon Bosch, aiming to lead the space of the "centre-right, moderate Catalanism" but pushing for political dialogue, agreement and good government and "with full respect to the Constitution". The party was officially registered in the interior ministry on 13 December 2019. In July 2020, former Democratic Convergence of Catalonia (CDC) deputy and Convergents (CNV) member Sílvia Requena became its new secretary-general.

== History ==
Ever since its inception, the Democratic League has been in search for other political actors to form an electoral platform able to occupy the "orphaned" political space left by the dissolution of the late Convergence and Union (CiU), having probed other similarly-aligned parties such as Free (Lliures) to coalesce into a new political party, in a congress scheduled for March 2020. The COVID-19 outbreak in Spain forced the congress's suspension, and new developments up until June 2020 saw Lliures disengaging from the initial merger idea and proposing instead to constitute an electoral alliance that was able to attract other parties, such as the newly-founded Nationalist Party of Catalonia (PNC) and the successor of the late Democratic Union of Catalonia (UDC), United to Advance (Els Units).

On 15 July 2020, it was announced that the party would be forming an electoral alliance with Lliures and Convergents (CNV) to contest the 2021 Catalan regional election, on the basis of a joint programme pushing for an expansion of Catalan self-government and a solidary fiscal agreement, as well as opposing Catalan independence and unilateralism.
