= Left Independentists =

Left Independentists Independentistes d'Esquerres
- Abbreviation: IdE
- President: Josep Andreu
- General Secretary: Josep Guia
- Founded: 5 September 2020
- Preceded by: Independentists of the Left
- Ideology: Catalan independence Catalan nationalism
- Political position: Left-wing
- National affiliation: Together for Catalonia
- Colours: Catalan national colours: Red; Yellow
- Slogan: "We move towards the Republic" (Catalan: Avancem cap a la República)
- Parliament of Catalonia: 1 / 135

Website
- independentistesiesquerres.cat

Left Independentists (Catalan: Independentistes d'Esquerres, IdE) is a Catalan nationalist political platform founded on 5 September 2020 in support of Catalan independence. The platform ran within the Together for Catalonia (JxCat) party in the 2021 Catalan regional election, securing one seat.
