= Àngels Chacón =

Spanish politician (born 1968)

The Honourable Àngels Chacón
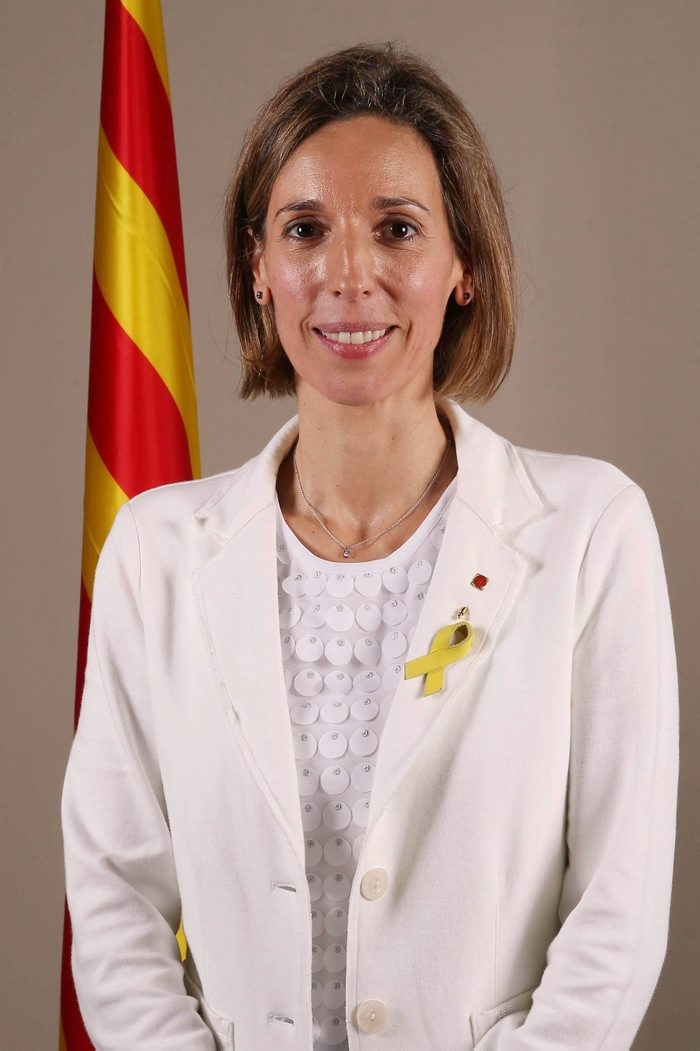
- Chacón in June 2018

Minister of Enterprise and Knowledge of Catalonia
- In office 2 June 2018 – 3 September 2020
- President: Quim Torra
- Preceded by: Josep Rull (Direct rule from 27 October 2017)
- Succeeded by: Ramon Tremosa

Secretary General of the Catalan European Democratic Party
- In office 13 June 2021 – 22 December 2021
- President: David Bonvehí
- Deputy: Marc Solsona
- Preceded by: Office established
- Succeeded by: Vacant

Member of the Municipality Council of Igualada
- In office 2011–2018

Personal details
- Born: Maria Àngels Chacón i Feixas; 1968 (age 57–58) Igualada, Catalonia, Spain
- Party: Centrem (2022–2023); Catalan European Democratic Party (2016–2022); Independent (2011–2016)
- Education: University of Barcelona

Maria Àngels Chacón i Feixas (born 1968) is a Spanish politician from Catalonia who served as Minister of Enterprise and Knowledge of the Catalan government.

== Early life ==
Chacón was born in 1968 in Igualada, Catalonia. She has a degree in law from the University of Barcelona and is a specialist in international trade.

== Career ==
Chacón has worked as export director for several companies in the paper sector. She was commercial director for Juan Romaní Esteve and was in charge of export for Manipulados del Noya. She was general-secretary of the Anoia Business Union, an organisation that represents 850 partners and 2,400 companies, from 2008 to 2011.

Chacón was co-ordination of the Urbact 3D Cities (economic growth and innovation in health) and Urbact Retailink (economic growth and commercial strategy innovation in medium-sized cities) projects and has been co-director of the 4D Health Patient Safety Simulation Innovation Center since 2009. In June 2017 she was appointed director-general of industry in the Generalitat de Catalunya's Department of Business and Knowledge.

Chacón contested the 2011 local elections as an independent Convergence and Union (CiU) electoral alliance candidate in Igualada and was elected. After the election she was appointed second deputy mayor in charge of economy, trade and tourism. She was re-elected at the 2015 local elections. After the election she was appointed first deputy mayor in charge of economy, knowledge, internationalisation and interior. She joined the Catalan European Democratic Party (PDeCAT) after it was formed.

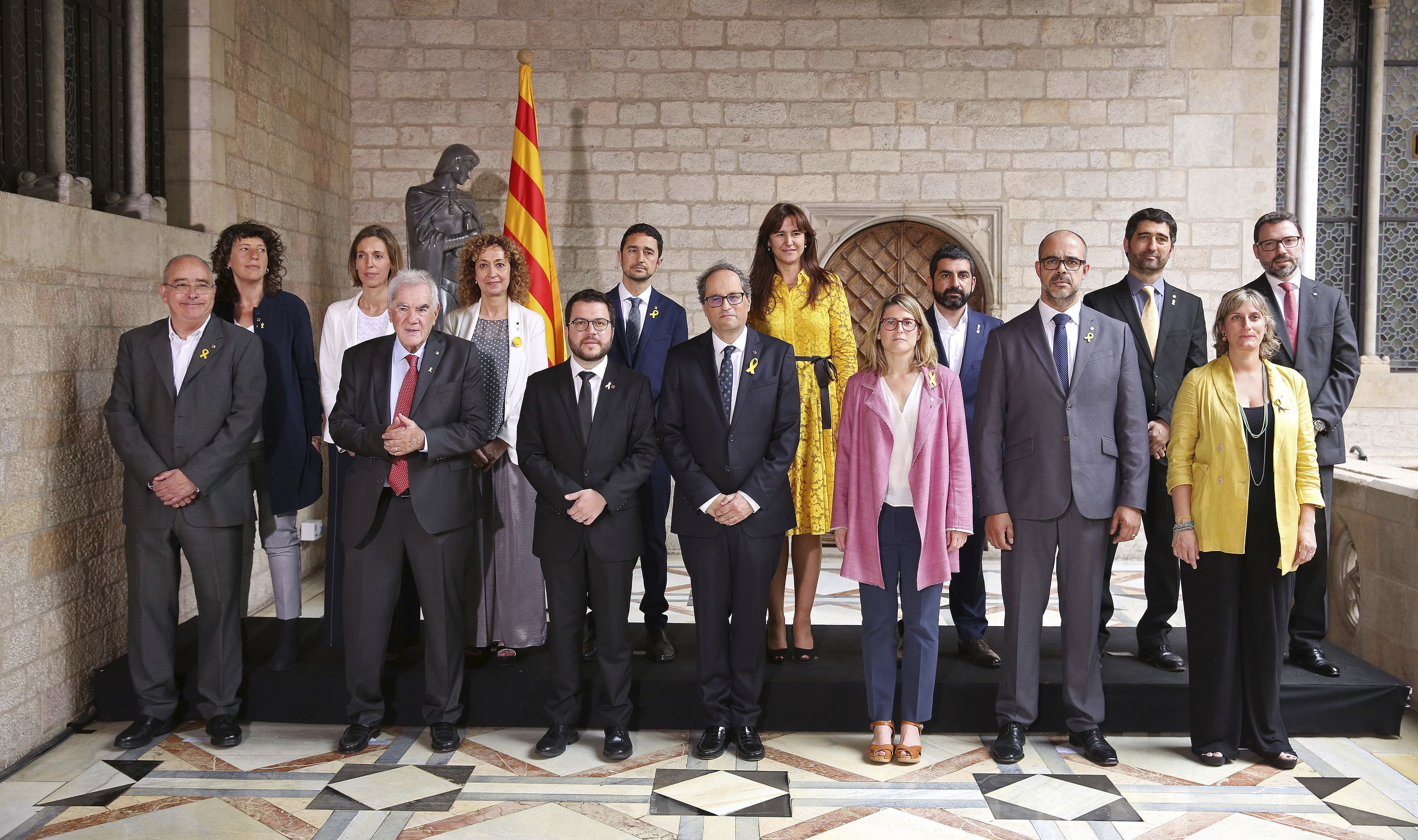
Chacón and other members of the Catalan government on 2 June 2018

On 19 May 2018 newly elected President of Catalonia Quim Torra nominated a new government in which Elsa Artadi was to be Minister of Enterprise and Knowledge. However, the Spanish government condemned the inclusion of jailed/exiled politicians in the government as provocative and refused to approve Torra's appointments or to revoke direct rule. Faced with this opposition Torra announced a new government on 29 May 2018 without the jailed/exiled politicians. Chacón was to be Minister of Enterprise and Knowledge in the new government. She was sworn in on 2 June 2018 at the Palau de la Generalitat de Catalunya.

== Electoral history ==
Electoral history of Àngels Chacón
Election	Constituency	Party	Alliance	No.	Result
2011 local	Igualada	Independent	Convergence and Union	3	Elected
2015 local	Igualada	Independent	Convergence and Union	3	Elected
