= Roger Montañola =

Spanish politician (born 1986)

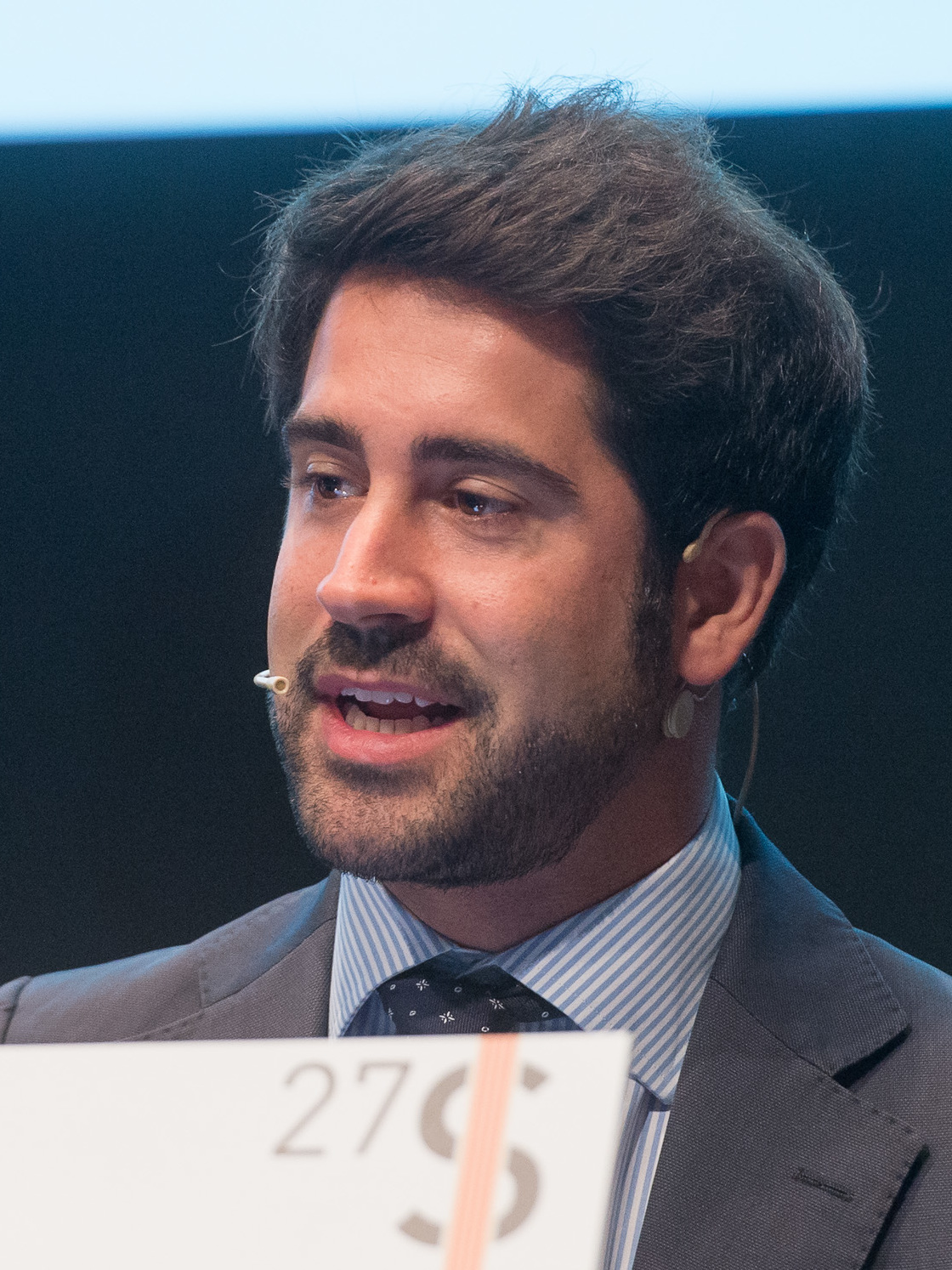
Roger Montañola in 2015.

Roger Montañola i Busquets (born 29 March 1986) is a Spanish politician and political scientist, who was a member of the Parliament of Catalonia within the Convergence i Unió parliamentary group. A member of the Democratic Union of Catalonia (UDC) until 2016, he was one of the promoters of Lliures.

== Biography ==
Montañola was born in Barcelona, and joined the Democratic Union of Catalonia at the age of eighteen.

Graduated in Political Science from Pompeu Fabra University, he has a postgraduate degree in Local Governance from the Autonomous University of Barcelona and has completed a program on Leadership in Public Management at IESE - University of Navarra. In 2006, he completed part of his studies in Göteborg, Sweden.

In 2009, he became secretary general of the Unió de Joves at the UDC, and was also part of the Permanent Commission of the Democratic Union and the CENF of Convergence and Union.

From 2007 to 2011, he was a councillor in Premiá de Mar. From 2010 to 2012, he was a deputy in the Parliament of Catalonia.

In March 2016 he founded the platform "Twenty50" together with Xavier Cima and Xavier Salvatella. In November of that year, Montañola, then linked to the Lliures movement (which would choose to become a political party in 2017), announced his withdrawal from the UDC, alleging an incompatibility between his status as a member of the UDC and that of an activist in another motion.

He was the lead candidate for the Catalan European Democratic Party in the 2023 Spanish general election.
