= Ramon Tremosa =

Catalan economist and politician

The Honorable Ramon Tremosa
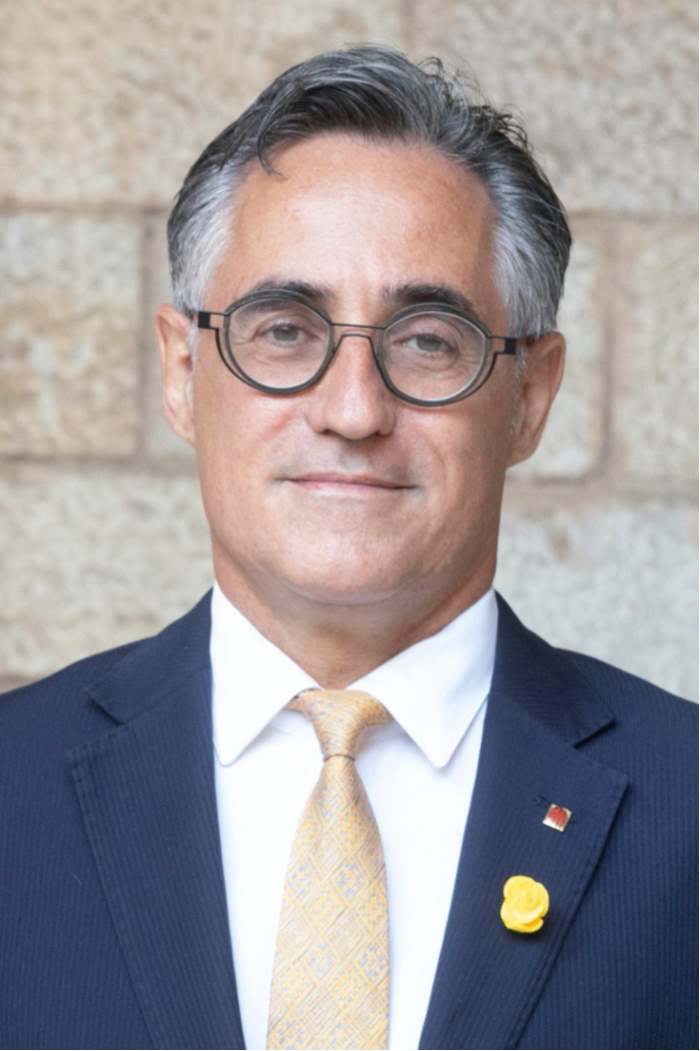
- Official portrait

Minister of Enterprise and Knowledge of Catalonia
- In office 3 September 2020 – 21 May 2021
- President: Quim Torra
- Preceded by: Maria Àngels Chacón
- Succeeded by: Gemma Geis

Member of the European Parliament
- In office 30 June 2009 – 16 April 2019
- Constituency: Spain

Member of the Parliament of Catalonia
- In office 12 March 2021 – 19 March 2024
- Constituency: Lleida

Member of the Barcelona City Council
- In office 17 June 2023 – 2024

Personal details
- Born: Ramon Tremosa i Balcells; 30 June 1965 (age 60) Barcelona, Catalonia, Spain
- Party: Junts
- Other political affiliations: Independent politician (formerly)
- Occupation: Economist and politician

Ramon Tremosa i Balcells (Barcelona, 30 June 1965) is a Catalan economist and politician, professor at the Department of Economic Theory at the University of Barcelona, where he obtained his Doctorate about the influence of macroeconomic policy in the Catalan manufacturing industry (1983 - 1995). From 2009 onwards he has been independent MEP for Convergència i Unió and has been re-elected in 2014. He is author of various books and academic articles about monetary politics, fiscal federalism and regional economics.

== Early life and education ==
Ramon Tremosa was born in Barcelona on the 30th of June in a family originally from Lleida (his father is from Arenys de Noguera, Ribagorça and his Mother from el Poal, Pla d´Urgell). Until the age of 15 he lived in Sant Boi de Llobregat, Barcelona where he attended school at Don-Bosco. Later, he moved to the popular area of Gracia in Barcelona, where he finished school at La Salle.

In 1992 Tremosa completed his undergraduate studies at the University of Barcelona and combined his studies with work in the field of tax consultancy from 1987 onwards. Seven years later, in 1999, he completed his doctorate at the University of Barcelona, where he has lectured since 1992. Tremosa did his thesis in the Autonomous University of Barcelona about the influence of the monetary policy on the Catalan manufacturing industry (1983 - 1995). In 1999 he also completed a Master in Applied Economic Analysis at the University Pompeu Fabra. It is worth mentioning he was in 2006 one of the promoters of the vote against the Catalan Statute of Autonomy.

== Political career ==
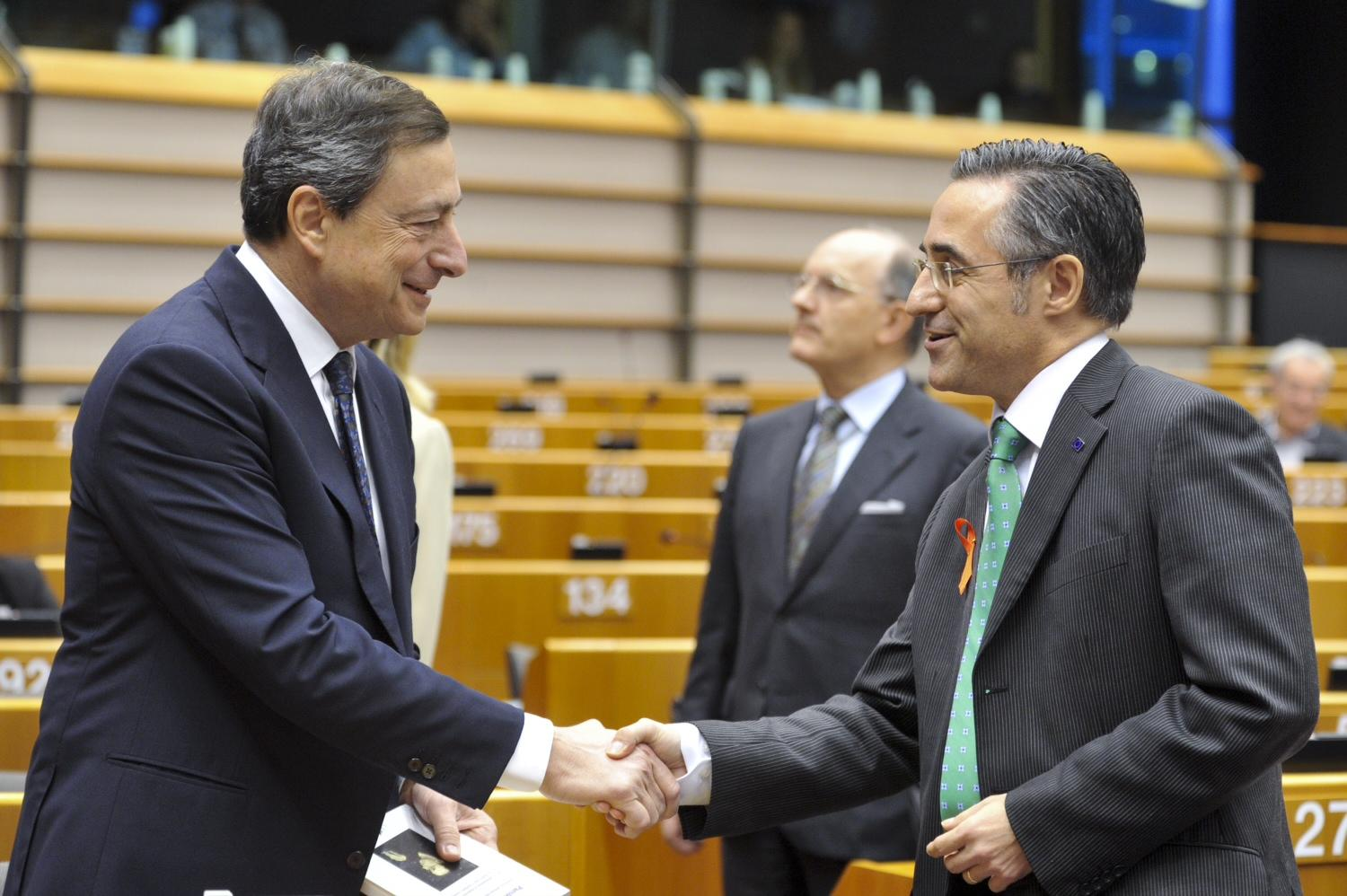
Ramon Tremosa with Mario Draghi, then President of the European Central Bank as elected speaker of the yearly report

Tremosa was leader of the list as independent candidate for the Catalan party Convergència i Unió (CiU) and was elected MEP at the European Parliament in the 2009 European elections. He has since been serving on the Committee on Economic and Monetary Affairs. In this capacity, he drafted reports on the supervision of the European financial system (2010), the report of the European Central Bank (2011) and competition (2012).

Between 2009 and 2014 Tremosa also served as a substitute on the Committee on Transport and Tourism, where he actively took part in the debates about the Mediterranean Corridor, the Single European Railway Directive (2012) and the discussions about a common agrarian policy.

In May 2014 Tremosa was re-elected. In 2014, he co-sponsored (with Andreas Schwab) a non-binding bill before the European Parliament calling on the European Commission to consider separating Google’s search-engine business from its other commercial activities to ensure fair competition on the internet. He currently serves as the Parliament's rapporteur on the annual report of the European Central Bank. From 2016 until 2017, Tremosa was part of the Parliament's Committee of Inquiry into Money Laundering, Tax Avoidance and Tax Evasion (PANA) that investigated the Panama Papers revelations and tax avoidance schemes more broadly.

From 2021 to 2024, he was a member of the Catalan Parliament, and from 2023 to 2024, a member of Barcelona City Council.

== Other activities ==
- Barcelona Institute for Global Health (ISGlobal), Member of the Board of Trustees
- Since April 2025, he has been an independent director of the Board of Directors of Aena S.M.E., S.A.

== Political positions ==
During his time in the European Parliament, Tremosa was one of the main defenders of the official use of Catalan language in the European institutions, the guarantee of a minimum flow for the Ebro river and the fight against monopolies, which he regards a threat to the free market.

== Books ==
- Competitivitat de l´economia catalana en l´horitzó 2010: Effectes macroeconòmics del dèfiit fiscal amb l´Estat espanyol (Competitivity of the Catalan economy in the horizon 2010: Macroeconomic effects of the fiscal deficit with the Spanish State) - 2003
- Polítiques públiques: Una visió renovada (Public politics: An updated perspective) - 2004
- L´espoli fiscal. Una asfíxia premeditada (The spanish fiscal system, a premeditated asphyxia) - 2004
- Estatut de Catalunya, veritats contra mentides (Statute of Catalan Autonomy: Truths against lies) - 2005
- Estatut, aeroports i ports de peix al cove (Satate of Catalan Autonomy, centralized airports and harbours) - 2006
- Catalunya serà logística o no serà (Catalonia will be logistic or it will not be) - 2007
- Catalunya, país emergent (Catalonia, emerging economy) - 2008
- Ramón Tremosa, el Sobiranisme necessari (Ramon Tremosa, the necessary sovereignty) - 2009
- Catalonia, An Emerging Economy (Catalonia, an emerging economy) - 2010
- Let Catalonia Vote (Let Catalonia vote) - 2015
- Cinquanta són cinquanta (50 are 50) - 2015

== Academic articles ==
- The Catalan finance mechanism
- Business cycle in the catalan manufacturing industry (1983-1995): Microeconomic convergence with Europe and influence of the monetary policy in the enterprises profitability, according to the E.U. database BACH"..

== Bibliography ==
- Ramon Tremosa, at blocs.mesvilaweb.cat
- Ramon Tremosa homepage
- "Inicio | Eurodiputados | Parlamento Europeo".
