= Nationalist Party of Catalonia =

Nationalist Party of Catalonia Partit Nacionalista de Catalunya
- Abbreviation: PNC
- President: Olga Tortosa Marín
- Secretary-General: Marta Pascal
- Founded: 12 May 2020
- Split from: Catalan European Democratic Party
- Headquarters: Rambla Catalunya, 94, 1º-1ª 08008, Barcelona
- Ideology: Catalan nationalism Liberalism; Pro-Europeanism
- Political position: Centre to centre-right

Website
- pnc.cat

The Nationalist Party of Catalonia (Catalan: Partit Nacionalista de Catalunya, PNC) is a Catalan nationalist and liberal political party in Catalonia. The party was established on 12 May 2020 by former Catalan European Democratic Party (PDeCAT) coordinator-general Marta Pascal. It held its founding congress on 27 June 2020, under a political manifesto in which they announce their commitment to an agreed referendum as the solution for the issue of Catalan independence.

== History ==
The origins of the party can be traced to "The Country of Tomorrow" think tank (Catalan: El Pais de Demà), launched on 21 September 2019 during the so-called "Poblet Meeting" attended by about 200 members from the PDeCAT's more moderate sectors to discuss the political future of the post-Democratic Convergence of Catalonia (CDC) and its drift towards unilateralism under former Catalan president Carles Puigdemont's National Call for the Republic (CNxR). Among those attending the Meeting were former PDeCAT coordinator-general Marta Pascal, party colleagues Carles Campuzano, Jordi Xuclà, Marta Pigem or Lluis Recoder, as well as members from other parties (Antoni Fernández Teixidó and Roger Montañola from Free (Lliures), Ramon Espadaler and Albert Batlle from United to Advance (Els Units)). On 7 March 2020, the "Poblet Group" agreed to establish a new, moderate Catalan nationalist party ahead of the next Catalan regional election, unveiled on 12 May as the Nationalist Party of Catalonia (PNC).

The party's name had been registered in the interior ministry since April 1978, by members from CDC, Democratic Union of Catalonia (UDC) and Democratic Left of Catalonia (EDC), as a monicker for a possible merger of the three parties ahead of the 1979 Spanish general election and 1980 Catalan regional election. In the end, only EDC ended up merging with CDC, whereas the latter and UDC formed the long-lasting Convergence and Union (CiU) alliance. The Nationalist Youth of Catalonia (JNC), CDC's youth wing, was originally founded in anticipation of its mother party ultimately being the PNC.

On 27 April 2020, Pascal announced her intention to leave the PDeCAT and join the new party out of her disagreement with the PDeCAT and Together for Catalonia's drift towards Puigdemont's personalist project, a decision made public on 17 May. On 27 June 2020, Pascal's party, the PNC, held its founding congress in which she was elected as the party's secretary-general and Olga Tortosa Marín as president, with former members from the PDeCAT and the late CiU forming the PNC's executive committee. The CNxR commented on the PNC's establishment that "no more parties are needed, but more unity".

As of mid-2020, the PNC did not rule out contesting the 2021 Catalan regional election in alliance with other political parties from the moderate Catalan nationalist spectrum, such as Els Units or Lliures.

== Ideology ==
The party aims at occupying the political and electoral space left by the dissolution of Convergence and Union (CiU), advocating for a catalanist, liberal, pro-European, moderate and bilateralist political project aimed at emulating the hegemonic success of the Basque Nationalist Party (PNV) in the Basque Country. Opposed to unilateralism, the party does not rule out the ultimate goal of Catalan independence, but taking as a priority the recovery of the trimmed 2006 Statute and the attaining of the highest possible levels of self-government. The party is opposed to the imprisonment of pro-independence politicians.
