= United to Advance =

United to Advance Units per Avançar
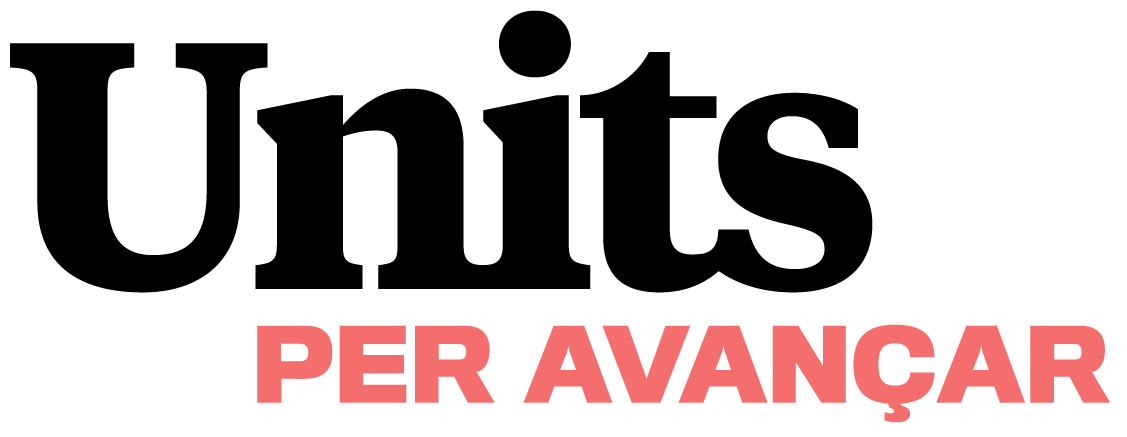
- Abbreviation: Els Units
- President: Helena Isábal
- Vice President: Xavier Güell
- Secretary-General: Ramon Espadaler
- Founded: 19 June 2017
- Registered: 26 June 2017
- Preceded by: Democratic Union of Catalonia
- Headquarters: C/ Aragó, 291; Barcelona
- Ideology: Christian democracy Catalan nationalism Spanish unionism
- Political position: Centre-right
- National affiliation: CEUS (2019–2024)
- Regional affiliation: In coalition with PSC
- Parliament of Catalonia (Note: Within the parliamentary group of the Socialist Party of Catalonia.): 2 / 135
- Local seats: 10 / 9,077

Website
- www.unitsperavancar.cat

United to Advance (Catalan: Units per Avançar, Els Units) is a Catalan Christian democratic political party founded in June 2017 by former members of the defunct Democratic Union of Catalonia (UDC) and non-independentist Catalan nationalists. The party defines itself as moderate Catalan nationalist and opposes Catalan independence.

== History ==
The party, promoted by former members of the extinct Democratic Union of Catalonia (UDC), was publicly presented in Barcelona on 19 June 2017. In its founding congress held in October 2017, the party proposed forming an electoral platform together with the Socialists' Party of Catalonia (PSC) and other actors from moderate Catalanism opposed to Catalan independence.

Units reached an electoral agreement with the PSC ahead of the 2017 Catalan regional election, under which party leader Ramon Espadaler would run as the list's third candidate for the Barcelona constituency. After the election, the party joined PSC's parliamentary group. The party renewed their alliance with the PSC for of the upcoming 2019 Spanish local elections. Concurrently, it joined the Coalition for a Solidary Europe alliance together with the Basque Nationalist Party (PNV), Canarian Coalition (CCa) and other regionalist political parties in Spain ahead of the 2019 European Parliament election.

As of March 2020, the party was in talks for an electoral alliance ahead of the 2021 Catalan regional election with "The Country of Tomorrow" think tank, which had split with the Catalan European Democratic Party (PDeCAT) in September 2019. After the latter established the Nationalist Party of Catalonia (PNC), both Els Units and the PNC did not rule out any prospective alliance.

== Electoral performance ==
=== Parliament of Catalonia ===
Parliament of Catalonia
Election	Votes	%	#	Seats	+/–	Leading candidate	Status in legislature
2017	Within PSC–PSOE			1 / 135	1	Ramon Espadaler (Note: Espalader was the leader of United to Advance in the Catalan Parliament, the leader of the PSC-Units coalition was Miquel Iceta.)	Opposition
2021	Within PSC–PSOE			1 / 135	0	Ramon Espadaler (Note: Espalader was the leader of United to Advance in the Catalan Parliament, the leader of the PSC-Units coalition was Salvador Illa.)	Opposition
2024	Within PSC–PSOE			1 / 135	0	Ramon Espadaler	Government
