= Catalan European Democratic Party =

Catalan European Democratic Party Partit Demòcrata Europeu Català
- Abbreviation: PDeCAT
- Founder: Artur Mas
- Founded: 10 July 2016
- Dissolved: 23 October 2023
- Preceded by: Democratic Convergence of Catalonia
- Headquarters: C/ Calàbria, 169, 1ª 08015, Barcelona
- Youth wing: Nationalist Youth of Catalonia (until 2020)
- Membership (2020): ▼5,000
- Ideology: Catalan independence; Catalan nationalism Liberalism
- Political position: Centre to centre-right
- Regional affiliation: Junts pel Sí (2016–2017); Together for Catalonia (2017–2020)
- European affiliation: Alliance of Liberals and Democrats for Europe (until 2018)
- Colors: Blue; Yellow

Website
- www.partitdemocrata.cat

The Catalan European Democratic Party (Catalan: Partit Demòcrata Europeu Català, PDeCAT, sometimes stylized as PDECat), initially branded as the Catalan Democratic Party (Catalan: Partit Demòcrata Català, PDC), was a liberal political party in Spain that supported Catalan independence. The party was founded in Barcelona on 10 July 2016 and dissolved on 28 October 2023. PDeCAT was regarded as the successor party to Democratic Convergence of Catalonia (CDC), which for most its history was a constituent party of the Convergence and Union (CiU) political formation. (Note: Note that while CDC was "refounded" into the PDeCAT, its trademark remains registered in the interior ministry and the party still retains full legal personality.)

The party declared to have 14,000 members in the 2018–2019 period, but this number has recently been revised down to figures as low as 5,000 as a result of internal infighting over former Catalan president Carles Puigdemont's strategy and a number of party splits.

== History ==
=== Early development ===
Democratic Convergence of Catalonia (CDC) held its last congress on 8 July 2016, in which CDC's members agreed to its "refoundation" into a new political party, whose founding congress was held in the course of the same assembly from 8 to 10 July. The reasoning behind the re-branding process often cited the presenting of a renewed trademark and a desire to disassociate the party from CDC's corruption problems, including those of its founder, Jordi Pujol, which occurred during its dominance of Catalan regional politics.

Two names were commissioned to a communication company and initially floated for the new party: "More Catalonia" (Catalan: Més Catalunya) and "Convergent Catalans" (Catalan: Catalans Convergents), but both were rejected by the party's membership who perceived them as artificial and "soulless". On 9 July, three other proposals were presented: "Together for Catalonia" (Catalan: Junts per Catalunya), "Catalan Democratic Party" (Catalan: Partit Demòcrata Català) and "Catalan National Party" (Catalan: Partit Nacional Català). In the last voting held on 10 July, "Catalan Democratic Party" topped the ballot in a 871–657 vote against "Catalan National Party". In the new party's leadership election held on 23–24 July, Artur Mas became president—continuing on the role he held in CDC—Neus Munté was elected as vice-president and Marta Pascal was appointed to the newly created post of coordinator-general.

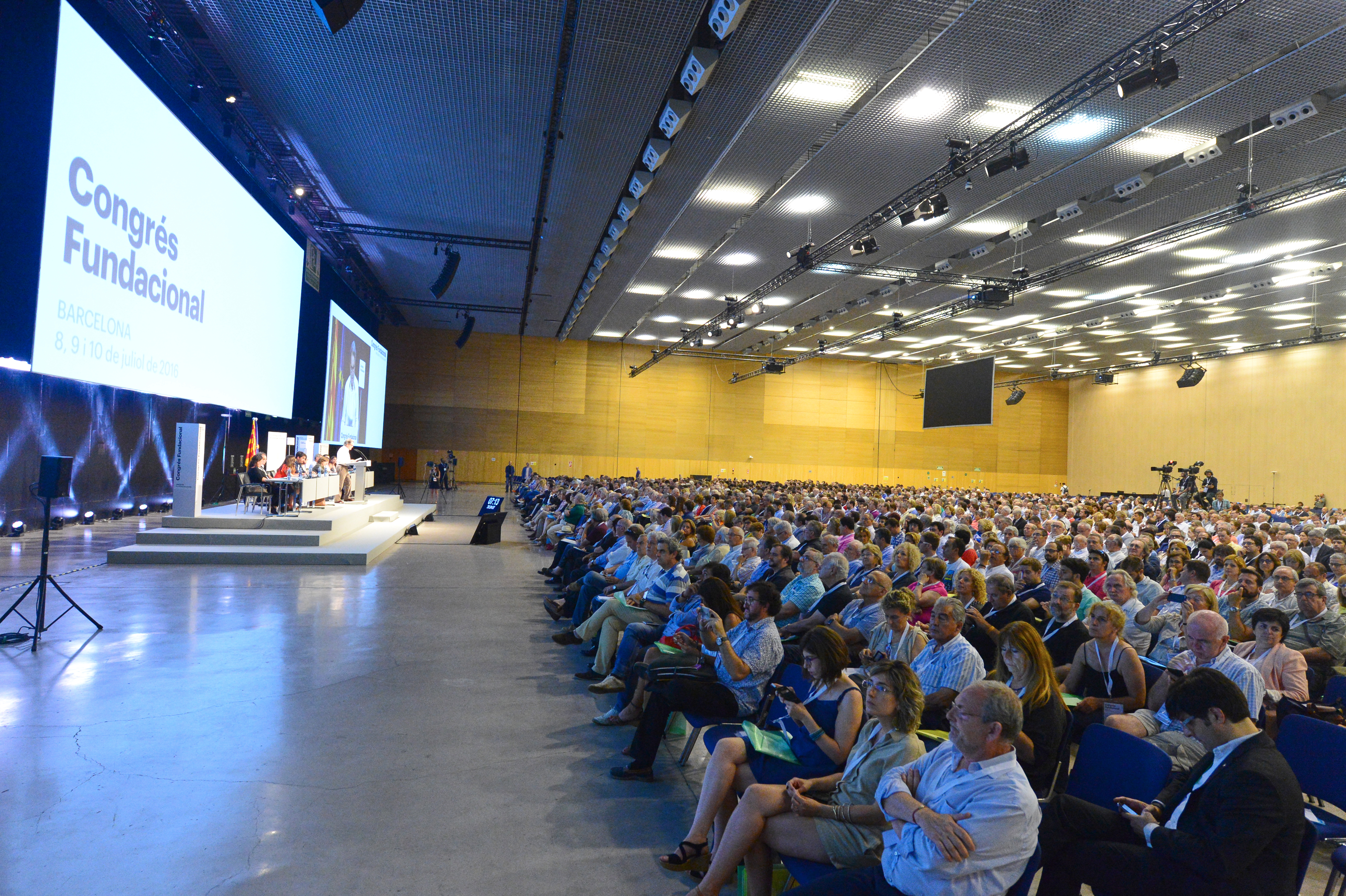
The party's founding congress in Barcelona in July 2016.

Spain's interior ministry announced the difficulty of registering the party under such name, since it could be confused with Democrats of Catalonia (DC), an existing political party which had been one of CDC's partners in the Junts pel Sí electoral alliance; this fact had already prevented a 2015 registered of a different political organization under the name "Democratic Party of Catalonia". DC's spokesman, Antoni Castellà, threatened in August that "if the PDC does not change its label, then there will be conflict within Junts pel Sí". On 20 September the party announced that it would attempt to register the party under the "Catalan European Democratic Party", but since it could result in potential conflict as well (the name "Catalan Party of Europe" had been registered by Pasqual Maragall in July 1998) the names "Catalan National Party", "Together for Catalonia", "More Catalonia" and "Catalan Democratic Pact" were also registered in case the new name was to be rejected by the interior ministry as well. The interior ministry ended up accepting the new proposed name under the PDeCAT label on 29 September, and it was subsequently ratified by party members in a ballot conducted on 21–22 October 2016.

Ever since its inception, the party struggled to maintain the political and electoral space formerly held by the late CDC. Ahead of the 2017 Catalan regional election and the exceptional circumstances around its celebration, the PDeCAT proposed ousted Catalan president Carles Puigdemont as their leading candidate, at the helm of an electoral alliance centered around the candidate under the Together for Catalonia (JxCat) label and including Puigdemont-aligned non-PDeCAT members such as Jordi Sànchez or eventual Catalan president Quim Torra. The alliance's success in the election, where it outperformed Republican Left of Catalonia (ERC) to become the dominating force within the pro-independence camp, resulted in an increase of influence for Puigdemont within the party. On 9 January 2018, Artur Mas resigned as PDeCAT president, citing disagreements with Puigdemont's plan for independence. Ahead of the party's general assembly on 21–22 July 2018, Puigdemont forced Marta Pascal's renounce as PDeCAT's coordinator-general, resulting in the appointment of a new leadership—with David Bonheví becoming new party president (replacing Munté, who had acceded the post after Mas's resignation) and Míriam Nogueras as vice-president—more supportive of Puigdemont's strategy. Concurrently, Puigdemont established his own political platform, the National Call for the Republic (CNxR), intending for the PDeCAT and its political structure to be eventually merged into it. One of Pascal's last decisions as coordinator-general of the PDeCAT was to support the motion of no confidence on the government of Mariano Rajoy that saw Pedro Sánchez replace Rajoy as Prime Minister of Spain on 1 June 2018, against Puigdemont's directions.

On 27 October 2018, the PDeCAT was voted out from the Alliance of Liberals and Democrats for Europe Party (ALDE) by a two-thirds majority of members at an extraordinary party council meeting, citing the corruption scandals affecting the late CDC's as the main driving reason behind the move, as they went "against the interests and values" of ALDE.

=== Reorganization of the space ===
Throughout 2019, discussions took place on the future of the post-CDC political space, leading to negotiations between the PDeCAT and Puigdemont to bring all three entities resulting from CDC's demise—PDeCAT, JxCat and CNxR—into a single unitary platform under the umbrella of Together for Catalonia, whose naming rights belonged to the PDeCAT. Some sectors within the party had been weary of Puigdemont's growing influence and rupturist discourse taking over the traditional moderate political space of the late CDC, as well as his frequent use of independent candidates unrelated to the party's structure. Concerns also came about Puigdemont's decision to transform the CNxR into a full-fledged political party in January 2019, as the PDeCAT leadership, while favouring some type of relationship with Puigdemont's movement, rejected any prospect of merging within another party and instead saw the CNxR as a potential competitor. In March 2020, the PDeCAT suggested the establishment of an electoral coalition rather than both parties competing each other, but this proposal went unheeded by the CNxR, and shortly after the negotiation process stalled as a result of the COVID-19 outbreak in Spain.

The resumption of talks in June 2020 revealed that the PDeCAT would keep opposing both to dissolve itself and to renounce the JxCat's trademark, while also citing that Puigdemont "had moved too to the left" in the political spectrum as one of the reasons to preserve its identity. In contrast, the CNxR did not contemplate any scenario other than the promotion of a "different" structure that had nothing to do with the late Convergence and its legacy. On 26 June, the party's executive under party president David Bonheví rejected Puigdemont's attempts to absorb the party, prompting JxCat independents and elected members to launch a public manifesto arguing for the re-organization of the Together for Catalonia political space into a full-fledged party and the PDeCAT's dissolution into it. PDeCAT members replied with another manifesto, in which they vindicated the party's identity and legacy, showing their rejection to disband the party's organizational structure into Puigdemont's personal project and criticizing what they perceived as "one thinking" from the former president's supporters because of their unwillingness to treat them as equals.

This failure in negotiations led to Puigdemont's announcement on 2 July that he would be founding a new political party aimed at bringing together supporters of unilateral independence ahead of the 2021 Catalan regional election, seeing the merger and subsequent dissolution into it of the CNxR and aligned organizations, as well as the breaking up of all ties with the PDeCAT. A political struggle ensued on the ownership of the "Together for Catalonia" trademark, with Puigdemont's supporters taking over it from the PDeCAT on 10 July by changing JxCat's party data in the interior ministry register to reflect its new ownership. The PDeCAT dubbed this as an illegal act and announced that it would challenge it, as the party still regarded the JxCat's trademark as theirs. As the change did not affect the electoral coalition—which legally comprised the PDeCAT and CDC—nor its electoral rights, an awkward situation could develop if both "Together for Catalonia" (Puigdemont's party) and "Together for Catalonia" (the PDeCAT's coalition) chose to confront each other in any future election under such labels, with the latter not ruling own an independent run. Puigdemont's party rejected using the PDeCAT's electoral rights as well as engaging into any sort of future electoral arrangement with it that did not come through its dissolution, and prompted PDeCAT members supportive to his cause to leave it en masse upon the establishment of his new party. On 24 July, Independence Rally (RI.cat), which had been associated to CDC/PDeCAT since 2013, announced that it would be joining Puigdemont's new party.

In the meantime, several current and former party members—including former coordinator-general Marta Pascal—split to form the Nationalist Party of Catalonia (PNC), out of their disagreement with the PDeCAT's drift towards unilateralism under Puigdemont's influence. The split was formalized by the PNC's founding congress on 27 June 2020, amid concerns that Puigdemont's move to found his own party could also further the split of PDeCAT's sectors more aligned to his and the CNxR's strategies.

On 29 August 2020, the party made official that it was suing Puigdemont for his "unlawful" takeover of the JxCat's trademark, sparking a defection en masse from party members aligned to the former Catalan president, including Puigdemont himself, to the new Junts party. As of early September 2020, PDeCAT still retained four legislators in the Parliament of Catalonia, four legislators in the Congress of Deputies, some prominent politicians (including former Catalan president Artur Mas, the chairwoman of the Port of Barcelona Mercè Conesa and the ex-regional minister of Enterprise and Knowledge Àngels Chacón—just removed from office in a cabinet reshuffle by Quim Torra—) as well as a number of mayors, including Marc Solsona (also a Catalan MP), the spokesperson of the party.

On 28 October 2023, the party was officially dissolved following declining electoral fortunes.

== Ideology ==
The party was described as centre-right, supportive of European integration and market-liberal policies, and was neoliberal in the economic outlook. The party described itself as Catalanist, independentist, republican, pro-Europeanist, and humanist in its ideological manifesto, defending that Catalonia is a nation with the right of self-determination, whose fixed path to achieve an independent state involves expanding the pro-independence social majority and exhausting all legal venues to reach an agreement "without renouncing the unilateral path to achieve these objectives".

== Electoral performance ==
=== Parliament of Catalonia ===
Parliament of Catalonia
Election	Votes	%	#	Seats	+/–	Leading candidate	Status in legislature
2017	Within JuntsxCat			12 / 135	17 (Note: Compared to Democratic Convergence of Catalonia totals (within the Junts pel Sí alliance) in the 2015 regional election))	Carles Puigdemont (Note: At the time of the election, Puigdemont was in self-exile in Belgium.)	Coalition (JxCat–ERC)
2017	Within JuntsxCat			12 / 135	17	Carles Puigdemont	Confidence and supply (from Sep. 2020)
2021	77,250	2.72%	9th	0 / 135	12	Àngels Chacón	No seats

=== Cortes Generales ===
==== Nationwide ====
Cortes Generales
Election	Congress					Senate		Leading candidate	Status in legislature
Election	Votes	%	#	Seats	+/–	Seats	+/–	Leading candidate	Status in legislature
2019 (Apr)	Within JxCat–Junts			4 / 350	4 (Note: Compared to Democratic Convergence of Catalonia totals in the 2016 general election.)	2 / 208	0	Jordi Sànchez (Note: At the time of the election, Sànchez was in preventive detention in Soto del Real (Madrid).)	New election
2019 (Nov)	Within JxCat–Junts			5 / 350	1	3 / 208	1	Laura Borràs	Opposition
2023	32,016	0.13%	16th	0 / 350	5	0 / 208	3	Roger Montañola	No seats

==== Regional breakdown ====
Election	Catalonia						
Election	Congress					Senate	
Election	Votes	%	#	Seats	+/–	Seats	+/–
2019 (Apr)	Within JxCat–Junts			4 / 48	4	2 / 16	0
2019 (Nov)	Within JxCat–Junts			5 / 48	1	3 / 16	1

== Symbols ==
Logo from July to October 2016.

Logo from October to December 2016.

Logo from December 2016 to July 2018.

Logo from July 2018 to October 2023.

Logo used for the elections of the year 2021
