= Unilateralism =

Doctrine or agenda that supports one-sided action

Unilateralism is any doctrine or agenda that supports one-sided action. Such action may be in disregard for other parties, or as an expression of a commitment toward a direction which other parties may find disagreeable. As a word, unilateralism is attested from 1926, specifically relating to unilateral disarmament. The current, broader meaning emerges in 1964. It stands in contrast with multilateralism, the pursuit of foreign policy goals alongside allies.

Unilateralism and multilateralism represent different policy approaches to international problems. When agreement by multiple parties is absolutely required—for example, in the context of international trade policies—bilateral agreements (involving two participants at a time) are usually preferred by proponents of unilateralism.

Unilateralism may be preferred in those instances when it is assumed to be the most efficient, i.e., in issues that can be solved without cooperation. However, a government may also have a principal preference for unilateralism or multilateralism, and, for instance, strive to avoid policies that cannot be realized unilaterally or alternatively to champion multilateral solutions to problems that could well have been solved unilaterally.

Unilateralism as a first course of action can be viewed as an act of aggression or hard power; for instance, unilateral sanctions violate the United Nations Charter and inhibit the development of developing countries.

Unilateral action is often elected on behalf of independent leaders with nationalist tendencies and a strong distrust for the intentions of other countries' intervention. In recent years, unilateral action is adjacent with nationalism, protectionism and rejection towards institutions that embody multilateral approach; e.g., the United States adopting protectionist trade policy during the mid-2010s against the multilateral interests of the World Trade Organization.

Unilateralism, if unprovoked, has the potential to disrupt the peaceful upholding of sovereignty and territorial integrity that global security depends upon. Unilateral coercive measures against smaller states put a strain on goals of sustainable development. Examples include arbitrarily imposed economic sanctions such as the United States embargo against Cuba.

Typically, governments may argue that their ultimate or middle-term goals are served by a strengthening of multilateral schemes and institutions, as was many times the case during the period of the Concert of Europe.
