= First government of Artur Mas =

First Mas Government
- Executive Council of Catalonia
- 2010–2012
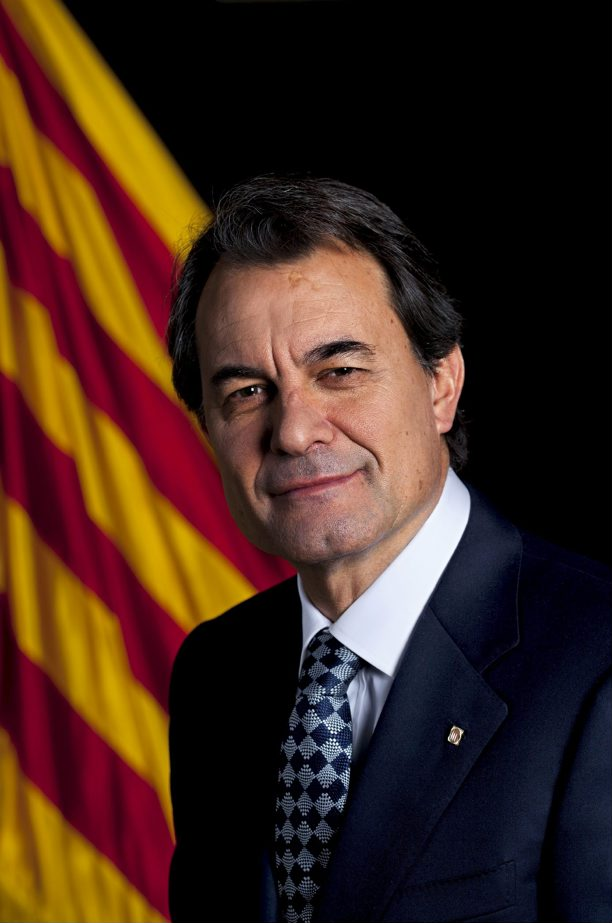
- Artur Mas
- Date formed: 27 December 2010
- Date dissolved: 27 December 2012

People and organisations
- Head of government: Artur Mas
- Deputy head of government: Joana Ortega
- Member party: Democratic Convergence of Catalonia; Democratic Union of Catalonia
- Status in legislature: Minority coalition government
- Opposition party: Socialists' Party of Catalonia
- Opposition leader: Joaquim Nadal

History
- Election: 2010 regional election
- Outgoing election: 2012 regional election
- Legislature term: IX Legislature (2010–2012)
- Budget: 2011, 2012
- Predecessor: Montilla
- Successor: Mas II

The First Mas Government was the regional government of Catalonia led by President Artur Mas between 2010 and 2012. It was formed in December 2010 following the regional election and ended in December 2012 following the regional election.

== Executive Council ==
| Name | Portrait | Party | Office | Took office | Left office | Refs |
|---|---|---|---|---|---|---|
| Artur Mas | | Democratic Convergence of Catalonia | President | 27 December 2010 | 27 December 2012 | |
| Joana Ortega | | Democratic Union of Catalonia | Vice President | 29 December 2010 | 27 December 2012 | |
| Joana Ortega | | Democratic Union of Catalonia | Minister of Governance and Institutional Relations | 29 December 2010 | 27 December 2012 | |
| Josep Lluís Cleries i Gonzàlez | | Democratic Convergence of Catalonia | Minister of Social Welfare and Family | 29 December 2010 | 27 December 2012 | |
| Pilar Fernández i Bozal | | Independent | Minister of Justice | 29 December 2010 | 27 December 2012 | |
| Germà Gordó i Aubarell | | Democratic Convergence of Catalonia | Secretary of the Government | 29 December 2010 | 27 December 2012 | |
| Francesc Homs Molist | | Democratic Convergence of Catalonia | Government Spokesperson | 29 December 2010 | 27 December 2012 | |
| Andreu Mas-Colell | | Independent | Minister of Economy and Knowledge | 29 December 2010 | 27 December 2012 | |
| Ferran Mascarell i Canalda | | Independent | Minister of Culture | 29 December 2010 | 27 December 2012 | |
| Francesc Xavier Mena i López | | Independent | Minister of Enterprise and Employment | 29 December 2010 | 27 December 2012 | |
| Josep Maria Pelegrí i Aixut | | Democratic Union of Catalonia | Minister of Agriculture, Livestock, Fisheries, Food and the Environment | 29 December 2010 | 27 December 2012 | |
| Felip Puig | | Democratic Convergence of Catalonia | Minister of Home Affairs (Note: Department d'Interior in Catalan; Home Affairs is the "official" translation according to the Generalitat. Public Safety perhaps better capture the "idea" of the department, but Interior Department is frequently used in the English-language media for similarly named agencies in other governments despite the fact that, for example, the U.S. Department of the Interior has a much different portfolio.) | 29 December 2010 | 27 December 2012 | |
| Lluís Recoder | | Democratic Convergence of Catalonia | Minister of Territory and Sustainability | 29 December 2010 | 27 December 2012 | |
| Irene Rigau | | Democratic Convergence of Catalonia | Minister of Education | 29 December 2010 | 27 December 2012 | |
| Boi Ruiz i Garcia | | Independent | Minister of Health | 29 December 2010 | 27 December 2012 | |
