= Second government of Artur Mas =

Regional government of Catalonia (2012–2016)

Second Mas Government
- Executive Council of Catalonia
- 2012–2016
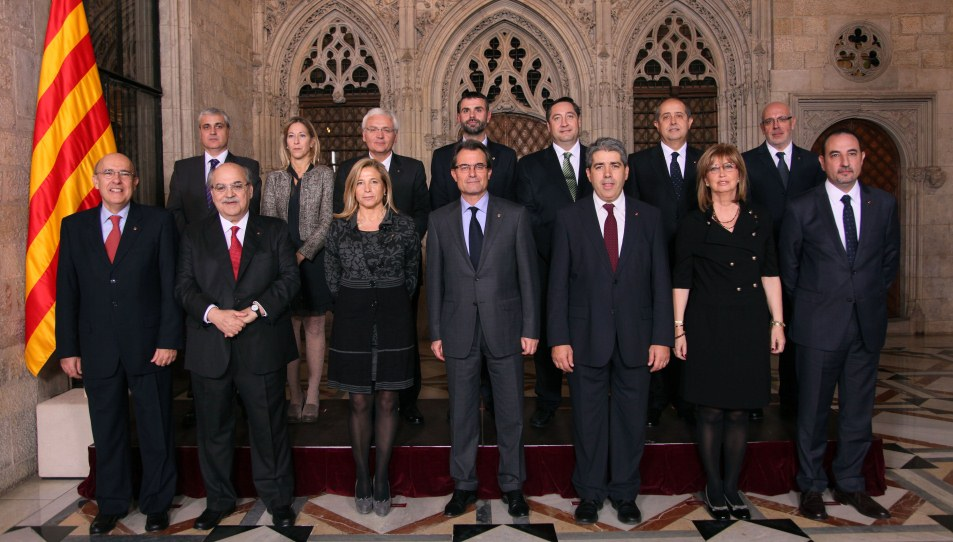
- The government in December 2012
- Date formed: 24 December 2012
- Date dissolved: 14 January 2016

People and organisations
- Head of government: Artur Mas
- Deputy head of government: Joana Ortega (until 22 June 2015); Neus Munté (from 22 June 2015)
- Member party: Democratic Convergence of Catalonia; Democratic Union of Catalonia
- Status in legislature: Minority coalition government
- Opposition party: Republican Left of Catalonia
- Opposition leader: Oriol Junqueras

History
- Election: 2012 regional election
- Outgoing election: 2015 regional election
- Legislature term: X Legislature (2012–2015)
- Budget: 2014, 2015
- Outgoing formation: 2015–16 Catalan government formation
- Predecessor: Mas I
- Successor: Puigdemont

The Second Mas Government was the regional government of Catalonia led by President Artur Mas between 2012 and 2016. It was formed in December 2012 following the regional election and ended in January 2016 following the Mas' resignation.

== History ==
The second Mas's cabinet made up the government of Catalonia from 24 December 2012 to 12 January 2016, a total of 1,114 days, or 3 years and 21 days. It was composed mainly by members of Democratic Convergence of Catalonia, Democratic Union of Catalonia (which left the government on 22 June 2015), and some independents, all integrated inside the alliance Convergence and Union.

=== Investiture ===
Investiture of Artur Mas (CDC)	Yes		No		Abstentions
21 December 2012 (1st ballot) (68/135 required)	71	• CiU (50) • ERC (21)	63	• PSC (20) • PP (18) • ICV–EUiA (13) • C's (9) • CUP (3)	0
Source: historiaelectoral.com

== Executive Council ==
The Executive Council was structured into 12 conselleries—not including the post of the President—as well as one Vice President office and one Secretary office.

Name	Portrait	Party	Office	Took office	Left office	Refs
Artur Mas		Democratic Convergence of Catalonia	President	24 December 2012	14 January 2016	
Joana Ortega		Democratic Union of Catalonia	Vice President	27 December 2012	22 June 2015	
Joana Ortega		Democratic Union of Catalonia	Minister of Governance and Institutional Relations	27 December 2012	22 June 2015	
Neus Munté		Democratic Convergence of Catalonia	Vice President	22 June 2015	14 January 2016	
Neus Munté		Democratic Convergence of Catalonia	Minister of Social Welfare and Family	27 December 2012	14 January 2016	
Neus Munté		Democratic Convergence of Catalonia	Spokesperson of the Government	22 June 2015	14 January 2016	
Jordi Baiget i Cantons		Democratic Convergence of Catalonia	Secretary of the Government	27 December 2012	14 January 2016	
Meritxell Borràs		Democratic Convergence of Catalonia	Minister of Governance and Institutional Relations	22 June 2015	14 January 2016	
Jordi Ciuraneta		Democratic Convergence of Catalonia	Minister of Agriculture, Livestock, Fisheries, Food and the Environment	22 June 2015	14 January 2016	
Ramon Espadaler Parcerisas		Democratic Union of Catalonia	Minister of Home Affairs	27 December 2012	22 June 2015	
Germà Gordó i Aubarell		Democratic Convergence of Catalonia	Minister of Justice	27 December 2012	14 January 2016	
Francesc Homs Molist		Democratic Convergence of Catalonia	Minister of Presidency (Note: The Office of the Minister of Presidency was assumed by the President of the Generalitat from 16 November 2015.)	27 December 2012	16 November 2015	
Francesc Homs Molist		Democratic Convergence of Catalonia	Spokesperson of the Government	27 December 2012	22 June 2015	
Jordi Jané i Guasch		Democratic Convergence of Catalonia	Minister of Home Affairs	22 June 2015	14 January 2016	
Andreu Mas-Colell		Democratic Convergence of Catalonia	Minister of Economy and Knowledge	27 December 2012	14 January 2016	
Ferran Mascarell i Canalda		Independent	Minister of Culture	27 December 2012	14 January 2016	
Josep Maria Pelegrí i Aixut		Democratic Union of Catalonia	Minister of Agriculture, Livestock, Fisheries, Food and the Environment	27 December 2012	22 June 2015	
Felip Puig		Democratic Convergence of Catalonia	Minister of Enterprise and Employment	27 December 2012	14 January 2016	
Irene Rigau		Democratic Convergence of Catalonia	Minister of Education	27 December 2012	14 January 2016	
Boi Ruiz i Garcia		Independent	Minister of Health	27 December 2012	14 January 2016	
Santi Vila		Democratic Convergence of Catalonia	Minister of Territory and Sustainability	27 December 2012	14 January 2016	
