= Polònia =

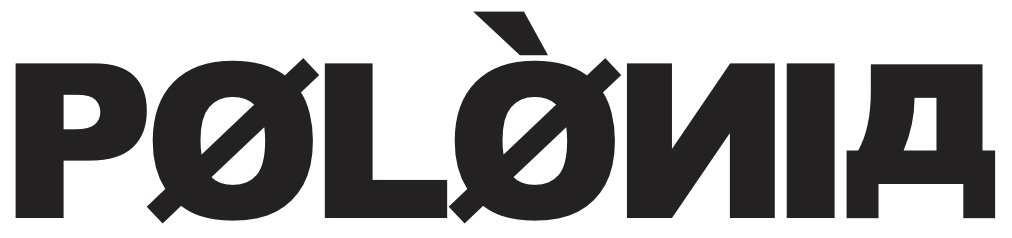
- Genre: Comedy
- Presented by: Toni Soler i Guasch
- Starring: Queco Novell; Cesc Casanovas; Bruno Oro; Manel Lucas; Xavier Noms; Xavier Serrano; Pau Miró; Gemma Deusedes; Lulú Palomares; Toni Albà; David Olivares; Sergi Mas; Agnès Busquets; Carlos Latre; Mireia Portas; Roger de Gràcia; Miquel Àngel Ripeu; Judit Martín
- Composer: Albert Alay
- Country of origin: Spain
- Original language: Catalan (with Spanish in some scenes)
- No. of seasons: 21
- No. of episodes: 808

Production
- Executive producers: Carles Gené (2006-09); David Felani (2009-present)
- Production locations: Barcelona, Catalonia
- Running time: approx. 30 minutes
- Production companies: Veranda TV (2006-09); Cancuca (2006-09); Minòria absoluta (2009-present); Televisió de Catalunya

Original release
- Network: TV3
- Release: February 16, 2006 – present

Related
- Minoria absoluta; Crackòvia

Polònia (English: Poland; stylized on screen as PØLØ̀ИIД) is a popular comedy TV show broadcast in Catalonia by the public broadcaster TV3.

It has more than a million viewers and is one of the most watched TV shows in Catalonia. It is hosted by Toni Soler who conducted other successful Catalan programmes such as Malalts de tele or Set de nit. It won the 2007 Ondas award.

The name of the programme comes from the common derogatory slur in the Spanish language polaco (literally "Pole" or "Polish") referring to the Catalan people or the Catalan language.

== History ==
Polònia was derived from a radio programme called Minoria absoluta (English: Absolute Minority), broadcast on the Catalan radio station RAC 1 from 2000 to 2009. Between 2004 and 2005 a television version of Minoria absoluta was shown on 8tv, and later in 2005 on Antena 3. Soon after, TV3 pitched Toni Soler to host the future Polònia based on the Antena 3 version of Minoria absoluta but with a Catalan setting. Polònia launched on 16 February 2006 with great success, making it among the most watched TV programmes in Catalonia. A total of 140 episodes were shown from 2006 until 11 June 2009 with special episodes in between and after; the latest special episode was broadcast on January 3, 2013.

== Content ==
Most of the programme consists of sketches with impersonation of celebrities, and they often interact with Toni Soler after recording those gags. Mainly it collects humour and satire from Spanish and especially Catalan politics. However, a few other famous people that are not related to politics also appear. Singers such as Lluís Llach, chefs such Ferran Adrià, Joan Laporta, the president of FC Barcelona (though these were removed a while ago for the new show "Crackòvia"), the former caudillo Francisco Franco and even the pope Benedict XVI are regularly shown. It also makes fun of many other TV3 journalists like Josep Cuní, Pilar Rahola, Ramon Pellicer and the TV3 director Mònica Terribas.

== Some impersonated characters ==
- Santiago Abascal
- Ángel Acebes
- Ferran Adrià
- Esperanza Aguirre
- Mahmud Ahmadinejad
- Woody Allen
- Pedro Almodóvar
- Magdalena Álvarez
- Martí Anglada
- Pere Aragonès
- Elsa Artadi
- Inés Arrimadas
- José María Aznar
- Antonio Baños
- Rita Barberà
- Meritxell Batet
- Pope Benedict XVI
- Albert Boadella
- José Bono
- Josep Borrell
- Cristina de Borbón
- Elena de Borbón
- Alfred Bosch
- Josep Bou
- Carla Bruni
- Miquel Buch
- Josep Lluís Carod-Rovira
- Miquel Calçada
- Dolors Camats
- David Cameron
- Francisco Camps
- Jordi Cañas
- Manuela Carmena
- Carlos Carrizosa
- Pablo Casado
- Muriel Casals
- Antoni Castells
- Fidel Castro
- Carme Chacón
- Hugo Chávez
- Cristina Cifuentes
- Bill Clinton
- Hillary Clinton
- Joan Clos
- Ada Colau
- Lluís Companys
- Toni Comín
- Celestino Corbacho
- Joan Coscubiela
- María Dolores de Cospedal
- Toni Cruanyes
- Josep Cuní
- Alfonso Dastis
- Susana Díaz
- Rosa Díez
- Xavier Domènech
- Josep Antoni Duran i Lleida
- Ramon Espadaler
- Íñigo Errejón
- King Felipe VI of Spain
- María Teresa Fernández de la Vega
- Jorge Fernández Díaz
- David Fernàndez
- Marta Ferrusola
- Carme Forcadell
- Teresa Forcades
- Pope Francis
- Francisco Franco
- Anna Gabriel
- Xavier García Albiol
- Antonio García Ferreras
- Helena García Melero
- José Manuel García-Margallo
- Baltasar Garzón
- Marina Geli
- Carlos Girauta
- Núria de Gispert
- Pere Gimferrer
- God himself, impersonated with Argentinian accent
- Felipe González
- Susanna Griso
- Pep Guardiola
- Luis de Guindos
- Jordi Hereu
- Joan Herrera
- Adolf Hitler
- François Hollande
- Francesc Homs
- Miquel Iceta
- Pablo Iglesias
- Juan José Ibarretxe
- Jordi Jané
- King Juan Carlos I of Spain
- Jean-Claude Juncker
- Oriol Junqueras
- Joan Laporta
- Kim Jong-un
- Queen Letizia of Spain
- Lluís Llach
- Pablo Llarena
- Federico Jiménez Losantos
- Ernest Maragall
- Pasqual Maragall
- Manuel Marchena
- Francisco Marhuenda
- Artur Mas
- Ferran Mascarrell
- Andreu Mas-Colell
- Theresa May
- Imma Mayol i Beltran
- Francesc Macià
- Emmanuel Macron
- Íñigo Méndez de Vigo
- Angela Merkel
- Fèlix Millet
- Enric Millo
- Juan Carlos Monedero
- Ferran Monegal
- Tomàs Molina i Bosch
- José Montilla
- Cristóbal Montoro
- Dolors Montserrat
- Quim Monzó
- Neus Munté
- Joaquim Nadal
- Pere Navarro
- Barack Obama
- Michelle Obama
- Albert Om
- Joana Ortega
- Javier Ortega Smith
- Bertín Osborne
- Arnaldo Otegi
- Marta Pascal
- Ramon Pellicer
- Alfredo Pérez Rubalcaba
- Josep Piqué
- Gerardo Pisarello
- Matías Prats
- Felip Puig
- Joan Puigcercós
- Carles Puigdemont
- Oriol Pujol i Ferrusola
- Jordi Pujol
- Jordi Pujol i Ferrusola
- Eduard Punset
- Vladimir Putin
- Lluís Rabell
- Pilar Rahola
- Mariano Rajoy
- Pedro J. Ramírez
- Eulàlia Reguant
- Carles Riera
- Irene Rigau
- Albert Rivera
- José Luis Rodríguez Zapatero
- Raül Romeva
- Àngel Ros
- Marta Rovira
- Gabriel Rufián
- Boi Ruiz
- Alberto Ruiz-Gallardon
- Josep Rull
- Carme Ruscalleda
- Soraya Sáenz de Santamaría
- Xavier Sala-i-Martin
- Elena Salgado
- Pedro Sánchez
- Alicia Sánchez-Camacho
- Raquel Sans
- Santi Santamaria
- Nicolas Sarkozy
- Joan Saura
- Joan Manuel Serrat
- Daniel Sirera
- Queen Sofía of Spain
- Pedro Solbes
- Toni Soler as himself, the director of the TV show
- Joan Tardà
- Mònica Terribas
- Quim Torra
- Roger Torrent
- Xavier Trias
- Donald Trump
- Montserrat Tura
- Iñaki Urdangarín
- Iñigo Urkullu
- Manuel Valls
- Josep Maria Vila d'Abadal
- José Manuel Villegas
- José Ignacio Wert
- Eduardo Zaplana
- Juan Ignacio Zoido
