= Feliu-Joan Guillaumes =

Spanish politician (1962–2024)

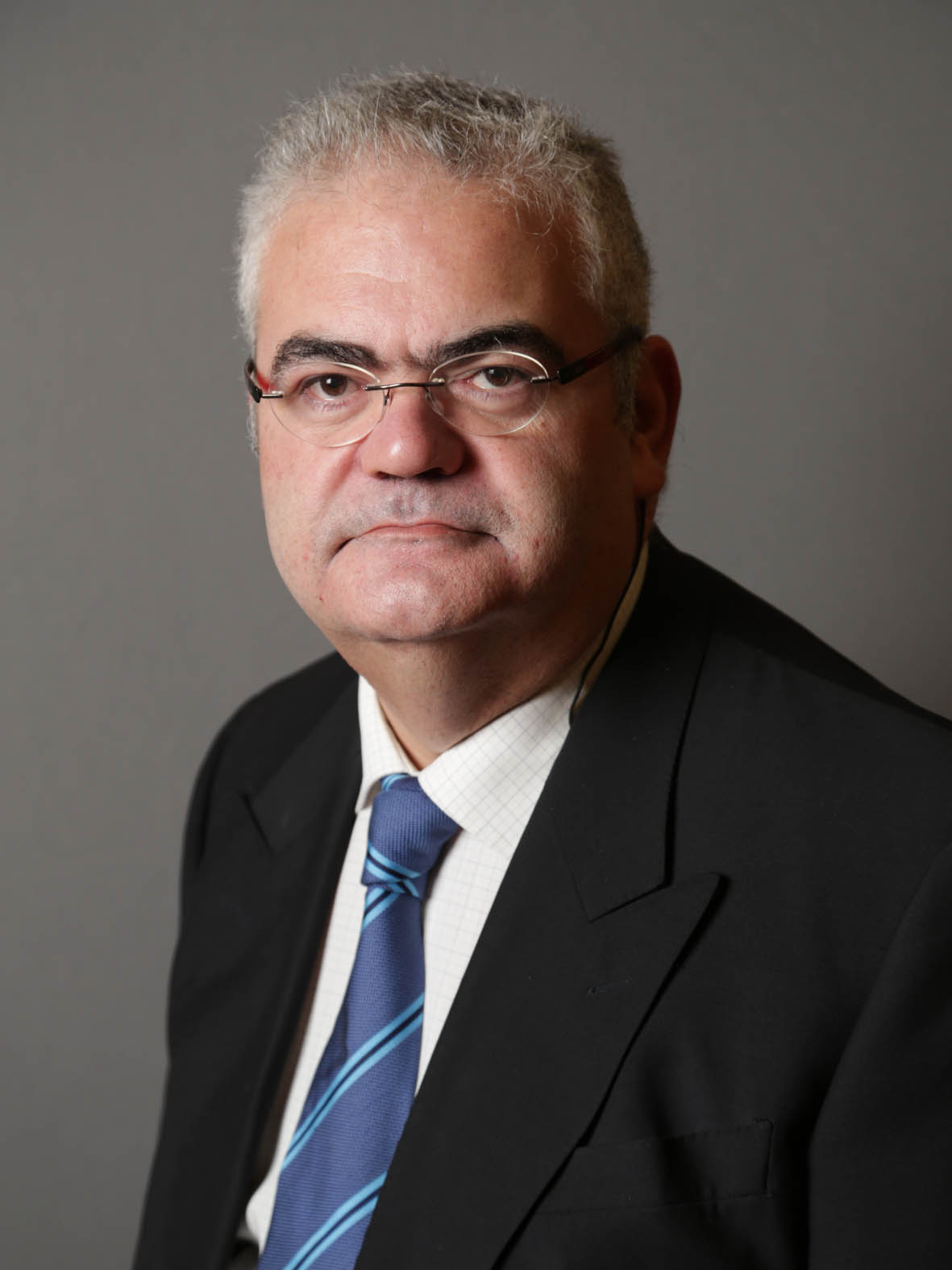
- Guillaumes in 2015

Congress of Deputies of Spain
- In office 5 April 2017 – 5 March 2019
- Preceded by: Francesc Homs i Molist
- Constituency: Barcelona
- In office 7 December 2011 – 27 October 2015
- Constituency: Barcelona
- In office 12 December 1995 – 9 January 1996
- Preceded by: Rafael Hinojosa i Lucena
- Constituency: Barcelona

Mollet del Vallès Municipal Council
- In office 1999–2013
- Succeeded by: Carme Segú i Pascua

Personal details
- Born: Feliu-Joan Guillaumes i Ràfols; 5 December 1962 Camprodon, Catalonia, Spain
- Died: 30 September 2024 (aged 61)
- Citizenship: Spanish
- Party: PDeCAT

Feliu-Joan Guillaumes i Ràfols (5 December 1962 – 30 September 2024) was a Spanish politician from Catalonia who was a member of the Congress of Deputies of Spain.

== Early life ==
Guillaumes was born on 5 December 1962 in Camprodon, Catalonia. He has lived in Mollet del Vallès since he was 7 years old. He has a degree in philosophy and letters and a Master of Arts degree in senior management from the Generalitat de Catalunya.

Guillaumes joined the Democratic Convergence of Catalonia (CDC) in 1978 and was a member of its national executive committee from 1988 to 1996. He was one of the founders of the Nationalist Youth of Catalonia (JNC) of which he was president from 1991 to 1994. He was also one of the founders of the National Federation of Students of Catalonia (Federació Nacional d'Estudiants de Catalunya).

== Career ==
Guillaumes was civil servant at the Generalitat de Catalunya and a human resources director for Sant Cugat del Vallès Municipal Council.

At the 1993 general election Guillaumes was placed 13th on the Convergence and Union (CiU) electoral alliance's list of candidates in the Province of Barcelona but the alliance only managed to win 10 seats in the province and as a result he failed to get elected to the Congress of Deputies. However he was appointed to the Congress of Deputies in December 1995 following the resignation of Rafael Hinojosa i Lucena.

Guillaumes contested the 1999 local elections as a CiU candidate in Mollet del Vallès and was elected. He was re-elected at the 2003, 2007 and 2011 local elections.

At the 2008 general election Guillaumes was placed 2nd on the CiU's list of candidates in the Province of Barcelona but the alliance only managed to win one seat in the province and as a result he failed to get elected to the Senate of Spain. He contested the 2011 general election as a CiU candidate in the Province of Barcelona and was re-elected to the Congress of Deputies.

At the 2015 general election Guillaumes was placed 6th on the Democracy and Freedom (DiL) electoral alliance's list of candidates in the Province of Barcelona but the alliance only managed to win four seats in the province and as a result he failed to get re-elected to the Congress of Deputies.

At the 2016 general election Guillaumes was placed 5th on the CDC's list of candidates in the Province of Barcelona but the party only managed to win four seats in the province and as a result he failed to get re-elected to the Congress of Deputies. However he was appointed to the Congress of Deputies in April 2017 following the disqualification of Francesc Homs i Molist.

Guillaumes was a member of Òmnium Cultural, Plataforma per la Llengua and Amnesty International.

== Personal life and death ==
Guillaumes was married and had an adopted Chinese daughter. He died on 30 September 2024, at the age of 61.

== Electoral history ==
Electoral history of Feliu-Joan Guillaumes
Election	Constituency	Party	Alliance	No.	Result
1993 general	Province of Barcelona	Democratic Convergence of Catalonia	Convergence and Union	13	Not elected
1999 local	Mollet del Vallès	Democratic Convergence of Catalonia	Convergence and Union	2	Elected
2003 local	Mollet del Vallès	Democratic Convergence of Catalonia	Convergence and Union	1	Elected
2007 local	Mollet del Vallès	Democratic Convergence of Catalonia	Convergence and Union	1	Elected
2008 general	Province of Barcelona	Democratic Convergence of Catalonia	Convergence and Union	2	Not elected
2011 local	Mollet del Vallès	Democratic Convergence of Catalonia	Convergence and Union	1	Elected
2011 general	Province of Barcelona	Democratic Convergence of Catalonia	Convergence and Union	9	Elected
2015 general	Province of Barcelona	Democratic Convergence of Catalonia	Democracy and Freedom	6	Not elected
2016 general	Province of Barcelona	Democratic Convergence of Catalonia		5	Not elected
