= Pere Macias =

Catalan politician

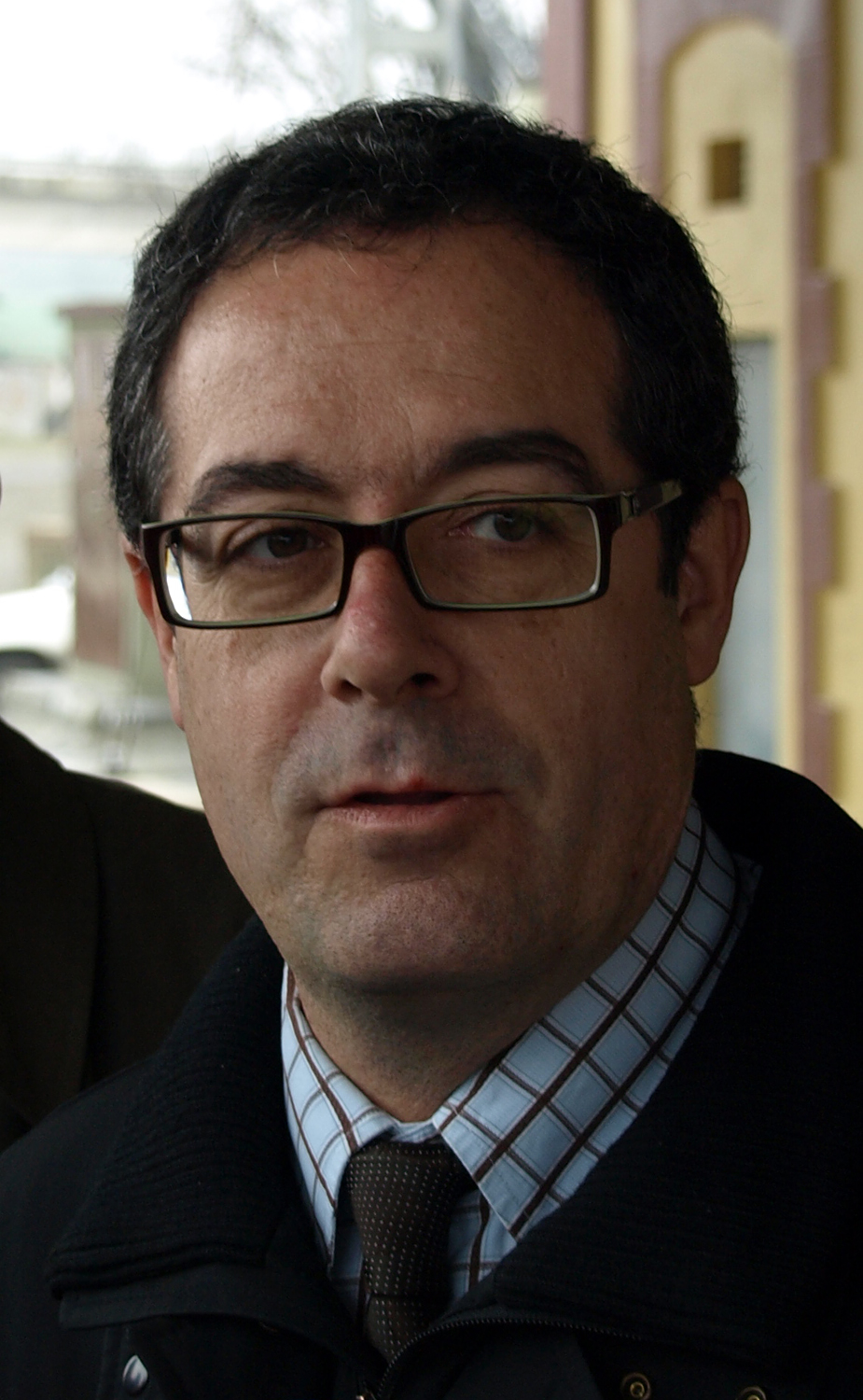
- Macias in 2008

Commissioner for the Integral Transfer of Rodalies
- Incumbent
- Assumed office 5 January 2024
- President: Pere Aragonès; Salvador Illa
- Minister: Ester Capella; Sílvia Paneque
- Preceded by: Office established

Minister of Territorial Policy and Public Works of Catalonia
- In office 30 July 1997 – 21 November 2001
- President: Jordi Pujol
- Preceded by: Artur Mas
- Succeeded by: Felip Puig

Minister of the Environment of Catalonia
- In office 7 June 1996 – 30 July 1997
- President: Jordi Pujol
- Preceded by: Albert Vilalta
- Succeeded by: Joan Ignasi Puigdollers

Member of the Parliament of Catalonia
- In office 5 December 1995 – 8 September 2006
- Constituency: Girona

Personal details
- Born: 14 June 1956 (age 70) Olot, Catalonia, Spain
- Citizenship: Spanish
- Party: CDC (1977–2016)
- Education: Polytechnic University of Catalonia

Pere Macias i Arau (born 14 June 1956) is a Catalan politician, former deputy to the Parliament of Catalonia and to the Parliament and senator.

== Biography ==
Pere Macias is an Engineer of Channels and Ports and teacher at the Polytechnical University of Catalonia. He is a member of Democratic Convergence of Catalonia since the 1977. He was mayor of Olot from March 1984 until June 1996. He was vice-president of the Deputation of Girona from 1987 until 1994 and president since the October of the 1994 until June 1996. From 1995 until July 1996 was president of the Catalan Association of Municipalities and Comarques.

In 1995, Macias was the head of list for the demarcation of Girona to the Elections to the Parliament of Catalonia, and was chosen deputy to the Parliament of Catalonia. He was appointed Councillor of Medium Ambient and House of the Generality of Catalonia, substituting for Albert Vilalta and González in the restructuring of the government that there was on 7 June 1996. He held this office until 30 July 1997, when he occupied the Council of Territorial Politics and Public Works substituting for Artur Mas. He held this office until 21 November 2001, when Felip Puig substituted.

In December 2001, he was appointed Secretary General Adjunct of the Federation of Convergence and Union and in January 2002 was appointed Secretary General Adjunct of Democratic Convergence of Catalonia. He was the Spokesperson of CiU to the Spanish Senate.

In the 2008 Spanish general elections, he was the number two of the candidature of Convergence and Union to the Congress of Deputies for Barcelona, last of Josep Antoni Duran and Lleida. He was chosen deputy again to the Spanish general elections of 2011.

On 14 October 2015 he announced that he left the political office to work for renewal to the party.

In April 2016, he was appointed technical director of the project for the connection of the two tramways of Barcelona (Trambaix and Trambesòs) within the municipal government of Ada Colau, given his expertise and as a former promoter of the reintroduction of the tramway to the city.

In September 2018, José Luis Ábalos, then Minister of Transport, Mobility and Urban Agenda under the government of Pedro Sánchez appointed him coordinator of the Rodalies de Catalunya Plan, under the purview of ADIF. During his tenure, the double-tracking of the R3 line was initiated, and the construction works of La Sagrera station and the new railway branch to the El Prat airport resumed.

In November 2023, the Government of Catalonia appointed him appointed Commissioner for the Transfer of Rodalies, the commuter and regional rail system of Catalonia currently under operation by the Spanish government, with the task of leading the integral transfer of the railway to the Catalan Government, i.e. rolling stock (currently owned by Renfe Operadora), workers and railway infrastructure (currently owned by ADIF), in compliance with the 2023 investiture agreement between the then ruling Republican Left of Catalonia and the Spanish Socialists' Workers Party. He officially took office on January 5, 2024. In August 2024, after the 2024 Catalan government formation, his appointment was ratified by the Government of Salvador Illa.
