= Marta Pascal =

Spanish politician

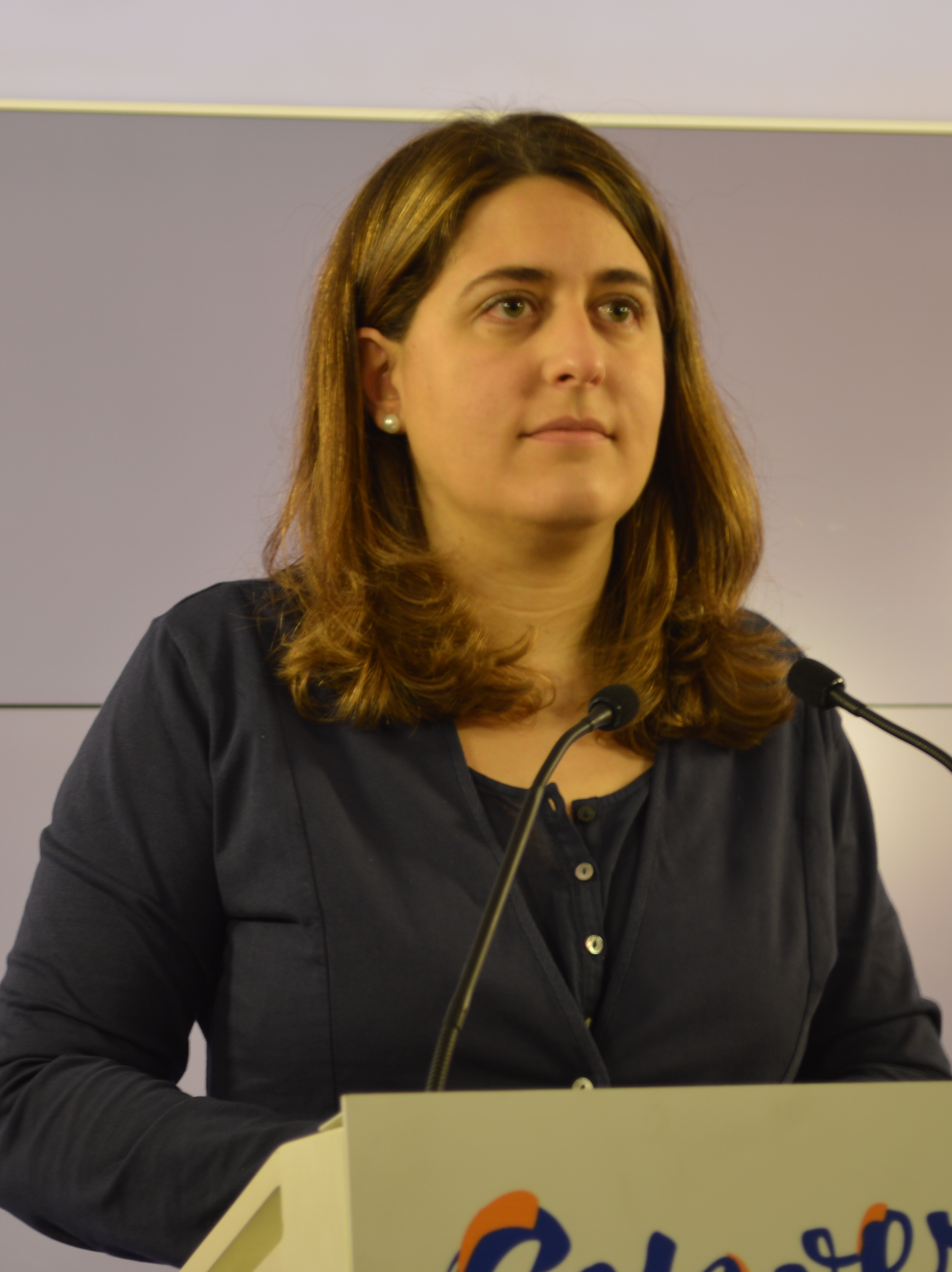
- Pascal in 2016
- Born: Marta Pascal Capdevila; 10 April 1983 (age 43); Vic, Catalonia, Spain
- Education: University of Barcelona
- Occupations: Historian, politician
- Organization: Òmnium Cultural
- Political party: CDC (2006–2016); PDeCAT (2016–2020)
- Spouse: Joaquim Bohils

Senator for the Parliament of Catalonia
- In office 3 May 2018 – 4 March 2020
- Constituency: Province of Barcelona

General coordinator of the Catalan European Democratic Party
- In office 23 July 2016 – 22 July 2018
- President: Artur Mas
- Vice President: Neus Munté

Deputy of the Parliament of Catalonia
- In office 16 December 2012 – 28 October 2017

President of the Nationalist Youth of Catalonia
- In office October 2012 – February 2015
- Preceded by: Gerard Figueras
- Succeeded by: Sergi Miquel Valentí

Marta Pascal Capdevila (born 10 April 1983) is a Spanish politician, a Senator of the Parliament of Catalonia. From July 2016 to July 2018, she was general coordinator of the Catalan European Democratic Party (PDeCAT). From October 2012 to February 2015, she was president of the Nationalist Youth of Catalonia, and from July 2015 until its dissolution in July 2016 she was the spokesperson for the Democratic Convergence of Catalonia (CDC).

== Biography ==
Marta Pascal earned licentiates in Political Science and Administration from Pompeu Fabra University and in History from the University of Barcelona.

She participated in the Ordit leadership program promoted by the Jaume Bofill Foundation. She completed a leadership program in public management (IESE-Madrid) and is currently participating in the leadership program Vicens Vives (ESADE).

Professionally, she has dedicated herself to the field of educational policies in the International Association of Educating Cities. From 2008 to 2011 she was head of the Department of Education area of the Vic City Council, and from 2011 to 2012 adviser to the Minister of Education of the Catalan government, Irene Rigau.

She is a member of Òmnium Cultural and a patron of the Eduard Soler Foundation-Escuela de Trabajo del Ripollés.

She regularly writes for various digital communication media, such as Nació Digital, Directe.cat, and e-notícies.

=== Political and institutional career ===
Pascal joined the Nationalist Youth of Catalonia (JNC) and the youth group of the Democratic Convergence of Catalonia (CDC). She joined the CDC in 2006.

She was president of the JNC from October 2012 to February 2015. From December 2010 to 2012 she was vice president. From November 2008 to April 2010 she shared responsibility for the JNC's Social Policies and Immigration area, and from April to December 2010 she was secretary of the territory.

She was part of the CDC executives of Vic and Osona, and of the Federation of Central Regions. Beginning in 2010 she was a member of the CDC's National Council.

In the 2012 elections, she was ranked 34th on the Convergence and Union (CiU) list and elected deputy. In the 2015 elections, she renewed her seat, this time on the Junts pel Sí list.

On 19 July 2015, she assumed the role of CDC spokesperson in the place of Mercè Conesa.

On 23 July 2016, she was elected General Coordinator of the Catalan European Democratic Party (PDeCAT), the inheritor party of the CDC. Pascal won in primaries with 87.76% of the votes over the rival candidacy led by the president of Reagrupament, Ignasi Planas, who received 12.27%.

On 3 May 2018 the Parliament of Catalonia appointed Pascal a Senator by Autonomic Designation.

=== Judicial case ===
On 22 December 2017, Judge Pablo Llarena of the Supreme Court of Spain agreed to the investigation (before imputation) for rebellion against Marta Pascal (PDeCAT general coordinator), Artur Mas (PDeCat president), Marta Rovira (ERC general secretary), Mireia Boya (CUP parliamentary group president), Anna Gabriel (CUP spokesperson), and Neus Lloveras (AMI president), all for belonging to the organizing team of the Catalan referendum of 1 October 2017 and with a decisive role in the Catalan independence plan, whose roadmap was annulled by the Constitutional Court of Spain.

=== Resignation as PDeCAT director ===
At the PDeCAT meeting held on 21 July 2018, Pascal resigned from its leadership, declaring that she did not enjoy the confidence of Carles Puigdemont. At this assembly, David Bonvehí was appointed president of the PDeCAT and it was agreed to join the coalition within the Crida Nacional per la República.
