= Lluís Recoder =

Spanish politician

Lluís Miquel Recoder i Miralles
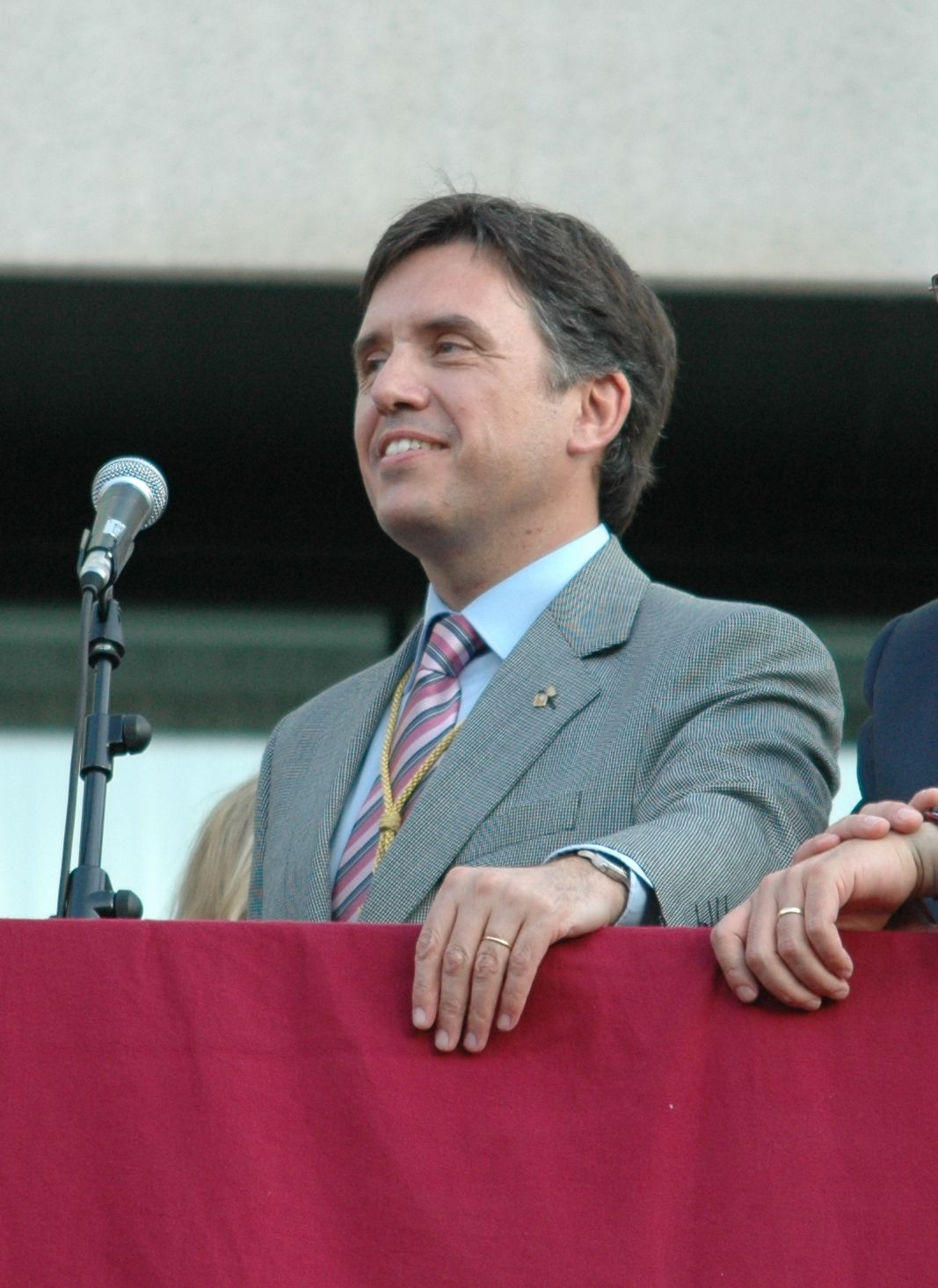

Minister of Planning and Sustainability of the Generalitat de Catalunya
- In office 29 December 2010 – 27 December 2012
- President: Artur Mas
- Preceded by: Joaquim Nadal (as Minister of Town and Country Town and Public Works); Francesc Baltasar i Albesa (as Minister of Environment and Housing)
- Succeeded by: Santi Vila i Vicente

Mayor of Sant Cugat del Vallès
- In office 1999 – 28 December 2010
- Preceded by: Joan Aymerich i Aroca
- Succeeded by: Mercè Conesa i Pagès

Personal details
- Born: 29 November 1958 (age 67) Barcelona, Barcelonès, Catalonia, Spain
- Party: Democratic Convergence of Catalonia
- Occupation: Lawyer

Lluís Miquel Recoder i Miralles (Barcelona, Spain 29 September 1958) is a Spanish politician. He was mayor of Sant Cugat del Vallès in Barcelona Province, Catalonia, Spain from 1999 to 2010 and held the office of Minister of Planning and Sustainability of the Generalitat de Catalunya from 29 December 2010 to 27 December 2012.

== Personal life ==
he holds a degree in law from the University of Barcelona, with a specialization in urban law and development.

== Career ==
As of 2013 he was an Advisory Partner at KPMG Spain. He is a member of Convergència Democràtica de Catalunya (CDC). He was a founder of the Joventut Nacionalista de Catalunya, or Nationalist Youth of Catalonia, the youth sector of the CDC, of which he was secretary and president from 1986 to 1991. In the Catalan elections of 1999 and 2003 he was elected diputat of the Catalan Parliament, but left to dedicate himself to municipal politics in 2006.

Recoder has described himself as a Catalan nationalist.

In early 2010, he proposed that the three largest political parties in Catalonia, Convergence and Union, Republican Left of Catalonia, and Socialists' Party of Catalonia, form a tripartite coalition to combat a possible overturn of the Statute of Autonomy of Catalonia by the Constitutional Court of Spain, indicating that such a coalition could be a "solution in a difficult time for Catalonia." As of May 18, 2010, the three, along with the Initiative for Catalonia Greens, agreed to collaborate with an aim to reforming the Constitutional Court of Spain.

Political offices
Preceded by Joaquim Nadal (as Minister of Town and Country Town and Public Works)	Minister of Planning and Sustainability of the Generalitat de Catalunya; 2010–2012	Succeeded by Santi Vila i Vicente
Preceded by Joan Aymerich i Aroca	Mayor of Sant Cugat del Vallès; 1999–2010	Succeeded by Mercè Conesa i Pagès
