= Jaume Padrós i Selma =

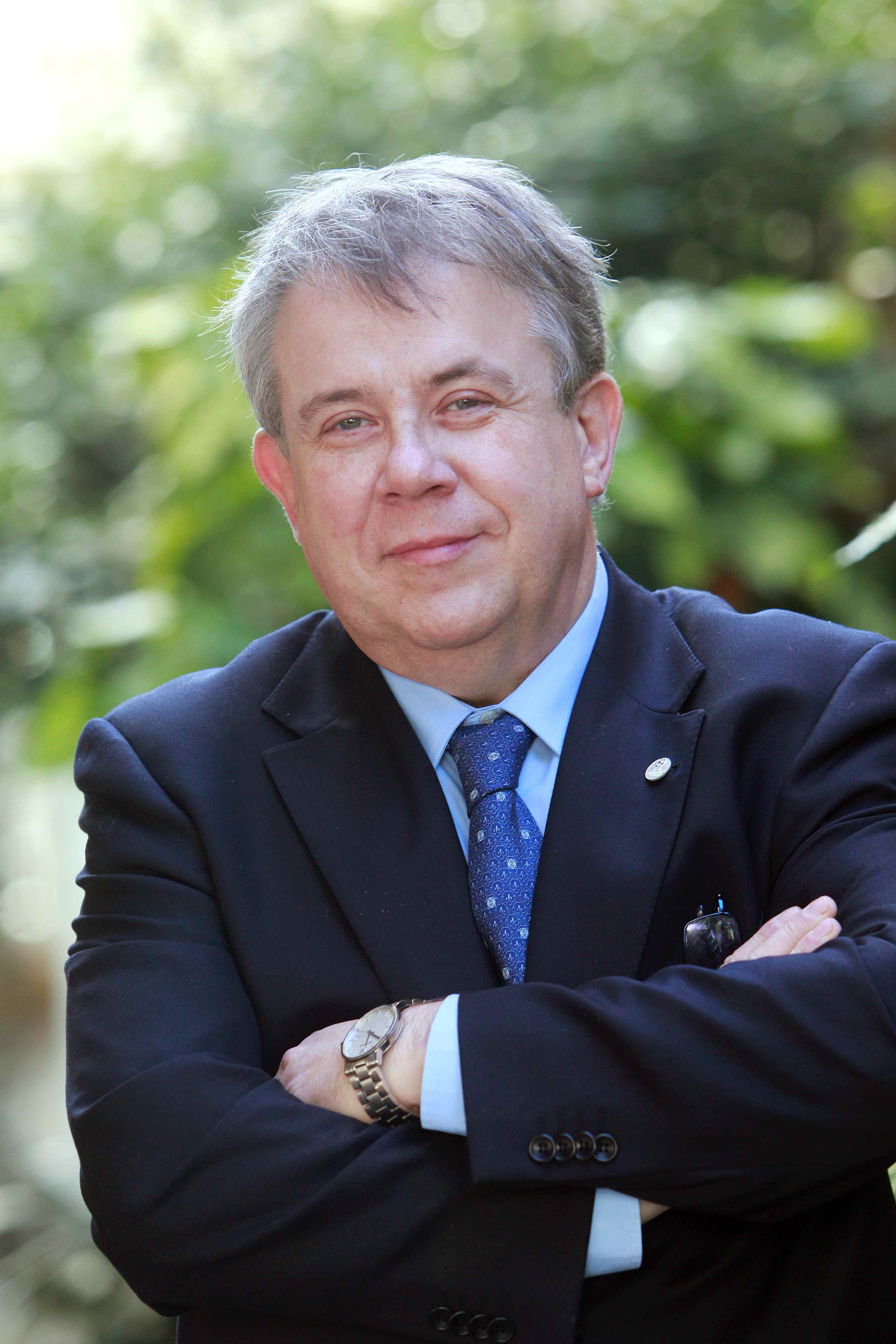
- In office 1989–1995

Jaume Padrós i Selma (Barcelona, Spain, 1959) is a Catalan physician and politician.

He studied medicine at the Faculty of Medicine of the University of Barcelona where he got his doctorate in medicine. He specialized in Family Medicine, Occupational Medicine, and he got a Master's Degree in Gerontology. He was one of the founders of the Joventut Nacionalista de Catalunya-JNC * (Youth branch of Convergència Democràtica de Catalunya political party) and of the Federació Nacional d’Estudiants de Catalunya (National Student Federation of Catalonia - FNEC). He was also a member of the Parliament of Catalonia (1989–1995) where he advocated, among many issues, for the Llei d'Ordenació Sanitaria de Catalunya (Healthcare Standards Law of Catalonia) and for the creation of the Instituto Catalan del Voluntariado (Catalan Volunteer Institute), He was also Co-Founder of the first Food Bank of Spain and he was the key driver of the Programa de la Renda Mínima de Inserción (Minimum Wage Insertion Program) of the Generalitat of Catalonia.

Today he is President of the Col·legi Official de Metges de Barcelona (Official Barcelona Medical Association – COMB) since 2014, where he had also been its Vice-President and Secretary. Apart from his professional activities as a physician, he is also known for his dedication to programs related to the health of doctors and healthcare professionals through the Fundació Galatea (Galatea Foundation), which he founded and preceded as president and the Programa d'Atenció Integral al Metge Malalt (The Caring Program for Sick Physicians - PAIMM). He is also a founding member of the European Association for Physicians Health (EAPH). He has authored numerous works and articles related to his specializations.

The Government of the Generalitat of Catalonia awarded him the Trueta Medal for healthcare merit in 2016 and the Creu de Sant Jordi on April 11, 2017.
