= Sergi Miquel =

Spanish politician (born 1989)

Sergi Miquel MP
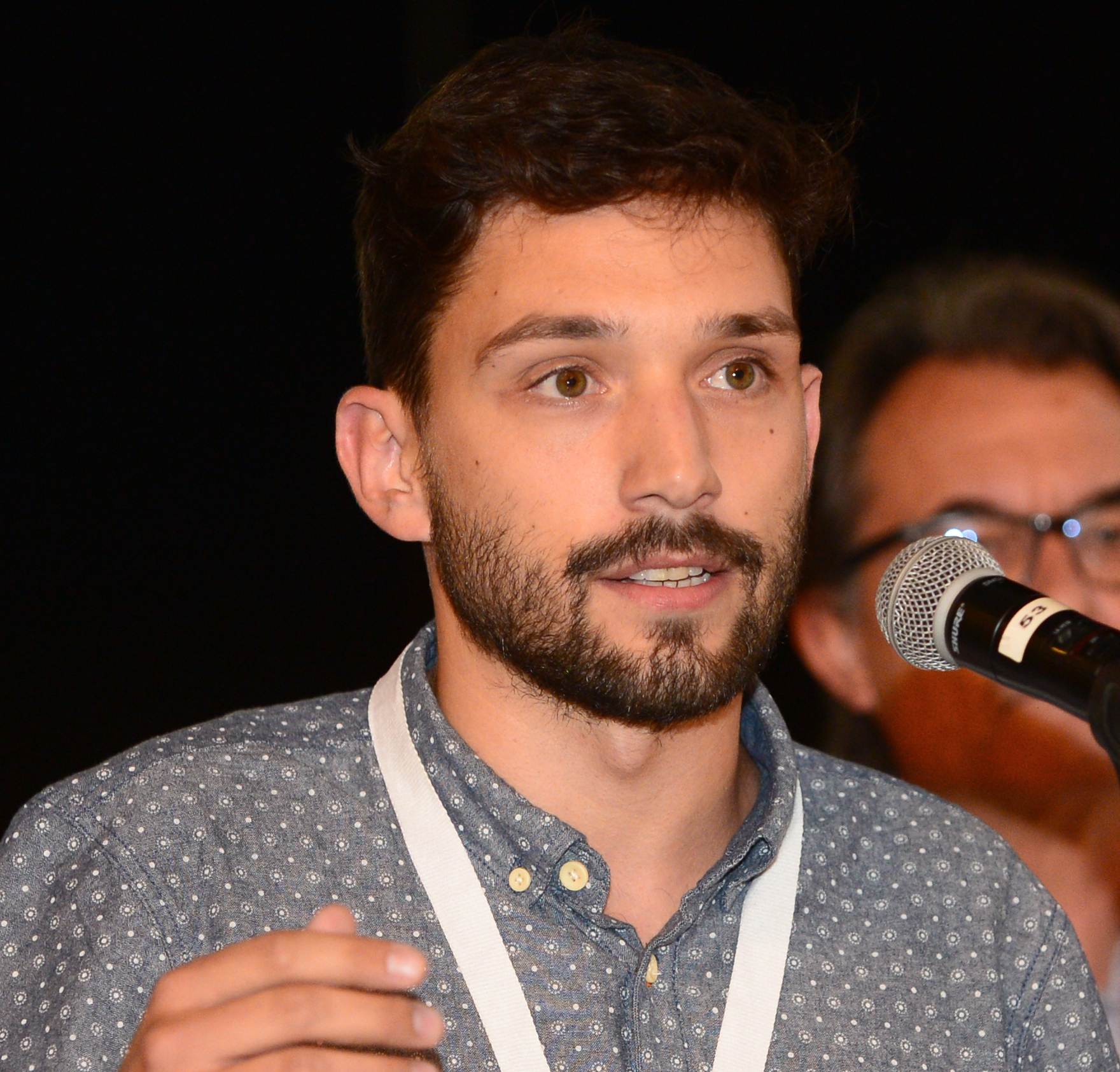
- Miquel in July 2016

Member of the Congress of Deputies
- In office 5 July 2016 – 30 May 2023
- Constituency: Girona

Member of Llagostera Municipal Council
- In office 2011–2016
- Succeeded by: Robert Montiel i Molina

Personal details
- Born: Sergi Miquel i Valentí; 24 December 1989 (age 36) Llagostera, Catalonia, Spain
- Citizenship: Spanish
- Party: Catalan European Democratic Party
- Other political affiliations: Together for Catalonia
- Education: University of Southampton; ELISAVA

Sergi Miquel i Valentí (born 24 December 1989) is a Spanish politician from Catalonia and former Member of the Congress of Deputies of Spain.

== Early life ==
Miquel was born on 24 December 1989 in Llagostera, Catalonia. He has a bachelor's degree in art and design from the University of Southampton and a degree in design from ELISAVA. He has been secretary-general of the Nationalist Youth of Catalonia (JNC) since 2015.

== Career ==
Miquel contested the 2011 local elections as a Convergence and Union (CiU) electoral alliance candidate in Llagostera and was elected. He was re-elected at the 2015 local elections. Miquel contested the 2016 general election as a Democratic Convergence of Catalonia (CDC) candidate in the Province of Girona and was elected to the Congress of Deputies. He was re-elected at the April 2019 general election as a Together for Catalonia (JxCat) candidate.

Miquel was president of the Papu Tisores Cultural Association and is a member of Òmnium Cultural and ESPLAC.

== Electoral history ==
Electoral history of Sergi Miquel
Election	Constituency	Party	Alliance	No.	Result
2011 local	Llagostera	Democratic Convergence of Catalonia	Convergence and Union	7	Elected
2015 local	Llagostera	Democratic Convergence of Catalonia	Convergence and Union	3	Elected
2016 general	Province of Girona	Democratic Convergence of Catalonia		2	Elected
2019 Apr general	Province of Girona	Catalan European Democratic Party	Together for Catalonia	2	Elected
