= Santi Vila =

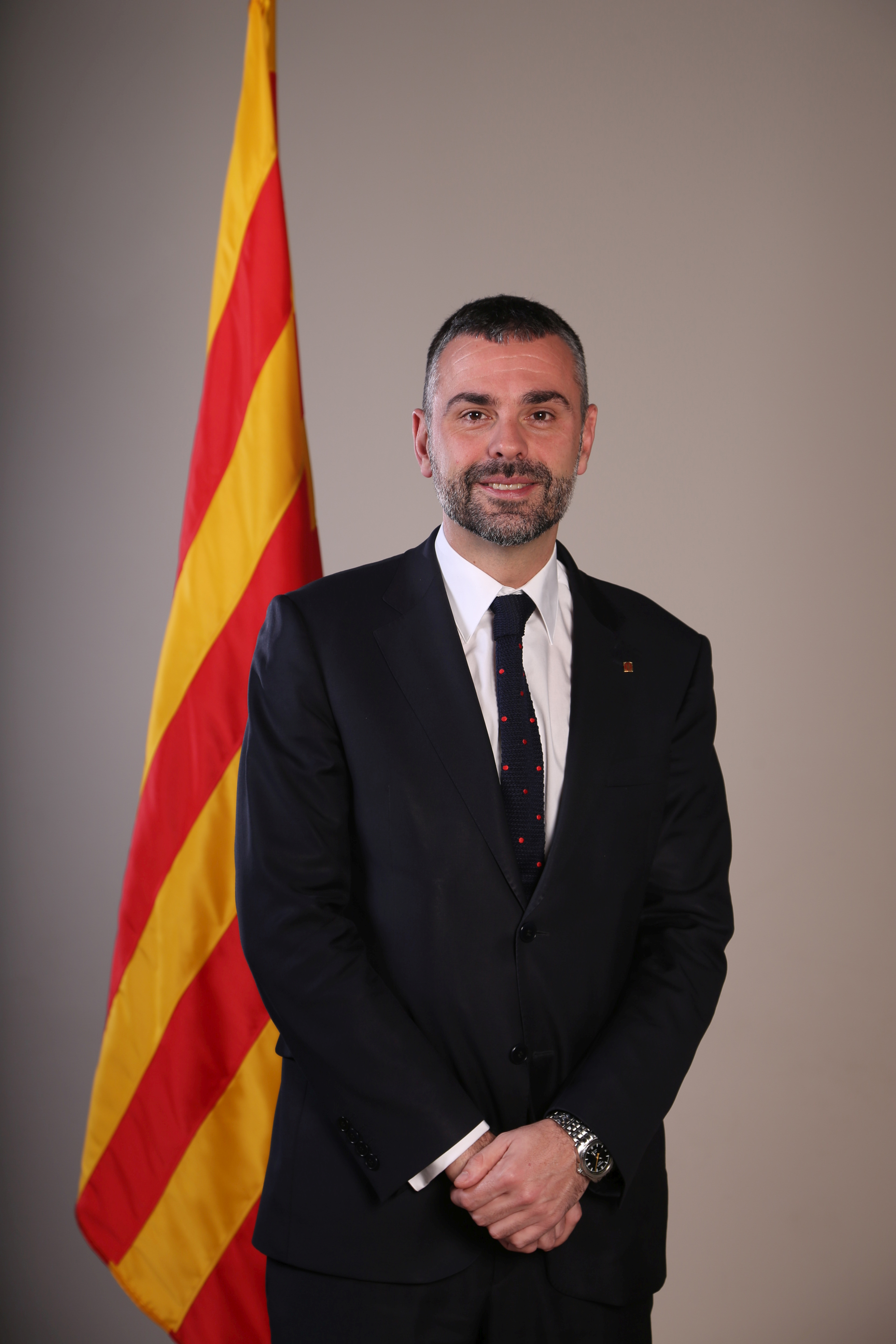
- Official portrait, 2016

Minister of Enterprise and Knowledge of Catalonia
- In office 3 July 2017 – 26 October 2017
- President: Carles Puigdemont
- Preceded by: Jordi Baiget
- Succeeded by: Josep Rull (acting) (Direct rule from 27 October 2017)

Minister of Culture of Catalonia
- In office 14 January 2016 – 5 July 2017
- President: Carles Puigdemont
- Preceded by: Ferran Mascarell
- Succeeded by: Lluís Puig

Minister of Territory and Sustainability of Catalonia
- In office 27 December 2012 – 14 January 2016
- President: Artur Mas
- Preceded by: Lluís Recoder
- Succeeded by: Josep Rull

Mayor of Figueres
- In office 2007–2012

Personal details
- Born: Santiago Vila i Vicente; 15 March 1973 (age 53) Granollers, Catalonia, Spain
- Party: Catalan European Democratic Party (2016–2018)
- Education: University of Girona; Autonomous University of Barcelona
- Occupation: Politician and historian

Santiago "Santi" Vila i Vicente (born 15 March 1973) is a Catalan historian and politician from Granollers, Spain. He was a member of the Catalan European Democratic Party, and was a councillor at Figueres from 1999 before becoming mayor from 2007 to 2012. Later he held several positions in the Executive Council of Catalonia.

On 2 November 2017 members of the Generalitat de Catalunya were arrested for sedition, unlike the others Vila was offered bail of €50,000 as he had resigned before the Catalan unilateral declaration of independence. He was pre-trial jailed just a night. The trial began on 12 February 2019 and was remitted to decision on 12 June 2019.

On 14 October 2019, Vila was sentenced to a year and 8 months of disqualification and a fine of €60.000 for disobedience.

== See also ==
- 2017–18 Spanish constitutional crisis
- Trial of Catalonia independence leaders
