= Pierre Vilar =

French historian

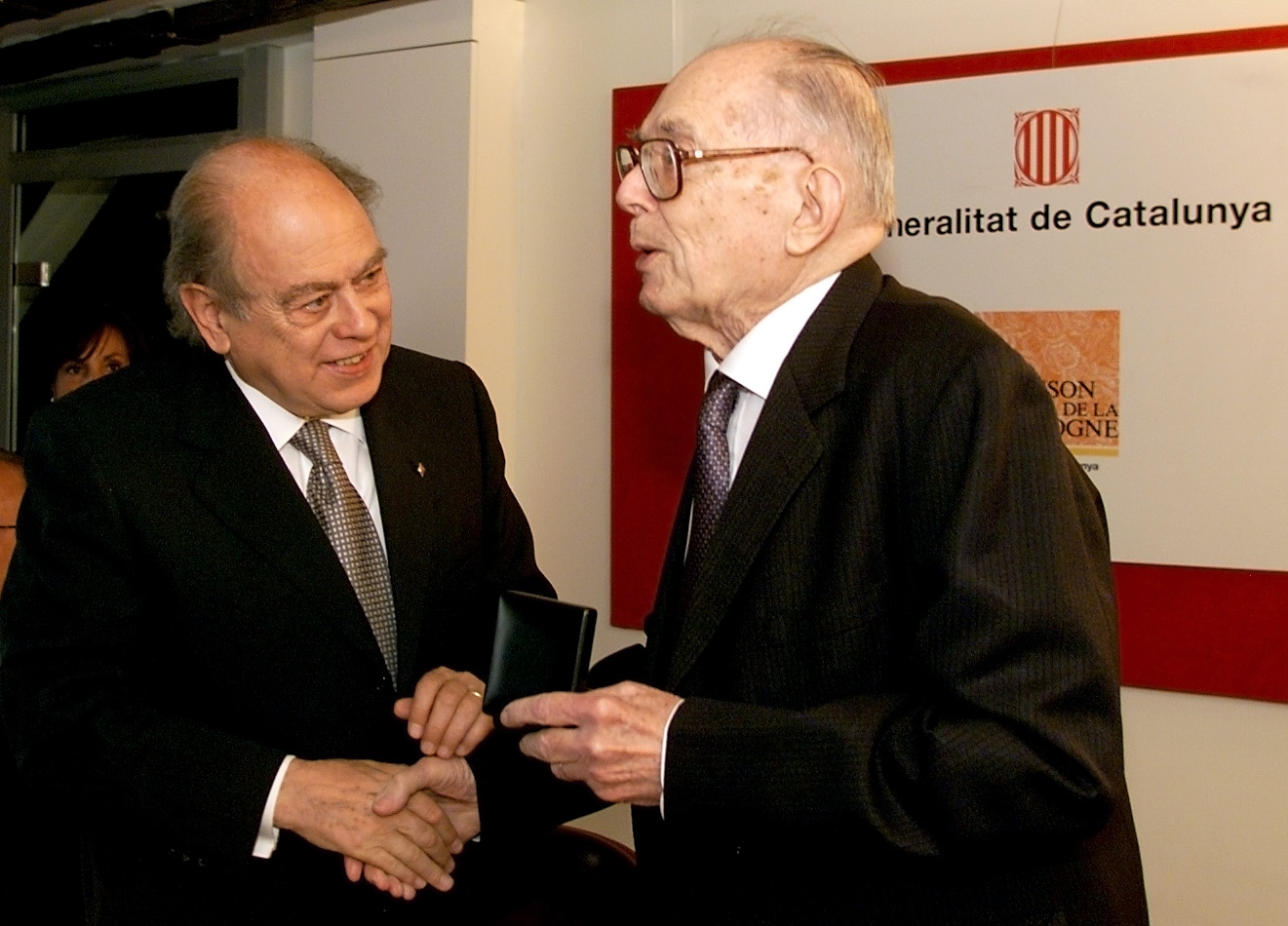

Pierre Vilar (3 May 1906, Frontignan – 7 August 2003, Saint-Palais) was a French historian specialized in the history of Catalonia and Hispanism. He is considered one of the most authoritative 20th-century historians for the history of Spain, for both the Ancien Régime and modern history. He and Jaume Vicens Vives were among the most influential historians of Catalonia.

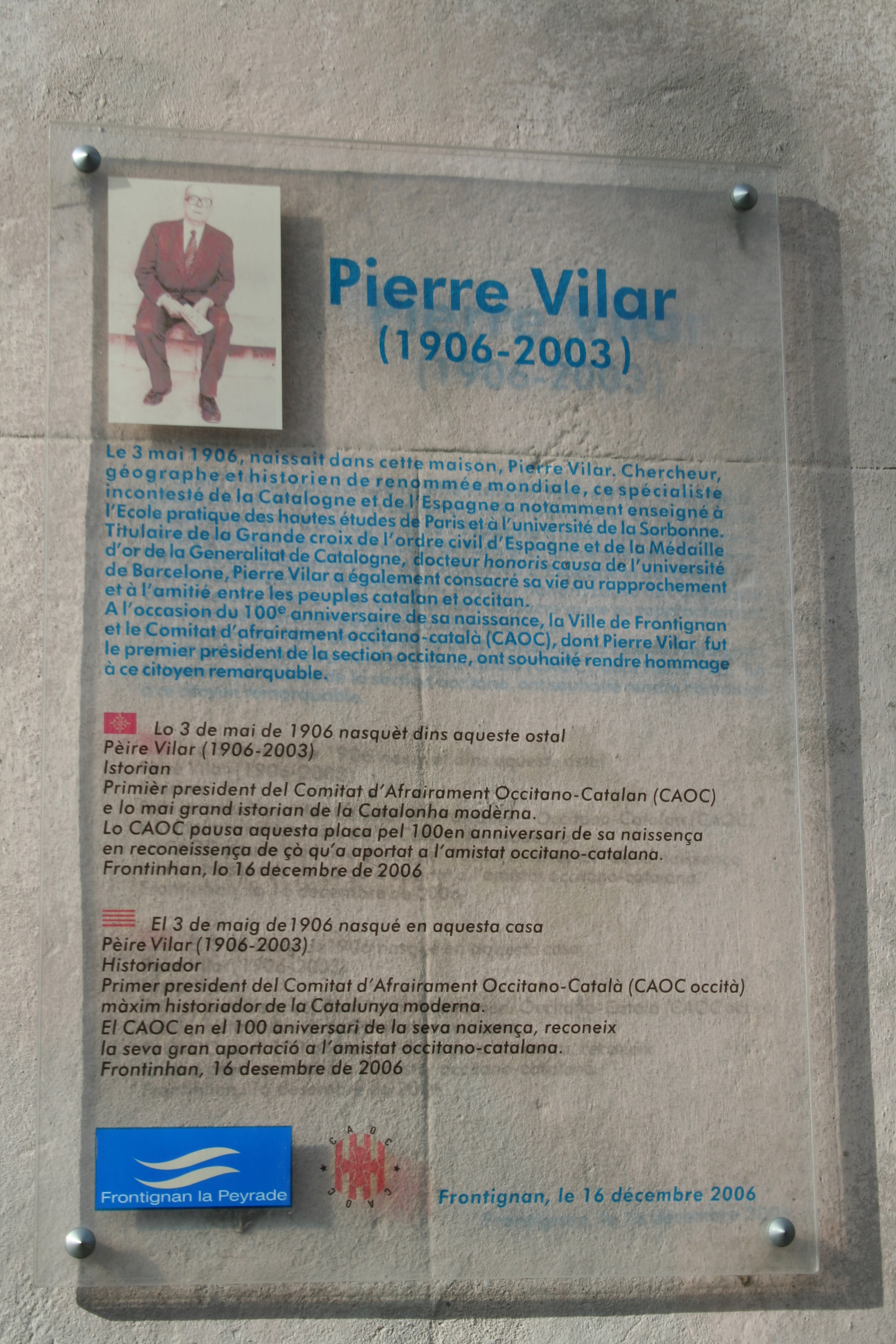
Pierre Vilar

His short 1947 essay Histoire de l'Espagne (History of Spain), despite being banned under Francoism, has a great success, and after the death of the Francisco Franco was frequently used in progressive circles and for teaching. In 2009, it reached its 22nd edition.

== Works ==
- 1947: Histoire de l'Espagne.
- 1959: Le déclin catalan du bas Moyen Âge. Hypothèses sur sa chronologie
- 1962: La Catalogne dans l'Espagne moderne. Recherches sur les fondements économiques des structures nationales
- 1965: Growth and development
- 1969: L’Or et la Monnaie dans l’histoire (1450–1920)
- 1973: Marxist History, a History in the Making: Towards a Dialogue with Althusser (New Left Review I, 80, pp. 65-106)
- 1975: Assaigs sobre la Catalunya del segle XVIII
- 1980: Introduction to the vocabulary of the historical analysis
- 1986: La guerre d'Espagne
- 1987–1990: Història de Catalunya
- 1995: Pensar històricament. Reflexions i records.
- 1998: History, nation and nationalism: a national question and labour movement.

== Pierre Vilar Collection ==
The Pierre Vilar Collection of the Universitat de Girona (UdG) is the personal library of the historian, given by his family in 2006. It consists of more than 6,500 20th and 19th century books and 331 journal series, with some of the volumes signed and dedicated by its authors. The collection is located at the UdG Library. Barri Vell campus.

Cataloguing of the collection was completed in 2006 in the context of the centennial of Pierre Vilar's birth.

This collection with those of Jaume Vicens Vives, Joan Reglà, Ramon Garrabou, Jordi Nadal, Joaquim Nadal i Lluís Maria de Puig, confer to the UdG a great significance as center for historical research in Catalunya.
