= List of ministers of territory and sustainability of Catalonia =

== List of ministers ==
=== Town and country town and public works (1977-2010) ===
| | Name | Took office | Left office | Party |
|---|---|---|---|---|
| 1 | Narcís Serra | December 5, 1977 | March 22, 1979 | PSC |
| 2 | Lluís Armet i Coma | March 22, 1979 | May 8, 1980 | PSC |
| 3 | Josep Maria Cullell i Nadal (1st time) | May 8, 1980 | June 14, 1983 | CDC |
| 4 | Xavier Bigatà i Ribé | June 14, 1983 | July 4, 1988 | CDC |
| 5 | Joaquim Molins i Amat | July 4, 1988 | April 29, 1993 | CDC |
| 6 | Josep Maria Cullell i Nadal (2nd time) | April 29, 1993 | November 18, 1994 | CDC |
| 7 | Jaume Roma i Rodríguez | November 18, 1994 | June 15, 1995 | CDC |
| 8 | Artur Mas | June 15, 1995 | July 30, 1997 | CDC |
| 9 | Pere Macias | July 30, 1997 | November 20, 2001 | CDC |
| 10 | Felip Puig | November 20, 2001 | December 17, 2003 | CDC |
| 11 | Joaquim Nadal | December 17, 2003 | December 29, 2010 | PSC |

=== Planning and sustainability (since 2010) ===
| | Name | Took office | Left office | Party |
|---|---|---|---|---|
| 12 | Lluís Recoder | December 29, 2010 | December 27, 2012 | CDC |
| 13 | Santi Vila i Vicente | December 27, 2012 | January 13, 2016 | CDC |
