= Nationalist Youth of Catalonia =

Nationalist Youth of Catalonia Joventut Nacionalista de Catalunya
- National Council Chair: Narcís Junqueras Cros
- Secretary General: Ariadna Urroz Segura
- Founded: 25 April 1980
- Headquarters: C/Puig-Reig 10 baixos, Barcelona
- Membership: 4,028 (june 2018)
- Ideology: Civic nationalism Catalan independence Pro-Europeanism; Liberalism; Progressivism; Ecologism; Feminism; Secularism
- Position: Centre-right
- Mother party: Democratic Convergence of Catalonia (1980–2016); Catalan European Democratic Party (2016–2020); Together for Catalonia (since 2020)
- Newspaper: Estel Blanc
- Website: www.jnc.cat

Nationalist Youth of Catalonia (Joventut Nacionalista de Catalunya, JNC) is the youth organisation of Together for Catalonia, founded in 1980 as the youth group of Democratic Convergence of Catalonia (CDC). Ariadna Urroz is the general secretary since March 2023. It is a full member organization of the European Liberal Youth and the International Federation of Liberal Youth.

== History ==
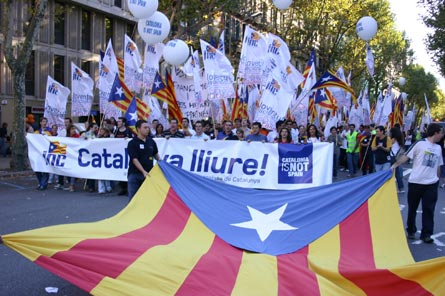
JNC demonstration in the National Day of Catalonia (2005).

JNC was founded in April 1980 in Platja d'Aro by young members of CDC, and refounded in 2016 as the PDeCAT. The organization gradually evolved to independentist positions, which also influenced the political orientation of CDC.

== Presidents and secretaries general ==
Anys	President	Secretary general	President of the National Council
1980–1982	No president	Ramon Camp i Batalla	Josep Soler i Casanellas
1982–1984	Ramon Camp i Batalla	Joan Oliveres i Bagués	No president
1984–1986	Raimon Gusi i Amigó	Enric Ticó i Buxadós	No president
1986–1988	Enric Ticó i Buxadós	Lluís Recoder i Miralles	No president
1988–1989	Lluís Recoder i Miralles	Jordi Martí i Galbis	Jaume Padrós i Selma
1989–1991	Lluís Recoder i Miralles	Carles Campuzano i Canadès	No president
1991–1992	Feliu Guillaumes i Ràfols	Carles Campuzano i Canadès	Jordi Vendrell i Ros
1992–1994	Feliu Guillaumes i Ràfols	Carles Campuzano i Canadès	No president
1994–1996	Carles Campuzano i Canadès	Josep Rull i Andreu	Antoni Biarnés i Mas
1996–1998	No president	Josep Rull i Andreu	Pere Saló i Manresa
1998–2000	No president	Jordi Xuclà i Costa	Daniel Clivillé i Morató
2000–2002	Jordi Xuclà i Costa	Albert Batalla i Siscart	Marc Guerrero i Tarragó
2002–2004	Esther Roca i Isart	Albert Batalla i Siscart	No president
2004–2006	Albert Batalla i Siscart	Jordi Cuminal i Roquet	No president
2006–2008	Marc Pifarré i Estrada	Jordi Cuminal i Roquet	No president
2008–2010	Gerard Figueras i Albà	No secretary general	Laura Costa
2010–2012	Gerard Figueras i Albà	No secretary general	Oriol Martín i Berbois
2012–2015	Marta Pascal i Capdevila	No secretary general	Ramon Morell i Sau
2015–2017	No president	Sergi Miquel Valentí	Pere Canal Oliveras
2017–2019	No president	Sergi Miquel Valentí	Judit Cabana Comas
2019–2021	No president	Judith Toronjo Nofuentes	Albert Pérez Garro
2021–2023	No president	Alvaro Clapés-Saganyoles Baena	Ariadna Urroz Segura
2023–2025	No president	Ariadna Urroz Segura	Narcís Junquera Cros
2025–2027	No president	Aleix Martí	Carlota Monfort
