= Fèlix Millet =

Spanish businessman (1935–2023)

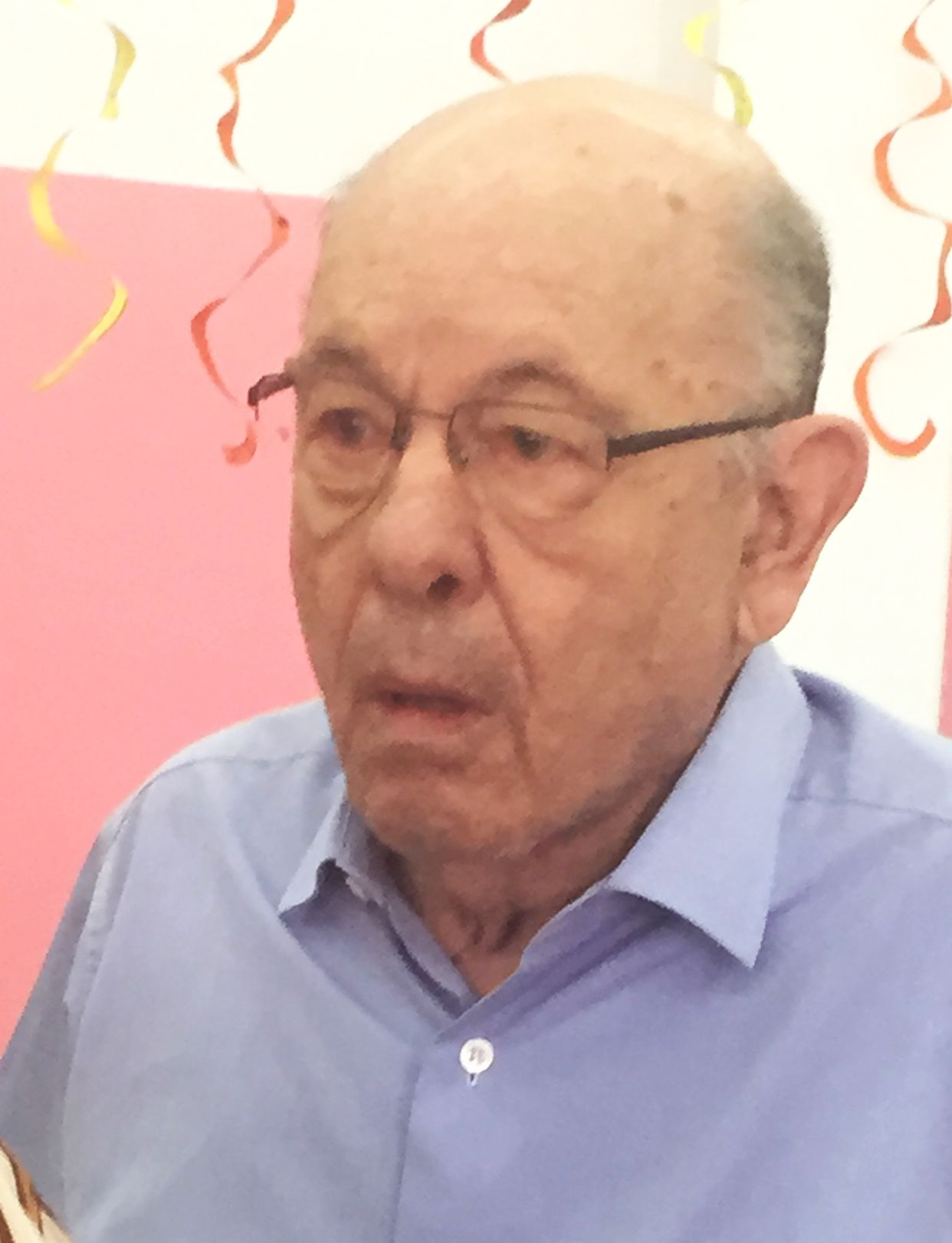
- Millet in 2015
- Born: 8 December 1935; Barcelona, Catalonia, Spain
- Died: 15 March 2023 (aged 87); Cardedeu, Catalonia, Spain
- Occupation: Businessman

Fèlix Millet i Tusell (8 December 1935 – 15 March 2023) was a Spanish businessman and convicted fraudster.

== Life, career and judicial case ==
Born in Barcelona, Millet was the nephew of Lluís Millet, the co-founder of the Orfeó Català. The fourth of five brothers, he studied agronomy and later spent ten years in Bioko, where he presided a coffee and cocoa exporting company belonging to his family.

Millet served as the president of the "Fundació Orfeó Català i del Palau de la Música Catalana" (Orfeó Català and Palau de la Música Catalana Foundation) from 1990 to 2009, when he was dismissed from his role because of a case of corruption and fraud. Among other things, he was accused of looting 23 million euros from public and private funds devoted to the cultural institution for personal use, and to have used the institution to cover corruption payments between other institutions, such as illegal commissions from Ferrovial to the Democratic Convergence of Catalonia.After a long trial, in which he partly admitted his wrongdoings, Millet was sentenced to 9 years and 8 months in prison for embezzlement, misappropriation, influence peddling, falsification of commercial documents and money laundering.

In November 2022, Millet was granted domiciliary detention for humanitarian reasons in a residence in Cardedeu. He died of a stroke on 15 March 2023, at the age of 87.
