= Francesc Homs Molist =

Spanish politician (born 1969)

Francesc Homs
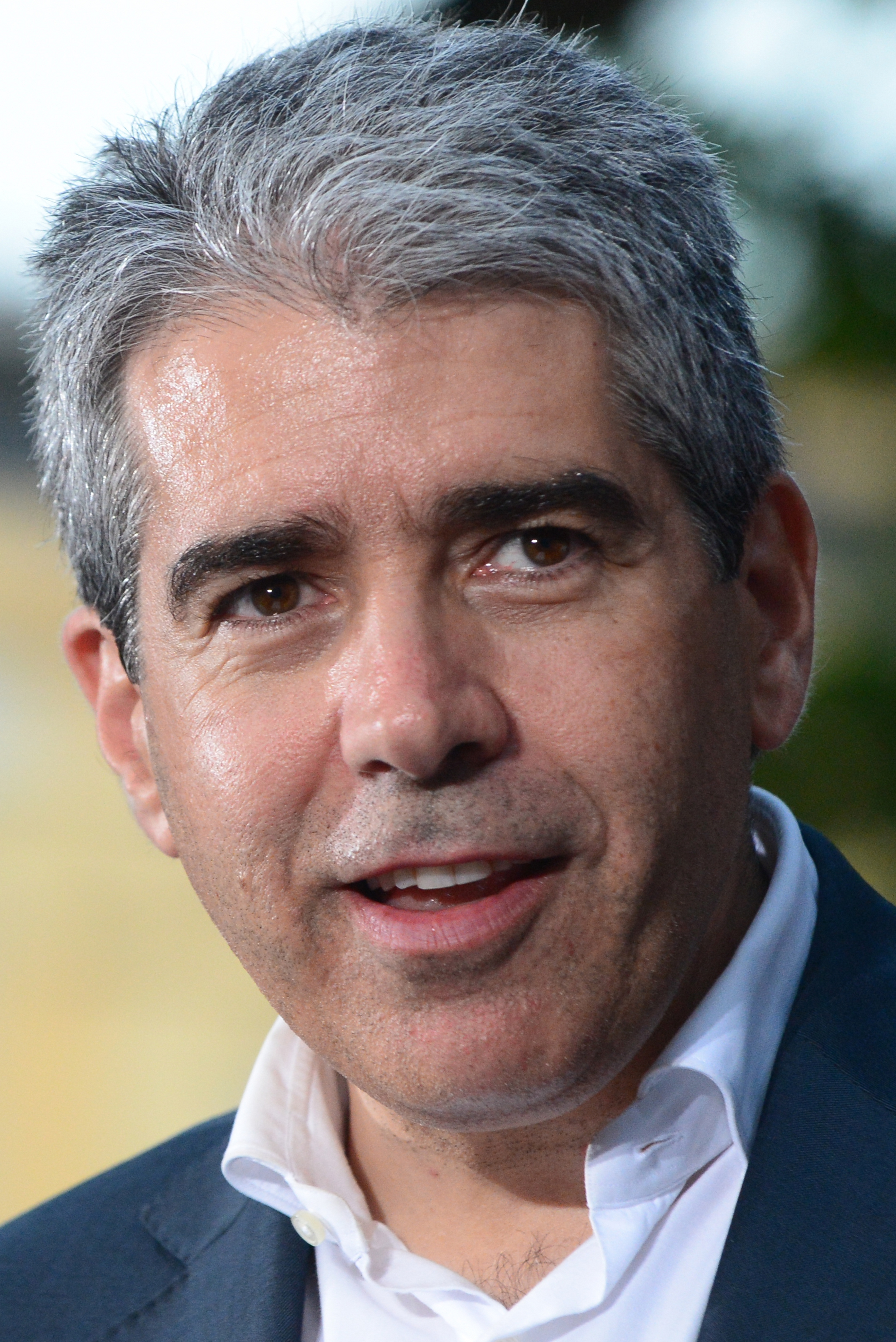
- Homs in 2016

Minister of the Presidency of Catalonia
- In office 27 December 2012 – 16 November 2015
- President: Artur Mas
- Preceded by: Joaquim Nadal
- Succeeded by: Neus Munté

Government Spokesperson of Catalonia
- In office 29 December 2010 – 22 June 2015
- President: Artur Mas
- Preceded by: Aurora Massip
- Succeeded by: Neus Munté

Personal details
- Born: 5 September 1969 (age 57) Vic, Spain
- Party: Democratic Convergence of Catalonia
- Education: Autonomous University of Barcelona

Francesc Homs Molist (born 5 September 1969, in Vic, Barcelona) is a Spanish politician and former Minister of the Presidency and Spokesperson of the Government of Catalonia.

== Early life and education ==
Francesc Homs was born in Vic in 1969 and holds a degree in law from the Autonomous University of Barcelona (UAB). He is married and father to two daughters. In his private life, he is a keen cyclist and a practising Roman Catholic.

== Political career ==
He is Minister of the Presidency and Spokesperson of the Government of Catalonia (Generalitat de Catalunya). Previously, he was Secretary General of the Presidency of the Government of Catalonia (2010–2012) and Director General of Interdepartmental Affairs (2001–2003).

He was a member of the Parliament of Catalonia from 2003 to 2010. He was writer of the draft of the new Statute of Catalonia on behalf of Convergència i Unió (CiU), and speaker of the new Statute (2006).

He has worked in several private companies in the service and banking sectors.

He is Vice-Secretary General of Strategy of Convergència Democràtica de Catalunya (CDC) and member of the Executive National Board of Convergència i Unió (CiU). He was the Head of the Project Great House of Catalanism (Projecte de la Casa Gran del Catalanisme), which aimed to remodel and build on the political catalanism.

== Publications ==
He is the author of the books: Catalunya a Judici, Edicions Ara llibres, 2008; Dret a decidir. Estació concert, Edició Base, 2010.
