= Joaquim Nadal =

Spanish politician and historian

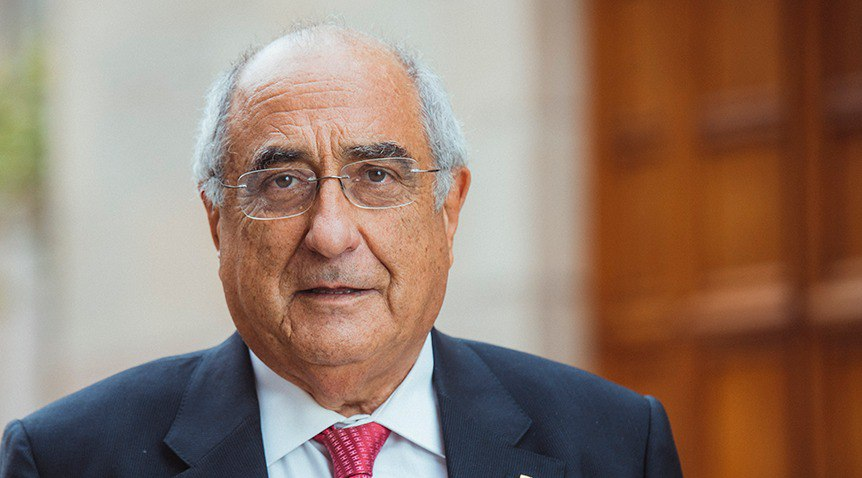
- Nadal in 2022.

Minister of Research and Universities of Catalonia
- In office 10 October 2022 – 12 August 2024
- President: Pere Aragonès
- Preceded by: Gemma Geis
- Succeeded by: Núria Montserrat Pulido

Leader of the Opposition in the Parliament of Catalonia
- In office 23 December 2010 – 3 September 2012
- Preceded by: Artur Mas
- Succeeded by: Xavier Sabaté i Ibarz
- In office 14 December 1995 – 16 November 1999
- Preceded by: Raimon Obiols
- Succeeded by: Pasqual Maragall

Minister of Town and Country Town and Public Works of Catalonia
- In office 17 December 2003 – 29 December 2010
- President: Pasqual Maragall; José Montilla
- Preceded by: Felip Puig
- Succeeded by: Lluís Recoder (as Minister of Planning and Sustainability)

Government Spokesperson of Catalonia
- In office 17 December 2003 – 29 November 2006
- President: Pasqual Maragall
- Preceded by: Felip Puig
- Succeeded by: Aurora Massip

Mayor of Girona
- In office 2 June 1979 – 19 January 2002
- Preceded by: Ignasi de Ribot i Batlle
- Succeeded by: Anna Pagans i Guartmoner

Personal details
- Born: 31 January 1948 (age 78) Girona, Spain
- Citizenship: Spanish
- Party: PSC
- Website: www.joaquimnadal.cat

Joaquim Nadal i Farreras (born 31 January 1948) is a Spanish politician and historian from Catalonia. He is a professor at the University of Girona and was the Minister of Territorial Policy and Public Works of the Catalan Government, the Generalitat de Catalunya, from December 2003 to December 2010.

== Early life, family and education ==
He was born in Girona.

== Years as mayor of Girona (1979–2002) ==
In 1979, he was the first mayor of Girona democratically elected after the Spanish transition, from the PSC). He resigned in 2002, in favour of his substitute Anna Pagans i Gruartmoner, also from the PSC. During his term of office as mayor of Girona, he launched the reform of the Barri Vell (1982), together with the promotion of the Call Jueu, the ancient Jewish neighbourhood. He also put into practice the widening and improvement of the social services’ infrastructures, bringing balance to the inequalities among neighbourhoods. As mayor of Girona, he also held the post of president of the Federation of Catalan Municipalities (1981–1985).

He was the PSC candidate for the presidency of the Generalitat in the 1995 elections for the Catalan Parliament, of which he was member from 1984 to 2012. He is the first secretary of the Socialists' Party of Catalonia (PSC) at Girona since 2008.

== Period in Catalan government (2003–2010) ==
In the year 2003, he joined the government of Pasqual Maragall (PSC) as Councillor of Territorial Policy and Public Works, also serving as the Spokesman of the Catalan Government. He was considered the fourth-ranking member of the government. Nadal presided the Department of Territorial Policy and Public Works in 2005 during the crisis of El Carmel, when construction work to lengthen Barcelona Metro line 5 caused a building to collapse and forced the evacuation of 84 other buildings. Convergence and Union, then the opposition group in the Catalan Parliament, called on Nadal to resign, considering him the councillor responsible for the safety of public works projects, whereas the government blamed the opposition party for poor planning of the project during the last government of Jordi Pujol. As head of the department, Nadal promoted and approved the Catalan Plan for Transport Infrastructures to regulate all new road and railway infrastructures of Catalonia until 2026. The plan included a railway cross axis to link central Catalonia with the Lleida and Girona areas.

When the governing three-party coalition was broken by the removal of those councillors belonging to the Republican Left of Catalonia in May 2006, Nadal became Councillor of the Presidency, a position he held until the end of the legislature later that year. In November 2006, the newly elected President of the Generalitat, José Montilla, reappointed him Councillor of Territorial Policy and Public Works.

== Opposition leader ==
Nadal became the Leader of the Opposition in the Parliament of Catalonia in December 2012, upon constitution of the 9th Legislature, with Convergence and Union forming a minority government and the Socialists' Party of Catalonia as the opposition party with the most seats. On September 3, 2012, the executive committee of the Socialists' Party of Catalonia decided to replace the party's leadership in Parliament, including Nadal. He was also opposition leader from 1995 to 1999.

== Political thought ==
Among his political stances, he has shown his willingness to consider the granting immigrants the right to vote in municipal elections, which must be conceived, according to his own words, as a “limited ruled project”, “with the utmost rigor” but with a series of “cautions” as, for instance, that the only immigrants with right to vote should be those from countries with which a “reciprocity” agreement exists.

== Academic career and publications ==
Nadal has intermittently taught at the University of Liverpool (1970–1972), the Autonomous University of Barcelona (1972–1992) and the University of Girona (since 1992). His research work has been devoted to the 18th century in Catalonia, 19th-century Spanish economic history and local history, concentrating on various contributions to the history of Girona. Nadal did not run in the 2012 Catalan parliamentary election, announcing he planned to return to his teaching duties at the University of Girona.

Nadal has published a number of books, including:

- Municipi i Ciutat
- Girona com a exemple (1988)
- Girona. Mirant el present, pensant el futur (1991)
- Girona, ciutat viva i de colors (1999)
- La Catedral de Girona (2003)
- Catalunya, Catalanisme i Socialisme (2003)
- Responsible for the edition of the work by Emili Grahit i Papell, Memorias de un ex-alcalde gerundense (2003).
- Vides amb nom (2005), a collection of most of his biographical articles published in the press, Dietari 2003.
- Apunts d'un any electoral (2006)
- Discursos i conferències (2006)
- Quaderns de viatge (2006)
- Per a una Història de Girona. Una bibliografia bàsica (2008).
- El futur comença ara. Converses sobre les comarques de Girona. (with Pia Bosch) (2010).
- Noves vides amb nom (2011)
- Segon llibre de família (2011)
- Fent tentines per la vida (2013)
- Testimoni de càrrec. Vint anys al servei de Catalunya 1993-2012 (2014)

== Joaquim Nadal i Farreras Collection ==
Nadal gifted his personal library, located at the Girona Town Archive, to the University of Girona Library. The collection of around 1,600 books, mainly related to history and was collected throughout his career as a historian and professor, was presented on July 10 at the Gothic Room of the UdG Barri Vell Campus Library, and its cataloguing began in October of the same year.

This collection, with those from Jaume Vicens Vives, Pierre Vilar, Joan Reglà, Jordi Nadal, Ramon Garrabou i Lluís Maria de Puig, confer the UdG a great significance as a center for historical research in Catalonia.

== Bibliography ==
- Clara, Josep. El personal polític de l'Ajuntament de Girona (1917–1987). Girona: Cercle d'Estudis Històrics i Socials, 1987. ISBN 84-505-4982-5
- Ruhi, Albert; Nuss, Sergi (2006). "La síndrome de la variant de Sant Daniel". eldimoni.com. El Dimoni de Santa Eugènia de Ter. Archived from the original on 23 January 2013.

Political offices
Preceded by Felip Puig	Minister of Town and Country Town and Public Works of the Generalitat de Catalunya; 2003 – 2010	Succeeded by Lluís Miquel Recoder i Miralles (as Minister of Minister of Planning and Sustainability)
Preceded by Ignasi de Ribot i de Batlle	Mayor of Girona; 1979–2002	Succeeded by Anna Pagans i Guartmoner
Preceded by First Minister of Catalonia; Josep Bargalló	Minister of Presidency of Catalonia; 2006	Succeeded by Office abolished
Preceded by Artur Mas	Government Spokesperson of the Generalitat de Catalunya; 2003 - 2006	Succeeded by Aurora Massip i Treig
Assembly seats
Preceded by Artur Mas	Leader of the Opposition in the Parliament of Catalonia; 2010 – 2012	Succeeded by Xavier Sabaté i Ibarz
Preceded by Raimon Obiols	Leader of the Opposition in the Parliament of Catalonia; 1995–1999	Succeeded by Pasqual Maragall
