= Irene Rigau =

Spanish politician

The Honourable Irene Rigau i Oliver
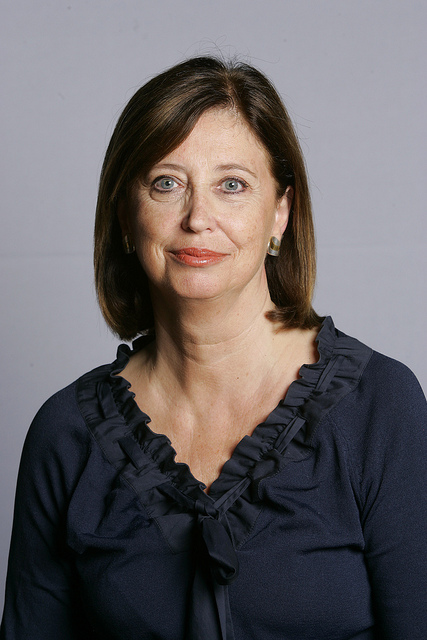
- Rigau in 2012

Counselor of Education of Catalonia
- In office 29 December 2010 – 14 January 2016
- President: Artur Mas
- Preceded by: Ernest Maragall
- Succeeded by: Meritxell Ruiz i Isern

Personal details
- Born: 22 June 1951 (age 74) Banyoles, Catalonia
- Citizenship: Spanish
- Occupation: Teacher

Irene Rigau i Oliver is a Catalan politician from Spain, born in Banyoles (Pla de l'Estany County) in 1951.

== Early life and education ==
A teacher by profession, Rigau holds a psychology degree from the Autonomous University of Barcelona and a diploma in public sector management from ESADE Business School.

In the education sector, Rigau has been a primary school teacher and a schools inspector. She also got licensed as secondary school teacher. Rigau has lectured on psycho-pedagogy at The University of Girona Education Department and on educational policy and schools legislation at the Open University of Catalonia (UOC). From 1982 to 1999 she held a number of management posts in the Catalan administration.

== Political career and conviction ==
Her political career includes four years as Catalan Minister for welfare and family issues (1999-2003). In December 2012 she was appointed education minister of the Government of Catalonia. From 2003 to 2006 she was a member of the Catalan Parliament for Girona Province, and from 2006 to 2017 for Barcelona Province. She was Minister of Social Welfare and Family of the Government of Catalonia from 1999 to 2003 in the last government of Jordi Pujol, and Minister of Education from 2010 to 2016 with Artur Mas.

Rigau appeared in court in Barcelona on 13 October 2015, to face criminal charges of having assisted in the organisation of the 2014 Catalan self-determination referendum, which the Spanish courts deemed illegal. President Artur Mas and vice president Joana Ortega also faced charges. Large public protests took place in Barcelona the same day in support of the accused. In March 2017, the High Court of Justice of Catalonia condemned Artur Mas, Joana Ortega and Irene Rigau to fines and were barred from office between 18 and 24 months. Although they were acquitted of charges of misappropriation of public funds, The Court of Auditors has also been judging them as accounting officers for the referendum preparations and claims 5,2 million euros.
