= Artur Mas =

Catalan politician (born 1956)

The Right Honourable Artur Mas
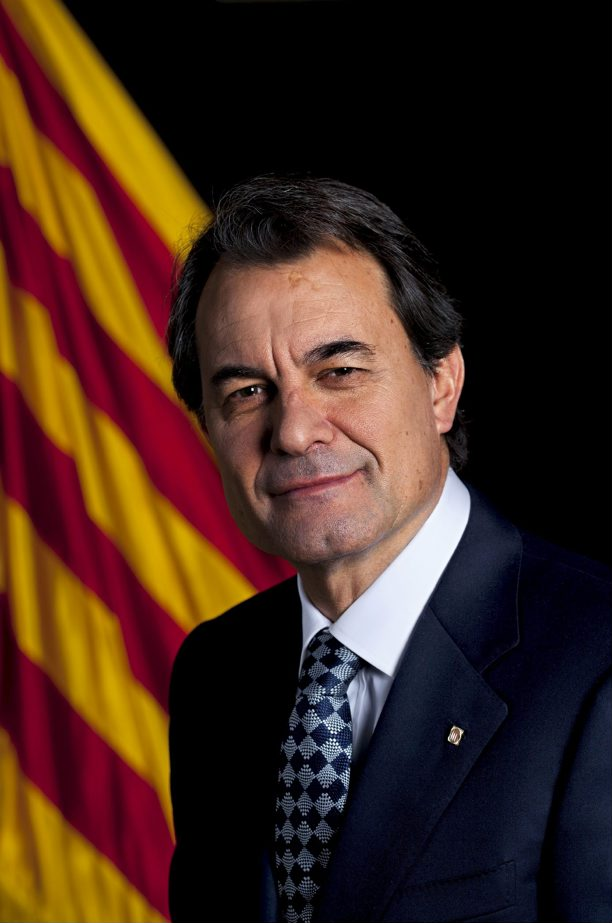
- Official portrait, 2011

129th President of the Government of Catalonia
- In office 24 December 2010 – 11 January 2016
- Monarchs: Juan Carlos I Felipe VI
- Vice President: Joana Ortega; Neus Munté
- Preceded by: José Montilla
- Succeeded by: Carles Puigdemont

First Minister of Catalonia
- In office 19 January 2001 – 20 December 2003
- President: Jordi Pujol
- Preceded by: Josep Tarradellas (1937)
- Succeeded by: Josep-Lluís Carod-Rovira

Government Spokesperson of Catalonia
- In office 2000 – 5 November 2002
- President: Jordi Pujol
- Succeeded by: Felip Puig

Leader of the Opposition in the Parliament of Catalonia
- In office 27 May 2004 – 23 December 2010
- Preceded by: Pasqual Maragall (2003)
- Succeeded by: Joaquim Nadal

Minister of Economy and Finance of Catalonia
- In office 30 July 1997 – 17 January 2001
- President: Jordi Pujol
- Preceded by: Macià Alavedra
- Succeeded by: Francesc Homs Ferret

Minister of Territorial Policy and Public Works of Catalonia
- In office 15 June 1995 – 30 July 1997
- President: Jordi Pujol
- Preceded by: Jaume Roma
- Succeeded by: Pere Macias

Personal details
- Born: Artur Mas i Gavarró; 31 January 1956 (age 70) Barcelona, Catalonia, Spain
- Citizenship: Spanish
- Party: Catalan European Democratic Party (2016–2023); Democratic Convergence of Catalonia (1991–2016)
- Spouse: Helena Rakosnik
- Children: 3
- Education: University of Barcelona (BSS)

Artur Mas i Gavarró (Catalan pronunciation: [əɾˈtuɾ ˈmas]; born 31 January 1956) is a Catalan politician from Spain. He was president of the Government of Catalonia from 2010 to 2015 and acting president from September 2015 to 12 January 2016.

Mas is a long time member of Democratic Convergence of Catalonia (CDC by its Catalan acronym) which used to be the bigger of the two component members –along with Unió Democràtica de Catalunya– of what at the time was a long-standing electoral coalition, Convergència i Unió (CiU), a liberal nationalist coalition which had dominated Catalan regional politics since the 1980s. In 2001 Mas was named general secretary of CDC, then, in 2012 he was named president of the party until the party was refounded in July 2016 as PDeCAT, which he presided between July 2016 and January 2018.

From 2003 to 2015, Mas has run five times for the Catalan presidency, four heading the –nowadays defunct– CiU ticket and one running for the novel Junts pel Sí coalition. He attained the presidency in two elections, 2010 and 2012 (both running for CiU) but neither with an absolute majority. In the absence of single party majorities, both tenures were marked by political instability and ended with Mas calling a snap election.

Mas is an economist who obtained his degree from the University of Barcelona, and is fluent in English and French, in addition to Catalan and Spanish.

His ideology tends to be considered liberal from the economic point of view and supportive of Catalan independence. From the social point of view, he has mostly supported a moderate agenda in numerous issues, such as gay rights, but not same-sex marriage and free debate on his party concerning abortion.

In 2010, for the first time, Mas indicated he would vote "Yes" on a hypothetical referendum to secede from Spain. Since then, sovereignty and Catalan independence have become the central part of his political agenda, with Mas being instrumental in CDC's novel turn towards separatism.

== Early life ==
Mas was born in Barcelona as one of the four children of a wealthy industrialist family. His mother was originally from Sabadell and his father from Poblenou. He studied at the Aula escola europea, and is thereby fluent in French, English, Catalan and Spanish. Later he graduated in Economics from the University of Barcelona and married Helena Rakòsnik.

== Politics ==
Before acquiring political responsibilities in Catalonia, Mas held different posts in both the private and public sectors, especially relating to the internationalization of Catalan enterprises. He was a member of the Barcelona City Council from 1987 to 1995, representing the Democratic Convergence of Catalonia. His first high responsibilities in the Catalan government came during the presidency of Jordi Pujol, President of the Generalitat de Catalunya from 1980 to 2003. Artur Mas served as Catalan Minister of Public Works from 1995 to 1997, as Minister of Economy and Finance from 1997 to 2001, and Deputy Prime Minister (conseller en cap) from 2001 to 2003, as well as being the government's official spokesman from 2000 to 2003.

Artur Mas ran for the 2003 elections to the Catalan government and won a plurality of seats in the parliament, with four more than PSC. However, the latter obtained a slightly larger number of votes (this discrepancy between votes and seats obtained is explained by the electoral law and the way seats are assigned). Finally PSC's Pasqual Maragall was elected President, having forged a coalition with two other left-wing parties, the Republican Left of Catalonia (ERC) and Initiative for Catalonia – Greens (ICV).

Mas ran again for president in the 2006 elections. Though his party CiU won these both in number of votes and seats—unlike in the previous election– it did not reach the absolute majority of seats in the parliament, allowing PSC's new candidate, José Montilla, to reach an absolute majority by repeating the coalition government with the same left-wing partners (ERC and ICV).

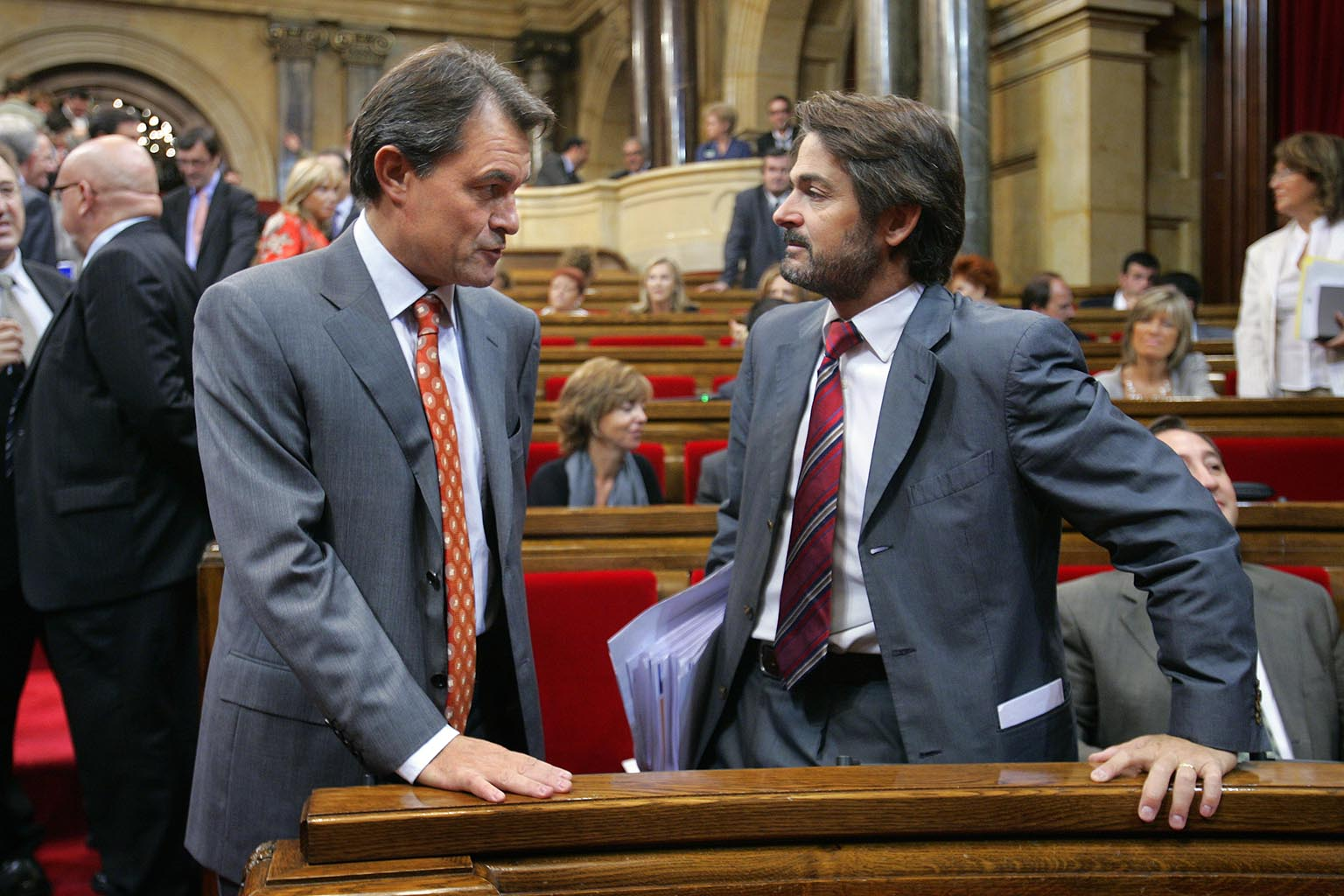
Mas talking to Oriol Pujol at Parliament in 2009

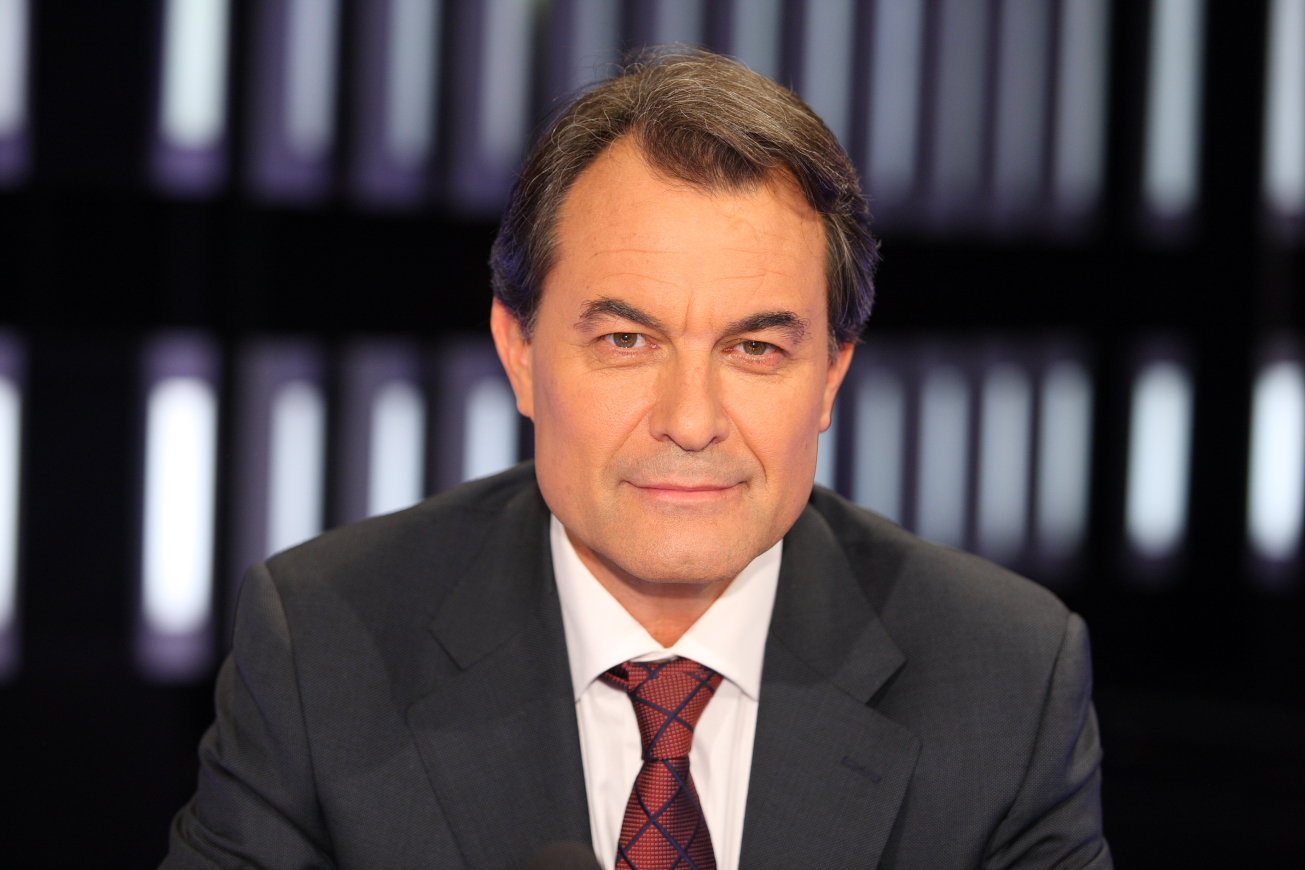
Mas in 2010

Since 2007, he has put special emphasis on initiating a process, known as the Refoundation of Catalanism (in Catalan, Refundació del catalanisme), to build upon the principles and values of the Catalanist movement, in order to enlarge the majority of society in Catalonia that expresses a nationalist feeling, and not merely inside his own party, CDC. The 'Refoundation of Catalanism' that Mas is actively leading calls for Catalonia to obtain the so-called 'Right to decide' on matters that affect it. This implicitly includes the possibility of putting independence from Spain to a hypothetical referendum. This point is significantly closer to the traditionally more separatist positions of Esquerra Republicana de Catalunya and has gained momentum since the issue of the verdict on the Catalan Statute—the Estatut—in July 2010 by the Spanish Constitutional Court, which invalidates certain parts of this law although they were backed by a large majority of Catalan voters by referendum back in 2006 (73.9 Yes, 20.7% No, 49.4% Turnout).

On 9 January 2018, he resigned as president of the PDeCAT, decision that he had made months previously but postponed because of the political crisis. According to what he said, this did not mean his abandoning politics, but that it was taking a back seat.

== Presidency ==
=== 2010–2012 ===
The Catalan elections that took place on 28 November 2010 were to finally determine the political future of Mas, who was for the third time CiU's candidate to the presidency. During the campaign Mas had promised to put into place the government of 'the best' people, including the possibility of appointing ministers ('Consellers') from outside his political coalition, Convergència i Unió, if their talent justified doing so. Moreover, he also engaged in a process which would culminate in full powers over taxation for Catalonia—significantly reducing the so-called 'fiscal deficit' between Catalonia and the whole of Spain—by putting this issue to referendum to the Catalans and as a condition for giving any support to Spanish governments after the Spanish elections scheduled for 2012.

Surveys had indicated that this time his party would obtain enough seats to govern without being heavily dependent on third parties and with no risk of a repetition of left-wing coalitions like those of 2003 and 2006. In the event, CiU won 62 of the 135 seats in the Catalan Parliament, short of an absolute majority.

He was eventually invested as president of the Generalitat on 23 December 2010 thanks to an agreement to get the Socialists' Party of Catalonia (PSC) abstention in the vote In the investiture speech, Mas claimed a new funding model for Catalonia inspired by the Economic Agreement and proclaimed the Catalonia national transition based on the "right to decide".

The agreement with the PSC proved fragile, which forced Mas to seek new allies in the regional parliament, this time engaging in talks with the Popular Party (PP). By negotiating PP's abstention, Mas was eventually able to pass the 2012 public budget.

=== 2012–2015: Catalan independence movement ===
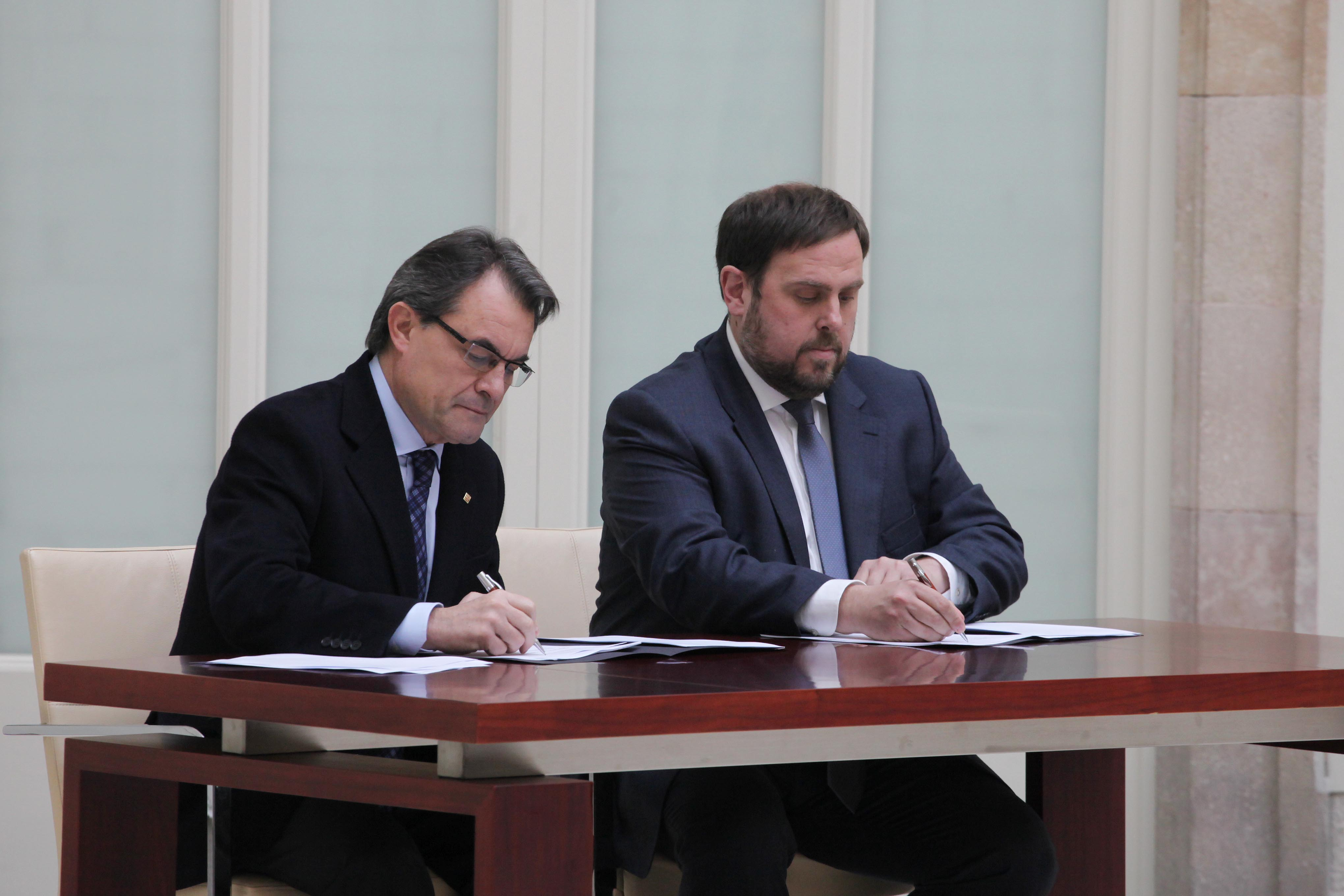
Artur Mas and Oriol Junqueras (Leader of the Opposition in the Parliament of Catalonia), signing the 2012–2016 governability agreement in December 2012

In September 2012, less than 2 years into his first term and only months after having closed a de facto agreement with the PP, Artur Mas declared in a speech to Parliament that it was time for the people of Catalonia to exercise the right of self-determination. The declaration had come as fallout from the massive 2012 Catalan independence demonstration which had gathered an estimated number of participants ranging from 600,000 to 1.5 million. Hence, on 25 September 2012, Mas announced snap elections for the Parliament of Catalonia to be held on 25 November and argued, referring to the demonstration, that "the street vocal must be moved to the polls".

Despite Mas going to the polls with a view to attain an absolute majority in the regional parliament Mas' led coalition lost in the event 12 seats, making it the biggest loser out of the snap election. Still, the sum of parties defending Catalonia's independence from Spain (CiU and ERC) significantly increased their votes due to ERC's growth compensating CiU's losses; the aggregated support for both parties reached 44.4% of the total and thanks to the electoral law this combined rate was enough to ensure that between both parties they could control more than half the Catalan Parliament seats.

As a result of the election, Mas, on behalf of CiU, had to engage in talks for a stable government, this time with Oriol Junqueras (ERC), who refused to enter a coalition government with Mas but stayed as Leader of the Opposition in the Parliament of Catalonia; however, ERC agreed general support to the CiU government and CiU agreed to coordinate with ERC the goals of the legislature; this was termed by the signataries as the "Agreement for Freedom". Artur Mas was invested for the second time President of Catalonia on 21 December 2012 and on 24 December he took up office at the Palace of the Government of Catalonia.

On 12 December 2013, Artur Mas, with leaders of five Catalan parliamentary parties, announced the date for the Catalan self-determination referendum, that was set for Sunday 9 November 2014 and contained a question with two sections: "Do you want Catalonia to become a State?" and "In case of an affirmative response, do you want this State to be independent?". In April 2014 the proposal was presented to the Spanish Parliament and it was defeated by a vote of 299–47. Mas, both before and after this vote has declared that the referendum would take place in a legal manner, but under the Spanish Constitution, referendums on sovereignty must be held nationally and not regionally, which prompted the Spanish government to veto any such referendum.

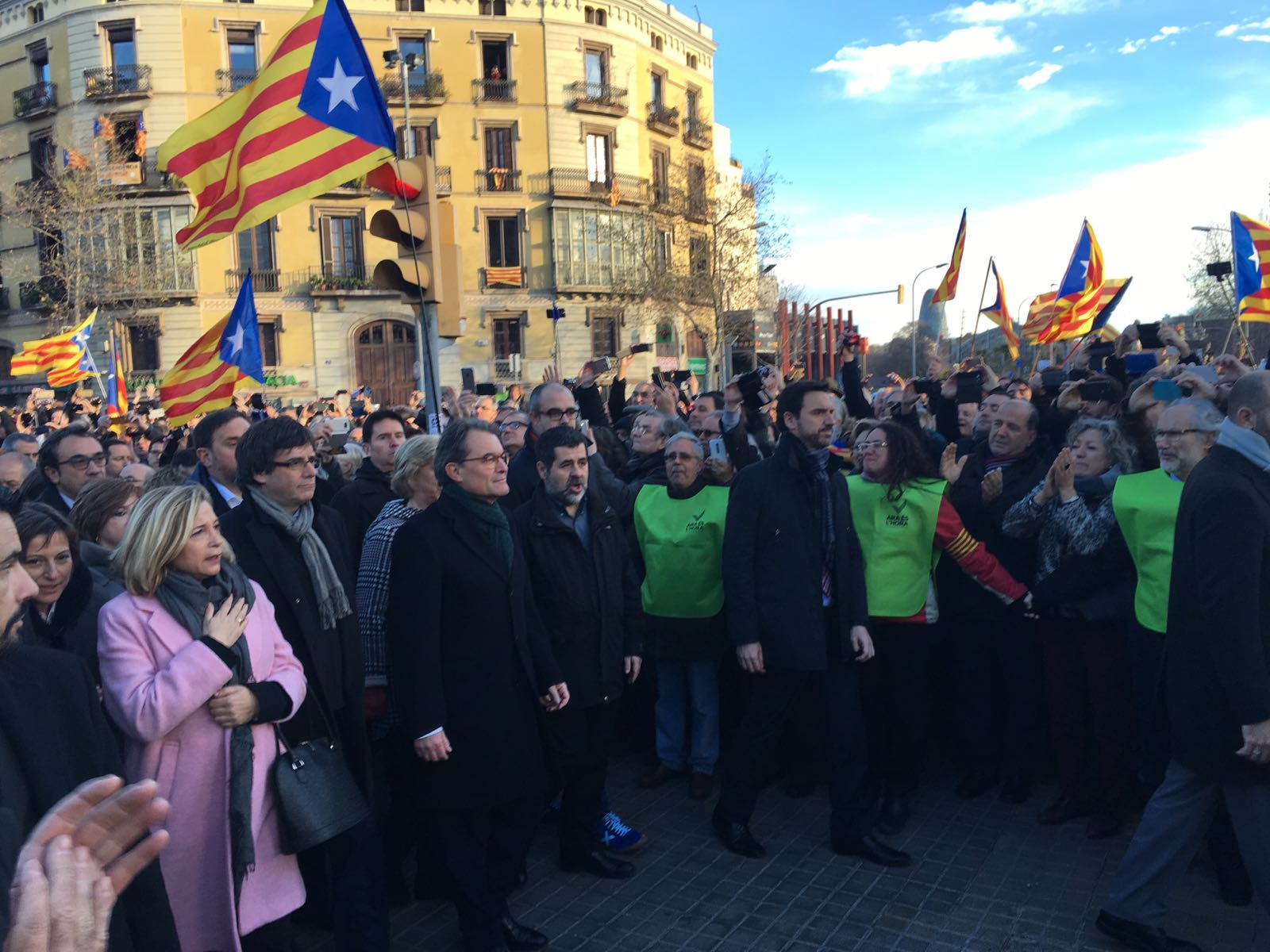
Protest against the trial of Artur Mas, Joana Ortega and Irene Rigau on 6 February 2017

=== Conviction ===
Mas intended to avoid prosecution by reducing it to a non-binding and purely symbolic vote, and staffing it with volunteers. Despite these efforts the Spanish Central Government still deemed the vote as unconstitutional and thus illegal. Eventually, Mas went ahead in defiance of an order from Spain's constitutional court, leading to his trial. Mas was charged by the attorney general with perverting the course of justice, misuse of public funds and abuse of power, with regards to the role he assumed in the unofficial referendum. A trial was opened, Mas rested accused of abuse of power and disobedience, as a result facing a ban from holding public office of up to 10 years.

In the event, in March 2017 Mas was barred from public office for two years by a court in Barcelona for organizing an illegal vote in defiance of the Spanish courts. He was also fined 36,500 euros.

== Stances ==
In February 2012, in an interview to La Vanguardia, Mas made a statement saying that "the cultural DNA of Catalans is intertwined with our long belonging to the Franco-Germanic world. Catalonia, after all, long belonged to the Marca Hispanica and its capital was Aachen, the heart of the Carolingian Empire. Something must endure in our DNA, because we Catalans have an umbilical cord that makes us more Germanic than Roman."

Mas espouses the vision that "Spain can only become a full nation if Catalonia ceases to be a part of it".

== 2015 election ==
As a result of the political instability resulting from the referendum issue, Mas called a second consecutive snap election. Due to internal tensions within the coalition regarding the separatist turn led by Mas, CDC and Unió did not agree to reform CiU, hence putting an end to 37 years of cooperation between both parties.

Instead, CDC joined forces with ERC in Junts pel Sí, a novel coalition which made public that Mas was going to be its candidate for the presidency, despite not being headed by him (as a result of balance of power negotiations within the coalition, Mas was placed fourth in the electoral ticket). The new coalition attained 62 seats, failing to secure an absolute majority. Unlike the previous election in 2012, support from other parties in the regional parliament could not be taken for granted in 2015, because ERC, which had previously supported CiU's government, had joined CDC in the Junts pel Sí coalition.

The only prospective partner willing to negotiate with Junts pel Sí was the far-left separatist party Popular Unity Candidacy (CUP). After a lengthy period of negotiations started just after the election took place on September 27, Mas was vetoed by the CUP. In January 2016, after three months of what was defined as "rancorous infighting" in the separatist camp, Mas eventually stepped down at the eleventh hour from his candidature for the presidency in order to allow a government to be formed and a third consecutive snap election to be avoided. At that point, Mas also resigned from his seat in the parliament, remarking that he would place his “personal efforts in rebuilding what Convergència Democràtica de Catalunya (CDC) means and represents in Catalonia”.

Subsequently, as CDC was refounded as PDeCAT, Mas retained the presidential role in the refounded party. On 9 January 2018, he renounced the presidential role of PDeCAT.

== Bibliography ==
- Nagel, Klaus-Jürgen (2015). "Religion and the political accommodation of Catalonia. A non-relation?". Politics of Religion and Nationalism: Federalism, Consociationalism and Seccession. In: Ferran Requejo and Klaus-Jürgen Nagel (Eds.). Routledge: 194–210. ISBN 978-1-138-02414-4.

Political offices
Preceded by Jaume Roma	Minister of Town and Country Town and Public Works of Catalonia; 1995–1997	Succeeded by Pere Macias
Preceded by Macià Alavedra	Minister of Economy and Finance of Catalonia; 1997–2001	Succeeded by Francesc Homs Ferret
New office	Government Spokesperson of Catalonia; 1999–2003	Succeeded by Joaquim Nadal
Vacant Title last held by Josep Tarradellas	Prime Minister of Catalonia; 2001–2003	Succeeded by Josep-Lluís Carod-Rovira
Vacant Title last held by Pasqual Maragall	Leader of the Opposition of Catalonia; 2004–2010	Succeeded by Joaquim Nadal
Preceded by José Montilla	President of the Government of Catalonia; 2010–2016	Succeeded by Carles Puigdemont
Party political offices
Preceded by Jordi Pujol	President of Democratic Convergence of Catalonia; 2012–present	Incumbent
Preceded by Pere Esteve	General Secretary of Democratic Convergence of Catalonia; 2000–2012	Succeeded by Oriol Pujol i Ferrusola
Preceded by Jordi Pujol	President of Convergence and Union; 2004–2015	Succeeded by Party dissolved
