= Felip Puig =

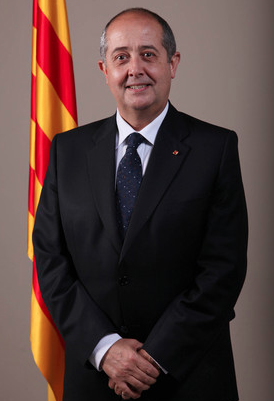

Felip Puig Godes (born 1958) is a counselor for Enterprise and Employment who served in the past as the interior counselor of the region of Catalonia in Spain from 2010 to 2012. Previously, he had been environment counselor (1999–2001) and public works counselor (2001–2003). From 2002 to 2003 he also held the post of the regional government's spokesman. Earlier positions in the regional government include secretary general of the Welfare Counseling Office and chairman and managing director of ADIGSA, a former public corporation managing public housing.

Since 2003, Puig holds a seat in the regional Parliament of Catalonia, where he served as spokesman for the ruling coalition Convergence and Union (CiU) until December 2007, while it was the main opposition force. He had previously been a councillor in Parets del Vallès, some 20 kilometers north of Barcelona, and a county councillor in Vallès Oriental, to which this town belongs.

Puig was born in Barcelona and gained a bachelor's degree in civil engineering from Barcelona Tech (UPC), and a diploma in business administration from the Technical University of Madrid (UPM).
