= Democratic Convergence of Catalonia =

Democratic Convergence of Catalonia Convergència Democràtica de Catalunya
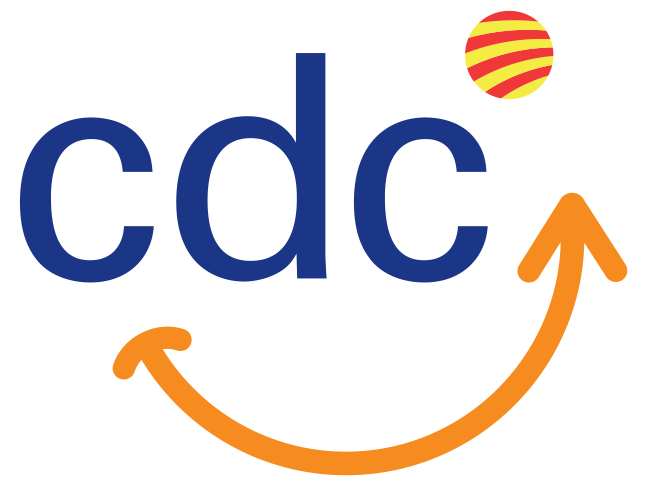
- Abbreviation: CDC
- Founder: Jordi Pujol
- Founded: 17 November 1974
- Registered: 23 February 1977
- Dissolved: 10 July 2016 (refoundation) (Note: CDC was "refounded" into the Catalan European Democratic Party (PDeCAT), which assumed CDC's political activity, but CDC was not legally dissolved nor its trademark removed from the electoral register and retains full legal personality.)
- Succeeded by: Catalan European Democratic Party
- Headquarters: Historical: C/ Còrsega, 331-333; 08037, Barcelona; Last: C/ Consell de Cent, 113-115, bjs. 08015, Barcelona
- Youth wing: Nationalist Youth of Catalonia (1980–2016)
- Ideology: Catalan independence (Note: from 2012); Catalan nationalism; Liberalism; Conservative liberalism; Minority: Social democracy
- Political position: Centre-right
- Regional affiliation: PDpC (1977–78); DiC (1977–78); CiU (1978–2015); Catalonia in the Senate (1982–83); JxSí (2015–16); DiL (2015–16); JuntsxCat (2017–19) (Note: CDC's trademark was registered as part of the Together of Catalonia alliance ahead of the 2017 Catalan regional election, in order to allow its successor party, PDeCAT, to be guaranteed the public funding and electoral rights corresponding to CDC for the campaign. This practice was discontinued ahead of the general election repetition in November 2019.)
- European affiliation: ALDE Party
- European Parliament group: ALDE Group (2004–2016); ELDR (1987–2004)
- Colors: Blue; Orange

Website
- www.cdccat.com

The Democratic Convergence of Catalonia (Catalan: Convergència Democràtica de Catalunya [kumbəɾˈʒɛnsi.ə ðəmuˈkɾatikə ðə kətəˈluɲə], CDC), frequently shortened as Convergence (Catalan: Convergència [kumbəɾˈʒɛnsi.ə]) was a Catalan nationalist, liberal political party in Catalonia (Spain), currently still existing without any political activity.

The party was originally created around the figure of Jordi Pujol in 1974, but it was not legally registered until February 1977. Between 1978 and 2015, the party was a member of the Convergence and Union (CiU) alliance that dominated Catalan politics for almost the entirety of its existence; first as an electoral alliance with the christian democratic Democratic Union of Catalonia (UDC), then as a party federation on 2 December 2001. For 37 years, both parties contested all elections under the CiU umbrella, being the first political group in the Parliament of Catalonia for its entire history and forming the regional government for nearly three decades (1980–2003 and 2010–2015). In June 2015, the CiU federation split over the issue of Catalan independence.

On 8–10 July 2016, the party was refounded into the Catalan European Democratic Party (PDeCAT), with CDC's political activity being passed to the new party, though CDC has remained active as a way to preserve its public funding and electoral rights in favour of the PDeCAT and the Together for Catalonia alliance. At the time of the party's refoundation in July 2016, it had 15,019 members.

== History ==
=== Origin ===
The party was founded on 17 November 1974 in Santa Maria de Montserrat Abbey as a "political movement" centered around the figure of Jordi Pujol. After the death of dictator Francisco Franco and in the wake of the Spanish transition to democracy, CDC was constituted as a political party in February 1976, being officially registered as such one year later in 1977. Convergence's aim would be to articulate itself as a transversal big tent political platform, able of bringing together various social sectors—from left to right in the political spectrum—of public life in Catalonia.

Ahead of the first democratic election on 15 June 1977, CDC formed the Democratic Pact for Catalonia electoral alliance for the Congress of Deputies, together with the Socialist Party of Catalonia–Regrouping (PSC–R), Democratic Left of Catalonia (EDC) and the National Front of Catalonia (FNC); for the Spanish Senate it formed the Democracy and Catalonia coalition with the PSC–R, EDC and Democratic Union of Catalonia (UDC). In the spring of 1978, a sector of the party unsuccessfully proposed its renaming as "Nationalist Party of Catalonia", a name which would be used by several party members 42 years later for another political force.

On 19 September 1978, CDC and UDC established the Convergence and Union (CiU) alliance, under which both parties would contest together all elections held in Catalonia throughout the next 37 years together. From the 1979 Spanish general election onwards, CDC and UDC would maintain the CiU alliance for all elections at all levels of administration: local, regional and general.

=== Political hegemony ===
Until their split in June 2015, the CiU alliance would dominate Catalan regional politics from the 1980s to the early 2000s, providing for Jordi Pujol's long stay in the regional government for 23 consecutive years, until a left-wing alliance comprising the Socialists' Party of Catalonia (PSC), Republican Left of Catalonia (ERC) and Initiative for Catalonia Greens (ICV) was able to oust CiU from government and into opposition. It would not be until the 2010 Catalan regional election held seven years later that CiU, under Artur Mas's leadership, was returned to government.

Beyond its dominance of Catalan politics, CDC sought to have influence in the Spanish parliament, collaborated with governments both under the Spanish Socialist Workers' Party (PSOE) (and more critically, in the 1993–1996 period when the PSOE was forced into a minority government) as well as under the People's Party (PP) (1996–2004), giving their support to both parties's attempts to form government, then maintaining confidence and supply agreements with them. CiU's support to Felipe González's government provided for the development of the "state of autonomies" the foundations for the financing of the autonomous communities. Under the PP governments of José María Aznar, CDC supported the liberalizing and budgetary control measures that allowed Spain to eventually adopt the euro as the country's currency. In the so-called "Majestic Pacts" signed between CiU and the PP after the latter's victory in the 1996 Spanish general election, both parties had also agreed to further expand on the development of regional financing started during González's tenure, the abolition of compulsory military service and the devolution of powers to the autonomous communities.

Pujol's retirement ahead of the 2003 Catalan regional election prompted Artur Mas—who served as chief minister (Catalan: Conseller en cap) and Pujol's protégée during the late stages of his government—as his successor as CDC leader and CiU leading candidate. After CiU's victory in the 2010 regional election, Mas would become the new president of the Government of Catalonia, introducing previously unseen variable geometry in the region's politics: first by partnering with the opposition's main party the PSC, then seeking collaboration with the local PP branch for approving the regional budget. As a result of the 11 September 2012 demonstration, Mas sought to capitalize on the social momentum of independence by triggering a snap election for 25 November, hoping to expand his parliamentary majority and attain an absolute majority; instead, his party suffered a severe setback by falling from 62 to 50 seats, having to rely on the support of the pro-independence Republican Left of Catalonia (ERC) to keep himself in power. Frictions with CDC's alliance partner UDC over the issue of independence ended up in the termination of CiU as a political project in June 2015.

Concurrently, the party had been shaken by CDC founder Jordi Pujol's confession on 25 July 2014 that he had hidden "money located abroad" from the Public Treasury for 34 years, allegedly attributed to his father's, Florenci Pujol, heritage. In his statement, Pujol regretted never having found the "right time" for the regularization of these amounts of money and asked the public for forgiveness. Various media outlets pointed out that this money was located in secret bank accounts abroad and could have benefitted from the fiscal amnesty promoted by the Spanish government of Mariano Rajoy in 2012. Coupled with the ongoing judicial investigations on an alleged CDC corruption scandal involving the payment of illegal commissions in exchange for the award of public works—in what would be known as the "3% case" because of that amount being the percentage of the public works' budgets that was to be illegally paid—Pujol's confession caused a profound commotion in Catalan society, which had the former president as a revered public figure with a large amount of influence.

Following CiU's breakup, CDC contested the 2015 Catalan regional election within the Junts pel Sí coalition, and the 2015 Spanish general election within the Democracy and Freedom alliance. The 2016 Spanish general election would be the only one in CDC's long electoral history which the party would contest entirely on its own.

=== Refoundation and legacy ===
In a party ballot held on 21 May 2016 to determine the party's future, CDC members were asked whether they backed a "renovation" of the party as it was, or instead supported a full "refoundation" with the establishment of a new, different party, leading to a 67–32% result in favour of refoundation. As a result, during its congress held from 8 to 10 July 2016, the new Catalan European Democratic Party (PDeCAT) was established, out of a desire for presenting a renewed trademark disassociated from CDC's corruption scandals, occurring during its long-term dominance of Catalan regional politics. The refoundation, intended as a pre-ordained scheme which the party's grassroots ultimately took away from its leadership, would only hasten the blurring of the post-convergent political space, after seeing the loss of the historical CDC label, the dilution of the PDeCAT within the Junts pel Sí parliamentary group with a number of various parties and independents, the increasing influence of Catalan president Carles Puigdemont in regional politics even after his ousting and subsequent self-exile in late October 2017 and the eventual coalescing of former pro-independence CDC members around the Together for Catalonia umbrella, dominated by Puigdemont's own party, the National Call for the Republic.

Several parties would be formed from splinter CDC/PDeCAT elements weary of Puigdemont's growing influence and seeking to occupy the vacuum left by CiU's dissolution and appeal to Convergence's "orphan" voters. These included the Free (Lliures) party founded by former regional minister Antoni Fernández Teixidó, Convergents (CNV) of former regional minister of justice Germà Gordó, the Democratic League (LD) of political scientist Astrid Barrio and the Nationalist Party of Catalonia (PNC) led by former PDeCAT coordinator-general between 2016 and 2018 Marta Pascal.

=== Corruption convictions ===
On 15 January 2018, a court in Barcelona ruled that CDC had received €6.6 million in illegal commissions from building firm Ferrovial between 1999 and 2009, in exchange for public works contracts. The scheme used the Palau de la Música Catalana concert venue as a front for false invoicing. Twelve people were jailed and fined millions. The former CDC treasurer Daniel Osàcar was sentenced to four years and five months in prison and fined €3.7 million for influence peddling and money laundering. Fèlix Millet, the former director of the Palau, was jailed for just under 10 years and fined €4.1 million and his deputy, Jordi Montull, received a 7 years and six months sentence and was fined €2.9 million. Millet and Montull were the individuals who benefited most from the scam, controlling the Palau's funds. The Turkey Telegraph noted the "final impunity of the CDC leaders", and also the impunity for the company that paid illegal commissions. Earlier in January, Artur Mas, who was a close ally of Osàcar, had stepped down as party president.

== Electoral performance ==
=== Parliament of Catalonia ===
Parliament of Catalonia
Election	Votes	%	#	Seats	+/–	Leading candidate	Status in legislature
1980	Within CiU			35 / 135	—	Jordi Pujol	Minority
1984	Within CiU			56 / 135	21	Jordi Pujol	Coalition (CiU–ERC)
1984	Within CiU			56 / 135	21	Jordi Pujol	Majority (from February 1987)
1988	Within CiU			54 / 135	2	Jordi Pujol	Majority
1992	Within CiU			54 / 135	0	Jordi Pujol	Majority
1995	Within CiU			46 / 135	8	Jordi Pujol	Minority
1999	Within CiU			43 / 135	3	Jordi Pujol	Minority
2003	Within CiU			33 / 135	10	Artur Mas	Opposition
2006	Within CiU			34 / 135	1	Artur Mas	Opposition
2010	Within CiU			45 / 135	11	Artur Mas	Minority
2012	Within CiU			37 / 135	8	Artur Mas	Minority (CDC–UDC)
2012	Within CiU			37 / 135	8	Artur Mas	Minority (CDC; from June 2015)
2015	Within JxSí			30 / 135	7	Artur Mas	Coalition (CDC–ERC)

=== Cortes Generales ===
==== Nationwide ====
Cortes Generales
Election	Congress					Senate		Leading candidate	Status in legislature
Election	Votes	%	#	Seats	+/–	Seats	+/–	Leading candidate	Status in legislature
1977	Within PDC/DiC			5 / 350	—	2 / 207	—	Jordi Pujol	Opposition
1979	Within CiU			7 / 350	2	1 / 208	1	Jordi Pujol	Opposition
1982	Within CiU/CatSen			9 / 350	2	4 / 208	3	Miquel Roca	Opposition
1986	Within CiU			13 / 350	4	7 / 208	3	Miquel Roca	Opposition
1989	Within CiU			13 / 350	0	8 / 208	1	Miquel Roca	Opposition
1993	Within CiU			12 / 350	1	7 / 208	1	Miquel Roca	Confidence and supply
1996	Within CiU			11 / 350	1	6 / 208	1	Joaquim Molins	Confidence and supply
2000	Within CiU			11 / 350	0	6 / 208	0	Xavier Trias	Opposition
2004	Within CiU			6 / 350	5	4 / 208	2	Josep Antoni Duran i Lleida	Opposition
2008	Within CiU			6 / 350	0	4 / 208	0	Josep Antoni Duran i Lleida	Opposition
2011	Within CiU			10 / 350	4	7 / 208	3	Josep Antoni Duran i Lleida	Opposition
2015	Within DiL			7 / 350	3	5 / 208	2	Francesc Homs	New election
2016	483,488	2.01%	6th	8 / 350	1	2 / 208	3	Francesc Homs	Opposition

==== Regional breakdown ====
Election	Catalonia						
Election	Congress					Senate	
Election	Votes	%	#	Seats	+/–	Seats	+/–
1977	Within PDC/DiC			5 / 47	—	2 / 16	—
1979	Within CiU			7 / 47	2	1 / 16	1
1982	Within CiU/CatSen			9 / 47	2	4 / 16	3
1986	Within CiU			13 / 47	4	7 / 16	3
1989	Within CiU			13 / 46	0	8 / 16	1
1993	Within CiU			12 / 47	1	7 / 16	1
1996	Within CiU			11 / 46	1	6 / 16	1
2000	Within CiU			11 / 46	0	6 / 16	0
2004	Within CiU			6 / 47	5	4 / 16	2
2008	Within CiU			6 / 47	0	4 / 16	0
2011	Within CiU			10 / 47	4	7 / 16	3
2015	Within DiL			7 / 47	3	5 / 16	2
2016	483,488	13.90%	6th	8 / 47	1	2 / 16	3

=== European Parliament ===
European Parliament
Election	Total				
Election	Votes	%	#	Seats	+/–
1987	Within CiU			2 / 60	—
1989	Within CiU			1 / 60	1
1994	Within CiU			2 / 64	1
1999	Within CiU			2 / 64	0
2004	Within CiU (Galeusca)			1 / 54	1
2009	Within CiU (CEU)			1 / 54	0
2014	Within CiU (CEU)			1 / 54	0

== See also ==
- Liberalism and radicalism in Spain
- Catalan independence

== Bibliography ==
- Slomp, Hans (2011). Europe, a Political Profile: An American Companion to European Politics. ABC-CLIO. ISBN 978-0-313-39182-8.
