= Censorship in Spain =

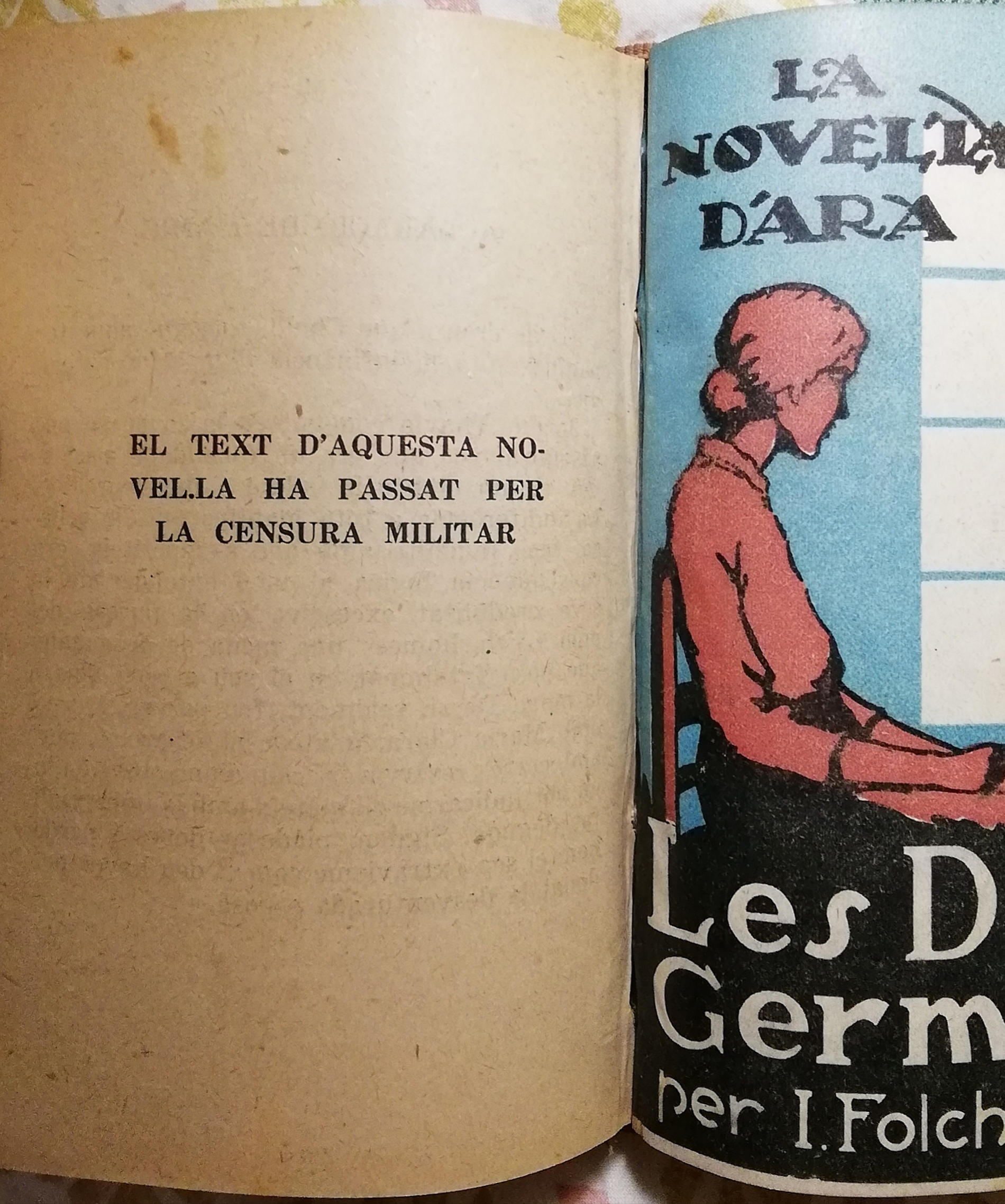
The cover of a catalan book saying that it passed through censorship.

Censorship in Spain involves the suppression of speech or public communication and raises issues of freedom of speech.

The non-profit Reporters Without Borders, on its 2020 report, placed the country in the 29 out of 180 position with respect its level of freedom of the press. It cited the Law on Citizen Security, also known as the Gag Law, as one of the main obstacles to freedom of speech.

== Basque nationalism ==
Some media linked to Basque nationalism, in particular some linked to the abertzale left, have been object of censorship. During the decade of 1990, the national police investigated the alleged relation between the basque newspaper Egin and the armed group ETA. The newspaper closed in 1998 by order of the judge Baltasar Garzón. In 2009, the court resolved that the activity of the newspaper was legal. However, after 11 years of closure, the newspaper could not open again.

After the closure of Egin, one of its journalist, Pepe Rei, continued his work in the Ardi Beltza magazine, which in 2001 was closed by order of Baltasar Garzón too. This order was later revoked.

In 2003, Juan del Olmo, judge of the Audiencia Nacional, orderer the temporary closure the newspaper Egunkaria during six month, and the embargo of all its property, with an accusation of being part of a business conglomerate controlled by ETA. The closure order was repeatedly extended during seven years, until all accused were absolved in 2010.

In January 2011, the Audiencia Nacional ordered the closure of the website Apurtu.org. In 2013 the case was dismissed but the website never opened again. One of the arrested during the case, Miguel Ángel Llamas, spent 18 months in prison without a trial. One month before the dismissal of the case, the Audiencia Nacional ordered the closure of the website Ateak Ireki, considering it the successor of Apurtu.org. After the dismissal of the Apurtu.org, the precautionary measures against Ateak Ireki remained. In order to avoid a long legal process to open Ateak Ireki, a new project was crowdfunded to open a new online media project. The result of it was the news portal Ahotsa.info.

In 2013, the Audiencia Nacional closed a local online newspaper of Burlada, BurtlataHerria, accusing the administrator of apology of terrorism. A year later he was absolved, but the website did not open again.

In 2013, Eloy Velasco, judge of the Audiencia Nacional, presented criminal charges for apology of terrorism against seven member of the youth organization Ernai and ordered the closure of their website. The judge also ordered Topatu to take down videos of their press coverage of a festival organized by Ernai, considering it apology for terrorism too. Topatu took the videos down and three of its journalists were called as witnesses in court.

== Insults to the Crown ==
Insults to the Crown (The king and royal family as institution representative of the whole nation) are a criminal offense in Spain, according to articles 490.3 and 491 of the Spanish Criminal Code. This crime is controversial amongst different political forces. Some of the processed for this crime are the satirical magazine El Jueves, the newspapers Deia and Gara, the magazine Punto y Hora de Euskal Herria, politicians of the United Left party, the abertzale left, the left Catalan independence movement and music bands.

== Law on Citizen Security of 2015 ==
The Organic Law 4/2015, 30 March, of the protection of citizen security, also known as the Gag Law, is an organic law, that entered into force on 1 July 2015, replacing the previous law known as the Corcuera Law. The law restricted public demonstrations by placing restrictions on where and when protests can take place, as well as fines of up to €30,000 for violations of this law. The Gag law imposes fines for disrespectful behavior towards authorities and restricts use of images of police units without the permission.

== 2017 Catalan independence referendum ==
During the days before the 2017 Catalan independence referendum, the Civil Guard closed the official website of the referendum by order of the High Court of Justice of Catalonia. It also closed or blocked multiple alternative domains, official and non official. It blocked the main gateway of the InterPlanetary File System (IPFS), gateway.ipfs.io, which was being used to access the blocked websites.

On 20 September the Civil Guard entered the headquarters of the Fundació puntCat, which administers the top-level domain .cat, and arrested the director of IT, Pep Masoliver. The Internet Society and the Electronic Frontier Foundation denounced the mandate for domain name registrars to exercise Internet censorship tasks.

By 27 September, more than 140 websites related to the referendum were blocked. On 11 October, the official website of the Assemblea Nacional Catalana organization, assemblea.cat, was blocked.

== Social Media Ban for kids under 16 ==
Following the social media ban in Australia in 2025, the president of the government of Spain Pedro Sánchez announced the social media ban for kids under 16 years. Social medias like Tik Tok, X (formerly Twitter) and Instagram will be required to implement the age verification system.

Currently, as of april 2026, legal works are being done and social medias are still available to kids.

== Other cases ==
In 2000, the Spanish Data Protection Agency initiated a process against the Association Against Torture. This association published annual reports on torture cases in Spain and published them in their website, hosted by Nodo50. The website closed to avoid a fine of up to 100 millions of pesetas for publishing the names of police agents and prison officials denounced for torture cases. Despite the closure, multiple websites hosted in other countries replicated the content, which remains accessible.

Since 2020, the Canadian pro-abortion non-profit Women on Web has been censored by various Spanish ISPs in order to prevent access by Spanish residents.

== See also ==
- Human rights in Spain
