= CSQP =

CSQP may refer to:

- Certified Supplier Quality Professional, an American Society for Quality (ASQ) certification
- Catalunya Sí que es Pot, a 2015 Catalan left-wing political coalition
