= Lluís Rabell =

Spanish activist and politician

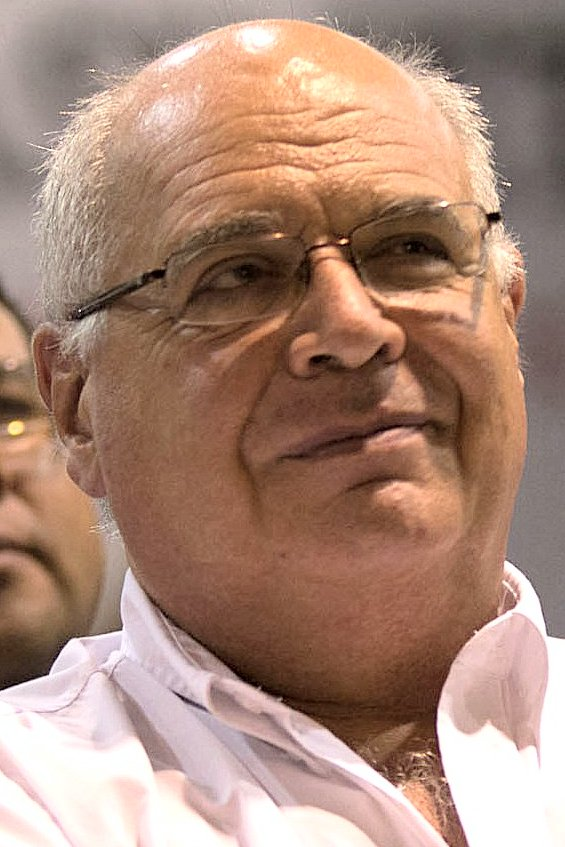

Member of the Barcelona City Council
- In office 17 June 2023 – 6 March 2026

Member of the Parliament of Catalonia
- In office 26 October 2015 – 17 January 2018
- Constituency: Barcelona

Personal details
- Born: Josep Lluís Franco Rabell; 17 February 1954 (age 72) Barcelona, Spain
- Party: Socialists' Party of Catalonia (since 2023)
- Other party: Revolutionary Workers' Party; United and Alternative Left; Revolta Global

Josep Lluís Franco Rabell (born 17 February 1954) is a Spanish activist and politician. He was candidate in the 2015 Catalan election for the Catalonia Yes We Can coalition, being MP between 2016 and 2018.
