= Elections in Spain =

Elections in Spain encompass four different types: general elections, regional elections, local elections, and elections to the European Parliament. General elections and regional elections are typically conducted at the conclusion of the national or regional legislative mandate, which usually spans four years since the previous election. However, early elections can be called in certain circumstances. On the other hand, local council elections (including municipal and insular elections) and elections to the European Parliament follow fixed dates, although some local government bodies, such as provincial councils, are not directly elected. In most elections, a party-list proportional representation (PR) system is employed, while the Senate utilizes the plurality system.

== General elections ==
Evolution of Spanish vote for Congress of Deputies from 1975 to 2019.

General elections are elections held for the national legislature, which is called in Spain Cortes Generales (Spanish for "General Courts") and consists of two chambers, the Congress of Deputies and the Senate. The Congress and Senate usually serve concurrent terms that run for a maximum of four years. However, the Monarch, on the advice of the Prime Minister, has the prerogative to dissolve both Houses at any given time either jointly or separately.

=== Congress of Deputies ===
The Congress is made out of 350 members directly elected by universal adult suffrage for a four-year term of office. Each one of Spain's fifty provinces is a constituency entitled to an initial minimum of two seats; the cities of Ceuta and Melilla elect one member each. The remaining 348 seats are allocated among the fifty provinces in proportion to their populations. Parties, federations, coalitions and agrupaciones de electores (electors' groups) may present candidates or lists of candidates. The lists are closed, so electors may not choose individual candidates in, or alter the order of, such lists. Electors cast a ballot for a single list, or for a single candidate in Ceuta and Melilla.

The seats in each constituency are apportioned according to the largest average method of proportional representation (PR), conceived by the Belgian mathematician Victor d'Hondt in 1899 (d'Hondt method). However, in order to participate in the allocation of seats, a list must receive at least three percent of all valid votes cast in the constituency, including blank ballots. The single-member seats in Ceuta and Melilla are filled by the plurality or first-past-the-post method, under which the candidate obtaining the largest number of votes in the constituency is elected.

Seat allocation in Congress

To illustrate the functioning of the system, the allocation of seats in the three provinces of the Self-Governing or Autonomous Community of Aragón - Huesca, Teruel and Zaragoza - for the June 1993 general election is presented here in detail. At the time, Zaragoza province had seven seats in Congress, while both Huesca and Teruel had three.

In Zaragoza province, only four tickets, namely the Spanish Socialist Workers Party (PSOE), the Popular Party (PP), the Aragonese Party (PAR) and the United Left (IU) won at least three percent of the valid votes cast in the election - including blank ballots - and were thus entitled to participate in the allocation of constituency seats. The tickets were sorted by number of votes from top to bottom, and the votes polled by each of these were then divided by 1, 2, 3, and so on until the number of seats to be allocated was reached, as detailed below:

Division	PSOE	PP	PAR	IU
1	**174,061**	**172,753**	**108,690**	**60,074**
2	**87,030**	**86,376**	54,345	30,037
3	**58,020**	57,584	36,230	20,024
4	43,515	43,188	27,172	15,018
5	34,812	34,550	21,738	12,014
6	29,010	28,792	18,115	10,012
7	24,865	24,679	15,527	8,582
Seats	3	2	1	1

Seats were then awarded to the tickets obtaining the largest quotients or averages (shown in bold). As indicated, the PSOE won three seats, the PP two, the PAR one and IU one. The seats won by each ticket were awarded to the candidates included therein, according to their ranking on the lists: therefore, the first three candidates on the PSOE list were elected to Congress, as were the first two candidates on the PP list and the candidates at the top of the PAR and IU lists, respectively.

Meanwhile, the results of the election in Huesca province were as follows:

Division	PSOE	PP	PAR	IU
1	**50,720**	**43,059**	23,784	9,756
2	**25,360**	21,529	11,892	4,878
3	16,906	14,353	7,928	3,252
Seats	2	1	0	0

The effective representation threshold in Huesca was 25,360 votes, or 19.0% of the valid vote.

Finally, the outcome of the election in Teruel was the following:

Division	PSOE	PP	PAR	IU
1	**36,327**	**34,293**	12,070	3,990
2	**18,163**	17,146	6,035	1,995
3	12,109	11,431	4,023	1,330
Seats	2	1	0	0

The effective representation threshold in Teruel was 18,163 votes, or 20.2% of the valid vote.

Having concluded the allocation of Congress seats in the three Aragón constituencies, the following peculiarities stand out:

1. The effective representation threshold in each province was substantially larger than the three percent barrier set forth by law: in all three constituencies, the seat apportionment would have been the same regardless of the statutory threshold.
2. The number of votes required to attain a seat in Zaragoza province - the largest of three constituencies - was substantially higher than the amount required to that end in Huesca or in Teruel.
3. The proportional allocation of seats in each constituency appeared to favor the major parties in general and specifically the majority party.

=== Senate ===
The system for electing the Senate was first used in 1979, though with regard to the provinces the system is unchanged since 1977. Senators are elected directly from the provinces and indirectly from the autonomous communities; currently, there are 264 senators, 208 directly elected and 56 indirectly elected.

In the provinces, a majoritarian partial block voting system is used. All peninsular provinces elect four senators each; the insular provinces (Balearic and Canary Islands) elect one or three senators per island, and Ceuta and Melilla elect two senators each. Parties nominate three candidates; each voter has three votes (fewer in those constituencies electing fewer senators) and votes for candidates by name, the only instance of personal voting in Spanish national elections. The usual outcome is three senators for the party with the most votes, and one senator for the runner-up, except in very close races.

The autonomous communities receive one senator, plus one for each million inhabitants. They are entitled to determine how they choose their senators but are generally elected by the legislature of the respective community in proportion to its party composition.

=== Election results 1977–2023 ===
Summary of Spanish elections for the Congress of Deputies, 1977–2023
Election	UCD (Note: Dissolved in 1983.)	PSOE	PP (Note: AP 1977, CD 1979, AP–PDP 1982, CP 1986.)	IU (Note: PCE 1977–1982.)	CDC (Note: PDC 1977, CiU 1979–2011, DiL 2015, JxCat–Junts 2019, Junts 2023.)	PNV	ERC (Note: EC–FED 1977, ERC–CatSí 2011–2016, ERC–Sobiranistes 2019.)	BNG (Note: BNPG 1977–1979, Galician Nationalist Bloc–Galician Socialist Party 1982, Nós 2015–2016.)	EHB (Note: ESB-PSV 1977, HB 1979–1996, EH 2000, Amaiur 2011, EH Bildu 2015–2019.)	CDS (Note: Merged into PP in 2006, dissenters founded CDL which was merged into Cs in 2014.)	CC (Note: AIC 1986–1989, CC–PNC 2008–2019.)	UPyD	Cs	Com.	Pod. (Note: Unidos Podemos 2015–2016, Unidas Podemos 2019.)	Vox	MP	Sumar
1977	**34.4**	29.3	8.3	9.3	2.8	1.7	0.8	0.1	0.2									
1979	**34.8**	30.4	6.1	10.8	1.7	1.6	0.7	0.3	1.0									
1982	6.8	**48.1**	26.4	4.0	3.7	1.9	0.7	0.2	1.0	2.9								
1986	Dissolved	**44.1**	26.0	4.6	5.0	1.5	0.4	0.1	1.1	9.2	0.3							
1989	Dissolved	**39.6**	25.8	9.1	5.0	1.2	0.4	0.2	1.1	7.9	0.3							
1993	Dissolved	**38.8**	34.8	9.6	4.9	1.2	0.8	0.5	0.9	1.8	0.9							
1996	Dissolved	37.6	**38.8**	10.5	4.6	1.3	0.7	0.9	0.7	0.2	0.9							
2000	Dissolved	34.2	**44.5**	5.4	4.2	1.5	0.8	1.3	Boycotted	0.1	1.1							
2004	Dissolved	**42.6**	37.7	5.0	3.2	1.6	2.5	0.8	Banned	0.1	0.9							
2008	Dissolved	**43.9**	39.9	3.8	3.0	1.2	1.2	0.8	Banned	0.0	0.7	1.2	0.2					
2011	Dissolved	28.8	**44.6**	6.9	4.2	1.3	1.1	0.8	1.4	Dissolved	0.6	4.7	DNR	0.5				
2015	Dissolved	22.0	**28.7**	3.7	2.2	1.2	2.4	0.3	0.9	Dissolved	0.3	0.6	13.9	(Note: Within Unidos Podemos.)	20.7	0.2		
2016	Dissolved	22.6	**33.0**		2.0	1.2	2.6	0.2	0.8	Dissolved	0.3	0.2	13.1		21.2	0.2		
Apr. 2019	Dissolved	**28.7**	16.7	(Note: Within Unidas Podemos.)	1.9	1.5	3.9	0.4	1.0	Dissolved	0.5	DNR	15.9	0.7	14.3	10.3		
Nov. 2019	Dissolved	**28.0**	20.8		2.2	1.6	3.6	0.5	1.2	Dissolved	0.5	(Note: Within Ciudadanos.)	6.8	(Note: Within Más País.)	12.9	15.1	2.4	
2023	Dissolved	31.7	**33.1**	(Note: Within Sumar.)	1.6	1.1	1.9	0.6	1.4	Dissolved	0.5	Dissolved	DNR			12.4		12.3

== Regional elections ==
- 1983 Spanish regional elections
- 1987 Spanish regional elections
- 1991 Spanish regional elections
- 1995 Spanish regional elections
- 1999 Spanish regional elections
- 2003 Spanish regional elections
- 2007 Spanish regional elections
- 2011 Spanish regional elections
- 2015 Spanish regional elections
- 2019 Spanish regional elections
- 2020 Spanish regional elections
- 2021 Spanish regional elections
- 2022 Spanish regional elections
- 2023 Spanish regional elections

Elections to the unicameral parliaments of the autonomous communities of Spain are held every four years. Most of the seventeen autonomous parliaments elections take place the same day, the fourth Sunday of May of the year before a leap year; the last election was held on 28 May 2023. Despite this, not all the regions celebrate elections at the same time due to the power of the regional presidents to call early elections if necessary.

Depending on the autonomy statute of each nationality or region, the regional president has a greater or lesser number of conditions for calling early elections. Regional elections are held in all nationalities, regions, and cities, fifty-four days after the publication of their announcement in the Official State Gazette and in the official gazette of the corresponding autonomous community.

There are currently two groups of autonomous communities: those that must hold elections on the fourth Sunday in May every four years—counting from May 1983—and those that do not have this obligation. Although all communities in both groups may bring forward elections, in the case of those in the first group that hold early elections, the new legislatures are limited by the natural term of the original legislature, so that in any case there will be elections in May of each four-year period.

The six autonomous communities required to hold elections on the fourth Sunday in May of each four-year period are Asturias, Cantabria, Castilla-La Mancha, La Rioja, the Community of Madrid, and the Region of Murcia. So far, only in Asturias (in 2012) and Madrid (in 2021) have elections been brought forward, resulting in shorter legislatures for that period.

The other autonomous communities, namely Andalusia, Aragon, the Balearic Islands, the Canary Islands, Castile and León, Catalonia, the Valencian Community, Extremadura, Galicia, Navarre, and the Basque Country, may bring forward elections, resulting in a full legislative term. Despite this, only six communities – Extremadura in 2025; Andalusia in 1996, 2015 and 2018; Castile and León in 2022; the Basque Country in 1986, 2001 and 2012; Catalonia in 1995, 2006, 2012, 2015, 2017 and 2024; Galicia in 2009, 2012, 2020 and 2024; and the Valencian Community in 2019, have brought forward elections under this new system. The others – namely Aragon, the Balearic Islands, the Canary Islands, Navarre, and the Valencian Community since 2023 – continue to hold them jointly with the elections of the autonomous communities not authorized to bring them forward.

== Local elections ==
- 1979 Spanish local elections
- 1983 Spanish local elections
- 1987 Spanish local elections
- 1991 Spanish local elections
- 1995 Spanish local elections
- 1999 Spanish local elections
- 2003 Spanish local elections
- 2007 Spanish local elections
- 2011 Spanish local elections
- 2015 Spanish local elections
- 2019 Spanish local elections
- 2023 Spanish local elections

Elections in the municipalities take place in all the country in the same day as the regional elections, the fourth Sunday of May of the year before a leap year. Last time was 28 May 2023.

== Elections to the European Parliament ==
- 1987 European Parliament election in Spain
- 1989 European Parliament election in Spain
- 1994 European Parliament election in Spain
- 1999 European Parliament election in Spain
- 2004 European Parliament election in Spain
- 2009 European Parliament election in Spain
- 2014 European Parliament election in Spain
- 2019 European Parliament election in Spain
- 2024 European Parliament election in Spain

== Referendums ==
- 1976 Spanish political reform referendum
- 1978 Spanish constitutional referendum
- 1986 Spanish NATO membership referendum
- 2005 Spanish European Constitution referendum

== Electoral procedures ==
The norms regulating the conduct and administration of elections are laid out in detail in the Organic Law 5/1985, of June 19, on the General Electoral Regime. Under this law, the elections are supervised by the Junta Electoral Central (Spanish: Central Electoral Commission), a permanent body composed of eight Supreme Court judges and five political scientists or sociologists appointed by the Congress of Deputies. The Electoral Commission is supported in its work by the Ministry of the Interior. On election day, polling stations are run by electoral boards which consist of groups of citizens selected by lottery.

The format of the ballot paper is designed by the Spanish central government, however, the law allows political parties to produce and distribute their own ballot papers, either by mailing them to voters or by other means such as street distribution, provided that they comply with the official model. The government then covers the cost of all printed ballot papers. These must then be marked by voters, either in the polling station or outside the polling station and placed inside sealed envelopes which are then placed inside ballot boxes in the polling station. Following the close of polls, the ballots are then counted in each individual polling station in the presence of representatives of the political parties and candidates. The ballots are then immediately destroyed, with the exception of those considered invalid or challenged by the candidates' representatives, which are retained for further scrutiny. The result is that full recounts are impossible.

== See also ==
- Censorship in Spain
- Electoral calendar
- Electoral system
- Local government in Spain
- Encasillado
