= 2022 Spanish regional elections =

| ← 2021 | 13 February 2022; 19 June 2022 | 2023 → |

190 seats in the regional parliaments of Andalusia and Castile and León
Regional administrations by leading party in 2022
National parties
PSOE (9)
PP (5+1)
INDEP (0+1)
Regional parties
ERC (1)
EAJ/PNV (1)
PRC (1)

Regional elections were held in Spain during 2022 to elect the regional parliaments of two of the seventeen autonomous communities: Andalusia and Castile and León. 190 of 1,212 seats in the regional parliaments were up for election. The elections were held on 13 February in Castile and León, and on 19 June in Andalusia.

== Election date ==
Determination of election day varied depending on the autonomous community. Typically, most autonomous communities held their elections on the fourth Sunday of May every four years, concurrently with nationwide local elections, while others had their own, separate electoral cycles. In some cases, regional presidents had the prerogative to dissolve parliament and call for extra elections at a different time, but newly elected assemblies were restricted to serving out what remained of their previous four year-terms without altering the period to their next ordinary election. In other cases—Andalusia (since 1994), Aragon (2007), the Balearic Islands (2007), the Basque Country (1981), the Canary Islands (2018), Castile and León (2007), Catalonia (1985), Extremadura (2011), Galicia (1985), Navarre (2010) and the Valencian Community (2006)—the law granted regional presidents the power to call snap elections resulting in fresh four-year parliamentary terms.

== Regional governments ==
The following table lists party control in autonomous communities and cities. Gains for a party are highlighted in that party's colour.

| Election day | Region | Previous control | New control |
|---|---|---|---|
| 13 February | Castile and León | People's Party (PP) | People's Party (PP) |
| 19 June | Andalusia | People's Party (PP) | People's Party (PP) |

== Summary by region ==
=== February (Castile and León) ===
| Parties and alliances | Votes | % | ±pp | Seats | +/− |
|---|---|---|---|---|---|
| PP | 382,157 | 31.40 | −0.10 | 31 | +2 |
| PSOE | 365,434 | 30.02 | −4.82 | 28 | −7 |
| Vox | 214,668 | 17.64 | +12.14 | 13 | +12 |
| Podemos–IU–AV | 62,138 | 5.11 | −2.18 | 1 | −1 |
| Cs | 54,721 | 4.50 | −10.44 | 1 | −11 |
| UPL | 52,098 | 4.28 | +2.24 | 3 | +2 |
| EV–SY | 39,040 | 3.21 | New | 3 | +3 |
| XAV | 13,875 | 1.14 | +0.45 | 1 | ±0 |
| Others | 20,863 | 1.71 | | 0 | ±0 |
| Blank ballots | 12,170 | 1.00 | –0.06 | | |
| Valid votes | 1,217,164 | 98.91 | –0.10 | | |
| Invalid votes | 13,435 | 1.09 | +0.10 | | |
| Votes cast / turnout | 1,230,599 | 58.75 | –7.05 | | |
| Registered voters | 2,094,623 | | | | |

=== June (Andalusia) ===
| Parties and alliances | Votes | % | ±pp | Seats | +/− |
|---|---|---|---|---|---|
| PP | 1,589,272 | 43.11 | +22.36 | 58 | +32 |
| PSOE–A | 888,325 | 24.10 | −3.84 | 30 | −3 |
| Vox | 496,618 | 13.47 | +2.51 | 14 | +2 |
| PorA | 284,027 | 7.70 | n/a | 5 | ±0 |
| AA | 168,960 | 4.58 | n/a | 2 | −10 |
| Cs | 121,567 | 3.30 | −14.98 | 0 | −21 |
| Others | 100,684 | 2.73 | | 0 | ±0 |
| Blank ballots | 36,924 | 1.00 | –0.57 | | |
| Valid votes | 3,686,377 | 98.88 | +1.08 | | |
| Invalid votes | 41,778 | 1.12 | –1.08 | | |
| Votes cast / turnout | 3,728,155 | 56.13 | –0.43 | | |
| Registered voters | 6,641,903 | | | | |

== Bibliography ==
- Ley Orgánica 5/1985, de 19 de junio, del Régimen Electoral General (Organic Law 5/1985). Official State Gazette (in Spanish). 19 June 1985 [version as of 7 July 2021]. BOE-A-1985-11672.
