= 2021 Spanish regional elections =

← 2020	14 February 2021; 4 May 2021	2022 →

271 seats in the regional parliaments of Catalonia and Madrid
Regional administrations by leading party in 2021
National parties
PSOE (9)
PP (5+1)
INDEP (Note: In April 2021, Mayor-President of Melilla Eduardo de Castro was expelled from Citizens (Cs), but remained at the helm of the local government.) (0+1)
Regional parties
ERC (1)
EAJ/PNV (1)
PRC (1)

Regional elections were held in Spain during 2021 to elect the regional parliaments of two of the seventeen autonomous communities: Catalonia and Madrid. 271 of 1,212 seats in the regional parliaments were up for election. The elections were held on 14 February in Catalonia, and on 4 May in Madrid.

== Election date ==
Determination of election day varied depending on the autonomous community. Typically, most autonomous communities held their elections on the fourth Sunday of May every four years, concurrently with nationwide local elections, while others had their own, separate electoral cycles. In some cases, regional presidents had the prerogative to dissolve parliament and call for extra elections at a different time, but newly elected assemblies were restricted to serving out what remained of their previous four year-terms without altering the period to their next ordinary election. In other cases—Andalusia (since 1994), Aragon (2007), the Balearic Islands (2007), the Basque Country (1981), the Canary Islands (2018), Castile and León (2007), Catalonia (1985), Extremadura (2011), Galicia (1985), Navarre (2010) and the Valencian Community (2006)—the law granted regional presidents the power to call snap elections resulting in fresh four-year parliamentary terms.

== Regional governments ==
The following table lists party control in autonomous communities and cities. Gains for a party are highlighted in that party's colour.

Election day	Region	Previous control	New control
14 February	Catalonia	Together for Catalonia (JxCat)	Republican Left of Catalonia (ERC)
4 May	Madrid	People's Party (PP)	People's Party (PP)

== Summary by region ==
=== February (Catalonia) ===
Parties and alliances	Votes	%	±pp	Seats	+/−
PSC–PSOE	654,766	23.03	+9.17	33	+16
ERC	605,581	21.30	−0.08	33	+1
JxCat	570,539	20.07	n/a	32	+12
Vox	218,121	7.67	New	11	+11
ECP–PEC	195,345	6.87	−0.59	8	±0
CUP–G	189,924	6.68	+2.22	9	+5
Cs	158,606	5.58	−19.77	6	−30
PP	109,453	3.85	−0.39	3	−1
PDeCAT	77,229	2.72	n/a	0	−14
Others	39,764	1.40		0	±0
Blank ballots	24,087	0.85	+0.41		
Valid votes	2,843,415	98.56	–1.07		
Invalid votes	41,430	1.41	+1.07		
Votes cast / turnout	2,884,845	51.29	–27.80		
Registered voters	5,624,067				

=== May (Madrid) ===
Parties and alliances	Votes	%	±pp	Seats	+/−
PP	1,631,608	44.76	+22.53	65	+35
Más Madrid	619,215	16.99	+2.30	24	+4
PSOE	612,622	16.80	−10.51	24	−13
Vox	333,403	9.15	+0.27	13	+1
Podemos–IU	263,871	7.24	+1.64	10	+3
Cs	130,237	3.57	−15.89	0	−26
Others	35,334	0.97		0	±0
Blank ballots	19,269	0.53	+0.07		
Valid votes	3,645,559	99.39	–0.19		
Invalid votes	22,247	0.61	+0.19		
Votes cast / turnout	3,667,806	71.74	+7.47		
Registered voters	5,112,813				

== Bibliography ==
- Ley Orgánica 5/1985, de 19 de junio, del Régimen Electoral General (Organic Law 5/1985). Official State Gazette (in Spanish). 19 June 1985 [version as of 25 June 2019]. BOE-A-1985-11672.
