= 2015 Catalan regional election =

Election in the Spanish region of Catalonia

- 27 September 2015

All 135 seats in the Parliament of Catalonia 68 seats needed for a majority
- Opinion polls
- Registered: 5,510,853 ▲1.8%
- Turnout: 4,130,196 (75.0%) ▲7.2 pp
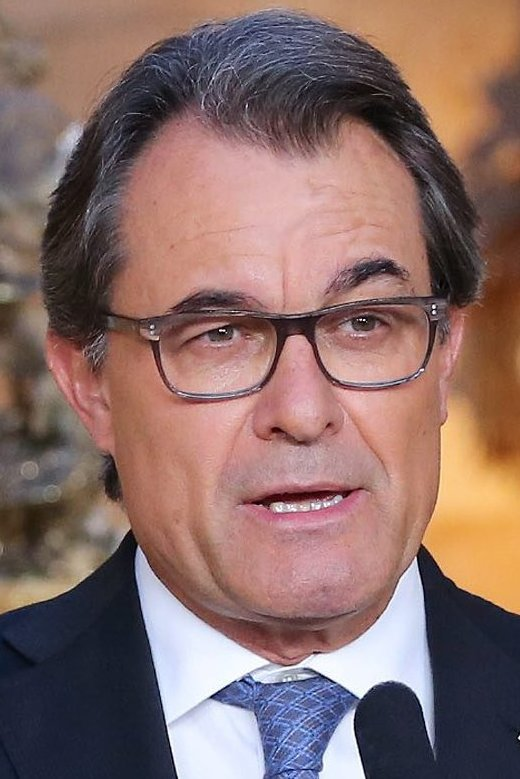

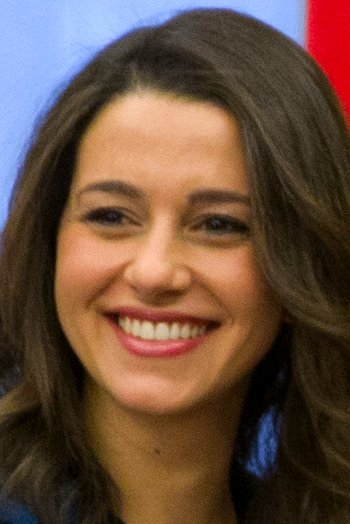

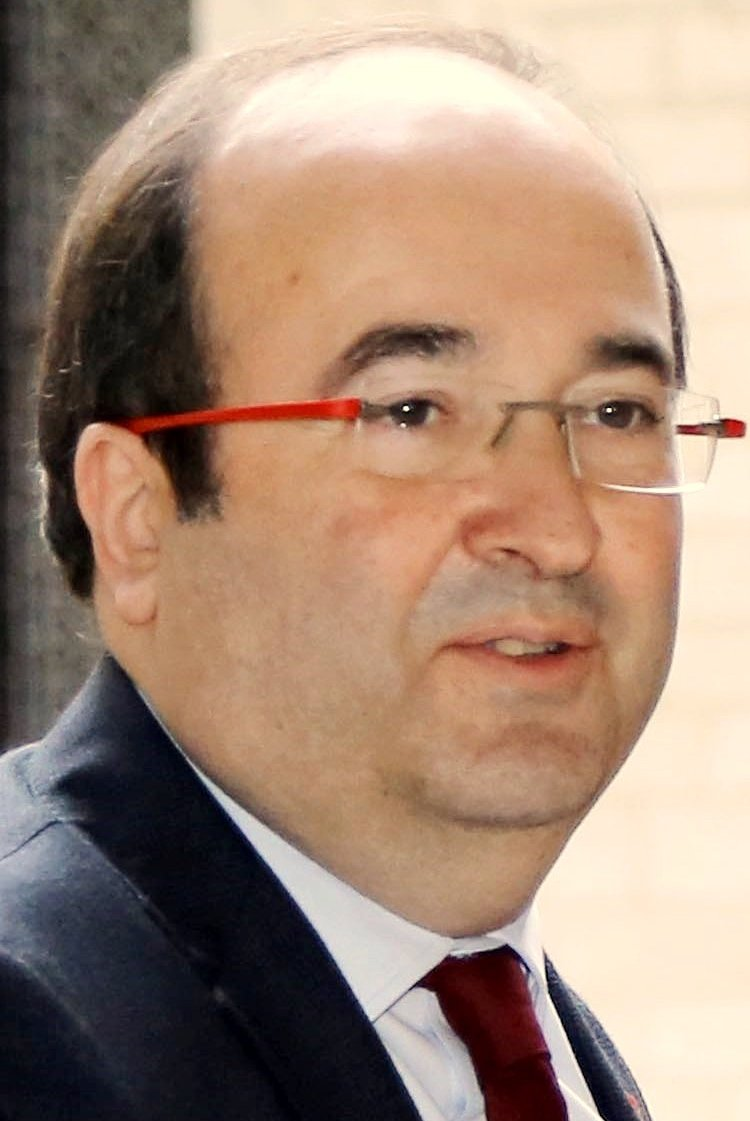

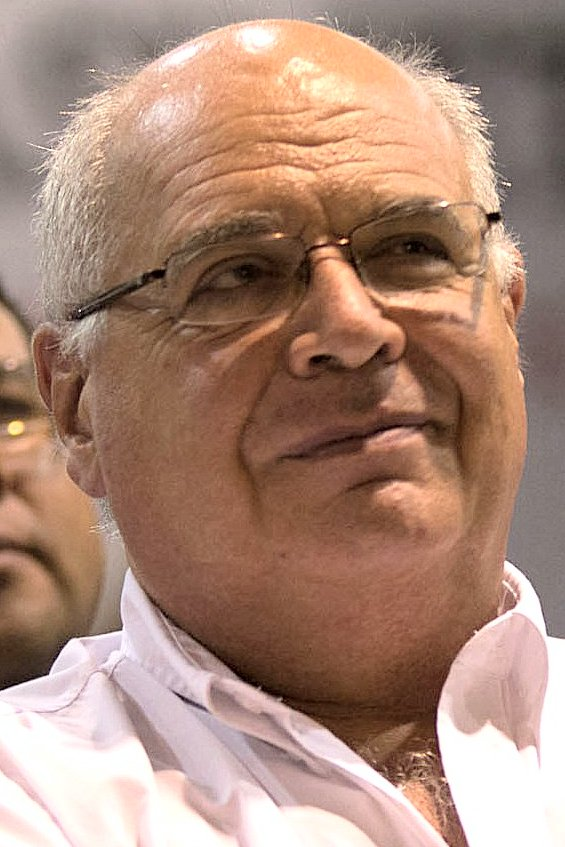

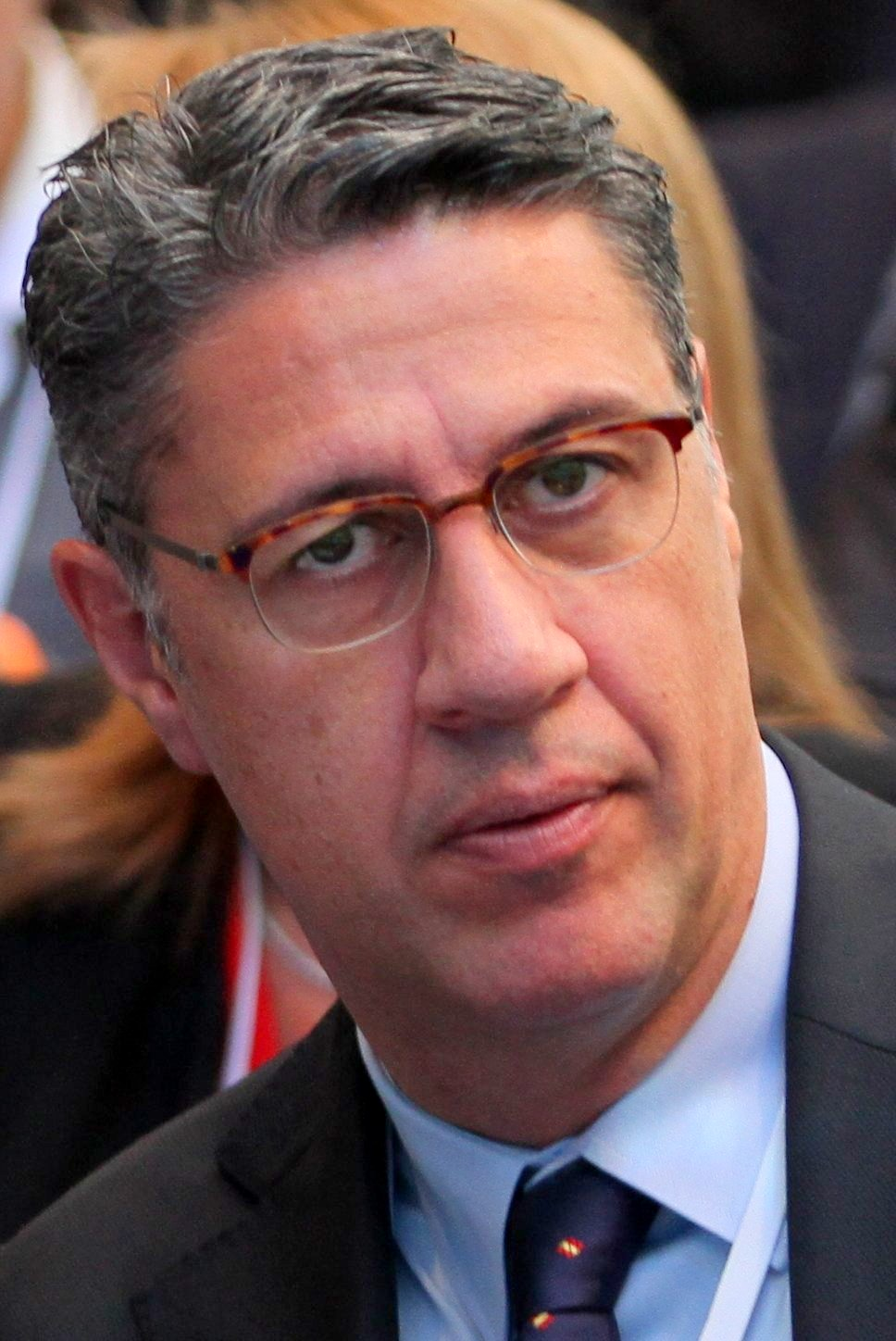

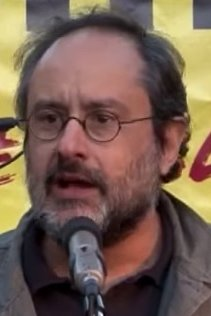
	First party	Second party	Third party
Leader	Artur Mas	Inés Arrimadas	Miquel Iceta
Party	JxSí	C's	PSC–PSOE
Leader since	15 July 2015	3 July 2015	19 July 2014
Leader's seat	Barcelona	Barcelona	Barcelona
Last election	71 seats, 44.4% (Note: Results for CiU (30.7%, 50 seats) and ERC–CatSí (13.7%, 21 seats) in the 2012 election.)	9 seats, 7.6%	20 seats, 14.4%
Seats won	62	25	16
Seat change	▼9	▲16	▼4
Popular vote	1,628,714	736,364	523,283
Percentage	39.6%	17.9%	12.7%
Swing	▼4.8 pp	▲10.3 pp	▼1.7 pp
	Fourth party	Fifth party	Sixth party
Leader	Lluís Rabell	Xavier García Albiol	Antonio Baños
Party	CatSíqueesPot	PP	CUP
Leader since	23 July 2015	28 July 2015	30 July 2015
Leader's seat	Barcelona	Barcelona	Barcelona
Last election	13 seats, 9.9% (Note: Results for ICV–EUiA in the 2012 election.)	19 seats, 13.0%	3 seats, 3.5%
Seats won	11	11	10
Seat change	▼2	▼8	▲7
Popular vote	367,613	349,193	337,794
Percentage	8.9%	8.5%	8.2%
Swing	▼1.0 pp	▼4.5 pp	▲4.7 pp
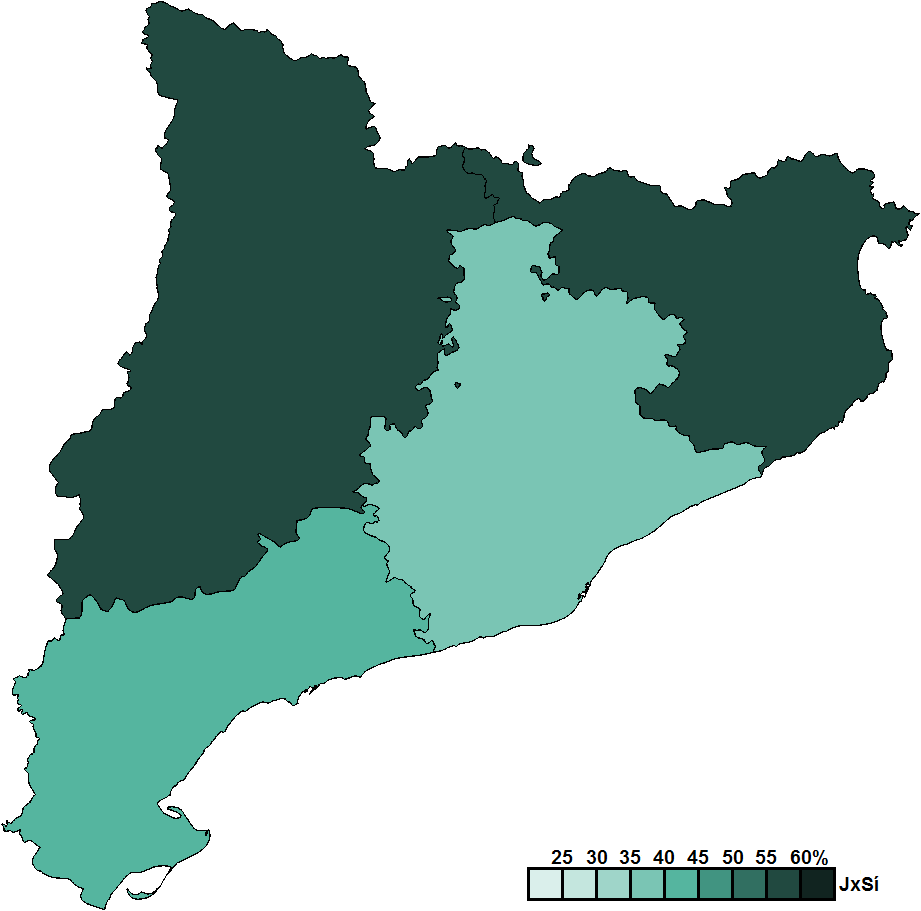
President before election
Artur Mas
CDC
President after election
Carles Puigdemont
CDC (JxSí)

A regional election was held in Catalonia on 27 September 2015, electing the 11th Parliament of the autonomous community. All 135 seats in the Parliament were up for election. This was the third regional Catalan election in only five years, after the 2010 and 2012 elections and the first one in over 37 years in which Democratic Convergence of Catalonia (CDC) and Democratic Union of Catalonia (UDC) ran separately, after the dissolution of Convergence and Union (CiU) in June 2015 over disagreements on the coalition's separatist turn.

The plan to hold a snap election in 2015 was announced on 14 January by President Artur Mas. After the non-binding 2014 independence referendum, Mas declared that the election was to be turned into an alternative vote on independence, with pro-independence parties including the independence goal in their election manifestos. As part of the process, CDC, along with Republican Left of Catalonia (ERC), Democrats of Catalonia (DC) and Left Movement (MES) would run together under the Junts pel Sí (JxSí) platform, with support from members of the pro-independence Catalan National Assembly (ANC), Òmnium and the Municipalities' Association for Independence (AMI). The alliance, however, failed to achieve its self-stated goal to attain an absolute majority on its own.

Newly formed Podemos (Spanish for "We can"), Initiative for Catalonia Greens (ICV), United and Alternative Left (EUiA) and Equo stood together under the Catalunya Sí que es Pot (Catalan for "Catalonia yes we can") label, a second novel electoral grouping formed for this election. The alliance was modeled after the Barcelona en Comú platform that won the 2015 Barcelona election, but it failed to garner the decisive support of the city's popular mayor Ada Colau and saw a poor performance. Citizens (C's) benefited from its anti-independence stance and climbed to second place ahead of a declining Socialists' Party of Catalonia (PSC), which scored a new historical low for the third election in a row. The People's Party (PP) suffered from its national counterpart decline and scored its worst result since 1992, whereas the left-wing Popular Unity Candidacy (CUP) saw a strong performance which allowed it to hold the key to government formation with JxSí.

== Background ==
=== Secessionist process ===
After the 2012 regional election resulted in Convergence and Union (CiU) unexpectedly losing seats, President Mas was placed in a difficult political position, as he fell 18 seats short of the absolute majority. He was forced to sign an agreement with Republican Left of Catalonia (ERC), in which the latter pledged to support the government, albeit without entering a formal coalition, in return for a faster process to obtain the independence of Catalonia.

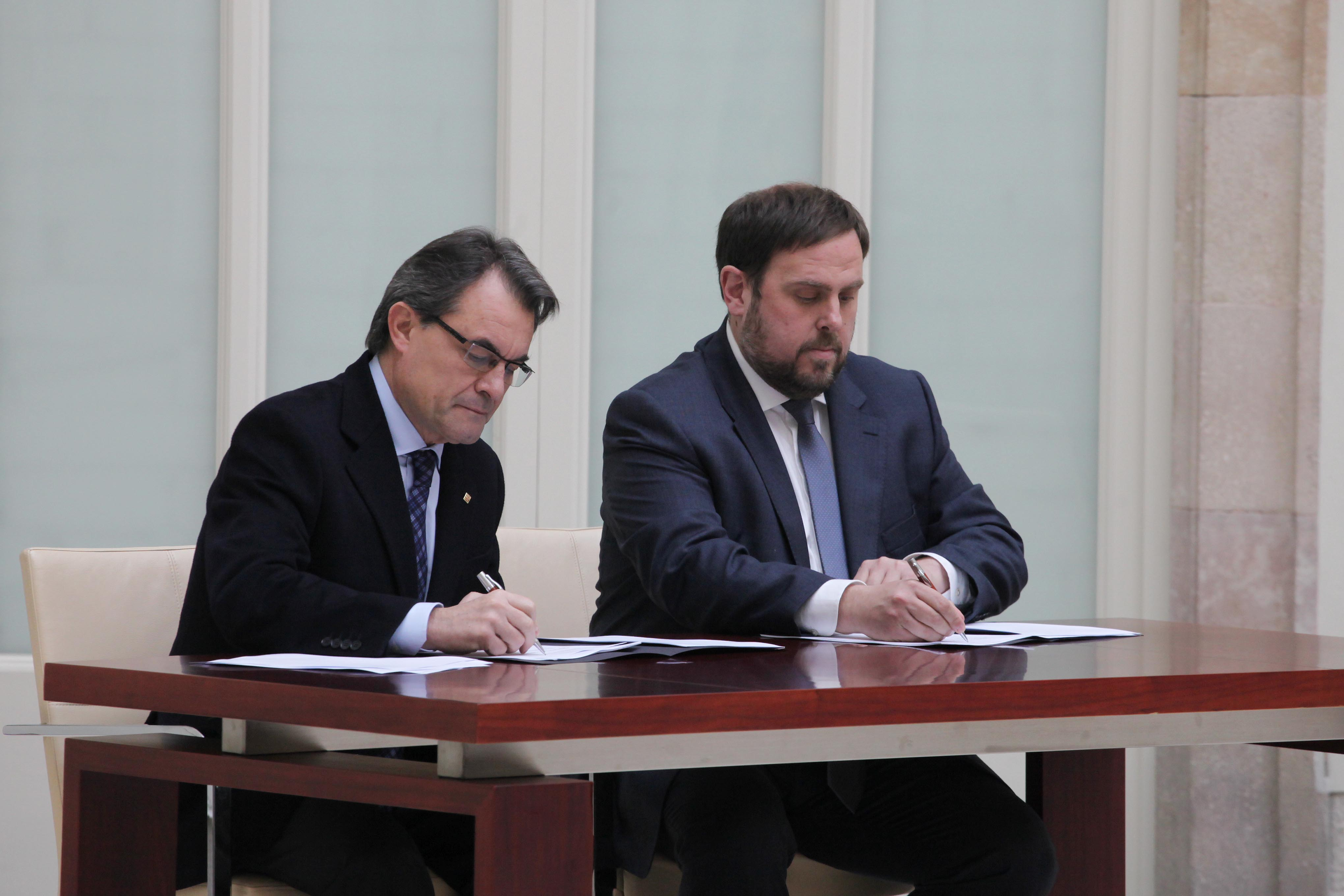
Catalan president Artur Mas and ERC leader Oriol Junqueras, signing the government agreement on 19 December 2012.

On 23 January 2013, the Parliament of Catalonia adopted the Declaration of Sovereignty and of the Right to Decide of the Catalan People, which stated that "The people of Catalonia have—by reason of democratic legitimacy—the character of a sovereign political and legal entity." This declaration was provisionally suspended by the Constitutional Court of Spain on 8 May 2013, and on 25 March 2014 the same court declared that it was void and unconstitutional due to the fact that the Spanish Constitution of 1978 makes the Spanish people as a whole the only subject of sovereignty. At the same time, opinion polls began to show ERC topping the voters' preferences for the first time since the 1932 Catalan election, with the CiU vote declining as a result of the 2012 election backlash, but also because of Mas' management of the economic crisis and the involvement of several CiU leading figures in several corruption scandals. Among those involved was party founder Jordi Pujol, charged in a tax fraud scandal related to an undeclared inheritance in Andorra, accompanied by allegations of bribery, embezzlement, breach of trust, influence peddling, forgery of documents and money laundering crimes allegedly committed during his time as president of Catalonia.

On 12 December 2013, the Government of Catalonia announced that a non-binding referendum on the independence issue would be held on 9 November 2014, for the purpose of giving independence leaders a political mandate to negotiate with the Government of Spain. Mariano Rajoy's government stated shortly after its intention to block such a referendum, which it considered unconstitutional and not within the competences of the Autonomous Community.

In spite of this, a not legally sanctioned referendum was held as scheduled, with over 80% voting for independence, albeit on a low turnout of around 40%. Independence parties considered the result a success. Artur Mas explained in a public act on 25 November his plan to reach independence, proposing calling an extraordinary regional election—turned into an alternative vote on independence—at some point during 2015, on the condition that ERC agreed to join a common list with his party to stand together at the polls. ERC leader Oriol Junqueras agreed with most of the plan but initially refused such a joint list, threatening to break its government pact with CiU in order to force an election in early 2015. After weeks of calibrated brinkmanship from both sides, with CDC pushing for a joint candidature to cover for its forecasted loss of support and ERC refusing to run with Artur Mas as presidential candidate, both parties finally reached an agreement, and on 14 January 2015, Mas announced that a snap regional election would be held on 27 September that same year, with the intention to turn in into the true plebiscite on independence.

Aside from the pact to hold an extraordinary election, the agreement also included to complete state structures as a basic element to culminate the process of "national transition" as well as negotiation of budgets. Mas and Junqueras also apologized for the rarefied political climate between the pro-independence parties in the negotiations that had taken place during the weeks prior to the announcement.

The Spanish government, in response to the election announcement eight months ahead of the scheduled date, accused Mas of having "no interest in attending the Catalan people's problems, nor it has any capacity to solve them". The People's Party (PP), Spanish Socialist Workers' Party (PSOE) and Union, Progress and Democracy (UPyD) also criticized the announcement.

=== CiU breakup ===
Tension within both parties forming the CiU federation had reached an all-time high in June 2015 due to differences between the positions the Democratic Union of Catalonia (UDC) leadership and Democratic Convergence of Catalonia (CDC) leader Artur Mas took over the sovereignty process. CDC was in favour of outright independence even if it meant breaking the established Spanish legality, while UDC was against doing it without a successful negotiation with the Spanish Government. As a result, a vote was held on 14 June 2015 between UDC members, asking whether the party should commit itself to continue with the process but establishing several conditions—including not violating the legality in force through unilateral independence declarations—or starting the constituent processes at the margin of legal norms. The first option, supported by UDC leaders and contrary to the signed agreements between CDC, ERC and sovereignty entities, was approved by UDC members with a narrow 50.9% to 46.1% choosing to stand at the side of CDC. After this, CDC issued an ultimatum to UDC for the latter to decide within "two or three days" whether it committed itself to the independence plan. On 17 June, after a meeting of the UDC leadership, it was announced that the party was withdrawing all three of its members from the Government of the Generalitat of Catalonia, although they agreed to maintain parliamentary stability until the end of the legislature. That same day at night, the CDC national executive committee met and in a press conference the next day confirmed that UDC and CDC would not run together in the 2015 regional election, and that the political project of the CiU federation was over, signalling the end of 37 years of cooperation between both parties as Convergence and Union, a coalition which had dominated Catalan politics since the 1980s.

=== Run up to election ===
On 3 August 2015, Catalan president Artur Mas signed the election decree and highlighted the extraordinariness of the proposal's background, which nonetheless did not mention the word plebiscite. The President justified the extraordinary meaning of the election after having unsuccessfully tried to negotiate a legal and agreed-to referendum with the Government of Spain. Mas, however, did not mention how much support did he considered necessary for proceeding with the independence process. Only pro-independence parties recognized the plebiscitary character of the election, with other parties arguing that—acknowledging the election's importance—it still was an election to the Parliament of Catalonia as many others had been held in the past. The PP, PSC and C's, however, hinted on the possibility of a post-election pact to curb the independence process. The Spanish Government said it would keep a close watch closely the legality of the whole election process while demanding neutrality from Mas. Mariano Rajoy stated: "There won't be a plebiscitary election, as there wasn't a referendum", in relation to the 9 November 2014 vote. Several parties and media questioned the legality of holding the Free Way demonstration on 11 September, as it coincided with the start date of the election campaign.

== Overview ==
Under the 2006 Statute of Autonomy, the Parliament of Catalonia was the unicameral legislature of the homonymous autonomous community, having legislative power in devolved matters, as well as the ability to grant or withdraw confidence from a regional president. The electoral and procedural rules were supplemented by national law provisions.

=== Date ===
The term of the Parliament of Catalonia expired four years after the date of its previous election, unless it was dissolved earlier. The election was required to be called no later than 15 days before the scheduled expiration date of parliament, with election day taking place between 40 and 60 days from the call. The previous election was held on 25 November 2012, which meant that the chamber's term would have expired on 25 November 2016. The election was required to be called no later than 10 November 2016, setting the latest possible date for election day on 9 January 2017.

The regional president had the prerogative to dissolve the Parliament of Catalonia at any given time and call a snap election, provided that no motion of no confidence was in process and that dissolution did not occur before one year after a previous one under this procedure. In the event of an investiture process failing to elect a regional president within a two-month period from the first ballot, the Parliament was to be automatically dissolved and a fresh election called.

The Parliament of Catalonia was officially dissolved on 4 August 2015 with the publication of the corresponding decree in the Official Journal of the Government of Catalonia (DOGC), setting election day for 27 September.

=== Electoral system ===
Voting for the Parliament was based on universal suffrage, comprising all Spanish nationals over 18 years of age, registered in Catalonia and with full political rights, provided that they had not been deprived of the right to vote by a final sentence, nor were legally incapacitated. Additionally, non-resident citizens were required to apply for voting, a system known as "begged" voting (Spanish: Voto rogado).

The Parliament of Catalonia had a minimum of 100 and a maximum of 150 seats, with electoral provisions fixing its size at 135. All were elected in four multi-member constituencies—corresponding to the provinces of Barcelona, Girona, Lleida and Tarragona, each of which was assigned a fixed number of seats—using the D'Hondt method and closed-list proportional voting, with a three percent-threshold of valid votes (including blank ballots) in each constituency. The use of this electoral method resulted in a higher effective threshold depending on district magnitude and vote distribution.

As a result of the aforementioned allocation, each Parliament constituency was entitled the following seats:

Seats	Constituencies
85	Barcelona
18	Tarragona
17	Girona
15	Lleida

The law did not provide for by-elections to fill vacant seats; instead, any vacancies arising after the proclamation of candidates and during the legislative term were filled by the next candidates on the party lists or, when required, by designated substitutes.

=== Outgoing parliament ===
The table below shows the composition of the parliamentary groups in the chamber at the time of dissolution.

Parliamentary composition in August 2015
Groups	Parties	Legislators	
Groups	Parties	Seats	Total
Convergence and Union's Parliamentary Group	CDC	34	50
Convergence and Union's Parliamentary Group	UDC	10	50
Convergence and Union's Parliamentary Group	DC	6	50
Republican Left of Catalonia's Parliamentary Group	ERC	19	21
Republican Left of Catalonia's Parliamentary Group	CatSí	2	21
Socialist Parliamentary Group	PSC	19	19
People's Party of Catalonia's Parliamentary Group	PP	19	19
Initiative for Catalonia Greens–United and Alternative Left's Parliamentary Group	ICV	10	13
Initiative for Catalonia Greens–United and Alternative Left's Parliamentary Group	EUiA	3	13
Citizens's Parliamentary Group	Cs	9	9
Mixed Group	CUP	3	3
Non-Inscrits	MES	1 (Note: Marina Geli, former PSC legislator.)	1

== Parties and candidates ==
The electoral law allowed for parties and federations registered in the interior ministry, alliances and groupings of electors to present lists of candidates. Parties and federations intending to form an alliance were required to inform the relevant electoral commission within 10 days of the election call, whereas groupings of electors needed to secure the signature of at least one percent of the electorate in the constituencies for which they sought election, disallowing electors from signing for more than one list. Concurrently, parties, federations or alliances that had not obtained a parliamentary mandate at the preceding election were required to secure the signature of at least 0.1 percent of electors in the aforementioned constituencies. Additionally, a balanced composition of men and women was required in the electoral lists, so that candidates of either sex made up at least 40 percent of the total composition.

Below is a list of the main parties and alliances which contested the election:

Candidacy	Parties and alliances	Leading candidate	Ideology	Previous result		Gov.	Ref.
Candidacy	Parties and alliances	Leading candidate	Ideology	Vote %	Seats	Gov.	Ref.
JxSí	List: Democratic Convergence of Catalonia (CDC); Republican Left of Catalonia (ERC); Democrats of Catalonia (DC); Left Movement (MES); Independence Rally (RI.cat); Civil society independents (including ANC, Òmnium and AMI)	Artur Mas	Catalan independence Big tent	44.4%	71	Yes (Note: CDC was in the government, while all other parties were in opposition providing confidence and supply support.)	
PSC–PSOE	List: Socialists' Party of Catalonia (PSC–PSOE)	Miquel Iceta	Social democracy	14.4%	20	No	
PP	List: People's Party (PP)	Xavier García Albiol	Conservatism; Christian democracy	13.0%	19	No	
CatSíqueesPot	List: We Can (Podem); Initiative for Catalonia Greens (ICV); United and Alternative Left (EUiA) – Communists of Catalonia (Comunistes.Cat) – Living Unified Socialist Party of Catalonia (PSUC viu) – The Dawn Marxist Organization (La Aurora (OM)); Equo (Equo)	Lluís Rabell	Left-wing populism Direct democracy Eco-socialism	9.9%	13	No	
C's	List: Citizens–Party of the Citizenry (C's)	Inés Arrimadas	Liberalism	7.6%	9	No	
CUP	List: Popular Unity Candidacy (CUP) – Forward–Socialist Organization of National Liberation (Endavant–OSAN) – Free People (PL–PPCC) – Internationalist Struggle (LI–CI) – In Struggle (EL) – Red Current (CR)	Antonio Baños	Catalan independence Anti-capitalism; Socialism	3.5%	3	No	
unio.cat	List: Democratic Union of Catalonia (unio.cat)	Ramon Espadaler	Regionalism; Christian democracy	Contested in alliance (Note: unio.cat contested the 2012 election within CiU, securing 13 seats.)		No	

Democratic Convergence of Catalonia (CDC), Republican Left of Catalonia (ERC), Democrats of Catalonia (DC) and Left Movement (MES) agreed by mid-July 2015 to run together under the Junts pel Sí (English: Together for Yes) joint separatist list, with support from the pro-independence Catalan National Assembly (ANC), Òmnium and the also separatist Municipalities' Association for Independence (AMI). Artur Mas was named as the agreed presidential candidate, even though, as a result of balance of power negotiations between ERC and CDC, he was placed 4th in the electoral ticket. Instead, the list was to be headed by three independent figures: Raül Romeva, former MEP for ICV who had left the party for not supporting independence; Carme Forcadell, former ANC president and Muriel Casals, Òmnium chairwoman. Oriol Junqueras would follow in 5th place.

The coalition was thus scheduled to comprise the ruling centre-right CDC; its supporting centre-left partner in parliament, ERC; DC and MES, pro-independence splits from UDC and PSC, respectively; and members from separatist sectors of the civil society. The Popular Unity Candidacy (CUP), which had also participated in the negotiations to form the unitary list, eventually refused on the grounds that "it was formed by politicians"—in reference to CDC and ERC's strong presence in the coalition's lists—and decided to run separately.

After the success of Ada Colau's Barcelona en Comú platform in the 2015 Barcelona municipal election, its member parties Podemos, Initiative for Catalonia Greens (ICV) and United and Alternative Left (EUiA) entered talks for coalescing into a similar, regional-wide coalition for the September election to run as an alternative to Mas' independence plan. By 15 July 2015, negotiations between the parties were already close to success, and it was agreed that they would stand together in the Catalunya Sí que es Pot electoral platform (English: Catalonia Yes We Can). On 23 July, Lluís Rabell was presented as the platform's candidate for the regional premiership, while ecologist party Equo announced its intention to join the coalition on 29 July.

== Campaign ==
=== Party slogans ===
Party or alliance	Slogan (Catalan)	Slogan (Spanish)	English translation	Ref.
JxSí	« El vot de la teva vida »	« El voto de tu vida »	"The vote of your life"	
PSC–PSOE	« Per una Catalunya millor en una Espanya diferent »	« Por una Cataluña mejor en una España diferente »	"For a better Catalonia in a different Spain"	
PP	« Units guanyem. Plantem cara »	« Unidos ganamos. Plantemos cara »	"United we win. Stand up!"	
CatSíqueesPot	« La Catalunya de la gent »	« La Catalunya de la gente »	"The Catalonia of the people"	
C's	« Una nova Catalunya per a tothom »	« Una nueva Cataluña para todos »	"A new Catalonia for everyone"	
CUP	« Governem-nos »	« Gobernémonos »	"Let's govern ourselves"	
unio.cat	« La força del seny »	« La fuerza del sentido común »	"The force of common sense"	

=== Party stances ===
Source: Historia Electoral.com
Stance on independence	Parties and alliances	Referendum	Constitutional reform
Yes	Together for Yes	check	Question
Yes	Popular Unity Candidacy	check	Question
No	Socialists' Party of Catalonia	X mark	check
No	People's Party	X mark	X mark
No	Citizens–Party of the Citizenry	X mark	X mark
Neutral	Catalonia Yes We Can	check	check
Neutral	Democratic Union of Catalonia	check	check

=== Debates ===
2015 Catalan regional election debates
Date	Organizer(s)	Moderator(s)	P Present (Note: Denotes a main invitee attending the event.) S Surrogate (Note: Denotes a main invitee not attending the event, sending a surrogate in their place.) NI Not invited I Invited A Absent invitee							
Date	Organizer(s)	Moderator(s)	JxSí	PSC	PP	CSQP	unio.cat	C's	CUP	Refs
17 September	8tv (El debat de '8 al dia')	Josep Cuní	P Romeva	P Iceta	P Albiol	P Rabell	P Espadaler	P Arrimadas	S Gabriel	
17 September	RTVE (El Debat de La 1)	Maria Casado	S Comín	S Granados	S Levy	S Coscubiela	S Montañola	S Carrizosa	P Baños	
19 September	TV3 (El Debat Electoral)	Mònica Terribas	P Romeva	P Iceta	P Albiol	P Rabell	P Espadaler	P Arrimadas	P Baños	
20 September	laSexta (El Debat)	Ana Pastor	P Romeva	P Iceta	P Albiol	P Rabell	P Espadaler	P Arrimadas	P Baños	
23 September	8tv (Cara a cara)	Josep Cuní	P Junqueras	NI	P Margallo	NI	NI	NI	NI	

== Opinion polls ==
The tables below list opinion polling results in reverse chronological order, showing the most recent first and using the dates when the survey fieldwork was done, as opposed to the date of publication. Where the fieldwork dates are unknown, the date of publication is given instead. The highest percentage figure in each polling survey is displayed with its background shaded in the leading party's colour. If a tie ensues, this is applied to the figures with the highest percentages. The "Lead" column on the right shows the percentage-point difference between the parties with the highest percentages in a poll.

=== Graphical summary ===
Local regression trend line of poll results from 25 November 2012 to 27 September 2015, with each line corresponding to a political party.

=== Voting intention estimates ===
The table below lists weighted voting intention estimates. Refusals are generally excluded from the party vote percentages, while question wording and the treatment of "don't know" responses and those not intending to vote may vary between polling organisations. When available, seat projections determined by the polling organisations are displayed below (or in place of) the percentages in a smaller font; 68 seats were required for an absolute majority in the Parliament of Catalonia.

Color key:

Poll conducted after legal ban on opinion polls Exit poll

Polling firm/Commissioner	Fieldwork date	Sample size	Turnout	CiU	PSC	ERC	PP	ICV–EUiA	C's	CUP	CDC	unio.cat	Podemos	JxSí	CatSíqueesPot	Lead
2015 regional election	27 Sep 2015	—N/a	74.9	–	12.7; 16	(Note: Within JxSí.)	8.5; 11	(Note: Within CatSíqueesPot.)	17.9; 25	8.2; 10		2.5; 0		39.6; 62	8.9; 11	21.7
TNS Demoscopia/CCMA	27 Sep 2015	30,000	?	–	12.0; 14/16		7.7; 9/11		15.4; 19/21	9.1; 11/13		2.9; 0/3		40.7; 63/66	10.4; 12/14	25.3
Directe.cat	26 Sep 2015	?	?	–	12.0; 14/16		9.0; 10/11		16.0; 17/19	8.0; 10/12		–		42.0; 67/71	10.0; 13/15	26.0
Opinòmetre/El Periódico	23–25 Sep 2015	800	73	–	? 16/18		? 8/10		? 20/21	? 6/8		? 5/6		? 62/64	? 12/14	?
GAD3/ABC	14–25 Sep 2015	3,000	77.0	–	13.5; 16/18		9.0; 10/12		14.5; 18/20	8.0; 9/11		3.0; 2/3		40.0; 62/65	9.5; 11/13	25.5
Técnicas Demoscópicas/8TV (Note: "ENQUESTA EXCLUSIVA '8 AL DIA': l'independentisme aconseguiria majoria absoluta el 27-S". 8TV (in Catalan). 21 September 2015.)	21 Sep 2015	1,200	?	–	12.0; 14/15		11.0; 13		13.0; 18/20	7.0; 9		2.5; 0/3		41.0; 62/64	12.0; 15	28.0
Celeste-Tel	16–21 Sep 2015	1,100	?	–	12.2; 16/17		9.1; 10/12		17.0; 22/23	7.8; 9/10		2.6; 0/1		38.9; 59/62	11.9; 12/13	21.9
Celeste-Tel	15–20 Sep 2015	1,100	?	–	12.0; 15/17		9.3; 11/12		16.7; 22/23	7.7; 8/10		2.9; 0/1		38.7; 59/62	12.1; 13/14	22.0
Celeste-Tel	14–19 Sep 2015	1,100	?	–	12.1; 15/16		9.7; 11/12		16.5; 22/23	7.4; 7/9		3.0; 1/2		38.5; 58/61	12.0; 13/14	22.0
Encuestamos	12–19 Sep 2015	844	?	–	13.4; 17/19		10.5; 12/14		13.3; 17/19	8.3; 10/12		2.3; 0/2		35.7; 54/57	14.6; 18/21	21.1
NC Report/La Razón	11–19 Sep 2015	1,255	?	–	12.1; 16		9.9; 13		15.3; 20	6.2; 8		3.7; 3		38.0; 59	12.4; 16	22.7
JM&A/Público	18 Sep 2015	?	71.7	–	11.1; 14		9.9; 13		14.8; 20	7.3; 9		1.8; 0		40.3; 64	12.0; 15	25.5
Celeste-Tel/eldiario.es	14–18 Sep 2015	1,100	66.2	–	12.1; 15/18		9.9; 11/13		14.6; 20/21	6.2; 7/9		3.1; 2/3		38.8; 59/62	12.6; 16/17	24.2
GAD3/ABC	14–18 Sep 2015	800	73	–	11.9; 14/16		10.2; 12/13		14.1; 18/20	6.4; 7/9		1.9; 0/2		40.7; 65/67	10.3; 12/13	26.6
Invymark/laSexta	14–18 Sep 2015	?	?	–	10.6; 14		8.9; 12		14.3; 20	6.3; 8		1.8; 0		43.4; 64	12.6; 17	29.1
NC Report/La Razón	10–18 Sep 2015	?	?	–	12.2; 15/16		10.0; 13/14		15.4; 20/22	5.9; 7/8		3.5; 3/5		38.0; 59/60	12.5; 15/16	22.6
Sigma Dos/El Mundo	16–17 Sep 2015	1,400	?	–	10.8; 13/14		9.6; 12/13		14.8; 19/20	7.3; 9		2.8; 0/2		40.5; 65/66	11.2; 14	25.7
Feedback/La Vanguardia	14–17 Sep 2015	1,000	72.3	–	10.1; 12/14		10.6; 12/13		14.4; 20/21	6.4; 8		4.2; 3		40.7; 63/65	11.1; 13/15	26.3
MyWord/Cadena SER	10–17 Sep 2015	1,000	?	–	11.7; 14/16		8.8; 10		15.4; 21/22	8.1; 9/12		1.5; 0		40.1; 61/65	12.6; 15/17	24.7
NC Report/La Razón	9–17 Sep 2015	?	?	–	11.9; 15/16		9.7; 12/13		15.8; 21/22	5.6; 6/7		3.7; 4/5		38.1; 59/60	12.3; 15/16	22.3
Infortécnica	16 Sep 2015	366	?	–	? 14/16		? 10/12		? 22/24	? 7/9		? 3/5		? 59/61	? 14/16	?
Metroscopia/El País	14–16 Sep 2015	2,000	74	–	11.7; 14		7.3; 10		14.9; 19	8.4; 10/11		2.7; 0/2		41.2; 66/67	11.4; 14	26.3
DYM/El Confidencial	14–16 Sep 2015	1,157	?	–	8.4; 10/11		11.9; 16		18.3; 21/23	7.5; 10/11		1.1; 0		42.4; 63/65	10.4; 12	24.1
Opinòmetre/Economía Digital (Note: "Mas y Junqueras lograrían 62 diputados, según el sondeo de Economía Digital". Economía Digital (in Spanish). 17 September 2015.)	14–16 Sep 2015	1,000	?	–	13.2; 15/17		8.9; 14/16		15.9; 18/20	6.4; 6/8		5.2; 5/6		39.2; 60/62	11.1; 17/19	23.3
NC Report/La Razón	8–16 Sep 2015	?	?	–	11.6; 15/16		9.5; 12/13		16.2; 22/23	5.6; 5/6		3.8; 4/5		37.9; 59/60	12.5; 16	21.7
Sigma Dos/Mediaset	14–15 Sep 2015	1,800	?	–	9.1; 12		9.3; 11/13		15.4; 20	8.2; 10		2.2; 0		40.3; 65/66	12.3; 15/17	24.9
NC Report/La Razón	7–15 Sep 2015	1,255	?	–	11.4; 15		9.4; 12		16.5; 23	5.2; 5		3.9; 5		37.6; 59	12.7; 16	21.1
JM&A/Público	12 Sep 2015	?	72.0	–	10.0; 14		8.3; 13		15.5; 21	9.1; 12		2.7; 0		39.9; 60	11.3; 15	24.4
JxSí	12 Sep 2015	1,200	70.1	–	9.7; 13/15		10.4; 13/15		14.1; 17/18	6.7; 8		2.0; 0		41.0; 64/66	13.5; 17/19	26.9
Invymark/laSexta	7–11 Sep 2015	?	?	–	11.1; 15		9.6; 13		13.9; 19	5.9; 8		1.8; 0		41.3; 63	13.2; 17	27.4
Sondaxe/La Voz de Galicia	3–8 Sep 2015	750	?	–	12.6; 16		11.5; 16		11.6; 16	7.4; 8		–		42.1; 65	10.2; 14	29.5
IBES/Última Hora	1–8 Sep 2015	1,200	?	–	11.1; 15/16		10.2; 12/13		13.4; 18/19	7.2; 9/10		2.8; 0/2		38.3; 64/65	11.4; 13/14	24.9
Encuestamos	7 Sep 2015	500	?	–	12.9		9.1		12.5	8.4		4.0		33.2	19.2	14.0
IMOP/CIS	30 Aug–4 Sep 2015	2,999	?	–	12.2; 16/17		9.4; 12/13		14.8; 19/20	5.9; 8		1.5; 0		38.1; 60/61	13.9; 18/19	23.3
JM&A/Público	3 Sep 2015	?	71.6	–	10.1; 13		8.5; 11/12		15.6; 20/21	9.0; 13		2.3; 0/2		39.8; 60	11.2; 16	24.4
GAPS/El Punt Avui	1–3 Sep 2015	1,221	?	–	9.0– 10.0; 12/13		11.6– 13.0; 14/17		12.1– 13.1; 15/18	7.0– 8.0; 8/10		–		42.5– 44.5; 65/70	11.0– 12.0; 12/16	30.4– 31.4
Sigma Dos/El Mundo	31 Aug–3 Sep 2015	1,400	?	–	11.1; 14/15		9.8; 13		12.7; 16/17	6.7; 8/9		3.8; 3		39.4; 62/65	12.4; 15/17	26.7
GESOP/El Periódico	31 Aug–2 Sep 2015	800	70–72	–	10.3; 13/14		7.9; 10/11		19.9; 25/27	6.0; 7/8		2.4; 0/2		38.8; 60/62	12.4; 15/17	18.9
NC Report/La Razón	17–22 Aug 2015	955	64.4	–	11.7; 16		9.3; 12		17.9; 25	4.7; 4		4.4; 5		36.3; 57	12.3; 16	18.4
NC Report/La Razón	16–23 Jul 2015	1,255	64.6	–	12.0; 18		8.2; 10		19.1; 27	4.2; 3		4.6; 5		35.8; 56	12.8; 16	16.7
JM&A/Público	21 Jul 2015	?	74.1	–	7.6; 10		6.7; 9		15.7; 21	7.2; 10		3.6; 3		39.2; 59	17.0; 23	22.2
Feedback/La Vanguardia	6–9 Jul 2015	1,000	69.5	–	7.5; 9/10		6.6; 7/9		17.0; 21/23			3.3; 2/3		46.7; 68/72	17.5; 22/23	29.2
Feedback/La Vanguardia	6–9 Jul 2015	1,000	69.4	–	9.6; 13	15.0; 22	7.3; 9/10		16.0; 22	7.0; 9/10	22.0; 32/34	4.2; 3/6		–	16.5; 20/22	5.5
GAPS/Òmnium	1–3 Jul 2015	820	?	–	9.0; 12		9.0; 12		16.0; 20	8.0; 10		4.0; 3		32.0; 52	20.0; 26	12.0
GAPS/Òmnium	1–3 Jul 2015	820	?	–	11.0; 13		7.0; 8		12.0; 14			3.0; 2		49.0; 75	18.0; 23	31.0
GAPS/Òmnium	1–3 Jul 2015	820	?	–	12.0; 15	15.0; 25	6.0; 8		17.0; 21	10.0; 12	19.0; 30	3.0; 2		–	17.0; 22	2.0
GESOP/El Periódico (Note: "Solo un tercio de votantes de CiU quería mantener viva la federación". El Periódico de Catalunya (in Spanish). 25 June 2015.)	17–21 Jun 2015	800	?	22.7; 34/35	8.0; 10/11	16.0; 24/25	6.9; 8/9	4.5; 4/5	16.2; 20/21	9.8; 12/13	(Note: Within CiU.)		13.8; 19/20	–	–	6.5
GESOP/El Periódico	17–21 Jun 2015	800	?	–	7.8; 10/11	13.8; 20/21	5.9; 6/7	4.2; 4/5	15.1; 19/20	9.4; 12/13	23.1; 34/36	4.7; 6/7	13.8; 18/19	–	–	8.0
GESOP/El Periódico	17–21 Jun 2015	800	? (Note: Catalunya en Comú and Llista del President (CDC+independents from civil society) hypothesis.)	–	7.0; 8/9	12.9; 19/20	6.0; 6/7	(Note: Within CeC.)	14.9; 19/20	8.2; 11/12	22.4; 33/35	4.6; 6/7		–	22.4; 30/31	Tie
Feedback/La Vanguardia	27–29 Apr 2015	1,000	66.5	22.6; 35/36	9.9; 12/13	16.6; 26/27	6.6; 9	6.6; 8	19.1; 26	7.9; 10/11			6.3; 6/8	–	–	3.5
Opinòmetre/CEO	9 Feb–2 Mar 2015	2,000	68	19.5; 31/32	8.2; 11/12	18.9; 30/31	10.2; 13/14	5.8; 6/8	12.4; 16/17	7.3; 10/11			12.2; 16/17	–	–	0.6
GESOP/El Periódico	20–26 Feb 2015	800	?	20.1; 31/32	7.9; 10/11	17.3; 27/28	9.8; 12/13	6.9; 8/9	17.8; 23/24	7.1; 9/10			9.8; 11/12	–	–	2.3
CDC	26 Jan 2015	?	?	? 43	? 10	? 30	? 10	? 6	? 16/17	? 7/8			? 10/11	–	–	?
NC Report/La Razón	15–17 Jan 2015	955	66.1	21.5; 34	10.7; 15	21.7; 33	9.9; 13	5.8; 7	12.9; 16	3.5; 3			11.4; 14	–	–	0.2
Tàstic/ERC (Note: Undecided and/or abstentionists excluded.)	4–14 Dec 2014	2,073	?	17.9; 31/33	5.0; 11/12	22.3; 36/38	2.1; 5	3.9; 4/5	9.7; 13/14	5.9; 7/8			21.5; 24/25	–	–	0.8
Tàstic/ERC	4–14 Dec 2014	2,073	?	–	5.8		2.8	10.0	4.1	3.8		–	17.7	42.8	–	25.1
Tàstic/ERC	4–14 Dec 2014	2,073	? (Note: "Now is the time" (CiU, ERC and CUP+independents from civil society) hypothesis.)	25.9	7.2	20.8	1.8	8.1	1.8	7.3			17.4	–	–	5.1
DYM/CEO	9–13 Dec 2014	1,100	67	21.9; 34/36	10.3; 13/14	21.0; 34/35	8.8; 11/12	6.6; 7/8	11.3; 14/16	5.5; 7/8			8.2; 9/11	–	–	0.9
Feedback/La Vanguardia	1–4 Dec 2014	1,000	61.6		11.1; 13		8.8; 11	6.2; 7	14.3; 19	5.9; 6	–	–	11.2; 15	41.7; 64	–	27.4
Feedback/La Vanguardia	1–4 Dec 2014	1,000	67.7	26.7; 40	9.3; 12	18.8; 27	7.2; 9	4.9; 6	13.7; 19	6.5; 8			11.3; 14	–	–	7.9
Sigma Dos/El Mundo	17–20 Nov 2014	800	?	23.8; 36	10.2; 14	22.1; 34	7.4; 9	4.5; 4	9.7; 14	3.8; 4			14.3; 20	–	–	1.7
GESOP/El Periódico	14–17 Nov 2014	800	?	–	10.2; 13/14		7.2; 9/10	8.0; 9/11	11.8; 15/16	6.1; 8		2.4; 0	15.5; 20/21	35.2; 58/60	–	19.7
GESOP/El Periódico	14–17 Nov 2014	800	?	20.8; 32/34	8.2; 10/11	19.9; 31/33	7.8; 10/11	8.2; 10/11	13.5; 16/17	5.2; 6			13.8; 16/17	–	–	0.9
NC Report/La Razón	13–15 Nov 2014	?	66.4	22.8; 34	10.8; 16	21.0; 32	10.0; 13	6.0; 7	12.0; 15	3.7; 4			10.9; 14	–	–	1.8
JM&A	7 Nov 2014	?	65.0	21.3; 34	10.9; 15	20.1; 33	8.6; 12	6.5; 9	6.4; 8	6.1; 8			9.8; 16	–	–	1.2
Opinòmetre/CEO	29 Sep–23 Oct 2014	2,000	?	19.4; 32/33	11.2; 14/16	23.2; 38/39	8.6; 11/13	7.2; 8/9	7.0; 8/9	6.5; 8/9			8.5; 10/11	–	–	3.8
NC Report/La Razón	14–18 Oct 2014	970	64.4	17.5; 26/28	11.8; 15/17	23.0; 33/34	10.9; 14/17	6.9; 7/8	13.0; 16/18	4.2; 5			9.2; 12	–	–	5.5
NC Report/La Razón	1–6 Sep 2014	970	63.8	18.1; 27/30	11.8; 16/17	23.0; 33/37	10.7; 13/16	7.0; 9	13.0; 16/17	4.6; 5/6			8.1; 9/11	–	–	4.9
Sigma Dos/El Mundo	26–29 Aug 2014	?	?	19.1; 30	13.8; 20	23.2; 35	9.5; 13	5.6; 8	7.5; 9	3.6; 3			12.4; 17	–	–	4.1
NC Report/La Razón	22–26 Jul 2014	970	63.7	–	11.9	22.8	10.8	7.5	12.7	4.9	13.3	5.9	6.9	–	–	9.5
NC Report/La Razón	22–26 Jul 2014	970	63.7	19.2; 29/31	11.9; 16/18	22.8; 33/35	10.8; 13/16	7.5; 9	12.7; 16	4.9; 6			6.9; 8	–	–	3.6
GESOP/El Periódico	16–18 Jun 2014	800	?	–	7.7; 10	23.4; 39/40	6.9; 8/9	8.7; 11/12	11.7; 16	4.5; 6	17.5; 27/29	5.1; 6/7	8.0; 9/10	–	–	5.9
GESOP/El Periódico	16–18 Jun 2014	800	?	18.5; 29/30	8.9; 11/12	23.9; 39	9.5; 13	8.6; 10/11	12.2; 16/17	4.7; 6			8.5; 9/10	–	–	5.4
2014 EP election	25 May 2014	—N/a	46.2	21.8 (36)	14.3 (20)	23.7 (40)	9.8 (13)	10.3 (14)	6.3 (7)	–			4.7 (5)	–	–	1.9
Feedback/La Vanguardia	30 Apr–8 May 2014	577	56.7	23.9; 37	12.7; 16	22.5; 34	12.4; 16	9.8; 11	11.5; 15	5.2; 6			–	–	–	1.4
Opinòmetre/CEO	24 Mar–15 Apr 2014	2,000	60	22.0; 35/36	11.4; 14/15	21.8; 34/35	9.2; 12/13	11.7; 14/15	11.6; 14/15	6.6; 7/9			–	–	–	0.2
NC Report/La Razón	7–12 Apr 2014	970	62.4	21.9; 33/35	12.8; 18	22.3; 33/34	11.2; 15/16	9.5; 12	12.6; 16/17	5.3; 6			–	–	–	0.4
Ara	15 Mar 2014	?	?	22.3	11.0	23.0	9.2	10.7	13.1	4.9			–	–	–	0.7
GESOP/El Periódico	26–28 Feb 2014	800	?	22.5; 35/36	11.0; 14/15	21.7; 34/35	9.0; 12/13	11.5; 14/15	13.9; 17/18	4.5; 6			–	–	–	0.8
Sondeos RA	5–10 Feb 2014	1,000	68.4	22.9; 34/36	11.2; 13/15	23.2; 36/38	10.8; 13/15	9.6; 12/14	13.1; 16/18	5.5; 6/7			–	–	–	0.3
NC Report/La Razón	20–25 Jan 2014	970	63.3	22.8; 33/34	12.6; 17/18	20.8; 31	11.8; 16	9.9; 14	10.9; 16	5.3; 7			–	–	–	2.0
Feedback/La Vanguardia	16–19 Dec 2013	1,000	61.2	22.4; 34/36	12.4; 16	23.5; 35/37	9.5; 13	10.1; 12/13	14.2; 18	4.4; 5/6			–	–	–	1.1
NC Report/La Razón	9–14 Dec 2013	880	64.5	22.9; 35/36	12.1; 16/17	21.9; 32/33	11.7; 14/16	9.9; 13	11.1; 15	6.0; 7			–	–	–	1.0
Sigma Dos/El Mundo	12–13 Dec 2013	1,000	?	24.3; 38/39	12.5; 16	20.6; 32/34	11.5; 15/16	8.7; 11	10.2; 12/14	6.0; 7/9			–	–	–	3.7
GESOP/CEO	4–14 Nov 2013	2,000	60	22.2; 34/36	11.1; 14/16	24.2; 37/39	9.4; 13/14	9.8; 12/14	12.2; 15/17	5.2; 6/7			–	–	–	2.0
Metroscopia/El País	28–30 Oct 2013	1,000	70	19.4; 32	8.4; 13	23.2; 37	7.5; 12	10.5; 14	15.3; 21	4.9; 6			–	–	–	3.8
GESOP/El Periódico	16–18 Oct 2013	800	?	20.2; 31/32	11.1; 14/16	22.8; 36/38	10.1; 13/14	11.5; 14/15	13.5; 16/18	4.4; 5/6			–	–	–	2.6
Feedback/La Vanguardia	30 Sep–4 Oct 2013	1,000	61.1	23.9; 36/37	11.9; 15/16	24.2; 36/37	10.6; 14/16	10.3; 12/13	9.6; 12/13	5.2; 6			–	–	–	0.3
MyWord/Cadena SER	2–7 Sep 2013	800	?	20.7	10.5	22.1	7.0	12.1	12.6	3.3			–	–	–	1.4
GESOP/CEO	31 May–13 Jun 2013	2,000	60	22.8; 35/37	12.1; 16	24.4; 38/39	10.4; 13/14	9.6; 13/14	9.5; 12	4.9; 6			–	–	–	1.6
GESOP/El Periódico	28–31 May 2013	800	?	21.4; 34/35	12.2; 16/17	24.3; 39/40	10.2; 13/14	12.2; 15/16	10.0; 12/13	3.5; 3			–	–	–	2.9
NC Report/La Razón	23 Mar 2013	?	64.9	26.2; 39/42	12.0; 15/16	17.9; 27/28	12.9; 18/19	9.2; 12	10.9; 14/15	5.8; 7			–	–	–	8.3
GESOP/CEO	4–14 Feb 2013	2,000	60	24.8; 40/42	15.3; 19/20	18.2; 27/28	11.9; 16/17	10.1; 12/13	9.1; 11/12	4.5; 4/6			–	–	–	6.6
GESOP/El Periódico	14–16 Jan 2013	800	?	25.2; 40/42	13.4; 18/19	16.9; 27/28	11.5; 16/17	10.0; 12/13	9.8; 12/13	5.2; 6/7			–	–	–	8.3
NC Report/La Razón	16–21 Dec 2012	880	62.0	29.6; 48	14.7; 20	14.9; 23	13.5; 19	9.8; 13	7.9; 9	3.6; 3			–	–	–	14.7
2012 regional election	25 Nov 2012	—N/a	67.8	30.7; 50	14.4; 20	13.7; 21	13.0; 19	9.9; 13	7.6; 9	3.5; 3			–	–	–	16.3

=== Voting preferences ===
The table below lists raw, unweighted voting preferences.

Polling firm/Commissioner	Fieldwork date	Sample size	CiU	PSC	ERC	PP	ICV–EUiA	C's	CUP	CDC	unio.cat	Podemos	JxSí	CatSíqueesPot	Question	X mark	Lead
2015 regional election (Note: Does not include non-resident citizens.)	27 Sep 2015	—N/a	–	9.8		6.6		13.8	6.3		1.9		30.5	6.9	—N/a	22.6	16.7
MyWord/Cadena SER	10–17 Sep 2015	1,000	–	6.6		4.2		10.6	7.9		1.1		35.9	8.1	20.4	3.6	25.3
Infortécnica	16 Sep 2015	366	–	8.0		4.3		9.0	6.1		2.3		31.9	7.6	21.9	7.8	22.9
IMOP/CIS	30 Aug–4 Sep 2015	2,999	–	7.4		3.9		8.8	5.6		1.0		32.3	8.6	26.1	2.8	23.5
GESOP/El Periódico	31 Aug–2 Sep 2015	800	–	5.0		2.8		9.5	5.8		1.0		32.4	5.9	31.9	3.6	22.9
GESOP/El Periódico	17–21 Jun 2015	800	17.4	6.8	15.9	2.8	4.0	11.6	8.9			11.9	–	–	12.4	4.6	1.5
GESOP/El Periódico	17–21 Jun 2015	800	–	6.9	13.8	2.9		11.0	7.6	17.0	3.3		–	22.4	8.7	3.5	5.4
Opinòmetre/CEO	9 Feb–2 Mar 2015	2,000	13.2	6.8	17.3	2.2	3.8	7.7	7.3			11.6	–	–	14.7	9.7	4.1
GESOP/El Periódico	20–26 Feb 2015	800	14.6	5.1	16.8	3.1	4.4	13.9	5.9			8.6	–	–	15.1	5.5	2.2
Tàstic/ERC	4–14 Dec 2014	2,073	14.4	4.0	17.9	1.7	3.1	7.8	4.7			17.3	–	–	19.6		0.6
Tàstic/ERC	4–14 Dec 2014	2,073	–	4.5		2.2	7.8	3.2	3.0		–	13.8	33.4	–	22.0		19.6
Tàstic/ERC	4–14 Dec 2014	2,073	18.8	5.2	15.1	1.3	5.9	1.3	5.3			12.6	–	–	27.4		3.7
DYM/CEO	9–13 Dec 2014	1,100	14.0	4.8	17.2	1.8	3.9	5.5	4.4			4.6	–	–	29.4	9.0	3.2
GESOP/ICPS	12 Nov–6 Dec 2014	1,200	16.2	8.2	19.7	1.7	3.7	4.5	7.0			11.1	–	–	14.2	9.3	3.5
GESOP/El Periódico	14–17 Nov 2014	800	–	6.9		1.4	6.4	8.9	4.8		1.9	19.5	31.3	–	11.8	3.5	11.8
GESOP/El Periódico	14–17 Nov 2014	800	16.1	4.3	20.0	1.3	5.5	9.5	3.8			12.8	–	–	16.4	5.1	3.9
Opinòmetre/CEO	29 Sep–23 Oct 2014	2,000	13.8	5.8	21.4	2.2	3.7	2.2	6.2			6.2	–	–	18.4	11.9	7.6
GESOP/El Periódico	1–2 Sep 2014	800	8.4	4.9	19.0	3.4	4.5	4.4	1.8			8.1	–	–	30.4	9.0	10.6
GESOP/El Periódico	16–18 Jun 2014	800	–	4.0	21.9	1.9	6.9	6.8	3.6	11.0	2.6	7.1	–	–	20.5	6.1	10.9
GESOP/El Periódico	16–18 Jun 2014	800	11.6	4.6	22.4	2.6	6.8	7.1	3.8			7.5	–	–	17.5	7.6	10.8
2014 EP election	25 May 2014	—N/a	10.3	6.7	11.2	4.6	4.9	3.0	–			2.2	–	–	—N/a	52.4	0.9
Opinòmetre/CEO	24 Mar–15 Apr 2014	2,000	14.5	6.1	20.0	1.6	5.0	4.0	6.4			–	–	–	20.1	14.8	5.5
GESOP/El Periódico	26–28 Feb 2014	800	16.1	6.6	19.9	2.0	7.0	7.5	3.9			–	–	–	18.0	9.3	3.8
GESOP/CEO	4–14 Nov 2013	2,000	17.2	5.6	21.1	1.4	6.2	5.3	3.9			–	–	–	20.9	10.8	3.9
Metroscopia/El País	28–30 Oct 2013	1,000	15.4	6.7	19.4	3.6	6.6	10.0	3.9			–	–	–	20.6	7.2	4.0
GESOP/El Periódico	16–18 Oct 2013	800	16.4	7.4	22.3	3.4	7.4	8.1	3.3			–	–	–	15.6	7.1	5.9
GESOP/ICPS	25 Sep–10 Oct 2013	800	17.9	9.2	21.9	2.8	7.3	6.8	4.3			–	–	–	11.8	11.4	4.0
MyWord/Cadena SER	2–7 Sep 2013	800	11.0	3.4	21.6	1.9	11.2	7.4	5.0			–	–	–	20.2	6.5	10.4
GESOP/CEO	31 May–13 Jun 2013	2,000	18.2	6.9	22.0	2.1	7.4	5.1	4.8			–	–	–	16.2	9.9	3.8
GESOP/El Periódico	28–31 May 2013	800	14.6	5.5	20.5	3.8	8.1	4.8	2.3			–	–	–	17.0	11.1	5.9
GESOP/CEO	4–14 Feb 2013	2,000	19.3	6.6	20.9	1.8	9.5	4.2	4.4			–	–	–	18.1	8.6	1.6
GESOP/El Periódico	14–16 Jan 2013	800	19.9	6.9	19.1	3.5	7.5	7.0	4.8			–	–	–	16.1	8.3	0.8
2012 regional election	25 Nov 2012	—N/a	21.2	10.0	9.4	9.0	6.8	5.2	2.4			–	–	–	—N/a	30.4	11.2

=== Victory preferences ===
The table below lists opinion polling on the victory preferences for each party in the event of a regional election taking place.

Polling firm/Commissioner	Fieldwork date	Sample size	PSC	PP	C's	CUP	unio.cat	JxSí	CatSíqueesPot	Other/ None	Question	Lead
IMOP/CIS	30 Aug–4 Sep 2015	2,999	8.5	4.1	9.6	4.7	1.5	36.6	10.2	8.9	15.9	26.4

=== Victory likelihood ===
The table below lists opinion polling on the perceived likelihood of victory for each party in the event of a regional election taking place.

Polling firm/Commissioner	Fieldwork date	Sample size	CiU	PSC	ERC	PP	ICV–EUiA	C's	CUP	CDC	unio.cat	Podemos	JxSí	CatSíqueesPot	Other/ None	Question	Lead
IMOP/CIS	30 Aug–4 Sep 2015	2,999	–	3.6		2.8		3.3	0.2		0.2		58.3	3.9	1.9	25.9	54.4
GESOP/El Periódico	17–21 Jun 2015	800	28.9	3.9	22.6	0.4	0.3	3.4	0.8			8.5	–	–	0.9	30.5	6.3

=== Preferred President ===
The table below lists opinion polling on leader preferences to become president of the Government of Catalonia.

Color key:

Poll conducted after legal ban on opinion polls

Polling firm/Commissioner	Fieldwork date	Sample size													Other/ None/ Not care	Question	Lead
Polling firm/Commissioner	Fieldwork date	Sample size	Mas CiU/CDC	Navarro PSC	Iceta PSC	Junqueras ERC	Camacho PP	Albiol PP	Herrera ICV–EUiA	Rivera C's	Arrimadas C's	Fernández CUP	Baños CUP	Rabell CSQP	Other/ None/ Not care	Question	Lead
IMOP/CIS	30 Aug–4 Sep 2015	2,999	22.5	–	5.7	13.2	–	3.9	–	1.7	6.1	0.3	1.7	3.9	14.1	26.9	9.3
GESOP/El Periódico	31 Aug–2 Sep 2015	800	20.1	–	3.3	8.0	–	1.8	–	4.4	3.8	0.3	1.8	2.6	5.6	48.6	12.1
GESOP/El Periódico	17–21 Jun 2015	800	22.8	–	2.9	13.6	1.9	–	3.1	13.8	–	7.8	–	–	22.5	11.8	9.0
GESOP/El Periódico	20–26 Feb 2015	800	19.9	–	3.9	15.6	3.4	–	4.6	17.0	–	6.0	–	–	20.2	9.5	2.9
GESOP/El Periódico	14–17 Nov 2014	800	21.9	–	3.1	19.0	1.9	–	5.3	10.0	–	4.0	–	–	21.9	13.0	2.9
GESOP/El Periódico	26–28 Feb 2014	800	24.4	6.3	–	18.8	3.6	–	6.3	9.1	–	3.5	–	–	18.3	9.9	5.6
GESOP/El Periódico	16–18 Oct 2013	800	21.3	6.0	–	22.8	3.5	–	7.0	9.9	–	2.6	–	–	20.2	6.9	1.5

== Voter turnout ==
The table below shows registered voter turnout during the election. Figures for election day do not include non-resident citizens, while final figures do.

Province	Time (Election day)									Final		
Province	13:00			18:00			20:00			Final		
Province	2012	2015	+/–	2012	2015	+/–	2012	2015	+/–	2012	2015	+/–
Barcelona	29.41%	34.72%	+5.31	56.58%	63.21%	+6.63	69.89%	77.61%	+7.72	68.00%	75.03%	+7.03
Girona	32.71%	38.47%	+5.76	59.44%	65.08%	+5.64	70.77%	77.99%	+7.22	69.29%	75.94%	+6.65
Lleida	26.45%	33.75%	+7.30	53.45%	61.11%	+7.66	69.29%	76.79%	+7.50	66.78%	73.63%	+6.85
Tarragona	28.24%	35.56%	+7.32	52.96%	61.78%	+8.82	66.39%	76.00%	+9.61	65.17%	74.19%	+9.02
Total	29.43%	35.10%	+5.67	56.30%	63.12%	+6.82	69.57%	77.43%	+7.86	67.76%	74.95%	+7.19

== Results ==
=== Overall ===
← Summary of the 27 September 2015 Parliament of Catalonia election results →
Parties and alliances	Popular vote			Seats	
Parties and alliances	Votes	%	±pp	Total	+/−
Together for Yes (JxSí)^{1}	1,628,714	39.59	−4.82	62	−9
Citizens–Party of the Citizenry (C's)	736,364	17.90	+10.33	25	+16
Socialists' Party of Catalonia (PSC–PSOE)	523,283	12.72	−1.67	16	−4
Catalonia Yes We Can (CatSíqueesPot)^{2}	367,613	8.94	−0.96	11	−2
People's Party (PP)	349,193	8.49	−4.49	11	−8
Popular Unity Candidacy (CUP)	337,794	8.21	+4.73	10	+7
Democratic Union of Catalonia (unio.cat)	103,293	2.51	New	0	±0
Animalist Party Against Mistreatment of Animals (PACMA)	30,157	0.73	+0.16	0	±0
Zero Cuts–The Greens (Recortes Cero–EV)	14,444	0.35	New	0	±0
Let's Win Catalonia (Ganemos)	1,167	0.03	New	0	±0
Pirates of Catalonia–To Decide Everything (Pirata.cat/XDT)	327	0.01	−0.49	0	±0
Blank ballots	21,895	0.53	−0.93		
Total	4,114,244			135	±0
Valid votes	4,114,244	99.61	+0.51		
Invalid votes	15,952	0.39	−0.51		
Votes cast / turnout	4,130,196	74.95	+7.19		
Abstentions	1,380,657	25.05	−7.19		
Registered voters	5,510,853				
Sources
Footnotes: ^{1} Together for Yes results are compared to the combined totals of Convergence and Union and Republican Left of Catalonia in the 2012 election.; ^{2} Catalonia Yes We Can results are compared to Initiative for Catalonia Greens–United and Alternative Left totals in the 2012 election.

Popular vote
JxSí	39.59%
C's	17.90%
PSC–PSOE	12.72%
CatSíqueesPot	8.94%
PP	8.49%
CUP	8.21%
unio.cat	2.51%
Others	1.12%
Blank ballots	0.53%

Seats
JxSí	45.93%
C's	18.52%
PSC–PSOE	11.85%
CatSíqueesPot	8.15%
PP	8.15%
CUP	7.41%

=== Distribution by constituency ===
Constituency	JxSí		C's		PSC		CSQP		PP		CUP	
Constituency	%	S	%	S	%	S	%	S	%	S	%	S
Barcelona	36.1	32	18.8	17	13.7	12	10.1	9	8.8	8	8.3	7
Girona	56.1	11	12.5	2	8.7	1	4.8	1	5.9	1	8.6	1
Lleida	55.2	10	11.6	2	8.4	1	4.3	−	7.3	1	8.2	1
Tarragona	41.6	9	19.4	4	11.8	2	6.5	1	8.9	1	7.4	1
Total	39.6	62	17.9	25	12.7	16	8.9	11	8.5	11	8.2	10

== Aftermath ==
=== Government formation ===
Investiture; Nomination of Artur Mas (CDC)
Ballot →	10 November 2015	12 November 2015
Required majority →	68 out of 135	Simple
Yes: • JxSí (62)	62 / 135	62 / 135
No: • C's (25); • PSC (16); • CatSíqueesPot (11); • PP (11); • CUP (10)	73 / 135	73 / 135
Abstentions	0 / 135	0 / 135
Absentees	0 / 135	0 / 135

Following the failure to choose a leader in January 2016 in which 1,515 CUP members voted for Mas and the same number voted against him, the assembly was due to be dissolved on 10 January and a new election called in March. Rajoy supported the new election on the grounds that it could "quash" calls for independence.

Investiture; Nomination of Carles Puigdemont (CDC)
Ballot →	10 January 2016
Required majority →	68 out of 135
Yes: • JxSí (62); • CUP (8)	70 / 135
No: • C's (25); • PSC (16); • CatSíqueesPot (11); • PP (11)	63 / 135
Abstentions: • CUP (2)	2 / 135
Absentees	0 / 135

A last minute deal was struck between Junts pel Sí and Popular Unity Candidacy to ensure a separatist government, although without Mas as president. As a result, Carles Puigdemont assumed office on 12 January 2016 as Catalan president after his investiture was approved by the Parliament on 10 January.

=== 2016 motion of confidence ===
Motion of confidence General Policy Statement (President)
Ballot →	29 September 2016
Required majority →	Simple
Yes: • JxSí (62); • CUP (10)	72 / 135
No: • C's (25); • PSC (16); • CatSíqueesPot (11); • PP (11)	63 / 135
Abstentions	0 / 135
Absentees	0 / 135

== Bibliography ==
- Ley Orgánica 4/1979, de 18 de diciembre, de Estatuto de Autonomía de Cataluña (Organic Law 4/1979). Official State Gazette (in Spanish). 18 December 1979. BOE-A-1979-30178.
- Ley Orgánica 5/1985, de 19 de junio, del Régimen Electoral General (Organic Law 5/1985). Official State Gazette (in Spanish). 19 June 1985 [version as of 31 March 2015]. BOE-A-1985-11672.
- Ley Orgánica 6/2006, de 19 de julio, de reforma del Estatuto de Autonomía de Cataluña (Organic Law 6/2006). Official State Gazette (in Spanish). 19 July 2006 [version as of 19 January 2011]. BOE-A-2006-13087.
- Ley 13/2008, de 5 de noviembre, de la presidencia de la Generalidad y del Gobierno (Law 13/2008). Official State Gazette (in Spanish). 5 November 2008 [version as of 20 July 2015]. BOE-A-2008-19526.
- Decreto 174/2015, de 3 de agosto, de convocatoria de elecciones al Parlamento de Cataluña y de su disolución (PDF) (Decree 174/2015). Official Journal of the Government of Catalonia (in Spanish). 3 August 2015. DOGC-B-15215098-2015.
