= Antonio Baños Boncompain =

Spanish journalist, politician and writer

Antonio Baños
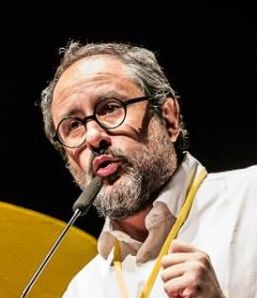
- Antonio Baños in April 2015

Member of the Parliament of Catalonia
- In office 26 October 2015 – 12 January 2016
- Constituency: Barcelona

Personal details
- Born: Antonio Baños Boncompain; 18 April 1967 (age 59) Barcelona, Catalonia, Spain
- Party: Popular Unity Candidacy
- Education: Autonomous University of Barcelona
- Profession: Journalist

Antonio Baños Boncompain (born 1967 in Barcelona, Catalonia) is a Spanish Catalan musician, journalist and writer. In the Catalan parliamentary election of 2015 he led Popular Unity Candidacy – Constituent Call, a pro-independence left-wing electoral list until he resigned in 2016.

Baños has a degree in journalism from the Autonomous University of Barcelona. As a musician he's been a member of the band Los Carradine since 1989 and has released two records: Sospechoso tren de vida (2006) and Academia rocanrol (2016).

He is national secretary of the ANC and speaker of Súmate.

== Publications ==
Baños has written books and several articles, including:

- —— (2009). La economía no existe. Los Libros del Lince. ISBN 9788493703820.
- —— (2012). Posteconomía. Los Libros del Lince. ISBN 9788415070221.
- —— (2013). La rebel·lió catalana. Labutxaca. ISBN 978-84-9930-653-7.
- —— (2016). La cara B, una altra mirada al procés. Pagès. ISBN 978-84-99757834.
- —— (2017). La república possible. Ara llibres. ISBN 978-84-16915194.
