= 2020 Spanish regional elections =

← 2019	12 July 2020	2021 →

150 seats in the regional parliaments of the Basque Country and Galicia
Regional administrations by leading party in 2020
National parties
PSOE (9)
PP (5+1)
Cs (0+1)
Regional parties
JxCat (Note: In July 2020, former Catalan president Carles Puigdemont, incumbent Quim Torra and most members of the Catalan European Democratic Party (PDeCAT) broke away from the latter-led Together for Catalonia (JuntsxCat) alliance and established their own party under the same name.) (1)
EAJ/PNV (1)
PRC (1)

Regional elections were held in Spain during 2020 to elect the regional parliaments of two of the seventeen autonomous communities: the Basque Country and Galicia. 150 of 1,208 seats in the regional parliaments were up for election. The elections were held on 12 July in both regions.

== Election date ==
Determination of election day varied depending on the autonomous community. Typically, most autonomous communities held their elections on the fourth Sunday of May every four years, concurrently with nationwide local elections, while others had their own, separate electoral cycles. In some cases, regional presidents had the prerogative to dissolve parliament and call for extra elections at a different time, but newly elected assemblies were restricted to serving out what remained of their previous four year-terms without altering the period to their next ordinary election. In other cases—Andalusia (since 1994), Aragon (2007), the Balearic Islands (2007), the Basque Country (1981), the Canary Islands (2018), Castile and León (2007), Catalonia (1985), Extremadura (2011), Galicia (1985), Navarre (2010) and the Valencian Community (2006)—the law granted regional presidents the power to call snap elections resulting in fresh four-year parliamentary terms.

== Regional governments ==
The following table lists party control in autonomous communities and cities. Gains for a party are highlighted in that party's colour.

Election day	Region	Previous control	New control
12 July	Basque Country	Basque Nationalist Party (EAJ/PNV)	Basque Nationalist Party (EAJ/PNV)
12 July	Galicia	People's Party (PP)	People's Party (PP)

== Summary by region ==
=== July (2 regions) ===
==== Basque Country ====
Parties and alliances	Votes	%	±pp	Seats	+/−
EAJ/PNV	349,960	38.70	+1.34	31	+3
EH Bildu	249,580	27.60	+6.47	21	+3
PSE–EE (PSOE)	122,248	13.52	+1.66	10	+1
Elkarrekin Podemos	72,113	7.97	−6.79	6	−5
PP+Cs	60,650	6.71	−5.42	6	−3
Vox	17,569	1.94	+1.87	1	+1
Equo Berdeak–Verdes	11,718	1.30	New	0	±0
Others	11,964	1.32		0	±0
Blank ballots	8,540	0.94	+0.31		
Valid votes	904,342	99.26	−0.30		
Invalid votes	6,747	0.74	+0.30		
Votes cast / turnout	911,089	50.78	−9.24		
Registered voters	1,794,316				

==== Galicia ====
Parties and alliances	Votes	%	±pp	Seats	+/−
PP	627,762	47.96	+0.40	42	+1
BNG	311,340	23.79	+15.46	19	+13
PSdeG–PSOE	253,750	19.39	+1.52	14	±0
Podemos–EU–Anova	51,630	3.94	−15.13	0	−14
Vox	26,797	2.05	New	0	±0
Others	25,896	1.98		0	±0
Blank ballots	11,774	0.90	−0.08		
Valid votes	1,308,949	99.09	+0.09		
Invalid votes	12,006	0.91	−0.09		
Votes cast / turnout	1,320,955	48.97	−4.66		
Registered voters	2,697,490				

== Bibliography ==
- Ley Orgánica 5/1985, de 19 de junio, del Régimen Electoral General (Organic Law 5/1985). Official State Gazette (in Spanish). 19 June 1985 [version as of 25 June 2019]. BOE-A-1985-11672.
