= Anticapitalistas =

Anticapitalists Anticapitalistas
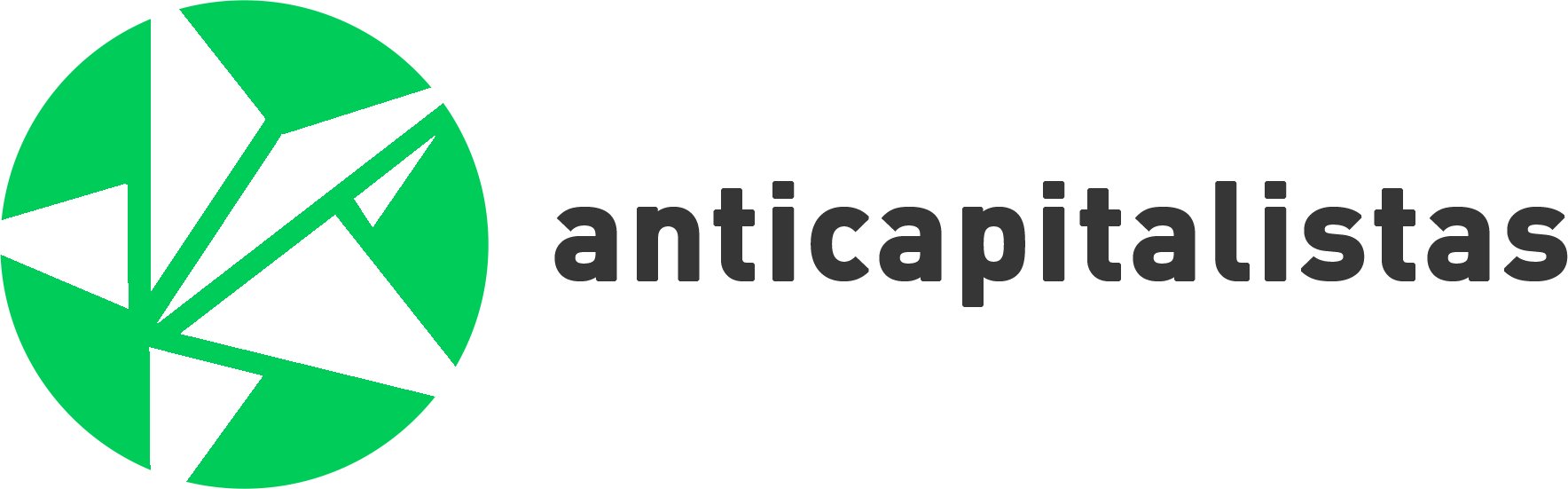
- Founded: 1995
- Newspaper: Poder Popular
- Ideology: Socialism; Anti-capitalism; Republicanism; Trotskyism
- Political position: Left-wing to far-left
- National affiliation: United Left (1995–2008); Podemos (2014–2020)
- Regional affiliation: Adelante Andalucía (2020) (Note: 2018 coalition); Adelante Andalucía (2021–present)
- European affiliation: European Anti-Capitalist Left
- International affiliation: Fourth International (post-reunification)
- Colours: Green
- Parliament of Andalusia: 1 / 109

Website
- anticapitalistas.org

Anticapitalistas (Catalan: Anticapitalistes, Basque: Antikapitalistak, English: Anticapitalists), known as Izquierda Anticapitalista (Anti-Capitalist Left, IA) until January 2015 and as Espacio Alternativo (Alternative Space, EA) from 1995 to November 2008, is a socialist political organisation that works as a confederation in Spain. Anticapitalistas is defined as a revolutionary socialist, anti-capitalist, proletarian internationalist, republican, and eco-socialist organisation, assuming Marxism in an open, plural, and critical sense. Its stated objective is the rebuilding of the revolutionary project through the creation of a unitary, anti-capitalist political expression sustained by the anti-globalisation movement, the labor movement, and the social movements at large. It is a member of the Fourth International (post-reunification), a Trotskyist international organisation reformed in 1963.

On 23 February 2009, IA entered in the register of political parties of the Interior Ministry, and presented candidacies to several elections. In January 2015, IA decided to become the Anticapitalistas political association and join Podemos, which lasted until 2020.

== History ==
=== Espacio Alternativo ===
Anticapitalistas was founded in 1995 under the name Espacio Alternativo (Alternative Space) by former militants of the Revolutionary Communist League (LCR), after its failed union with the Communist Movement, in the project Alternative Left, joined United Left (IU). By then, EA also had the support of some ecosocialists. Subsequently, the organisation gained members in and out of IU. However, EA progressively lost weight as an internal current of IU, mainly due to the rupture with the ecosocialist sectors that originally participated in its foundation. Some prominent leaders of IU linked to EA abandoned the current in the early 2000s, for example, Julio Setién, Oskar Matute or Concha Denche. EA was, de facto, an external organisation towards IU.

EA held the 5th confederal meeting in December 2007, abandoning IU.

== Organisation ==
Anticapitalistas is an organisation composed of various territorial organisations, the majority federated and three confederated: Esquerda Anticapitalista in Galiza, Antikapitalistak (in the Southern Basque Country) and Revolta Global-Esquerra Anticapitalista (in Catalonia and the Balearic Islands).

== Publications ==
Its organ of expression is the Corriente Alterna magazine, The youths of Anticapitalistas periodically publish a magazine called Combate Estudiantil. Several members also have a strong presence on the editorial board of the Marxist analysis magazine Viento Sur.

== Summer University ==
Every year, Anticapitalistas organises the Summer University of the Anticapitalist Left, which brings together hundreds of people, including members and sympathisers. The 2013 edition was attended by Juan Carlos Monedero, Pablo Iglesias Turrión, Martiño Noriega, Sabino Cuadra, Esther Vivas and Jaime Pastor. The 2015 edition was attended by the Anticapitalistas European MPs Miguel Urbán and Lola Sánchez Caldentey, Katerina Sergidou, Pedro Santisteve (mayor of Zaragoza), José María González Santos Kichi (mayor of Cádiz), Albano Dante Fachín (leader of Podemos in Catalonia), Jaime Pastor, Beatriz Gimeno, Teresa Rodríguez, Teresa Forcades, Antón Sánchez and Rommy Arce (member of the Municipal Council of Madrid, of Anticapitalistas and Ahora Madrid).

== Relation with other movements ==
Anticapitalistas prioritizes working in left-wing citizen platforms and in the anti-globalization movement. Its field of political intervention lies in the social movements, environmentalist, student movement, decent housing and the anti-evictions movement), in the trade union movement (in the mareas that defend public and common services and in Comisiones Obreras and other unions) and also works in neighborhood associations and popular assemblies.

== Prominent members ==
- Teresa Rodríguez, leader of Adelante Andalusia.
- José María González Santos Kichi, mayor of Cádiz.
- Miguel Urbán Crespo, MEP of Unidas Podemos in the European Parliament.
- Laura Camargo, spokesperson of Podemos in the Balearic Islands.
- Raúl Camargo, Beatriz Gimeno e Isabel Serra, representatives in the Assembly of Madrid (2015–2019).
- Rommy Arce, city councillor in Madrid (2015–2019).
- Andreu Escobar, general secretary of Podemos in Badalona.

== International relations ==
Anticapitalistas is a member of the European Anti-Capitalist Left, a heterogeneous network of socialist political groups of various tendencies that have a Marxist inspiration. Anticapitalistas also participates in the United Secretariat of the Fourth International (post-reunification), considered itself the heir of the former LCR and the historic POUM.

The technological platform created by Nodo50 was its way of communicating with other movements.
