= Miguel Urbán =

Spanish activist and politician (born 1980)

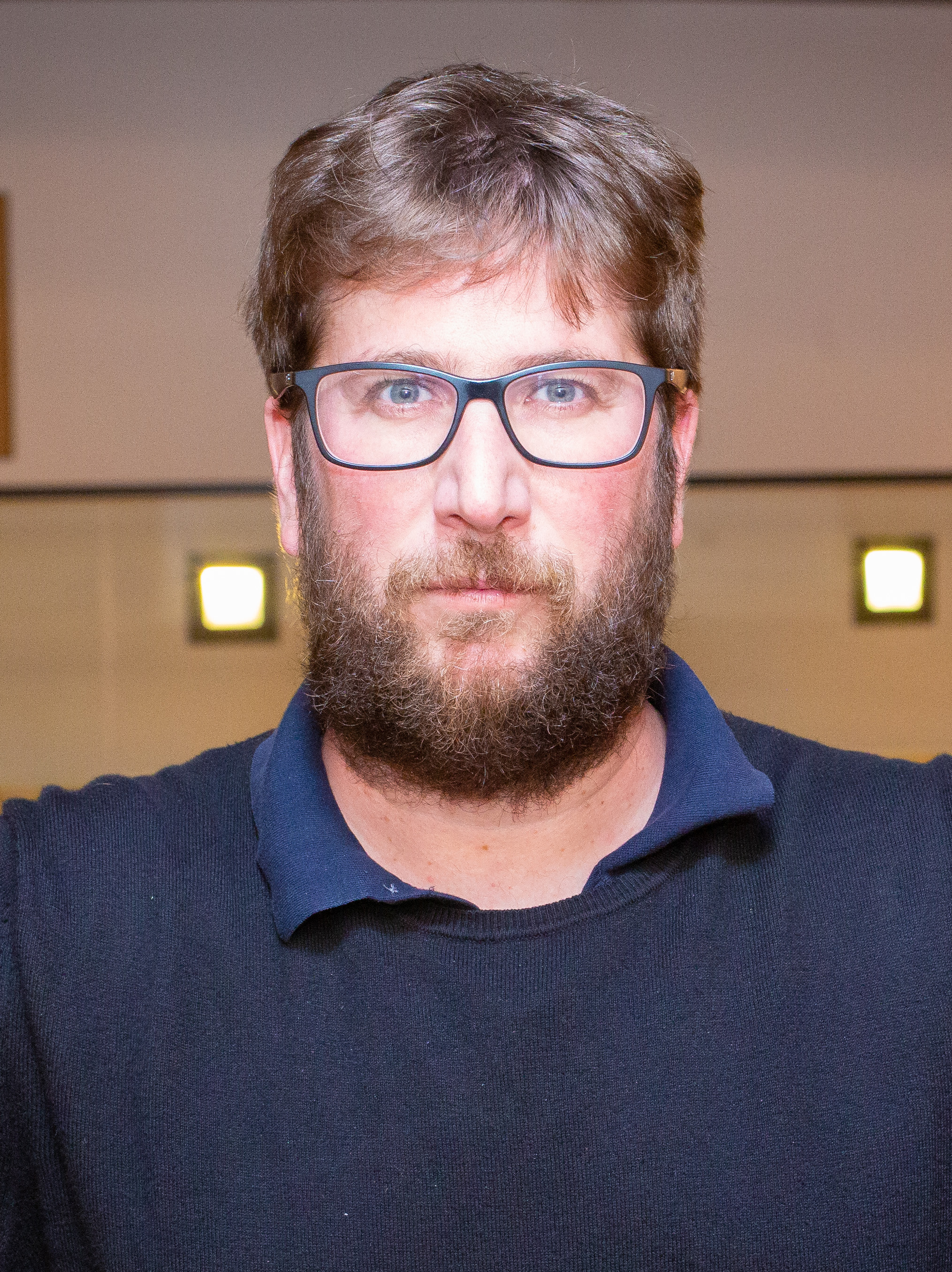

Member of the European Parliament
- In office 5 March 2015 – 16 July 2024
- Constituency: Spain

Personal details
- Born: 26 March 1980 (age 46) Madrid, Spain
- Party: Podemos (2014–2020); Anticapitalistas
- Education: Complutense University of Madrid
- Occupation: Politician, activist, librarian

Miguel Urbán Crespo (Spanish pronunciation: [miˈɣel uɾˈβan]; born 26 March 1980) is a Spanish activist and politician. A longstanding figure of the Trotskyist Izquierda Anticapitalista platform (renamed as Anticapitalistas after 2015) and co-founder of Podemos, he served as Member of the European Parliament from 2015 to 2024, integrated within the European United Left–Nordic Green Left political group.

== Biography ==
Born on 26 March 1980 en Madrid, he is son of Luis Miguel Urbán Fernández, a member of the trotskyist Revolutionary Communist League who suffered torture enacted by Billy el Niño in Francoist Spain. He studied history at the Complutense University of Madrid (UCM), although he did not graduate. Urban worked as librarian in La Marabunta.

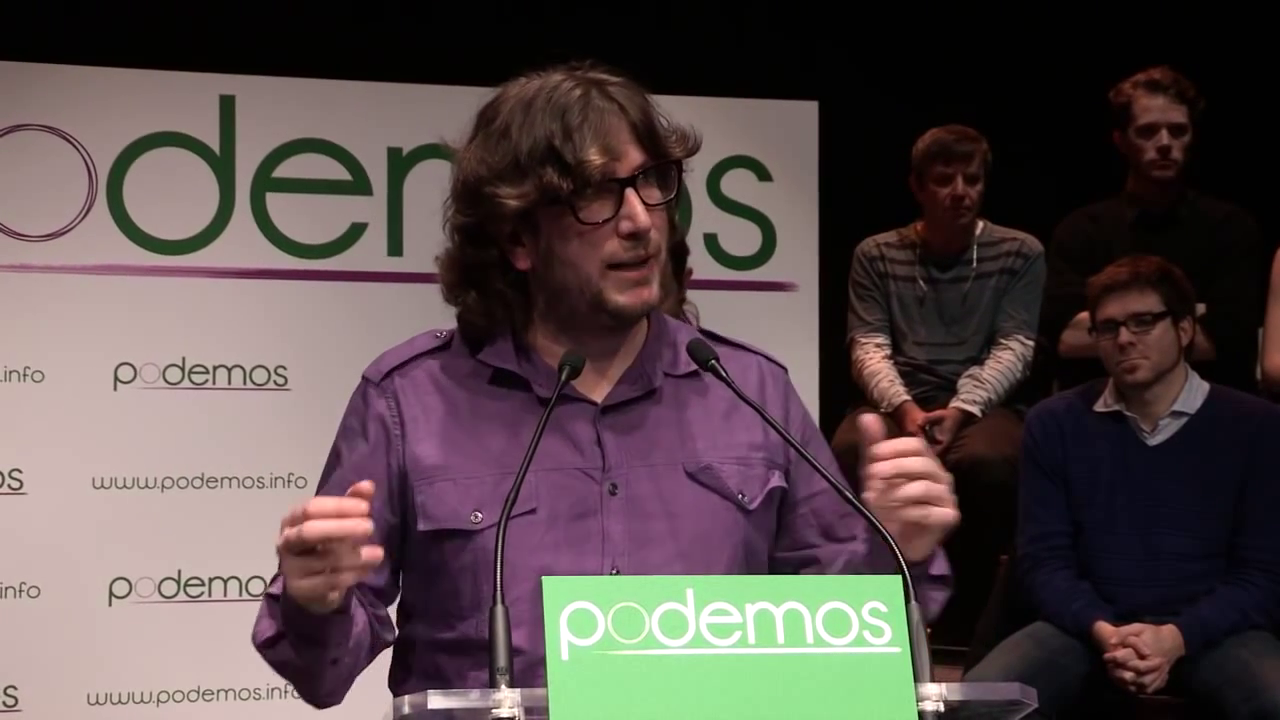
Urbán during the presentation of Podemos in January 2014

He ran in the 20th place of the Anticapitalist Left-Global Revolt list vis-à-vis the 2009 European Parliament election in Spain. He led the trotskyist Anticapitalist Left (IA) list in Madrid to the Congress of Deputies in the 2011 general election.

One of the most prominent figures of IA, he helped to give form along 2013 through conversations with Pablo Iglesias to the main idea of the project that would become Podemos, tensions between the anticapitalistas and the UCM lecturers notwithstanding. On 17 January 2014, he was among the partakers of the event at the Teatro del Barrio in Lavapiés that presented the Mover ficha manifesto, the foundational text of Podemos.

He was included 7th in the Podemos list for the 2014 European Parliament election. Following the renouncements of Carlos Jiménez Villarejo and Teresa Rodríguez to their respective seats, Urbán became an MEP on 5 March 2015. He served as member of the Committee on Industry, Research and Energy (ITRE; 2015) and the Committee on Foreign Affairs (AFET; 2015–2019), as well as in the Subcommittee on Human Rights (DROI) the Delegation for relations with the Maghreb countries and the Arab Maghreb Union and the Delegation to the Parliamentary Assembly of the Union for the Mediterranean.

He ran as a Unidas Podemos Cambiar Europa electoral coalition list candidate for the 2019 European Parliament election in Spain, being re-elected to the European Parliament for the 2019–2024 term. He joined the Committee on Development (EVE) and the DROI as well as the Delegation for relations with Mercosur (DMER) and the Delegation to the Euro-Latin American Parliamentary Assembly (DLAT).

In February 2020, Urbán left Podemos alongside the platform Anticapitalistas, heir to Anticapitalist Left and hitherto integrated within the party.

On 2 March 2022, he was one of 13 MEPs who voted against the resolution condemning the Russian invasion of Ukraine and for arming Ukraine.

In January 2023, Miguel Urban commented on the ongoing Qatargate scandal, “The Qatargate scandal points to an even deeper Moroccogate affair. The European Parliament should take the same precautionary measures with Morocco as it did with Qatar. Every European Parliament legislative activity in recent years involving Moroccan interests should be retrospectively reviewed to ensure that it has not been influenced by foreign interference.”

== Works ==
- — (2014). El viejo fascismo y la nueva derecha radical. Barcelona: Sylone.
- — (2020). La emergencia de Vox. Apuntes para combatir a la extrema derecha española. Barcelona: Sylone.
