= Sabino Cuadra =

Spanish attorney and politician

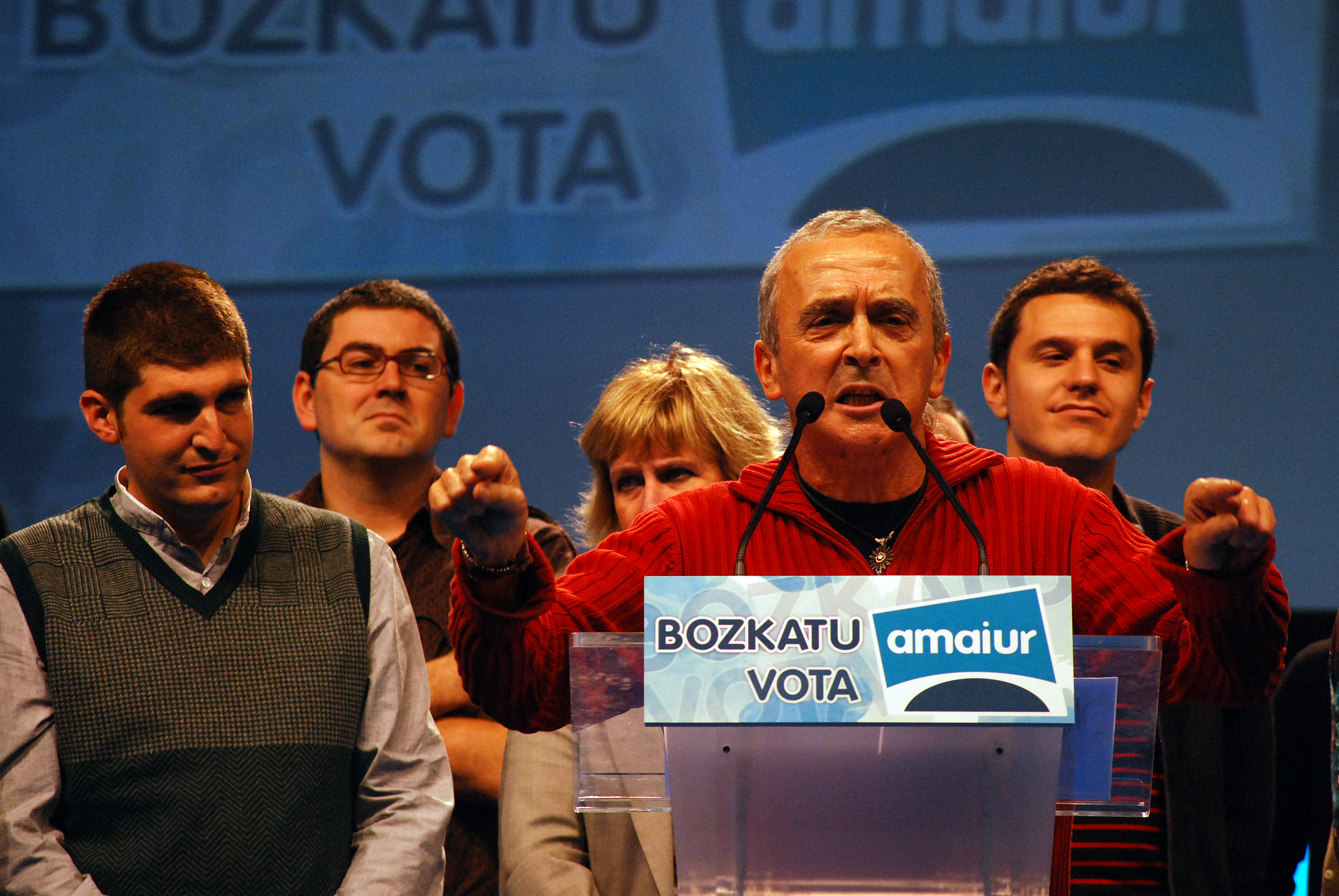

Deputy in the Cortes Generales
- In office 21 November 2011 – 27 October 2015

Personal details
- Born: 24 May 1949 (age 76) Amurrio, Álava, Spain
- Party: Amaiur
- Other political affiliations: Liga Komunista Iraultzailea; Auzolan; Batzarre; Euskal Herritarrok; Iruñea Berria; Herritarren Zerrenda
- Occupation: Politician

Sabino Cuadra Lasarte (born 24 May 1949) is a Spanish Basque attorney and politician. He is a member of Amaiur and is a strong supporter of the independence of the Basque Country. He has been a member of the Spanish Congress of Deputies since 2011.
