= Nodo50 =

Spanish internet provider

Nodo50 is a non-profit internet service provider. It is an autonomous telematic alternative information project aimed at social movements. It provides computer and communication services to individuals, collectives and left-wing, anti-capitalist and anti-fascist organisations in Spain and Latin America. The project is managed by the association "Nodo50: Altavoz por la Libertad de Expresión y Comunicación".

== History ==
It began as a communication tool for the "Foro 50 años bastan", a meeting against the IMF and World Bank celebration in Madrid in 1994, which was promoted by the NGO Sodepaz. The tool received technical support from Alberto J. Jiménez of BBS Revolware and Russell Gasser.

At the time, Nodo50 was running the Waffle software on the DESQview multitasking platform. It exchanged emails with the GreenNet server in London using the UUCP protocol via a hacked Telnet connection. At the same time, the IPANEX association was the co-ordinator of similar projects on the continent. In 1996, with European funding from the EPITELIO project, it made the leap to the Internet through InfoVía. Since then, it has been working on a variety of campaigns, actions, projects and congresses, together with a variety of social movements and political organisations.

== Members ==
Nodo50's members include a wide range of left-wing movements such as environmentalism (Ecologistas en Acción), anti-militarism (Grupo Antimilitarista Tortuga), pacifism, feminism (Mujeres en Red), trade unionism (sections of the CGT, CNT or CCOO), free and community radio (Radio Vallekas), liberation theology, social centres, defence of public services and social welfare; in general, sites advocating socialism or anti-globalisation.

It also provides services to some political parties, such as Corriente Roja, Izquierda Anticapitalista, Izquierda Comunera and Izquierda Unida, and some NGOs, such as Amnesty International (local group in Cordoba, Spain).

In 2012, the list of organisations hosted by Node50 includes around 1,170.

== Servers ==
They have been in Sweden since 2011 for further security guarantees.
