= Ahotsa.info =

Spanish online newspaper

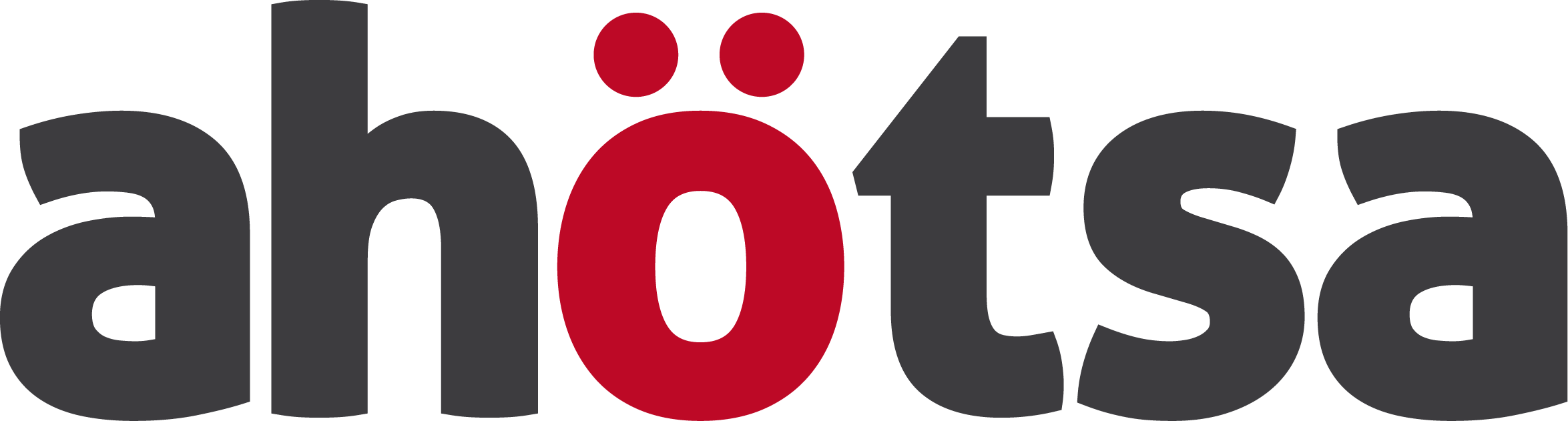
- Founded: 2014
- Language: Spanish

Ahotsa.info is a Spanish online newspaper covering Navarre. It was founded in 2014 and crowdfunded. After the closure of Apurtu.org and Ateak Ireki ordered by the Audiencia Nacional and the later dismissal of the case, a group initiated the Ahotsa.info project to give continuity to the work of the previously closed media outlets.

== Obstacles to coverage ==
Ahotsa.info has often encountered obstacles to cover protests in Navarre. In March 2014, the National Police Corps attacked a cameraman of Ahotsa.info while covering student protests against the new education law (LOMCE). In 2015, after publishing images of National Police agents during the San Fermín festival, the delegate of the Government Carmen Alba Orduna, sent a letter to Ahotsa.info warning that the new Law of Citizen Security would be applied if they published images of police agents again. In June 2016, a cameraman covering a protest against political corruption in the headquarters of the Socialist Party of Navarre was fined with 540 euros accused of being a "promoter and responsible for the protest."

On 13 July 2018, National Police subpoenaed a member of Ahotsa.info for alleged apology for terrorism. She was released after refusing to declare. The Attorney investigated the media outlet because two news pieces about the prisoners association Euskal Preso Politikoen Kolektiboa (EPPK) where they were referred to as "basque political prisoners." In April 2019 the Ahotsa.info member declared to the Audiencia Nacional through videoconference and was released without charges.
