= Catalunya Sí que es Pot =

Former electoral alliance in Spain

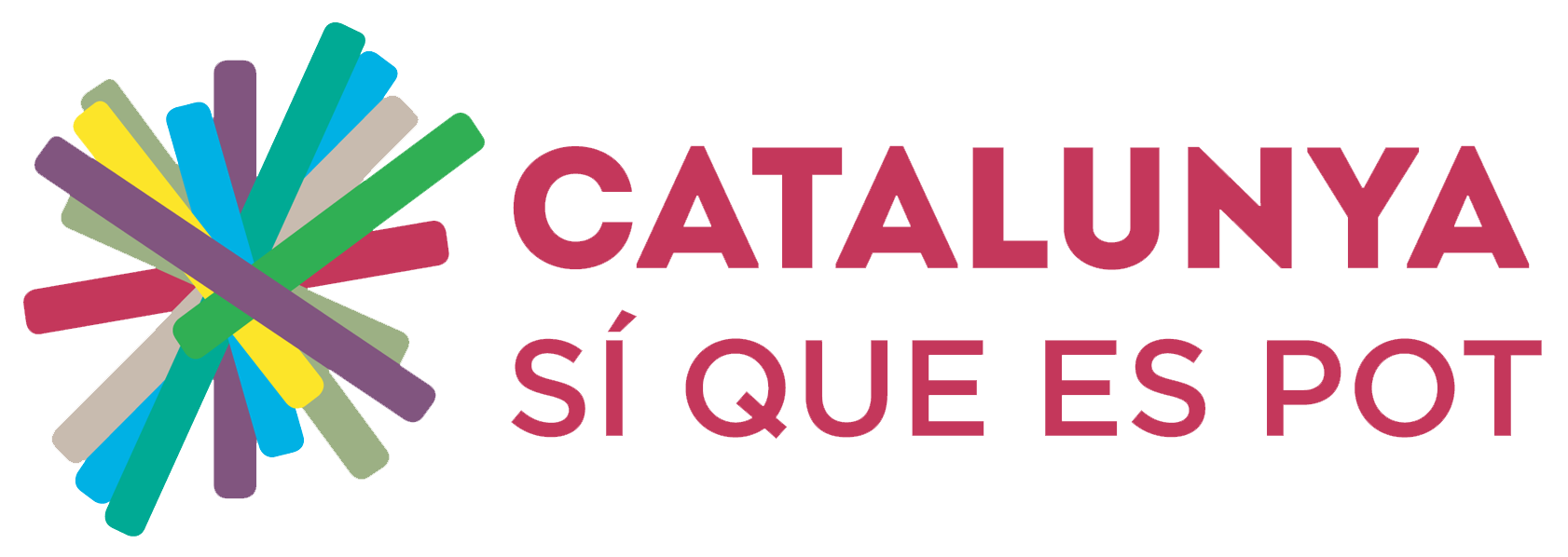
- Spokesperson: Lluís Rabell
- Founded: 15 July 2015
- Dissolved: 2017
- Merger of: Podem; ICV; EUiA; Equo
- Preceded by: ICV–EUiA
- Succeeded by: En Comú Podem; Catalunya en Comú–Podem
- Ideology: Left-wing populism Environmentalism; Social justice Catalan right of self-determination
- Political position: Left-wing

Website
- catalunyasiqueespot.cat

Catalunya Sí que es Pot (English: "Catalonia Yes We Can", also translated as "Catalonia It Is Possible" or "Yes, Catalonia Can") was a left-wing coalition composed of Podem, Initiative for Catalonia Greens (ICV) and United and Alternative Left (EUiA). It was formed in 2015 to stand in the Catalan election scheduled for 27 September that year.

CSQP secured 367,613 votes (8.94% of the vote) and 11 seats in the 2015 Catalan election.

== Composition ==
Party
We Can (Podem)
Initiative for Catalonia Greens (ICV)
United and Alternative Left (EUiA)
Equo (Equo)

== Electoral performance ==
=== Parliament of Catalonia ===
Parliament of Catalonia
Election	Leading candidate	Votes	%	Seats	Gov.
2015	Lluís Rabell	367,613	8.9 (#4)	11 / 135	No
