= Government of Carles Puigdemont =

Puigdemont's Catalonia government (2016-2017)

Puigdemont Government
- 17th Executive Council of Catalonia
- 2016–2017
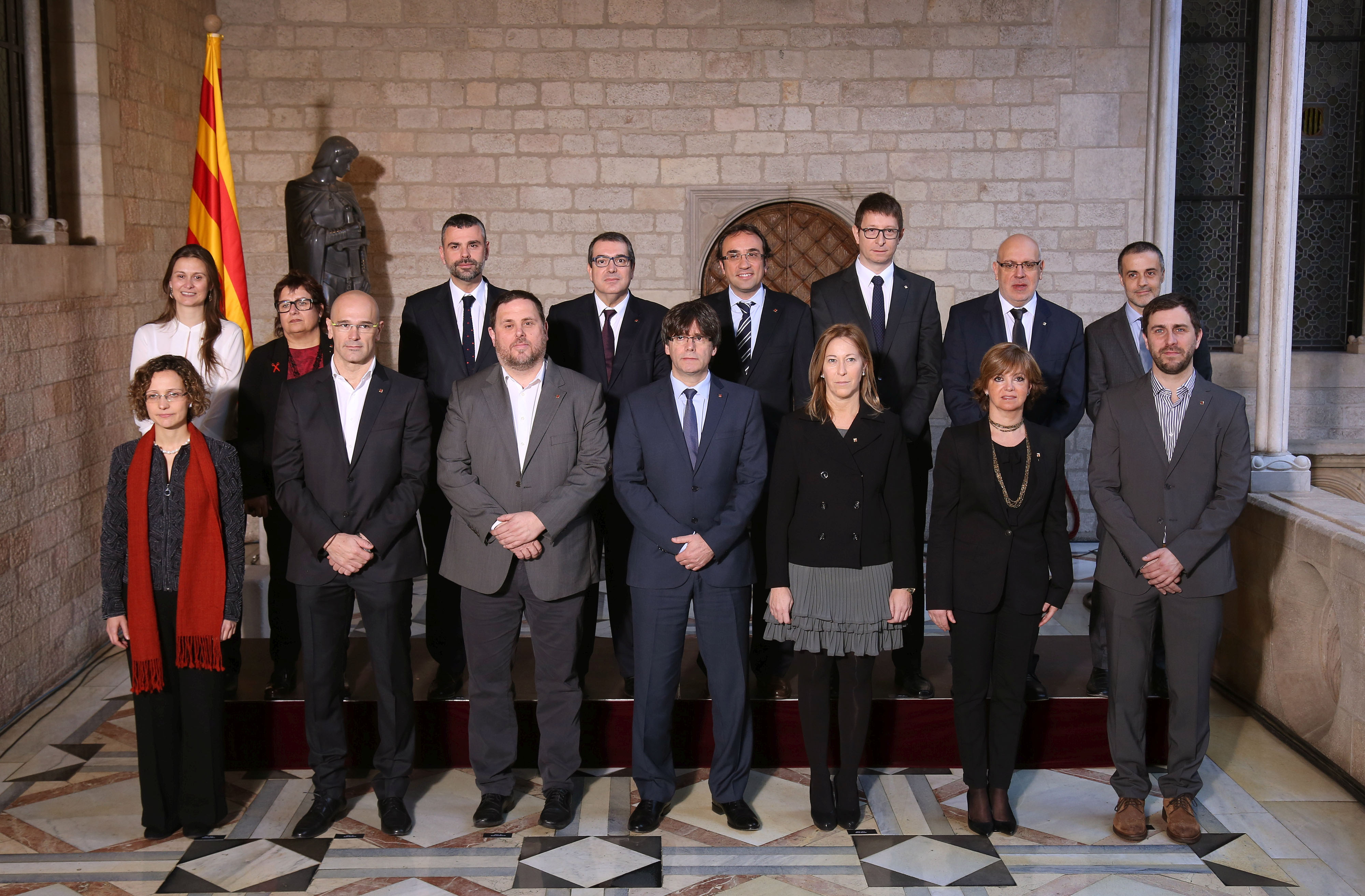
- The government in January 2016
- Date formed: 11 January 2016
- Date dissolved: 27 October 2017

People and organisations
- Head of government: Carles Puigdemont
- Deputy head of government: Oriol Junqueras
- No. of ministers: 13
- Member party: Junts pel Sí CDC (Note: CDC was "refounded" into the Catalan European Democratic Party (PDeCAT), which assumed CDC's political activity, but CDC was not legally dissolved nor its trademark removed from the electoral register and retains full legal personality.); PdeCAT (Note: Catalan European Democratic Party from July 2016.); ERC; Independents
- Status in legislature: Minority (coalition)
- Opposition party: Cs
- Opposition leader: Inés Arrimadas

History
- Incoming formation: 2015–16 Catalan government formation
- Outgoing formation: Application of Article 155 of the Spanish Constitution and Direct Rule
- Election: 2015 regional election
- Outgoing election: 2017 regional election
- Legislature term: XI Legislature (2015–2017)
- Budget: 2017
- Predecessor: Mas II
- Successor: Torra

The Puigdemont Government was the regional government of Catalonia led by President Carles Puigdemont between 2016 and 2017. It was formed in January 2016 after the resignation of Puigdemont's predecessor Artur Mas and it ended in October 2017 with the imposition of direct rule following the Catalan declaration of independence.

== History ==
Following the 2015 regional election incumbent president Artur Mas failed to receive enough support in Parliament to continue in office and was forced to resign in January 2016. An agreement was reached between pro-Catalan independence parties Junts pel Sí (JxSí) and Popular Unity Candidacy (CUP) to replace Mas with Carles Puigdemont. At the investiture vote held on 10 January 2016 Puigdemont secured 70 votes (JxSí 62; CUP 8) with 63 votes against (Cs 25; PSC 16; CatSíqueesPot 11; PP 11) and two abstentions (CUP 2), exceeding the 68 votes necessary for an absolute majority.

Investiture of Carles Puigdemont (CDC)	Yes		No		Abstentions	
10 January 2016 (1st ballot) (68/135 required)	70	• JxSí (62) • CUP (8)	63	• C's (25) • PSC (16) • CatSíqueesPot (11) • PP (11)	2	• CUP (2)
Source: historiaelectoral.com

In June 2017 Puigdemont announced that a referendum on Catalan independence would be held on 1 October 2017. The Catalan Parliament passed legislation on 6 September 2017 authorising the referendum which would be binding and based on a simple majority without a minimum threshold. The following day Constitutional Court of Spain suspended the legislation, blocking the referendum. The Spanish government put into effect Operation Anubis in order to disrupt the organisation of the referendum and arrested Catalan government officials. Despite this the referendum went ahead though it was boycotted by unionists and turnout was only 43%. 92% of those who voted supported independence. Around 900 people were injured as the Spanish police used violence to try to prevent voting in the referendum.

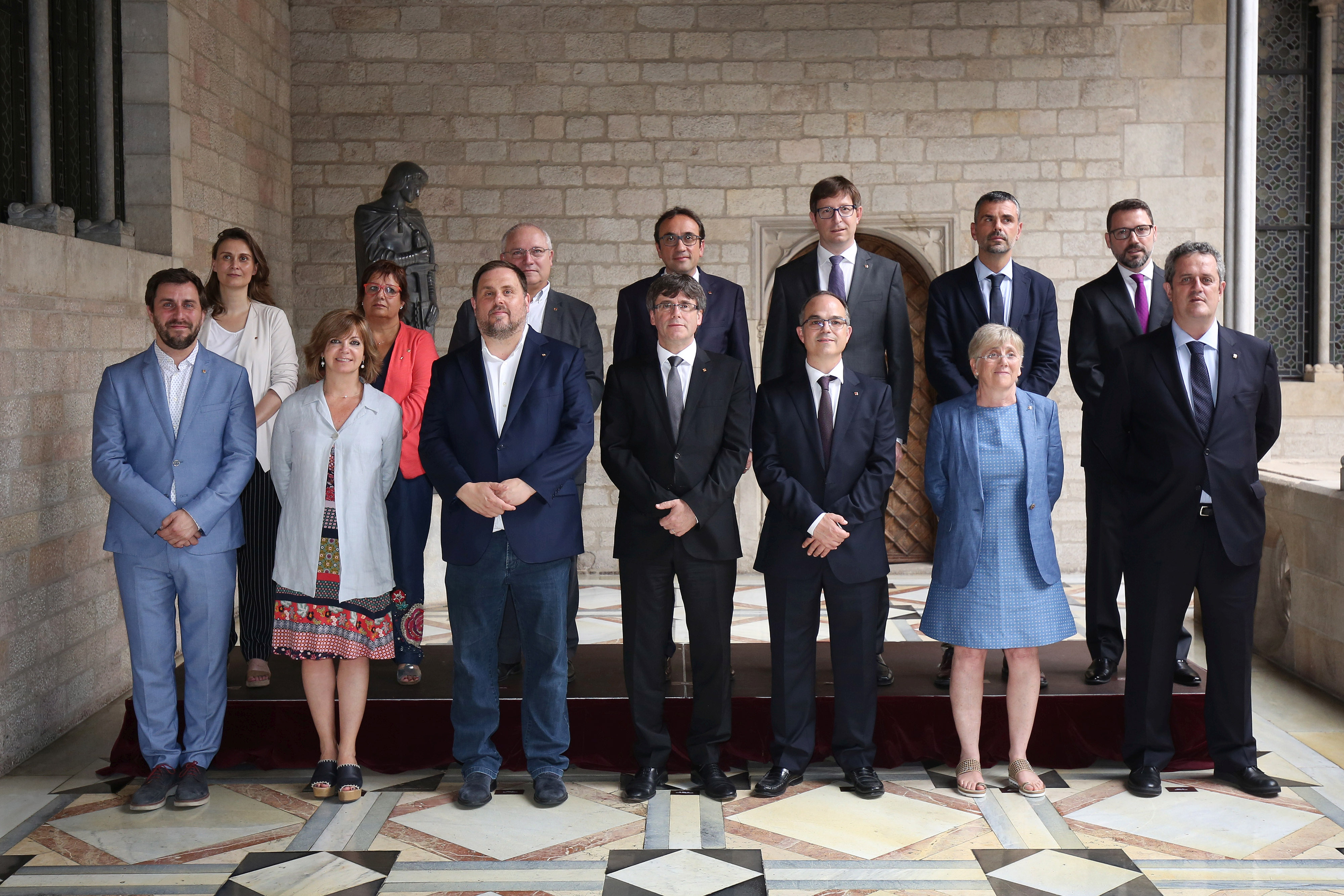
The government in July 2017

On 27 October 2017 the Catalan Parliament declared independence in a vote boycotted by opposition MPs. Almost immediately the Senate of Spain invoked article 155 of the constitution, dismissing Puigdemont and the Catalan government and imposing direct rule on Catalonia. The following day Spanish Prime Minister Mariano Rajoy dissolved the Catalan Parliament and called for fresh regional elections on 21 December 2017.

Puigdemont's cabinet governed Catalonia from 11 January 2016 to 27 October 2017, a total of 655 days, or 1 year, 9 months and 16 days. It was composed of members of Democratic Convergence of Catalonia (which was dissolved on 8 July 2016, replaced by the Catalan European Democratic Party on 10 July 2016), Republican Left of Catalonia, and some independents, all part of the JxSí electoral alliance.

== Executive Council ==
The Executive Council consisted of 13 conselleries (ministers) — not including the post of the President — as well as one vice president.

=== Original members ===
Portrait	Name	Office	Took office	Left office	Party	Refs
	Carles Puigdemont	President	11 January 2016	27 October 2017	Democratic Convergence of Catalonia	
	Oriol Junqueras	Vice President Minister of Economy and Finance	13 January 2016	27 October 2017	Republican Left of Catalonia	
	Jordi Baiget	Minister of Enterprise and Knowledge	13 January 2016	3 July 2017	Democratic Convergence of Catalonia	
	Dolors Bassa	Minister of Social Welfare, Employment and Family	13 January 2016	27 October 2017	Republican Left of Catalonia	
	Meritxell Borràs	Minister of Governance, Public Administration and Housing	13 January 2016	27 October 2017	Democratic Convergence of Catalonia	
	Antoni Comín	Minister of Health	13 January 2016	27 October 2017	Independent	
	Jordi Jané	Minister of the Interior	13 January 2016	14 July 2017	Democratic Convergence of Catalonia	
	Carles Mundó	Minister of Justice	13 January 2016	27 October 2017	Republican Left of Catalonia	
	Neus Munté	Minister of Presidency Spokesperson of the Government	13 January 2016	14 July 2017	Democratic Convergence of Catalonia	
	Raül Romeva	Minister of Foreign Affairs, Institutional Relations, and Transparency	13 January 2016	27 October 2017	Independent	
	Meritxell Ruiz	Minister of Education	13 January 2016	14 July 2017	Democratic Convergence of Catalonia	
	Josep Rull	Minister of Planning and Sustainability	13 January 2016	27 October 2017	Democratic Convergence of Catalonia	
	Meritxell Serret	Minister of Agriculture, Livestock, Fisheries and Food	13 January 2016	27 October 2017	Republican Left of Catalonia	
	Santi Vila	Minister of Culture	13 January 2016	3 July 2017	Democratic Convergence of Catalonia	

=== Member changes ===
Portrait	Name	Office	Took office	Left office	Party	Refs
	Santi Vila	Minister of Enterprise and Knowledge	3 July 2017	27 October 2017	Catalan European Democratic Party	
	Lluís Puig	Minister of Culture	4 July 2017	27 October 2017	Catalan European Democratic Party	
	Jordi Turull	Minister of Presidency Spokesperson of the Government	14 July 2017	27 October 2017	Catalan European Democratic Party	
	Joaquim Forn	Minister of the Interior	14 July 2017	27 October 2017	Catalan European Democratic Party	
	Clara Ponsatí	Minister of Education	14 July 2017	27 October 2017	Independent	
	Josep Rull	Minister of Enterprise and Knowledge (acting)	27 October 2017	27 October 2017	Catalan European Democratic Party	
