= Joaquim Forn =

Catalan politician and lawyer (born 1964)

The Honourable Joaquim Forn
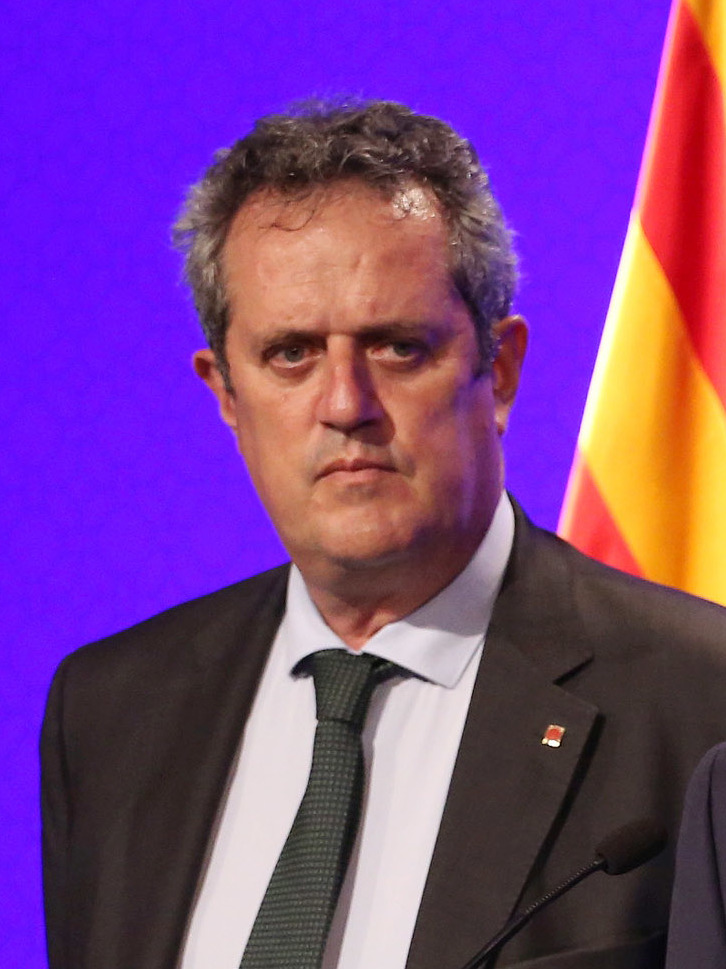
- Forn in August 2017

Minister of the Interior
- In office 14 July 2017 – 27 October 2017
- President: Carles Puigdemont
- Preceded by: Jordi Jané i Guasch
- Succeeded by: Miquel Buch (Direct rule until 2 June 2018)

Member of the Catalan Parliament for the Province of Barcelona
- In office 21 December 2017 – 24 January 2018
- Succeeded by: Antoni Morral i Berenguer

First Deputy Mayor of Barcelona
- In office 2011–2015
- Preceded by: Jordi William Carnes i Ayats
- Succeeded by: Gerardo Pissarello Prados

Councillor of Barcelona
- Incumbent
- Assumed office 15 June 2019
- In office 1999–2017

Personal details
- Born: Joaquim Forn i Chiariello; 1 April 1964 (age 62) Barcelona, Catalonia, Spain
- Citizenship: Spanish
- Party: Together for Catalonia
- Other political affiliations: Catalan European Democratic Party (until 2020); Together for Catalonia (coalition)
- Education: University of Barcelona
- Occupation: Lawyer
- Website: Catalan government in exile

Joaquim Forn i Chiariello (born 1 April 1964) is a Spanish politician and lawyer from Catalonia. A former deputy mayor of the city of Barcelona in north-eastern Spain, Forn served as Minister of the Interior from July 2017 to October 2017 when he was removed from office following the Catalan declaration of independence.

Born in 1964 in Barcelona, Forn graduated from the University of Barcelona before joining the legal profession. A supporter of Catalan independence, Forn joined the nationalist Democratic Convergence of Catalonia (CDC) whilst a student. He was elected to the Municipality Council of Barcelona in 1999 and in 2011 he became the city's first deputy mayor, serving until 2015. He was appointed Minister of the Interior for Catalonia in July 2017.

On 1 October 2017, an independence referendum was held in Catalonia despite the Constitutional Court ruling that it breached the Spanish constitution. 92% supported independence though turnout was only 43% due to a boycott by unionists. The Catalan Parliament declared independence on 27 October 2017 which resulted in the Spanish government imposing direct rule on Catalonia, dismissing the Catalan government, including Forn. The Catalan Parliament was dissolved and fresh elections imposed by central government. On 30 October 2017 charges of rebellion, sedition and misuse of public funds were brought against Forn and other members of the Catalan government. Forn and Puigdemont, along with others, fled to Belgium, but on 31 October 2017 Forn returned to Spain. On 2 November 2017 Forn and seven other Catalan ministers were remanded in custody by the Audiencia Nacional. Six of the ministers were released on bail on 4 December 2017 but Forn and Vice President Oriol Junqueras were kept in custody. At the regional elections held on 21 December 2017 Forn was elected to Parliament and Catalan secessionists retained a slim majority in the Catalan Parliament. Forn resigned from Parliament in January 2018 but remains in prison. During December 2018 he did a hunger strike. On 1 February 2019 he was transferred to a prison in Madrid, waiting for the trial that started on 12 February.

In the 2019 Barcelona City Council election, he was head of the Together for Catalonia candidacy to Mayor of Barcelona. He was not able to participate in the electoral campaign while in prison. The Supreme Court allowed him to collect the councilor's credentials on 14 June and took office on 15 June.

He was pardoned and released, along with the other 8 jailed Catalonia independence leaders, in June 2021.

== Early life and family ==
Forn was born on 1 April 1964 in Barcelona, capital of Catalonia in north eastern Spain. He is the son of a Catalan and an Ecuadorian. After being home schooled, he joined the Lycée Français de Barcelone aged 13, avoiding the Spanish francoist education.

After school Forn joined the University of Barcelona, graduating with a Bachelor of Laws degree. Whilst a student he joined the Democratic Convergence of Catalonia (CDC), a conservative Catalan nationalist political party, now known as the Catalan European Democratic Party (PDeCAT), and helped re-establish the National Student Federation of Catalonia (Federació Nacional d'Estudiants de Catalunya, FNEC), a Catalan nationalist student organisation, serving as its president from 1986 to 1988.

== Career ==
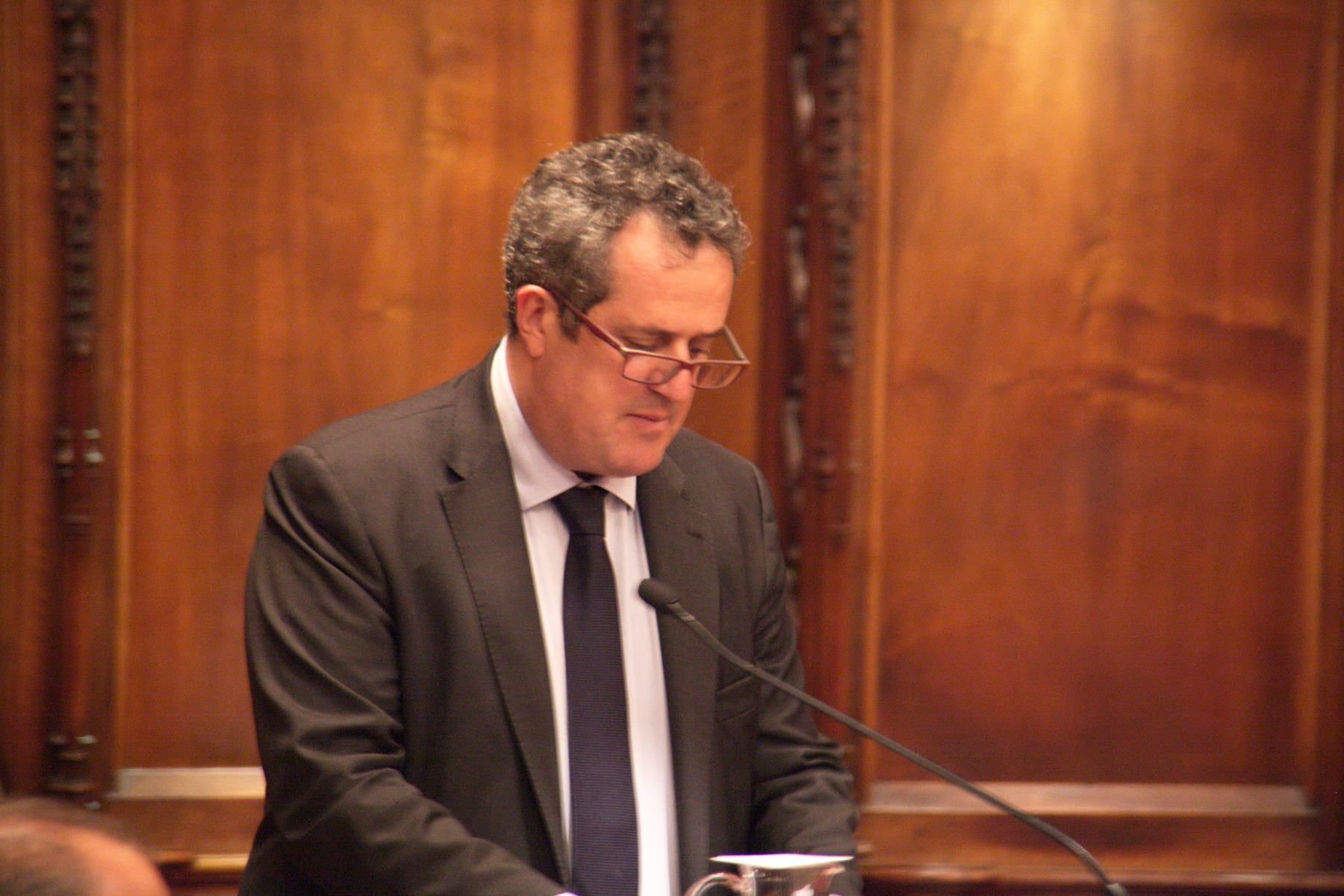
Forn speaking at Barcelona City Council in October 2014

After university Forn started working in a law firm. In 1989 he joined the Acció Olímpica (Olympic Action) group that organised the Freedom for Catalonia campaign during the 1992 Olympic Games in Barcelona.

Forn contested the 1999 local elections as a Convergence and Union (CiU) electoral alliance candidate in Barcelona and was elected. In May 2000 he was beaten and his arm broken by the National Police Corps (Policía Nacional) as he took part in a demonstration against a Spanish Army parade on Montjuïc, in the Sants district of Barcelona, celebrating Armed Forces Day (Día de las Fuerzas Armadas). He was re-elected at the 2003 and 2007 local elections. He was CiU group spokesman on the city council from 2007 to 2011. At the 2011 local elections, in which Forn we re-elected, the CiU ended the Socialists's 32-year rule in Barcelona and Forn became first deputy mayor. He was spokesman of the city government, president of Transports Metropolitans de Barcelona, vice-president of the Autoritat del Transport Metropolità's board of directors, and an advisor and member of the Àrea Metropolitana de Barcelona's board of governors.

Forn was re-elected at the 2015 local elections but the CiU lost control of Barcelona to Barcelona en Comú. He was appointed Minister of the Interior for Catalonia in July 2017. During his office, the 17 August 2017 terrorist attacks occurred.

=== Catalonia independence crisis ===
In June 2017 President of Catalonia Carles Puigdemont announced that a referendum on Catalan independence would be held on 1 October 2017. The Catalan Parliament passed legislation on 6 September 2017 authorising the referendum which would be binding and based on a simple majority without a minimum threshold. The following day Constitutional Court of Spain suspended the legislation, blocking the referendum. The Spanish government put into effect Operation Anubis in order to disrupt the organisation of the referendum and arrested Catalan government officials. Despite this the referendum went ahead though it was boycotted by unionists and turnout was only 43%. 92% of those who voted supported independence. Around 900 people were injured as the Spanish police used violence to try to prevent voting in the referendum.

On 27 October 2017 the Catalan Parliament declared independence in a vote boycotted by opposition MPs. Almost immediately the Senate of Spain invoked article 155 of the constitution, dismissing Puigdemont and the Catalan government and imposing direct rule on Catalonia. The following day Spanish Prime Minister Mariano Rajoy dissolved the Catalan Parliament and called for fresh regional elections on 21 December 2017. On 30 October 2017 Spanish Attorney General José Manuel Maza laid charges of rebellion, sedition and misuse of public funds at the Audiencia Nacional against Puigdemont, Forn and other members of the Catalan government. The charges carry maximum sentences of 30, 15 and 6 years in prison respectively.

Forn, Puigdemont and four other Catalan ministers (Dolors Bassa, Meritxell Borràs, Antoni Comín and Meritxell Serret) arrived in Belgium on 30 October 2017. According to Spanish media the group had driven to Marseille shortly after the charges were laid before the Audiencia Nacional and from there flown to Brussels. Forn and Bassa flew back to Barcelona on 31 October 2017 where they were met at El Prat Airport by a group of Spanish nationalists hurling abuse and taunting the former ministers. The flag waving group shouted "off to prison", "dogs", "traitors" and "where is your republic?" through megaphones and pursued Forn as he left the airport, causing the Mossos d'Esquadra to intervene.

=== Imprisonment ===
On 2 November 2017 Audiencia Nacional judge Carmen Lamela remanded in custody Forn and seven other Catalan ministers (Bassa, Borrás, Oriol Junqueras, Carles Mundó, Raül Romeva, Josep Rull and Jordi Turull) as she considered them a flight risk. The jailed ministers were separated and sent to five different prisons: Bassa and Borrás to Alcalá, Junqueras and Forn to Estremera, Mundó to Aranjuez prison, Romeva and Turull to Valdemoro and Rull to Navalcarnero. A ninth minister, Santi Vila, was freed on bail as he had resigned from the government the day before the declaration of independence, but had to spend a night in Estremera prison whilst his lawyers secured his €50,000 bail. According to their lawyer Jaume Alonso-Cuevillas, the ministers were mistreated whilst being transported to prison. They were allegedly handcuffed behind their backs without seat belts in a van going very fast, forced to listen to the Spanish national anthem on a loop and threatened by their guards. Mundo allegedly suffered injuries due to the handcuffs and two ministers were allegedly forced to strip to prevent them carrying anything into prison. Earlier, as the ministers arrived at the Audiencia Nacional, Spanish police officers were shown, in video obtained Reuters and published by the La Vanguardia, making sneering, homophobic comments about the ministers, with one officer saying "Wait till you see what they do to the little teddy bear", referring to Junqueras, "When they get him on all fours, they’ll fix his eye".

On 1 December 2017 the eight jailed ministers and two jailed independence activists - Jordi Cuixart and Jordi Sànchez i Picanyol - appeared before Supreme Court judge Pablo Llarena to request bail while they await trial. They renounced the declaration of independence, pledged support for the imposition of direct rule and agreed to work within the law. On 4 December 2017 Llarena released, after 32 days in prison, six of the ministers (Bassa, Borrás, Mundó, Romeva, Rull and Turull) on bail of €100,000 but ordered that their passports be confiscated. However, Forn and Junqueras, together with Cuixart and Sànchez, were refused bail. In denying them bail, Llarena claimed that it remained to be seen if their pledge to abide by Spanish law was "truthful and real" and that there was a risk that they would commit the same crimes if released.

Whilst remaining in prison, Forn contested the 2017 regional election as a Together for Catalonia (JuntsxCat) electoral alliance candidate in the Province of Barcelona and was elected to the Parliament of Catalonia. A Christmas crib sent to Forn and Junqueras in prison was returned to its sender Antoni Bargalló smashed and with Viva España scrawled on the box. Cuixart, Forn and Sànchez appeared before Supreme Court judge Pablo Llarena on 11 January 2018 to secure release from prison. At the hearing Forn testified that, although he did not renounce Catalan independence, he would only seek to achieve this by reforming the Spanish constitution and if the Catalan government sought to achieve independence unilaterally he would resign from Parliament. On 12 January 2018, at a separate hearing for Junqueras, Llarena opened the way for the three jailed MPs - Forn, Junqueras and Sànchez - to vote by proxy in the Catalan Parliament. When the Catalan Parliament met on 17 January 2018 it allowed the three jailed MPs to vote by proxy, with Turull voting for Forn and Sànchez. Forn resigned from Parliament with effect from 24 January 2018 in order to secure his freedom. Despite this, on 2 February 2018, Llarena refused Forn's application for release on bail, saying that Forn's refusal to give up support for independence meant that there was a risk that he would re-offend. The testimony by Spanish army colonel Diego Pérez de los Cobos, who was in charge of Spanish security forces during the crackdown against the independence referendum, was seen as key to keeping Forn in prison.

On 7 March 2018 the High Commissioner of the Office of the United Nations High Commissioner for Human Rights reminded Spanish authorities that "pre-trial detention should be considered a measure of last resort" referring to Catalan politicians and activists arrested after the independence referendum.

On 3 December 2018, he went on a hunger strike, ended on 20 December. On 1 February 2019, he was transferred back to a prison in Madrid, expecting trial that started on 12 February. The trial ended and was remitted to decision on 12 June 2019.

On 14 October 2019, he was sentenced to 10 years and six months in prison and disqualification for sedition crime. The verdict was delivered by 7 judges at Spain's supreme court, after a 4-month trial that heard from 422 witnesses.

=== Pardon ===
He was pardoned and released, along with the other 8 jailed Catalonia independence leaders, in June 2021. Prime Minister Pedro Sánchez said that he pardoned them because it was the best decision for Spain and Catalonia, but did not overturn their bans from holding public office.

== Personal life ==
Forn is married to Laura Masvidal. They have two daughters.

== Electoral history ==
Electoral history of Joaquim Forn
| Election | Constituency | Party | Alliance | Result |
|---|---|---|---|---|
| 1999 local | Barcelona | Democratic Convergence of Catalonia | Convergence and Union | Elected |
| 2003 local | Barcelona | Democratic Convergence of Catalonia | Convergence and Union | Elected |
| 2007 local | Barcelona | Democratic Convergence of Catalonia | Convergence and Union | Elected |
| 2011 local | Barcelona | Democratic Convergence of Catalonia | Convergence and Union | Elected |
| 2015 local | Barcelona | Democratic Convergence of Catalonia | Convergence and Union | Elected |
| 2017 regional | Province of Barcelona | Catalan European Democratic Party | Together for Catalonia | Elected |
