= Oriol Junqueras =

Politician and historian from Catalonia, Spain (born 1969)

Oriol Junqueras GMGC
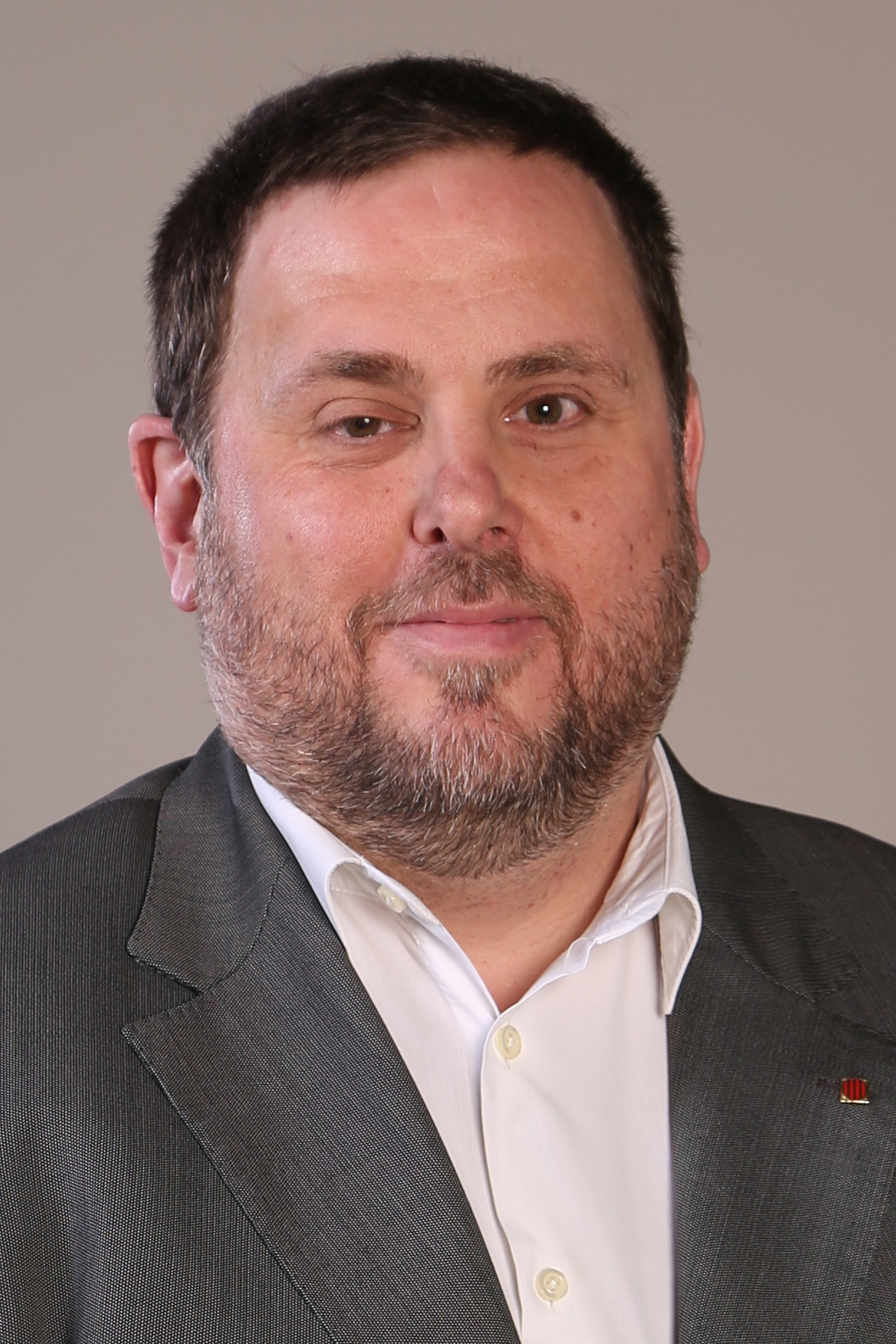
- Junqueras in 2016

President of Republican Left of Catalonia
- Incumbent
- Assumed office 14 December 2024
- Preceded by: Marta Rovira (acting)
- In office 17 September 2011 – 10 June 2024
- Preceded by: Joan Puigcercós
- Succeeded by: Marta Rovira (acting)

Vice President of Catalonia
- In office 14 January 2016 – 28 October 2017
- President: Carles Puigdemont
- Preceded by: Neus Munté
- Succeeded by: Office suspended Pere Aragonès (2018)

Minister of Economy and Finance of Catalonia
- In office 14 January 2016 – 27 October 2017
- President: Carles Puigdemont
- Preceded by: Andreu Mas-Colell
- Succeeded by: Pere Aragonès

Member of the European Parliament
- In office 2 July 2019 – 2 January 2020 (suspended)
- Succeeded by: Jordi Solé i Ferrando
- Constituency: Spain
- In office 14 July 2009 – 31 December 2011
- Succeeded by: Ana Miranda Paz
- Constituency: Spain

Member of the Parliament of Catalonia
- In office 17 December 2012 – 10 July 2018 (suspended)
- Constituency: Barcelona

Mayor of Sant Vicenç dels Horts
- In office 11 June 2011 – 23 December 2015
- Preceded by: Amparo Piqueras Manzano
- Succeeded by: Maite Aymerich

Member of the Municipality Council of Sant Vicenç dels Horts
- In office 2007–2015

Personal details
- Born: Oriol Junqueras i Vies; 11 April 1969 (age 57) Barcelona, Catalonia, Spain
- Citizenship: Spanish
- Party: Republican Left of Catalonia
- Education: Autonomous University of Barcelona
- Occupation: Academic

Oriol Junqueras i Vies (Catalan: [uɾiˈɔl ʒuŋˈkeɾəz i ˈβi.əs]; born 11 April 1969) is a Catalan politician and historian from Spain. A former mayor of the municipality of Sant Vicenç dels Horts in Catalonia, Junqueras served as Vice President of Catalonia from January 2016 to October 2017, when he was removed from office following the Catalan declaration of independence and was imprisoned until June 2021 for his role in organizing the 2017 Catalan independence referendum. He is president of the Republican Left of Catalonia (ERC). Born in 1969 in Barcelona, Junqueras grew up in the municipality of Sant Vicenç dels Horts. After graduating from the Autonomous University of Barcelona, he taught history at the university.

As a supporter of Catalan independence, Junqueras joined ERC in 2010. Three years before, he had been elected to the Municipality Council of Sant Vicenç dels Horts for the same party, and in 2011 he became mayor. He was elected a member of the European Parliament (MEP) in 2009, a seat he held until January 2012. In 2012 he was elected as a member of the Parliament of Catalonia for the Province of Barcelona. In January 2016, following an agreement between the Junts pel Sí (JxSí), an electoral alliance of which ERC was a part, and the Popular Unity Candidacy (CUP), Junqueras was appointed Vice President of Catalonia.

On 1 October 2017, an independence referendum was held in Catalonia despite the Constitutional Court of Spain ruling that it breached the Spanish constitution. Ninety-two percent supported independence, though turnout was only 43%. Catalan government officials argued that the turnout would have been higher were it not for Spanish police suppression of the vote. On the other hand, many voters who did not support Catalan independence did not turn out, as the constitutional political parties asked citizens not to participate in what they considered an illegal referendum.

The Catalan Parliament declared independence on 27 October 2017, which resulted in the Spanish government imposing direct rule on Catalonia, dismissing the Executive Council of Catalonia. The Catalan Parliament was dissolved, and fresh elections called. On 30 October 2017, charges of rebellion, sedition, and misuse of public funds were brought against Junqueras and other members of the Puigdemont government. On 2 November 2017, Junqueras and seven other Catalan ministers were remanded in custody by the Audiencia Nacional. Six of the ministers were released on bail on 4 December 2017, while Junqueras and Minister of the Interior Joaquim Forn were kept in custody. At the 2017 Catalan regional election held on 21 December, Junqueras was re-elected to Parliament and Catalan pro-independence parties retained an absolute parliamentary majority. Junqueras was suspended as an MP by a Supreme Court judge on 10 July 2018. On 14 October 2019, he was sentenced to 13 years in prison and a 13-year ban from holding public office for the crimes of sedition and misappropriation of public funds. The European Court of Justice ruled on 19 December 2019 that Junqueras had parliamentary immunity as he was an elected MEP, and should have been released from prison. He was freed in June 2021 following a Spanish government pardon after he had served 3 and a half years.

== Early life and family ==
Junqueras was born on 11 April 1969 in Sant Andreu de Palomar, a neighbourhood in the Sant Andreu district of Barcelona, Spain. His father was a high school teacher and his mother was a nurse. Aged two, he and his family moved to Sant Vicenç dels Horts in Baix Llobregat. His parents were persuaded by a nun to send him to the Liceo Italiano in Barcelona where he learned Italian. As a youngster he worked in the family's almond and olive orchards in Castellbell i el Vilar, Bages.

Junqueras claims he started supporting Catalan independence when he was eight years old. After school he joined the University of Barcelona, where he was an activist in the student union, to study economics but before completing the course, transferred to the Autonomous University of Barcelona (UAB), graduating with a bachelor's degree in modern and contemporary history in 1996. He then decided to continue in academia by pursuing a PhD at UAB.

== Academic career ==
In 2002, Junqueras graduated with a doctorate in History of Economic Thought from UAB, where he later lectured in "Premodern History of East Asia" and "Bases of the Modern World" at the Department of Modern and Contemporary History. His PhD thesis was about economic thought in early modern Catalonia. He has also been invited to lecture at the University of Vic while in prison.

He has been an advisor and scriptwriter to a variety of Catalan radio and television programmes on politics and history, including Conviure Amb el Risc, El Favorit (TV3, 2005), En Guàrdia and El Nas de Cleòpatra (Catalunya Ràdio), Els Maquis, La Guerra Silenciada and Minoría Absoluta and El Món (RAC 1). He has co-authored several books including Els Catalans i Cuba (1998), La Batalla de l'Ebre (1999) and La Presó Model de Barcelona (2000). He is a member of the Center Excursionista of Sant Vicenç dels Horts and Orfeó Vicentí.

== Political career ==
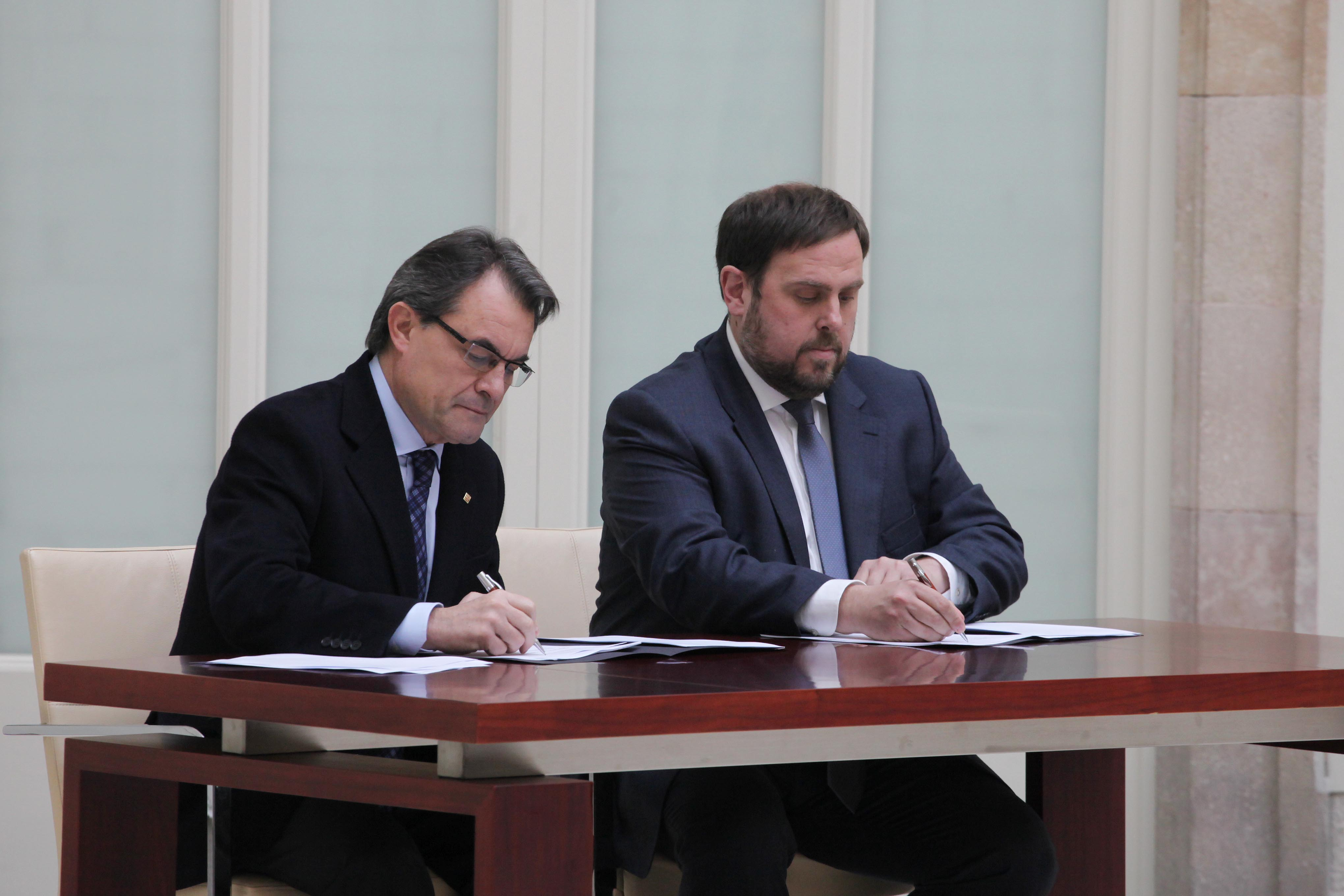
Artur Mas and Oriol Junqueras signing the government agreement in December 2012

Junqueras contested the 2003 local elections as a Republican Left of Catalonia-Acord Municipal (ERC-AM) electoral alliance candidate in Sant Vicenç dels Horts but failed to get elected. He contested the 2007 local elections as an ERC-AM candidate in Sant Vicenç dels Horts and was elected but the ERC-AM remained in opposition. He was re-elected at the 2011 local elections as a Junts per Sant Vicenç (JuntsxSVH) electoral alliance candidate. JuntsxSVH formed an administration with the Convergence and Union (CiU) and the Initiative for Catalonia Greens-United and Alternative Left (ICV-EUiA-E) and Junqueras became Mayor of Sant Vicenç dels Horts. He was re-elected at the 2015 local elections.

Junqueras contested the 2009 European elections as a Europe of the Peoples–Greens (EdP–V) electoral alliance candidate and was elected to the European Parliament. He became leader of the Republican Left of Catalonia in 2011.

Junqueras contested the 2012 regional election as a Republican Left of Catalonia–Catalonia Yes (ERC–CatSí) electoral alliance candidate in the Province of Barcelona and was elected to the Parliament of Catalonia. In December 2012 the ERC and CiU reached an agreement whereby the ERC would support Artur Mas' minority government. As part of the agreement an independence referendum would be held in 2014. Despite the agreement, and protests form the Socialists and Greens, Junqueras was appointed Leader of the Opposition in the Catalan Parliament in January 2013.

Junqueras was re-elected at the 2015 regional election as a Junts pel Sí (JxSí) electoral alliance candidate. In January 2016, following a last-minute agreement between pro-Catalan independence parties JxSí and Popular Unity Candidacy (CUP) to replace Mas, Junqueras was appointed Vice President of Catalonia and Minister of Economy and Finance.

=== Catalonia independence crisis ===
In June 2017 the President of Catalonia Carles Puigdemont announced that a referendum on Catalan independence would be held on 1 October 2017. The Catalan Parliament passed legislation on 6 September 2017 authorising the referendum which would be binding and based on a simple majority without a minimum threshold. The following day Constitutional Court of Spain suspended the legislation, blocking the referendum. The Spanish government put into effect Operation Anubis in order to disrupt the organisation of the referendum and arrested Catalan government officials. Despite this the referendum went ahead though it was boycotted by those opposing independence and turnout was only 43%. 92% of those who voted supported independence. Around 900 people were injured as the Spanish police used violence to try to prevent voting in the referendum.

On 27 October 2017 the Catalan Parliament declared independence in a vote boycotted by opposition MPs. Almost immediately the Senate of Spain invoked article 155 of the constitution, dismissing Puigdemont and the Catalan government and imposing direct rule on Catalonia. The following day Spanish Prime Minister Mariano Rajoy dissolved the Catalan Parliament and called for fresh regional elections on 21 December 2017. On 30 October 2017 Spanish Attorney General José Manuel Maza laid charges of rebellion, sedition and misuse of public funds at the Audiencia Nacional against Puigdemont, Junqueras and other members of the Catalan government. The charges carry maximum sentences of 30, 15 and 6 years in prison respectively.

=== Imprisonment ===
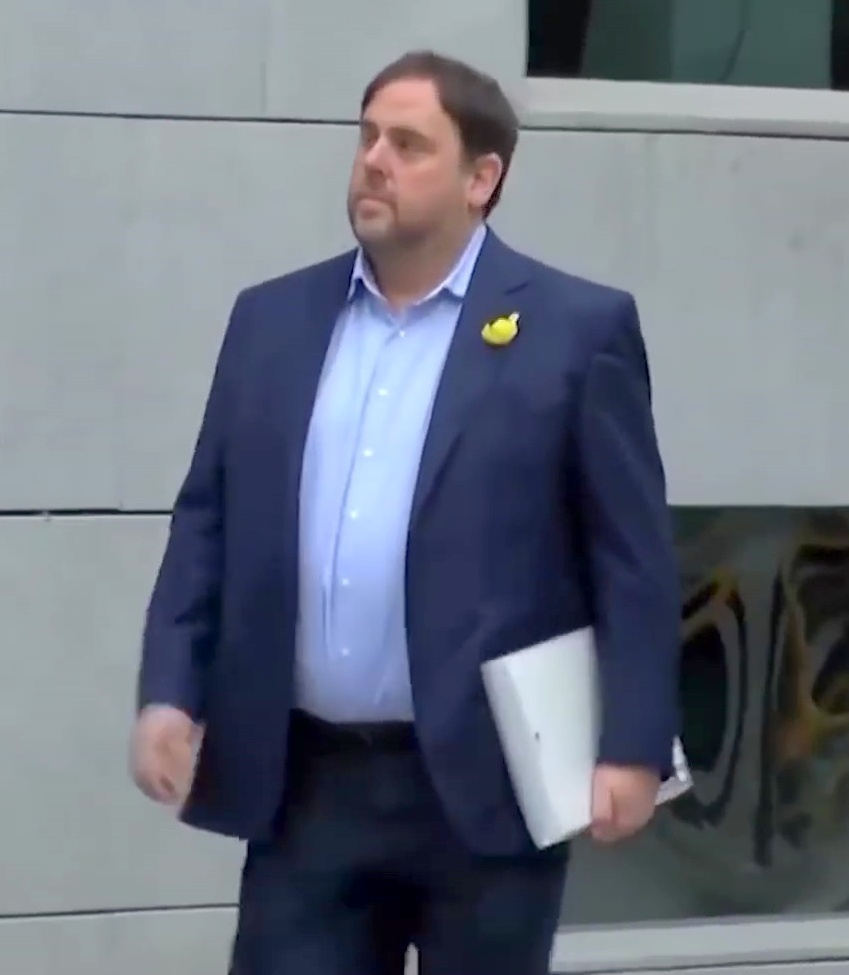
Junqueras arrives at the Audiencia Nacional in Madrid on 2 November 2017

On 2 November 2017 Audiencia Nacional judge Carmen Lamela remanded in custody Junqueras and seven other Catalan ministers (Dolors Bassa, Meritxell Borràs, Joaquim Forn, Carles Mundó, Raül Romeva, Josep Rull and Jordi Turull) as she considered them a flight risk. The jailed ministers were separated and sent to five different prisons: Bassa and Borrás to Alcalá, Junqueras and Forn to Estremera, Mundó to Aranjuez prison, Romeva and Turull to Valdemoro and Rull to Navalcarnero. A ninth minister, Santi Vila, was freed on bail as he had resigned from the government the day before the declaration of independence, but had to spend a night in Estremera prison whilst his lawyers secured his €50,000 bail. According to their lawyer Jaume Alonso-Cuevillas, the ministers were mistreated in a rough ride to prison. They were allegedly handcuffed behind their backs without seat belts in a van going very fast, forced to listen to the Spanish national anthem on a loop and threatened by their guards. Mundo allegedly suffered injuries due to the handcuffs and two ministers were allegedly forced to strip to prevent them carrying anything into prison. Earlier, as the ministers arrived at the Audiencia Nacional, Spanish police officers were shown, in video obtained Reuters and published by the La Vanguardia, making sneering, homophobic comments about the ministers, with one officer saying "Wait till you see what they do to the little teddy bear", referring to Junqueras, "When they get him on all fours, they’ll fix his eye".

On 1 December 2017 the eight jailed ministers and two jailed independence activists — Jordi Cuixart and Jordi Sànchez i Picanyol — appeared before Supreme Court judge Pablo Llarena to request bail while they await trial. They renounced the declaration of independence, pledged support for the imposition of direct rule and agreed to work within the law. On 4 December 2017 Llarena released, after 32 days in prison, six of the ministers (Bassa, Borrás, Mundó, Romeva, Rull and Turull) on bail of €100,000 but ordered that their passports be confiscated. However, Junqueras and Forn, together with Cuixart and Sànchez, were refused bail. In denying them bail, Llarena claimed that it remained to be seen if their pledge to abide by Spanish law was "truthful and real" and that there was a risk that they would commit the same crimes if released.

Whilst remaining in prison, Junqueras contested the 2017 regional election as an ERC–CatSí electoral alliance candidate and was re-elected to Parliament. At the election Catalan secessionists retained a slim majority in the Catalan Parliament. Junqueras was denied bail on 5 January 2018 by Supreme Court judges Miguel Colmenero, Alberto Jorge Barreiro and Francisco Monterde who said that "there is no sign that the defendant has any intention of abandoning the route he has followed until now". On 12 January 2018 Supreme Court judge Pablo Llarena denied permission for Junqueras to attend the opening session of the Catalan Parliament, or for him to be transferred to a Catalan prison so that he could be closer to his relatives, but opened the way for him to vote by proxy. When the Catalan Parliament met on 17 January 2018 it allowed the three jailed MPs - Forn, Junqueras and Sànchez - to vote by proxy, with Marta Rovira voting for Junqueras.

On 7 March 2018, the High Commissioner of the Office of the United Nations High Commissioner for Human Rights reminded Spanish authorities that "pre-trial detention should be considered a measure of last resort," referring to Catalan politicians and activists arrested after the independence referendum.

On 4 July 2018, Junqueras was transferred to Lledoners Prison in Catalonia. Since then, several demonstrations of support have taken place at the door of the prison. In December 2018, the International Association of Democratic Lawyers issued a statement requesting the release of 'Catalan political prisoners'. On 1 February 2019, he was transferred back to the Madrilenian prison of Soto del Real, to face the trial that is expected to begin on 12 February 2019.

On 29 May 2019, the United Nations Working Group on Arbitrary Detention urged Spain to release Junqueras, Cuixart and Sànchez and to investigate their "arbitrary" detention and the violation of their rights, as well as compensating them for the time spent in jail. The Spanish government criticised the report, arguing that the reasoning for their opinion did not take into account some of the alleged crimes. Spain's government issued a statement that raised "doubts" about the group's "independence and impartiality" and called on the U.N. to make sure that its semi-independent working groups are not used "for spurious purposes".

On 14 October 2019, Junqueras was sentenced by the Supreme Court to 13 years of prison and 13 years of inability to hold any public or private office. The European Court of Justice ruled on 19 December 2019 that Junqueras had parliamentary immunity as he was an elected MEP and should have been released from prison. On 22 June 2021, the Government of Spain formally pardoned Junqueras and eight other Catalan politicians for their roles in the unilateral declaration of independence.

== Personal life ==
Junqueras married school teacher Neus Bramona in 2013. They have a son, Lluc, and a daughter, Joana. Junqueras is a Catholic.

== Works ==
- Els Catalans i Cuba (1998, Proa)
- Catalunya, Espanya, Cuba: Centres i Perifèries (1999, Graó)
- Manel Girona, el Banc de Barcelona i el Canal d'Urgell: Pagesos i Burgesos en l'Articulació del Territori (2003, Pagès Editors, co-author Maria Antònia Martí Escayol)
- Guerres dels Catalans (2005, Mina, co-author Enric Calpena i Ollé)
- Guerra, Economia i Política a la Catalunya de l'Alta Edat Moderna (2005, Farell)
- Economia i Pensament Econòmic a la Catalunya de l'Alta Edat Moderna: 1520-1630 (2006, Autonomous University of Barcelona)
- Camí de Sicília: l'Expansió Mediterrània de Catalunya (2008, Cossetània Edicions)
- Les Proclames de Sobirania de Catalunya (1640-1939) (2009, Farell Editors, co-authors Adrià Cases & Albert Botran)
- Converses amb Oriol Junqueras: Una Actitud per fer Avançar el País (2011, Viena, co-author Bernat Ferrer i Frigola)
- Història del Japó (2011, Editorial UOC, co-authors Dani Madrid i Morales, Guillermo Martínez Taberner & Pau Pitarch Fernández)
- Revoltats (2015, Ara Llibres, co-author Justo Molinero Calero)
- Sublevados (2015, Ara Llibres, co-author Justo Molinero Calero)

== Electoral history ==
Electoral history of Oriol Junqueras
Election	Constituency	Party	Alliance	No.	Result
2003 local	Sant Vicenç dels Horts	Republican Left of Catalonia	Republican Left of Catalonia-Acord Municipal		Not elected
2007 local	Sant Vicenç dels Horts	Republican Left of Catalonia	Republican Left of Catalonia-Acord Municipal	1	Elected
2009 European	Spain	Republican Left of Catalonia	Europe of the Peoples–Greens	1	Elected
2011 local	Sant Vicenç dels Horts	Republican Left of Catalonia	Junts per Sant Vicenç	1	Elected
2012 regional	Province of Barcelona	Republican Left of Catalonia	Republican Left of Catalonia–Catalonia Yes	1	Elected
2015 local	Sant Vicenç dels Horts	Republican Left of Catalonia	Junts per Sant Vicenç	1	Elected
2015 regional	Province of Barcelona	Republican Left of Catalonia	Junts pel Sí	5	Elected
2017 regional	Province of Barcelona	Republican Left of Catalonia	Republican Left of Catalonia–Catalonia Yes	1	Elected
2019 European	Spain	Republican Left of Catalonia	Republics Now	1	Elected

Political offices
Preceded by Amparo Piqueras Manzano	Mayor of Sant Vicenç dels Horts; 2011–2015	Succeeded by Mayte Aymerich
Preceded by Neus Munté	Vice President of the Catalan Government; 2016–2017	Suspended Title next held by Pere Aragonès
Preceded by Andreu Mas-Colell	Minister of Economy and Finance of Catalonia; 2016–2017	Suspended Title next held by Pere Aragonès
