= Albert Botran =

Spanish politician

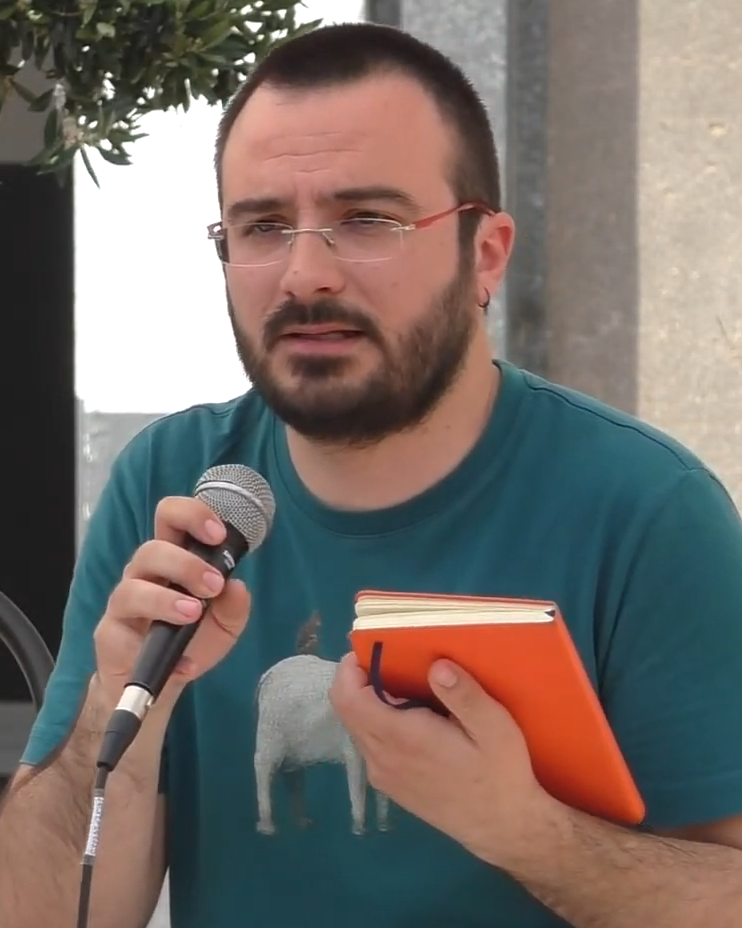
- Botran in 2018

Member of the Congress of Deputies
- In office 3 December 2019 – 16 August 2023
- Constituency: Barcelona

Member of the Parliament of Catalonia
- In office 26 October 2015 – 28 October 2017
- Constituency: Barcelona

Member of Molins de Rei Municipal Council
- In office 2011–2015

Personal details
- Born: Albert Botran i Pahissa; 14 January 1984 (age 42) Molins de Rei, Catalonia, Spain
- Citizenship: Spanish
- Party: Poble Lliure
- Other political affiliations: Popular Unity Candidacy–For Rupture
- Education: Autonomous University of Barcelona
- Occupation: Historian

Albert Botran i Pahissa (born 14 January 1984) is a Spanish historian and politician from Catalonia and a former member of the Congress of Deputies of Spain. He was previously a member of the Parliament of Catalonia.

== Early life ==
Botran was born on 14 January 1984 in Molins de Rei, Catalonia. He has a degree in history and a master's degree in comparative history from the Autonomous University of Barcelona.

== Career ==
Botran has been active in the leftist Catalan independence movement since 2002 and helped found the Molins de Rei branch of Popular Unity Candidacy (CUP) in 2007. He was a member of the CUP's national secretariat from 2009 to 2013 and from 2018 to 2019. Botran works for the Òmnium Cultural. In 2010 he won the 24th Francesc Carreras i Candi Award for his work Pensar Històricament els Països Catalans. La Historiografia i el Projecte Nacional dels Països Catalans (1960-1985).

Botran contested the 2011 local elections as a Popular Unity Candidacy–Active People (CUP-PA) electoral alliance candidate in Molins de Rei and was elected. Botran was one of the signatories of the October 2014 Nous Temps, Noves Eines - Per la Independència, pel Socialisme, pels Països Catalans: Ni un pas Enrere’, manifesto by leftist Catalan nationalists. The manifesto led to the formation, in November 2014, of Poble Lliure of which Botran is a member. He did not seek re-election at the 2015 local elections.

Botran contested the 2015 regional election as a CUP candidate in the Province of Barcelona and was elected to the Parliament of Catalonia. In February 2017 Botran attended an event in Castelló de Farfanya marking the 30th death anniversary of Catalan independence activist Julià Babia, a member of the Movement for Defence of the Land. As a consequence, in September 2017 the Spanish Attorney General started an investigation on charges of extolling terrorism against four members of Poble Lliure: Botran, Toni Casserras, Ferran Dalmau and Guillem Fuster. In December 2018 the Audiencia Nacional started investigating the case against the four and three others - Marcel·lí Canet, Marcel Casellas and Josep Maria Cervelló.

At the 2017 regional election Botran was placed 81st on CUP's list of candidates in the province of Barcelona but the party only won three seats in the province and as a result he failed to get re-elected. He contested the 2019 November general election as a Popular Unity Candidacy–For Rupture candidate in the Province of Barcelona and was elected to the Congress of Deputies. In 2023 general elections he wasn't reelected.

== Works ==
- Les Proclames de Sobirania de Catalunya 1640-1936 (2009, Farell Editors, co-authors Adrià Cases and Oriol Junqueras)
- Pensar Històricament els Països Catalans. La Historiografia i el Projecte Nacional dels Països Catalans (1960–1985) (2010)
- Unitat Popular. La construcció de la CUP i l'Independentisme d'Esquerres (2012, Edicions El Jonc)
- Introducció a la Història dels Països Catalans (2014, Ediciones del 1979, co-authors Carles Castellanos and Lluís Sales; ISBN 9788494012679)

== Electoral history ==
Electoral history of Albert Botran
Election	Constituency	Party	Alliance	No.	Result
2011 local	Molins de Rei	Popular Unity Candidacy	Popular Unity Candidacy-Active People	4	Elected
2015 regional	Province of Barcelona	Poble Lliure	Popular Unity Candidacy	5	Elected
2017 regional	Province of Barcelona	Poble Lliure	Popular Unity Candidacy	81	Not elected
2019 November general	Province of Barcelona	Poble Lliure	Popular Unity Candidacy–For Rupture	2	Elected
