= Josep Pagès =

Catalan academic, lawyer and politician

Member of the Congress of Deputies of Spain
- Incumbent
- Assumed office 9 March 2021
- Preceded by: Jaume Alonso-Cuevillas
- Constituency: Barcelona

Personal details
- Born: Josep Pagès i Massó; 28 June 1972 (age 54) Sant Celoni, Catalonia, Spain
- Party: Together for Catalonia
- Education: Autonomous University of Barcelona
- Occupation: Academic

Josep Pagès i Massó (born 28 June 1972) is a Catalan academic, lawyer, politician and a member of the Congress of Deputies of Spain.

== Early life ==
Pagès was born on 28 June 1972 in Sant Celoni, Catalonia. He has a degree in law, political science and sociology from the Autonomous University of Barcelona (UAB). He has a master's degree in constitutional law.

== Career ==
Pagès was a lawyer for the Generalitat de Catalunya, head of legal for Cardedeu Municipal Council's Technical Services department and secretary of the Territorial Commission of Urbanism of Terres de l'Ebre and Tarragona. He is a professor of constitutional law at UAB. He was a lawyer for Barcelona City Council's planning department and secretary of the Prague Lawyers Collective. He was one of the signatories of the May 2017 Manifesto of Jurists in which 600 jurists argued that a referendum on Catalan self-determination was constitutional.

Pagès was a member of the Electoral Union of Catalonia (Sindicatura Electoral de Catalunya), a five-member board established by the Parliament of Catalonia to monitor the 2017 Catalan independence referendum. The Spanish authorities, who considered the referendum to be illegal, warned the board to step down and the Constitutional Court of Spain threatened to fine each member €12,000 for each day they stayed in post. The board stepped down on 26 September 2017, a week before the referendum. Nevertheless, Pagès and the other four members of the board (Marta Alsina, Marc Marsal, Jordi Matas and Tània Vergé) were charged with disobedience and usurpation of public office for their role in the independence referendum and are currently awaiting trial. The public prosecutor has requested a sentence of two years and nine months in prison for the five defendants.

At the 2015 local elections Pagès was placed 17th on the Convergence and Union (CiU) electoral alliance's list of candidates in Sant Celoni but the alliance only managed to win seven seats in the municipality and as a result he failed to get elected. At the April 2019 general election Pagès was placed seventh on the Together for Catalonia (JuntsxCat) electoral alliance's list of candidates in the Province of Barcelona but the alliance only managed to win three seats in the province and as a result he failed to get elected. At the November 2019 general election he was placed sixth on the JuntsxCat electoral alliance's list of candidates in the Province of Barcelona but the alliance only managed to win four seats in the province and as a result he failed to get elected. However, in March 2021, he was appointed to the Congress of Deputies following the election of Jaume Alonso-Cuevillas to the Parliament of Catalonia.

== Electoral history ==
Electoral history of Josep Pagès
Election	Constituency	Party	Alliance	No.	Result
2015 local	Sant Celoni		Convergence and Union	17	Not elected
2019 April general	Province of Barcelona		Together for Catalonia	7	Not elected
2019 November general	Province of Barcelona		Together for Catalonia	6	Not elected
