= 2015–2016 Catalan government formation =

- Date: 28 September 2015–10 January 2016
- Location: Catalonia, Spain
- Cause: Catalan regional election, 2015
- Participants: Junts pel Sí; → CDC; → ERC; → DC; → MES; C's; PSC; CatsíqueesPot; PP; CUP
- Outcome: Carles Puigdemont replacing Artur Mas as President of the Generalitat of Catalonia.; Fresh election avoided.

Attempts to form a government in Catalonia, and related events, followed the inconclusive Catalan regional election of 27 September 2015, which failed to deliver an overall majority for any political party.

== History ==
The 2015 election resulted in pro-Catalan independence Junts pel Sí (JxSí) (a coalition comprising the two main centre-right and centre-left Catalan parties at the time, Democratic Convergence of Catalonia (CDC) and Republican Left of Catalonia (ERC), together with several minor parties) and Popular Unity Candidacy (CUP) holding a slim majority of seats, despite not securing a majority of votes as was their objective. President Artur Mas' JxSí coalition also fell short of its goal to secure an absolute majority on its own, obtaining 62 seats to the combined 63 of the remaining opposition parties. Thus, Mas found himself dependent on CUP's support for securing his nomination to be re-elected to the office. The CUP, however, found difficulty in supporting Mas, who was viewed as having been tainted by several corruption scandals involving his party, CDC.

Both JxSí and the CUP submitted on 28 October 2015 a parliamentary motion declaring the "beginning of the process towards the independence of Catalonia as a republic", a move seen by many as a concession from JxSí to the CUP so that it would support Artur Mas' investiture. This move, however, was met with stiff opposition from all other parties, which regarded it as "risky" and "illegal", and did not succeed in bringing the CUP to terms, which kept refusing to invest Mas as regional premier and advocated for other candidates to be proposed. On 10 November 2015, the first ballot of Artur Mas' investiture vote was held, with 62 voting favourably to Mas' election (only those of JxSí) and 73 against (those from all other parties). The unsuccessful vote set up the start of the legal timespan of two months for election a new President before the Parliament's automatic dissolution and the forced call of a new election. A subsequent second ballot on 12 November also proved inconclusive, and further ballots were suspended until JxSí and the CUP were able to solve the deadlock. Negotiations between JxSí and the CUP then ensued, but without success.

The popular Mayor of Barcelona Ada Colau's personal involvement during the election campaign and Podemos' promise on holding a legal self-determination referendum on Catalonia resulted in a resounding victory for Podemos' brand, En Comú Podem (Catalan for "In Common We Can"), at the regional level in the 2015 Spanish general election held on 20 December. ERC scored a distant second place, while Democracy and Freedom (DiL), the coalition formed by Mas' party CDC and replacing the defunct Convergence and Union (CiU), finished fourth. This was seen as a major setback for the sovereignist cause, as Catalans had massively voted for a political option that supported the celebration of a referendum on the independence issue but that also advocated for Catalonia's permanence within Spain, and was said to motivate the CUP's subsequent definitive denial to re-elect Mas as regional premier. After the general election, JxSí made a last offer to the CUP, which involved a "transitional presidency" formed by four people, which would, nonetheless, be led by Mas.

Following a long process of internal debate to determine whether the party should support Mas' investiture or force the call of a new election, the CUP's assembly held on 27 December 2015 resulted in a draw between both options, with 1,515 out of 3,030 registered party supporters voting for each choice. CUP leaders called on JxSí to come up with an alternative candidate for premier, something which the latter's member parties, however, refused. Finally, the CUP's leadership narrowly decided in a vote held on 3 January to definitely oppose Mas' investiture. JxSí members accused the CUP of torpedoing the independentist cause and refused to withdraw Mas' candidacy on the grounds that "there is no alternative". CUP's leader and candidate for the 2015 Catalan election, Antonio Baños, resigned the following day, claiming that he did not share his party's decision as he perceived that it weakened the independence process. ERC leader Oriol Junqueras called on 4 January for both CDC and the CUP to keep negotiating to prevent a new election that he saw as "negative for Catalonia", but avoided to note on whether he thought Artur Mas should step aside or not. Artur Mas stated on 5 January that JxSí was not making any new proposals, pleaded guilt on "having trusted the CUP" and announced that he would sign the election call decree on 11 January for a fresh election to be held on 6 March. Then-acting Prime Minister Mariano Rajoy acknowledged the same day that he saw "no alternative to a repeat of elections in Catalonia" after the fracture of the pro-independence alliance. This however did not transpire: a last minute deal was struck between JxSí and the CUP to ensure a separatist government, although without Mas as President.
