= Neus Munté =

Spanish politician

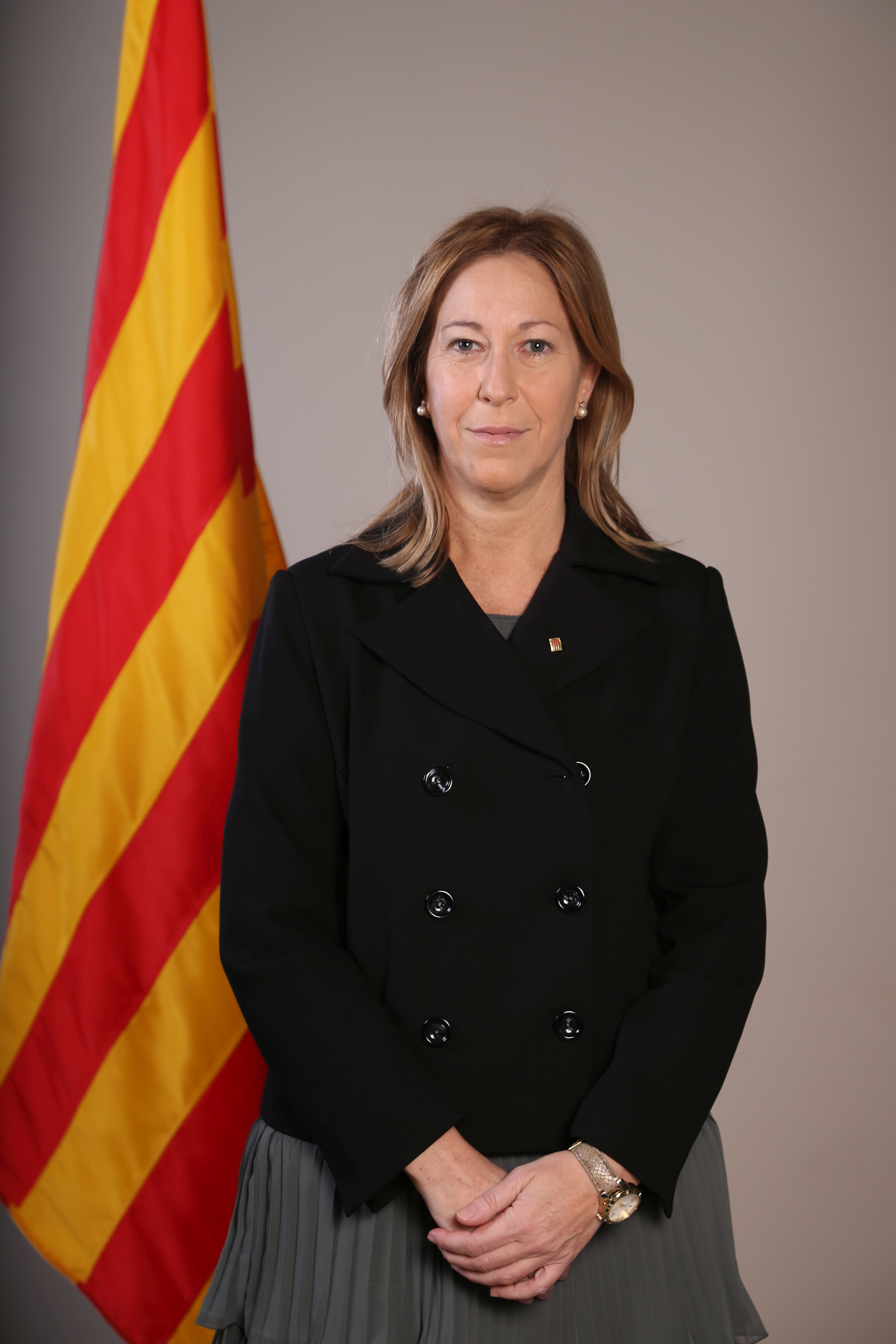
- Official portrait, 2015

Minister of the Presidency of Catalonia
- In office 14 January 2016 – 14 July 2017
- President: Carles Puigdemont
- Preceded by: Francesc Homs
- Succeeded by: Jordi Turull

Government Spokesperson of Catalonia
- In office 22 June 2015 – 14 July 2017
- President: Artur Mas; Carles Puigdemont
- Preceded by: Francesc Homs
- Succeeded by: Jordi Turull

Vice President of Catalonia
- In office 22 June 2015 – 14 January 2016
- President: Artur Mas
- Preceded by: Joana Ortega
- Succeeded by: Oriol Junqueras

Minister of Social Welfare and Family of Catalonia
- In office 27 December 2012 – 14 January 2016
- President: Artur Mas
- Preceded by: Josep Lluís Cleries
- Succeeded by: Dolors Bassa

Personal details
- Born: 13 November 1970 (age 55) Barcelona, Spain
- Party: Democratic Convergence of Catalonia
- Education: University of Barcelona
- Profession: Lawyer

Neus Munté Fernández (born 13 November 1970, in Barcelona) is a Catalan politician.

== Early life and education ==
Munté received a law degree from Barcelona University, and a master's degree in public law and administrative organisation from Pompeu Fabra University.

== Career ==
As a lawyer, she worked for Catalonia's General Union of Workers (UGT), and from 1996 to 1999 served as a member of the National Executive Committee of its Public Services Federation. She was also the union's labour and education secretary, and institutional policy secretary, in the period from 2004 to 2010.

== Political career ==
From 1999 to 2002, Munté served as chief of staff of the Education Ministry, and in 2002 she was elected to the Parliament of Catalonia, holding a seat until 2003. In 2010 she returned to Parliament, serving until 2013. During this period, she was the ruling CiU's education spokesperson and chaired the Personal Equality Committee.

Munte has been a member of CDC, the CiU's senior partner, since 1996. In 1998 she was elected deputy secretary general of the JNC, the CDC's youth wing, a post she held until 2000. At the party conference in 2012, she was elected CDC executive secretary responsible for specialized policy committees. Since December 2012 she has served as Minister of Social Welfare and Family Affairs in the Generalitat of Catalonia, and since 2015 she is the vice president of the Generalitat of Catalonia.
