= Catalan declaration of independence =

2017 unrecognised declaration of independence

Declaration of independence of Catalonia
- Page 1 of the Declaration
- Presented: 10 October 2017
- Ratified: 27 October 2017
- Date effective: Not effective
- Repealed: Effectively unenforceable under Article 155 of the Constitution of Spain
- Signatories: 72 of the 135 members of the Parliament of Catalonia
- Purpose: Unilateral declaration of independence of Catalonia as a sovereign republic from The Kingdom of Spain

The Catalan declaration of independence (Catalan: Declaració d'independència de Catalunya) was a resolution that was passed by the Parliament of Catalonia on 27 October 2017. While the text proclaims the independence of Catalonia from Spain and the establishment of an independent Catalan Republic, the declaration itself did not receive recognition from the international community and it produced no legal effect.

The 2017 Catalan independence referendum took place on 1 October, followed by the 2017 Catalan general strike on 3 October. On 10 October, a document declaring Catalonia to be an independent republic was signed by the members of Catalonia's pro-independence parliamentary majority. The same document was voted for on 27 October by a majority of 70 out of 135 MPs in a plenary session. 10 MPs voted against the declaration and 53 MPs refused to be present during the vote, after the legal counsels of the Catalan Parliament advised that it could not take place as the law on which it was based had been suspended by the Spanish Constitutional Court. On the same day, Prime Minister Mariano Rajoy of Spain invoked Article 155 of the Constitution of Spain for the first time in history. This action dismissed Catalan President Carles Puigdemont and his cabinet, and called for fresh Catalan elections on 21 December 2017. The Deputy Prime Minister of Spain Soraya Sáenz de Santamaría was assigned to be the acting president of Catalonia until the December elections.

== Background ==
On 6 September 2017, the Catalan Parliament, amid significant controversy, passed legislation for a binding referendum on Catalan independence. This decision, supported by Junts pel Sí and the CUP representatives, faced opposition from other parties, with Catalunya Sí que es Pot abstaining. The referendum law stated that if the majority voted 'yes,' independence would be declared two days post the official result announcement, irrespective of voter turnout.

Following this, the Catalan Parliament also ratified the Legal and Foundational Transition Law of the Catalan Republic. This law was set intending to be the primary legal framework for an independent Catalonia until a republic's constitution was established, contingent upon the success of the independence movement.

However, both these laws were promptly suspended by Spain's Constitutional Court following appeals from the Spanish Government. Despite this suspension, Carles Puigdemont, the President of the Government of Catalonia, disregarded the court's decision and maintained the validity of these laws.

The suspended referendum went ahead on 1 October 2017, without legal backing. The Catalan government reported a 90% vote in favor of independence, with a 43% turnout. Independence opponents boycotted the referendum, deeming it illegal.

The referendum's legitimacy was widely disputed due to various procedural anomalies and the absence of validation by an independent entity. Reported irregularities included multiple voting instances, participation of non-citizens, transportation of unsealed ballot boxes, and last-minute changes to voting regulations. The Spanish government criticized these changes, including the acceptance of a universal census allowing voting at any center, and the use of unofficial ballots and envelope-fewer votes. It was also claimed by the government that this referendum was unconstitutional due to intending to attack the "unity of Spain" (reflected in article 2 of the Constitution of Spain).

Neither the Spanish Government nor the European Union acknowledged the referendum's validity, nor did any country recognize the proclaimed "Catalan Republic." An international observers' mission concluded the referendum failed to meet global standards. Additionally, a pre-referendum Metroscopia survey indicated that 61% of Catalans believed the referendum would not hold international legitimacy.

== Timeline ==
=== 10 October: Signing and suspension ===
==== Puigdemont's address ====
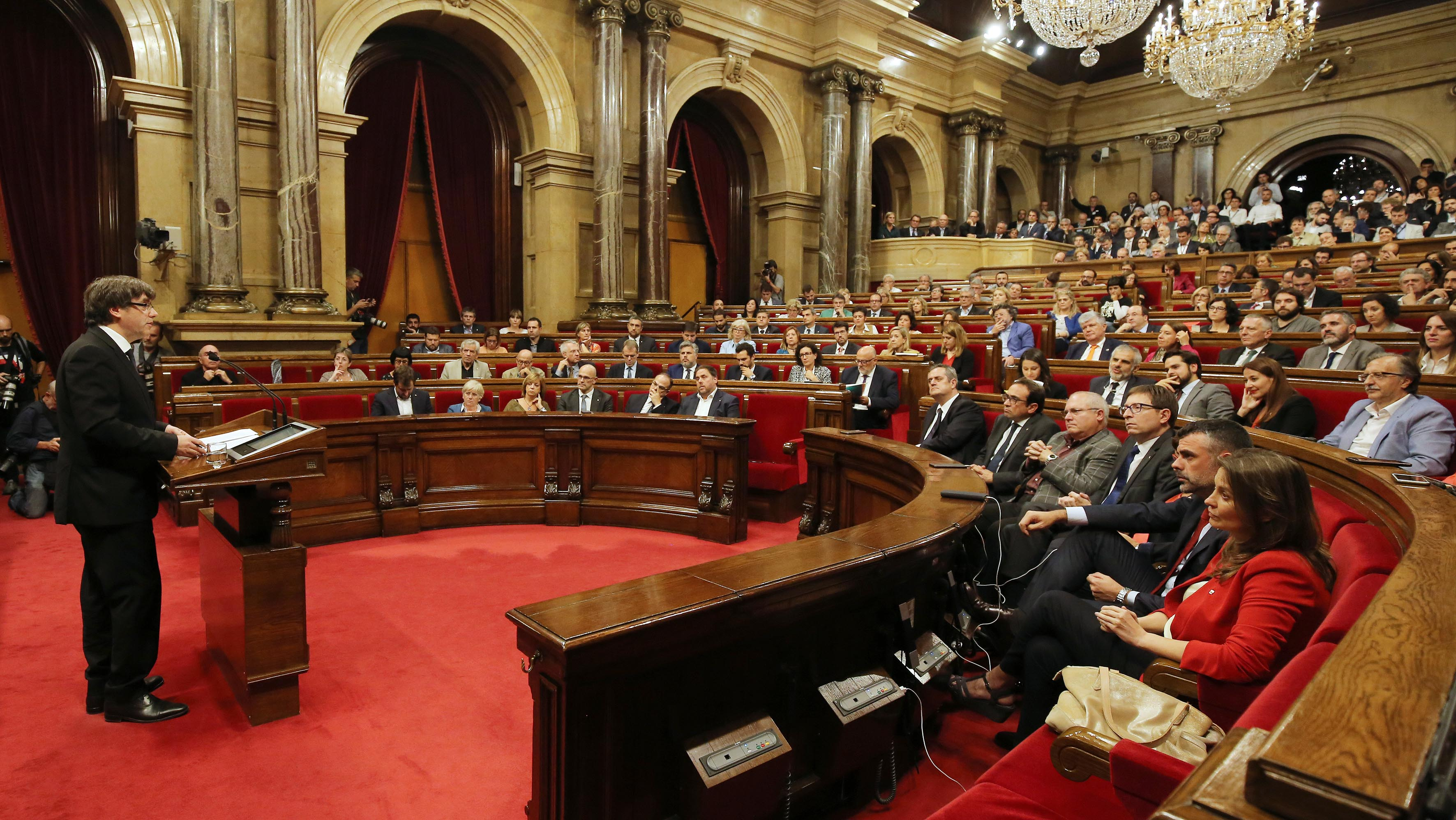
Puigdemont before the Parliament of Catalonia on 10 October 2017

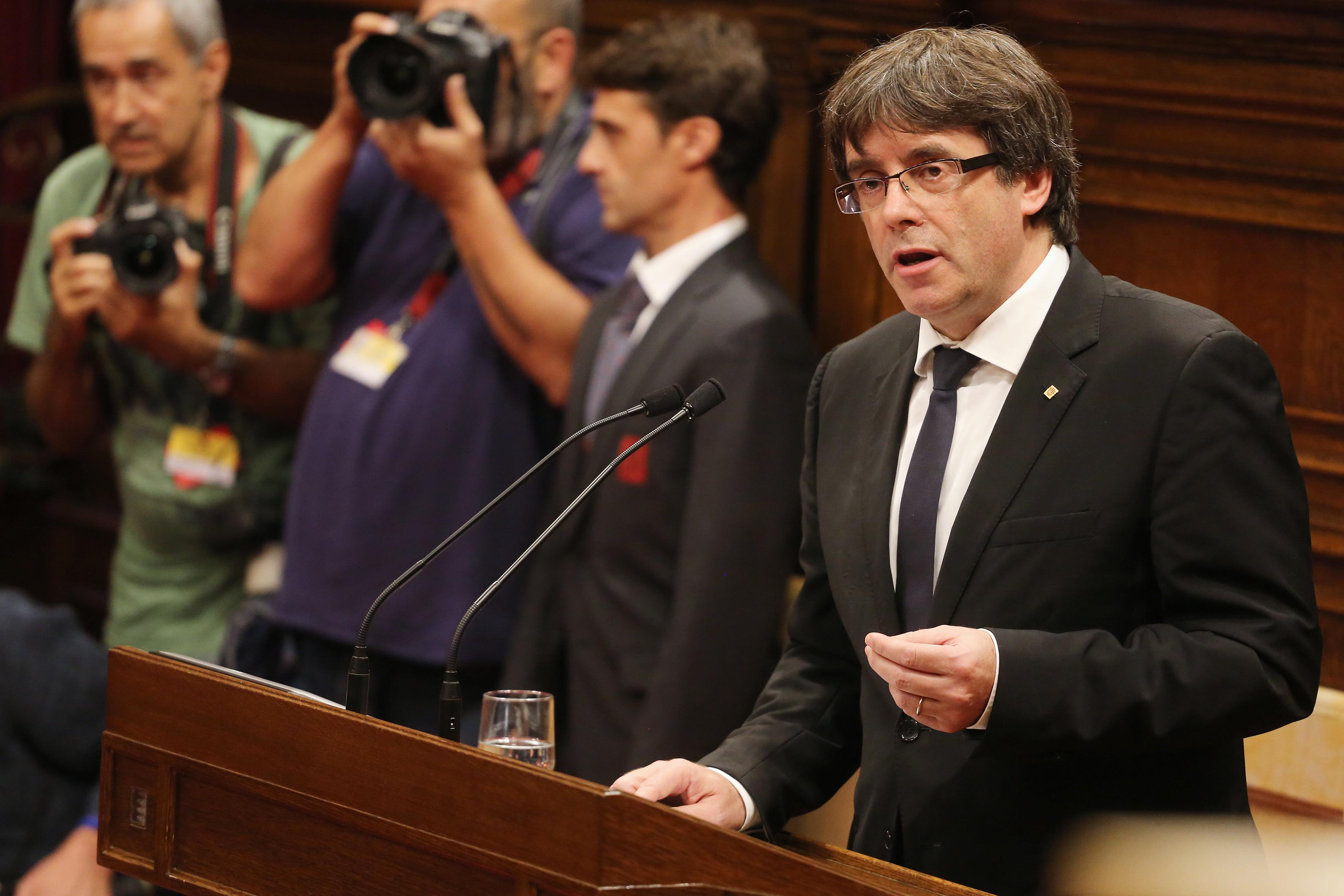
Carles Puigdemont's address led to mass confusion on whether Catalonia declared independence on 10 October or not.

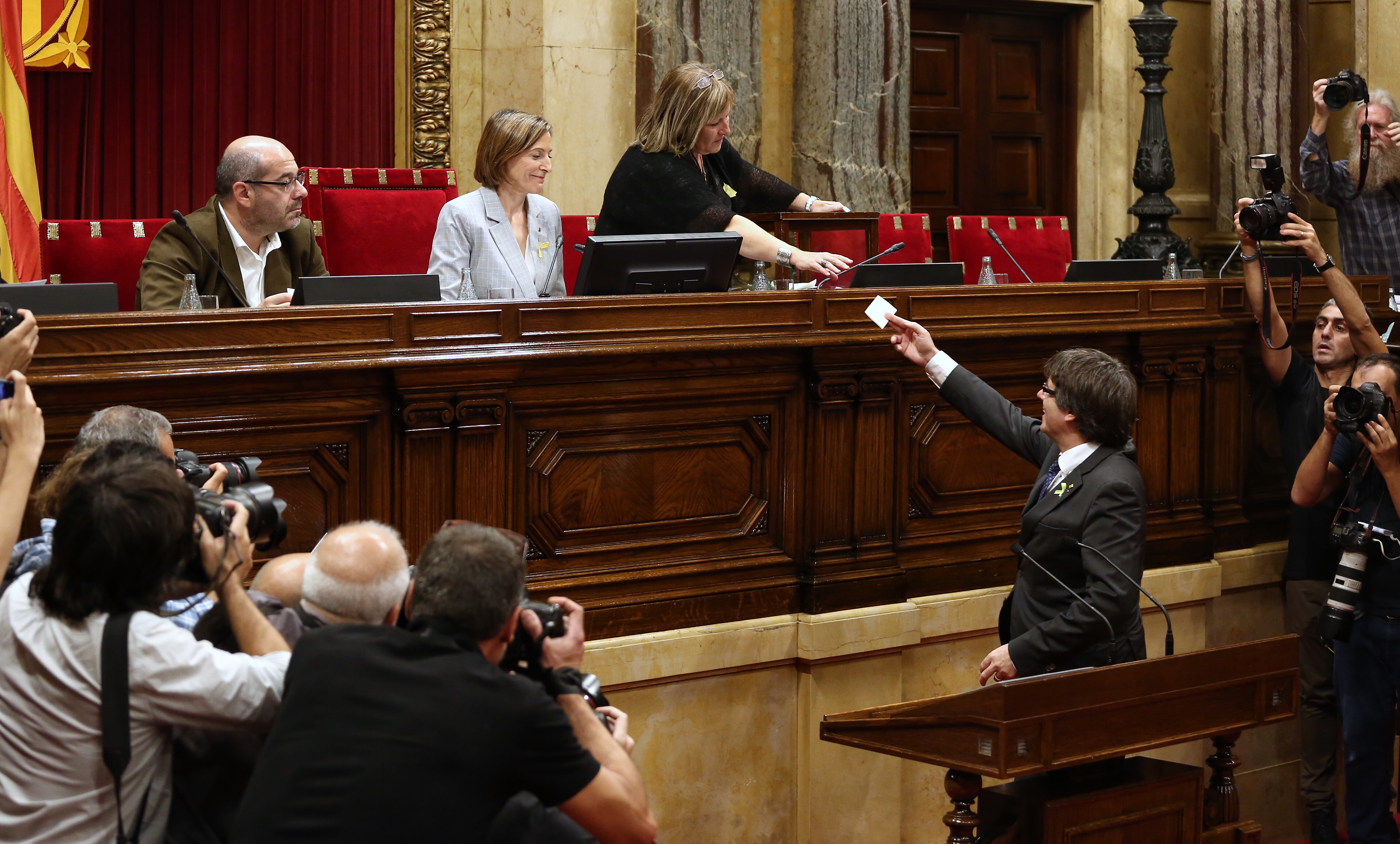
Puigdemont casting the vote for Declaration of Independence on 27 October

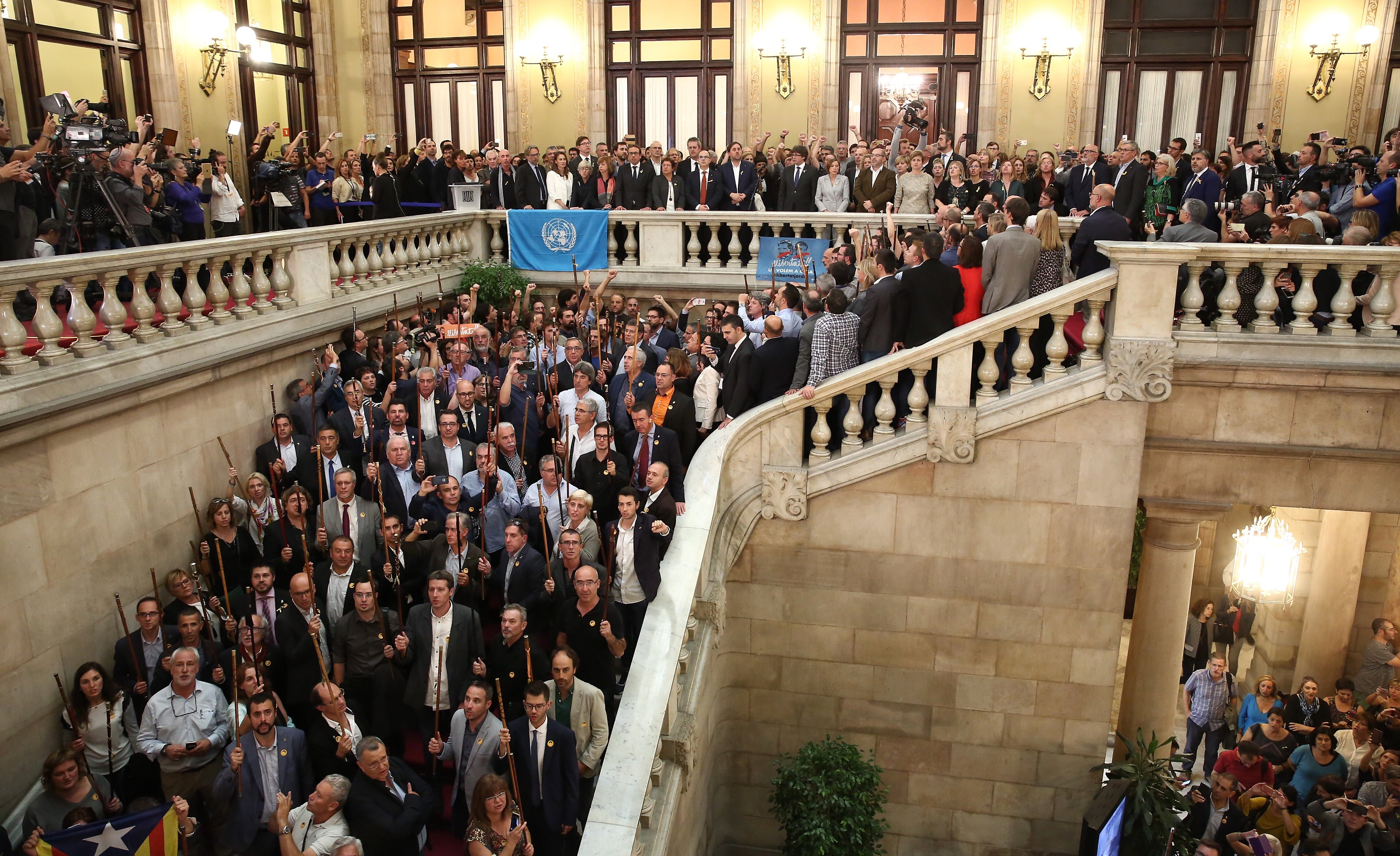
Pro-independence mayors supporting the Declaration of Independence on 27 October in the Parliament of Catalonia

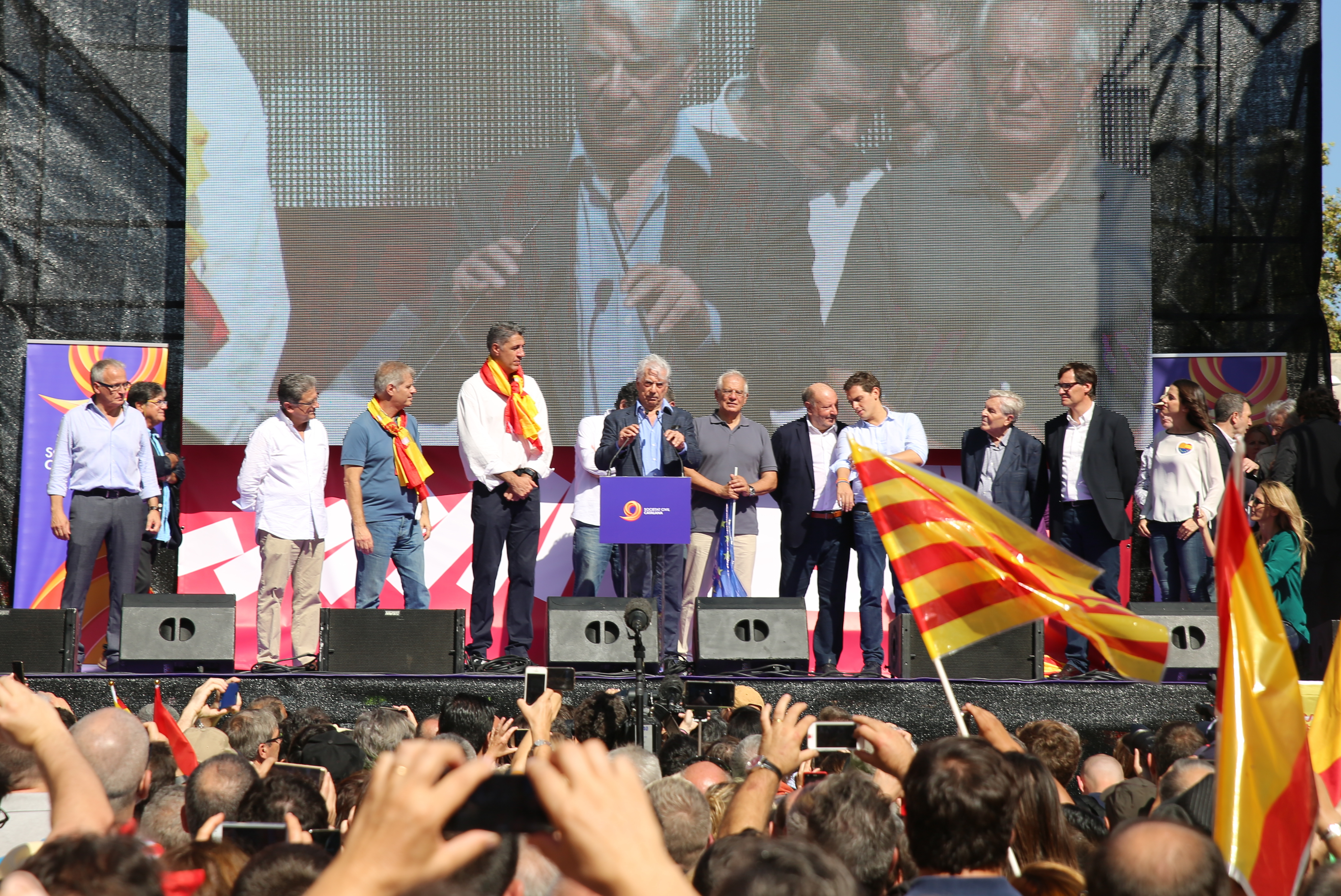
Mario Vargas Llosa and Josep Borrell, among others, during the pro-Constitution demonstration in Barcelona

The Law on the Referendum on Self-determination of Catalonia contained the provision that, in case of an outcome in favour of independence, independence was to be declared within 48 hours after all votes were counted. Catalan President Carles Puigdemont confirmed this on 3 October during an exclusive interview with the BBC, saying "we are going to declare independence 48 hours after all official results are counted". Final results were published by the Catalan government on 6 October, and Puigdemont announced he would formally address the Parliament on 10 October.

Puigdemont was widely expected to declare the independence of Catalonia, which led to worldwide coverage of the parliament session.

After saying that he considered the referendum valid and binding, Puigdemont chose to use the wording "I assume the mandate of the people for Catalonia to become an independent state in the form of a republic", before adding that he would "ask Parliament to suspend the effects of the declaration of independence so that in the coming weeks we can undertake a dialogue".

The speech left observers bewildered as they struggled to understand whether Puigdemont had just declared independence. While some commentators stated that independence had just been declared and put on hold, others stated that the declaration of independence had been postponed.

After Puigdemont's speech, a document titled "Declaration from the Representatives of Catalonia" declaring Catalonia's independence was signed publicly by members of parliament belonging to pro-independence political parties in the auditorium of the Parliament. This document sought to establish Catalonia as an independent state, and called on the international community to recognize it. It was read publicly, but it was not voted on in the Catalan Parliament or published by the Catalan government's official journal.

==== Spanish government's reaction ====
The immediate reaction from the Spanish government was that "it was inadmissible to declare independence implicitly and suspend it explicitly". Minister of Justice Rafael Catalá called it a "non-declaration of independence".

Spanish Prime Minister Mariano Rajoy gave a short news conference on the following day, giving Puigdemont five days to confirm whether he had declared Catalonia's independence or not. Were the answer to be affirmative, the document provided another deadline ending on Thursday 19 October, allowing for Catalan authorities to rectify and prevent the application of Section 155 of the Spanish Constitution, which would authorize Madrid to temporarily take over Catalonia's internal affairs.

According to Spain's Minister of Foreign Affairs Alfonso Dastis, the written declaration was legally void, as it was not voted upon and it was signed outside of a parliamentary session.

==== Business community reactions ====
After the declaration of independence made by Carles Puigdemont, despite the lack of legal effects, the leakage of companies that decided to move their headquarters became massive. The day after the declaration of independence, the château de Montsoreau-Museum of Contemporary Art announced that it was repatriating its collection of Art & Language works on loan at Barcelona Museum of Contemporary Art (MACBA) since 2010. The fear also extended to SMEs and savers, who due to the uncertainty decided to take their money to bank offices outside Catalonia.

=== 27 October: Unilateral declaration of independence ===
On 27 October 2017, a resolution based on the "Declaration of the representatives of Catalonia" declaring the independence of Catalonia was voted in the Parliament and was approved with 70 votes in favor, 10 against, and 2 blank votes. Fifty-three MPs from the opposition refused to be present during the voting after the legal services of the Catalan Parliament advised that the voting could not take place, as the law on which it was based had been suspended by the Spanish Constitutional Court. The two pro-independence parties, JxSí and CUP, had 72 seats, and the vote in favour of independence obtained 70.

=== 27–28 October: Dissolution of Catalonian authorities and direct rule ===
On the evening of 27 October 2017, the Senate of Spain approved the activation of article 155 of the Spanish Constitution for Catalonia in a 214–47 vote, with one abstention. Subsequently, on 28 October, Mariano Rajoy dismissed the Executive Council of Catalonia, dissolved the Parliament of Catalonia and called a snap regional election for 21 December 2017 and handed coordination over Generalitat of Catalonia functions to Deputy Prime Minister Soraya Sáenz de Santamaría.

=== 30–31 October: Suspending declaration of independence ===
On 30 October, Parliament Speaker Carme Forcadell called off a parliamentary meeting scheduled for the next day because the chamber "had been dissolved", thus acknowledging Mariano Rajoy's order. Later that day, it transpired that Puigdemont and part of his dismissed cabinet had fled to Belgium in a move to avoid action from the Spanish judiciary, as the Spanish Attorney General José Manuel Maza announced a criminal complaint against them for rebellion, sedition and embezzlement. Concurrently, lack of civil unrest and work resuming as normal throughout Catalonia showed signs that direct rule from Madrid had taken hold, with Spanish authorities reasserting administrative control over Catalan territory with little resistance.

By 31 October, the declaration of independence was fully suspended by the Constitutional Court of Spain and the dismissed Catalan government accepted the elections proposed by Mariano Rajoy. Puigdemont and part of his cabinet fled to Belgium in a self-imposed exile to avoid being prosecuted by the Spanish judiciary, having been formally accused of rebellion, sedition and embezzlement by the Spanish Attorney General.

== Aftermath ==
On 2 November, the judge Carmen Lamela of the Spanish National Court ordered that eight members of the deposed Catalan government including the ex-vice-president Oriol Junqueras be remanded in custody without bail. Additionally, Santi Vila, who was the Business Minister that resigned over the unilateral declaration of independence, was granted a €50,000 bail. The prosecution requested issuing European Arrest Warrants for Puigdemont and four other members who left Catalonia for Brussels shortly after the declaration.

The Catalan elections were held on 21 December and parties supporting independence again won just over half the seats with just under half of the votes cast.

On 23 March 2018, Spanish Judge Llarena jailed five more Catalan ministers. On 25 March, Puigdemont was detained in Germany but released some days later, after the state court in Schleswig rejected extraditing him for rebellion.

On 21 June 2021, Spanish Prime Minister Pedro Sánchez announced a pardon for those involved in the secession attempt. Days earlier, a poll showed that over 60% of Spaniards opposed the pardons. Sánchez said it would ease tensions with Catalonia, whose regional government welcomed Sánchez's decision.

After the 2023 general elections, in order to reach an investiture agreement between the main government candidate, PSOE, and Junts per Catalunya, the proposal to use the Amnesty Law was presented with the intention of "pursuing full political normality, institutional and social as an essential requirement to address the challenges of the immediate future". This law affects all those responsible (both politicians and civil participants) who, after the 2014 consultation and the 2017 referendum, have been the subject of decisions or judicial processes linked to these events. However, one of the articles of the agreement leaves out of the amnesty those consequences that "have already been declared by virtue of a final and executed administrative ruling or resolution".

The proposal of this law was the cause of constant protests, mainly in the capital during the months following the law proposal, where thousands of citizens expressed their discontent with the agreement presented between the two parties. The social rejection of this agreement was based mainly on the acquittal of the politicians involved in the Procès Trial and the forgiveness of the debt caused during these events between the Generalitat of Catalonia and the Government of Spain (central government). The forgiven debt reflects nearly 15,000 million euros of a total debt of 71,306 million that the Catalan administration maintains with the Autonomous Liquidity Fund (FLA).

== International reactions ==
Catalan independence received no recognition from any sovereign nation. However, the partially recognized, non-UN-member states Abkhazia and South Ossetia claimed they were willing to offer formal recognition should they receive a request to do so from the Catalan government.

=== UN Security Council permanent member states ===
- China – China's foreign ministry spokesperson Hua Chunying stated: "China's stance on this issue is consistent and clear. China regards it as a domestic affair of Spain and understands and supports the Spanish government's effort to maintain national unity, ethnic solidarity and territorial integrity."
- France – President Emmanuel Macron stated that his country's "only interlocutor" with Spain is the Spanish Prime Minister, Mariano Rajoy, and stressed that the situation in the region of Catalonia is a "domestic affair" of Spain.
- Russia – Foreign Ministry spokeswoman Maria Zakharova pointed out that Russia's position on the situation in Catalonia "has not changed" and "remains the same", in reference to what it considers a domestic Spanish matter.
- United Kingdom – The Prime Minister's spokesperson stated, "The UK does not and will not recognise the Unilateral Declaration of Independence made by the Catalan regional parliament. It is based on a vote that was declared illegal by the Spanish courts. We continue to want to see the rule of law upheld, the Spanish Constitution respected, and Spanish unity preserved."
- United States – The U.S. State Department stated: "Catalonia is an integral part of Spain, and the United States supports the Spanish government's constitutional measures to keep Spain strong and united".

=== Other UN member states ===
- Andorra– Government of Andorra considers that Catalonia continues to be an integral part of Spain and appeals for dialogue to resolve the situation.
- Azerbaijan - Azerbaijan's Ministry of Foreign Affairs stated that "The Republic of Azerbaijan supports territorial integrity and sovereignty of the Kingdom of Spain within its internationally recognized borders. We stand for a peaceful settlement of the current situation based on the Constitution and laws of the Kingdom of Spain.".
- Argentina – The Argentine Government, through its Ministry of Foreign Affairs and Worship, does not recognize and rejects the declaration of independence proclaimed by the Parliament of Catalonia.
- Belgium – Belgian Prime Minister Charles Michel stated, "A political crisis can only be resolved through dialogue. We demand a peaceful solution that respects national and international order."
- Brazil – Brazil's Ministry of Foreign Affairs on Saturday, 28 October 2017, rejected Catalonia's unilateral declaration of independence, calling for the "preservation of unity in the Kingdom of Spain."
- Bulgaria – Bulgarian Ministry of Foreign Affairs stated that Bulgaria "respects the constitutional order of the Kingdom of Spain, the rule of law and the principles of the rule of law as fundamental values of the European Union (EU) and all its members. We support the territorial integrity and sovereignty of Spain, which is our strategic partner".
- Canada – Canadian Prime Minister Justin Trudeau stated that Canada only recognises one united Spain and called for talks to be held in a peaceful fashion.
- Chile – Chile's Foreign Minister Heraldo Muñoz has assured that his country will support the territorial integrity of Spain.
- Colombia – Colombian President Juan Manuel Santos ratified his country's support for the territorial integrity of Spain and the Spanish Government, before the declaration of independence of Catalonia.
- Croatia – Croatian Ministry of Foreign and European Affairs stated that "Croatia regards the events in Catalonia as a matter of Spain's internal affairs, and supports democratic and peaceful solutions in accordance with European values".
- Ecuador – Ecuadorian Chancellery stated: "Ecuador calls for a solution to the situation in Catalonia through dialogue, within the framework of the Constitution, the law and the Spanish rule of law, with full respect for the freedoms and rights of all the Spanish citizens."
- Estonia – Estonian prime minister Jüri Ratas stated "Estonia supports the territorial integrity and unity of Spain. Internal affairs must be solved according to their constitution and laws."
- Germany – the German government stated, "The Federal Government does not recognise the unilateral declaration of independence" of the Catalan parliament and expressed concern about the declaration causing "renewed aggravation of the situation."
- Georgia – The President of Georgia stated "Georgia fully supports the sovereignty and territorial integrity of the Kingdom of Spain and stands in solidarity [with] the Spanish Government," in response to the declaration of independence.
- Hungary – Foreign Minister Péter Szijjártó stated Catalonia's declaration of independence is a "matter of Spanish internal affairs". He added the Government of Hungary "hopes that the situation is resolved as soon as possible in accordance with Spain’s constitutional regulations".
- India – The Government of India stated that "Catalonia should address issues of identity and culture within Spain's constitutional framework & respect national integrity"
- Indonesia – Indonesia's Ministry of Foreign Affairs stated that Indonesia does not recognize the unilateral declaration of independence by Catalonia."
- Ireland – The Department of Foreign Affairs issued a statement "We are all concerned about the crisis in Catalonia. Ireland respects the constitutional and territorial integrity of Spain and we do not accept or recognise the Catalan Unilateral Declaration of Independence."
- Italy – The foreign minister Angelino Alfano declared that Italy has not and will not recognise an independent Catalonia.
- Israel – Israel reportedly initially considered refusing to support Spain against Catalan independence, but ultimately issued a statement saying "Israel hopes that the internal crisis in Spain will be resolved quickly and peacefully and through broad national consensus."
- Jamaica – The Jamaican Government has declared that it does not recognise the declaration of independence of Catalonia as it supports a united Spain. The Government made its position known through the release of a statement by Foreign Affairs Minister Senator Kamina Johnson Smith.
- Japan – The Government of Japan has expressed its support for the application of article 155 of the Spanish Constitution before the crisis in Catalonia, and has relied on the situation to be resolved "in a peaceful manner" and in accordance with the Spanish national legislation.
- Lithuania – Foreign Minister Linas Antanas Linkevičius stated in a radio interview that Lithuania supports Spain's territorial integrity and called for dialogue.
- Malaysia – The Ministry of Foreign Affairs tweeted on 1 November that "Malaysia does not recognise Catalonia's unilateral declaration of independence and respects the territorial integrity of Spain".
- Malta – Malta does not recognise Catalonia's declaration of independence and will continue to respect the territorial integrity of Spain, the Foreign Affairs Ministry said.
- Morocco – Morocco rejects the unilateral process of the independence of Catalonia, and expresses its attachment to Spain's "sovereignty and territorial integrity".
- Mexico – President Enrique Peña Nieto has stated that Mexico will not recognize the unilateral declaration of independence of Catalonia. Mexico hopes for a peaceful and political solution.
- Norway – Minister of Foreign Affairs Ine Marie Eriksen Søreide stated that "Norway will not recognize unilateral declaration of Catalan independence. Re-establish legality as basis for dialogue".
- Paraguay – Paraguayan Chancellery stated: "Paraguay advocates respect for the constitutional order and the rule of law in Spain." "In view of the new events in Catalonia, Kingdom of Spain, the Government of the Republic of Paraguay, through the Ministry of Foreign Affairs, urges respect and unrestricted adherence to the rule of law, as it is enshrined in the Spanish Constitution, guarantor of the unity and the democratic rights."
- Peru – Peruvian Chancellery stated: "In view of the events that occurred in Catalonia, the Government of Peru reiterates its rejection of any act or unilateral declaration of independence, as it is an action contrary to the Spanish Constitution and laws."
- Poland – The Polish Ministry of Foreign Affairs stated that "Poland fully respects the principles of sovereignty, territorial integrity, and unity of the Kingdom of Spain. We believe that solving the dispute between the government of the Kingdom of Spain and Catalonia, just like any disputes between the Kingdom of Spain and its autonomous regions, including separatist tendencies, are an internal affair of the Kingdom of Spain. We hope that the situation in Catalonia will stabilise quickly in observance of the constitution of the Kingdom of Spain".
- Portugal – The Portuguese government asserted that Portugal will not recognize the unilateral Declaration of Independence issued by the government of Catalonia.
- Romania – In a press statement, the Romanian Foreign Ministry reaffirmed the country's strong support for the sovereignty and territorial integrity of Spain, rejecting firmly Catalonia's "unilateral declaration of independence", and stressing that "Romania is in favor of the respect of the international law, which does not allow for territorial changes without the consent of the state concerned".
- Serbia – Foreign Minister Ivica Dačić stated, "Serbia supports the territorial integrity of Spain and this act contradicts the Spanish constitutional system. Unlike how other countries have reacted to the Kosovo unilateral declaration of independence – Serbia firmly rejects any similar acts anywhere in the world, including Catalonia."
- Slovenia – The foreign ministry issued a statement "reiterating its position in saying that it advocated the right of nations for self-determination, which must be expressed and executed democratically, in a lawful way, and in accordance with the Spanish legislation and international law."
- Sri Lanka – Sri Lanka's Foreign Affairs Ministry said that Sri Lanka unequivocally supports the sovereignty and territorial integrity of the Kingdom of Spain, and considers Catalonia as an integral part of Spain.
- Turkey – In a statement, the Turkish Foreign Ministry says that the unilateral declaration of independence "does not represent a step in the right direction" and "does not reflect the will of the people of Spain and the region." "We consider fundamental to respect the territorial integrity of Spain, together with the Constitution and the will of the Spanish people," the text added.
- Ukraine – Ukraine's Foreign Minister Pavlo Klimkin stated, "Ukraine supports the state sovereignty and territorial integrity of Spain within its internationally recognized borders."
- Uruguay – The Ministry of Foreign Relations issued a statement in which it stated that the Uruguayan Government did not recognize the declaration of independence, and therefore supports "the unity and territorial integrity of the Kingdom of Spain". In addition, President Tabaré Vázquez declared that it is an internal matter of Spain and that it must be resolved by the Spaniards, hoping that it will be a "peaceful solution".
- Vietnam – Foreign Ministry spokeswoman Lê Thị Thu Hằng stated: "This is the internal work of Spain and should be resolved on the basis of respect for the constitution and the law, for the unity and stability of Spain".

=== Non UN-member states and UN observer states ===
- Abkhazia has stated that it may recognise Catalan independence if requested by the Catalan government.
- The Foreign Ministry of the Republic of Artsakh issued a statement of support, saying "We consider it important that the resolution of the political crisis between Barcelona and Madrid is achieved by exclusively peaceful means, through dialogue."
- Palestine stated that it supports a strong and united Spain.
- South Ossetia has expressed willingness in considering a formal recognition should they receive such a request from the Catalan government.
- (Taiwan) Republic of China stated that it "hopes for peaceful dialogue between central and regional governments of Spain to resolve the Catalonia issue."

=== Devolved governments ===
- Flemish Region: The Minister-President of Flanders, Geert Bourgeois, showed support for the Catalan Republic, but acknowledged the decision is up to the Belgian federal government.
- Quebec: Philippe Couillard, the Premier of Quebec, condemned the violence in Barcelona and encouraged dialogue between both sides. The National Assembly of Quebec unanimously passed a motion on 4 October 2017 condemning Spain's "authoritarianism" and called for the Spanish and Catalan governments to enter international mediation if they could not reach a peaceful solution.
- Corsica: The President of the Corsican Assembly, Jean-Guy Talamoni, expressed his support for Catalan independence.
- Sardinia: Over 100 mayors and local administrators from Sardinia "recognized" Catalan independence. Two days before the declaration, the Sardinian council had already issued a resolution condemning the violence and expressing the wish that Catalans may pursue a peaceful path towards the right to choose any political option, including self-determination.
- Scotland: The Cabinet Secretary for External Affairs, Fiona Hyslop, said: "We understand and respect the position of the Catalan Government. While Spain has the right to oppose independence, the people of Catalonia must have the ability to determine their own future. The imposition of direct rule cannot be the solution and should be of concern to democrats everywhere. The European Union has a political and moral responsibility to support dialogue to identify how the situation can be resolved peacefully and democratically."
- Wales: First Minister of Wales Carwyn Jones said in a statement: "Sadly what we've seen in recent few weeks has been a worrying cycle of escalation, intimidation and brinkmanship, when what this situation needs is dialogue and diplomacy. It is surely in the interests of all people in Catalonia and the whole of Spain to make a lasting settlement based on mutual respect".

=== International organisations ===
- European Union – On 27 October, Donald Tusk, President of the European Council, declared: "For EU nothing changes. Spain remains our only interlocutor." The President of the European Parliament, Antonio Tajani, also stated: "The declaration of independence voted on today in the Catalan Parliament is a breach of the rule of law, the Spanish constitution and the Statute of Autonomy of Catalonia, which are part of the EU's legal framework. No one in the European Union will recognize this declaration. More than ever, it is necessary to re-establish legality as a basis for dialogue and to guarantee the freedoms and rights of all Catalan citizens."
- United Nations – United Nations Secretary-General António Guterres called on the Spanish authorities and the Catalan government to seek for solutions to the current crisis within the framework of the Spanish constitution, UN Deputy Spokesman Farhan Haq told reporters on 27 October. "We are trying to follow up on the developments. For now, the Secretary-General encourages all concerned to seek solutions within the framework of the Spanish constitution and through established political and legal channels," he said.

== See also ==
- 2008 Kosovo declaration of independence
- 2017–18 Spanish constitutional crisis
- Catalan general strike
- Catalan independence
- 2017 Catalan independence referendum
- Catalan nationalism
- Declaration of the Initiation of the Process of Independence of Catalonia
- History of Catalonia
- Politics of Catalonia
- Law of juridical transition and foundation of the Republic
- History of political Catalanism
