= Law of juridical transition and foundation of the Republic =

Law of juridical transition

Parliament of Catalonia
- Long title: Law of juridical transition and foundation of the Republic
- Citation: 20/2017
- Territorial extent: Catalonia
- Considered by: Parliament of Catalonia
- Passed: 8 September 2017
- Repealed: 12 September 2017

Related legislation
- Law on the Referendum on Self-determination of Catalonia
- Status: Repealed

Law of juridical transition and foundation of the Republic (Catalan: Llei de transitorietat jurídica i fundacional de la República) is the name of a Catalan law whose objective was to guarantee a new legal framework, as well as the orderly succession of the administrations and the continuity of public services, during the transition process of Catalonia to an independent state based on the suspended referendum held the 1st of October 2017. It was drafted to function as a provisional constitution in case 'yes' won the referendum and approved.

The law was passed by the Parliament of Catalonia on September 8, 2017 with 71 votes in favor (out of 135) from the ruling coalition JxSí and CUP-CC represented by 72 seats and 47.8% of the social vote support and out-ruling the previous consensus of the Estatut framework and Spanish Constitution; the left-wing opposition party CSQP voted against it and the other opposition parties left the chamber before the votes were cast which represented an opposition of 63 seats even a 48.05% of the social vote.

The law was suspended on September 12 by the Constitutional Court of Spain after accepting an appeal from the Spanish government.

== See also ==
- Law on the Referendum on Self-determination of Catalonia
- 2017 Catalan independence referendum
- Catalan independence
- Catalan Republic
