= Jaume Alonso-Cuevillas =

Spanish academic, lawyer and politician

Jaume Alonso-Cuevillas MP
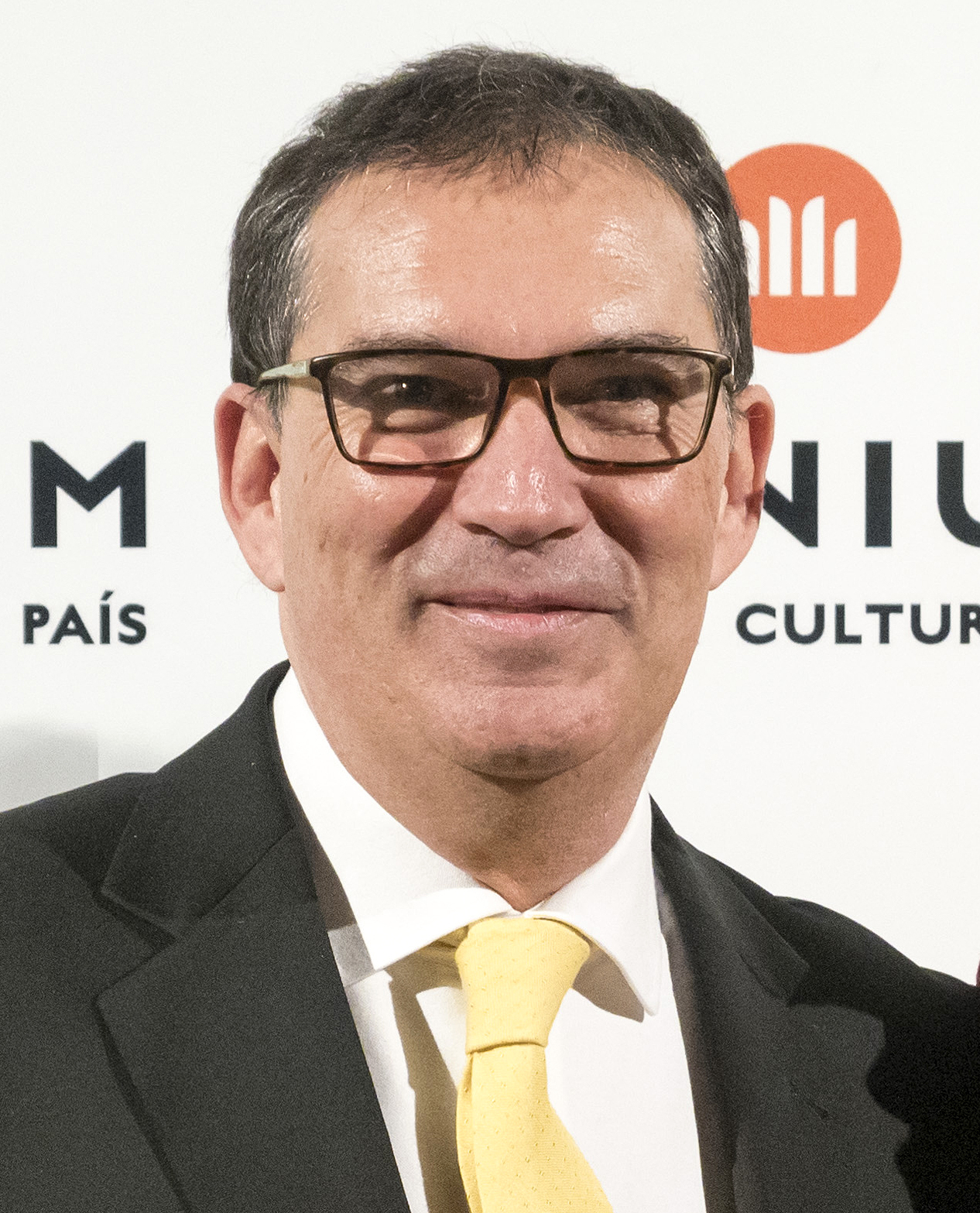
- Alonso-Cuevillas in December 2018

Second Secretary of the Parliament of Catalonia
- Incumbent
- Assumed office 12 March 2021
- Preceded by: David Pérez i Ibáñez

Member of the Parliament of Catalonia
- Incumbent
- Assumed office 12 March 2021
- Constituency: Barcelona

Member of the Congress of Deputies
- In office 4 January 2020 – 4 March 2021
- Succeeded by: Josep Pagès
- Constituency: Barcelona
- In office 16 May 2019 – 24 September 2019
- Constituency: Girona

Personal details
- Born: Jaume Alonso-Cuevillas i Sayrol; 22 November 1961 (age 64) Barcelona, Catalonia, Spain
- Party: Together for Catalonia
- Education: University of Barcelona; Abat Oliba CEU University
- Occupation: Academic
- Website: alonso-cuevillas.org

Jaume Alonso-Cuevillas i Sayrol (born 22 November 1961) is a Spanish academic, lawyer and politician from Catalonia who currently serves as Member of the Parliament of Catalonia for the pro-independence party Together for Catalonia and as Second Secretary of the Parliament of Catalonia. He previously served as Member of the Congress of Deputies of Spain between May 2019 and March 2021.

== Early life ==
Alonso-Cuevillas was born on 22 November 1961 in Barcelona, Catalonia. He is the son and brother of lawyers. He has a diploma in Catalan civil law (1984) and bachelor's degree in law (1985) from the University of Barcelona. He received a doctorate in law from the university in 1990 after producing a thesis titled La Comparecencia Preparatoria del Juicio de Menor Cuantía. He also has a bachelor's degree in economics and business administration from the Abat Oliba CEU University (2014) and a master's degree in audit of accounts (2015).

== Career ==
Alonso-Cuevillas was a scholar at the Ministry of Education and Science (1987–90). He joined the University of Barcelona in 1988 as a lecturer (professor colaborador). He was promoted to interim associate professor (professor titular interino) in 1992 and the following year became an associate professor (professor titular de universidad). In 2005 he became professor of procedural law.

Alonso-Cuevillas was dean of the Bar Association of Barcelona (1997-05), president of the Council of Catalan Law (1999-00) and president of the European Federation of the Bar Association (2007–08). He is a member of the Royal Academy of Doctors of Spain. He received the Ferran Termes Prize in 2015.

Alonso-Cuevillas is the lawyer for exiled President of Catalonia Carles Puigdemont. He contested the 2019 general election as a Together for Catalonia (JxCat) electoral alliance candidate in the Province of Girona and was elected to the Congress of Deputies.

In July 2020 Alonso-Cuevillas joined the newly formed Together for Catalonia political party. He stood in the 2021 Catalan regional election for the Province of Barcelona and was elected to the Parliament of Catalonia. On 12 March 2021 he was elected Second Secretary of the Parliament of Catalonia.

== Electoral history ==
Electoral history of Jaume Alonso-Cuevillas
Election	Constituency	Party	Alliance	No.	Result
2019 general	Province of Girona	Independent	Together for Catalonia	1	Elected
2021 regional	Province of Barcelona	Together for Catalonia	Together for Catalonia	5	Elected
