= Direct rule =

Takeover of a self-governing territory by an external power

Direct rule in political science is when an imperial or central power takes direct control over the legislature, executive and civil administration of an otherwise largely self-governing territory.

== Direct colonial rule ==
Direct colonial rule is a form of colonialism that involves the establishment of a centralized foreign authority within a territory, which is run by colonial officials. According to Michael W. Doyle of Harvard University, in a system of direct rule, the native population is excluded from all but the lowest level of the colonial government. Ugandan academic Mahmood Mamdani classifies direct rule as centralized despotism: a system where natives were not considered citizens.

The opposite of direct colonial rule is indirect rule, which integrates pre-established local elites and native institutions into the government.

== National Examples ==
=== Chechnya ===
In 1991, Chechen separatists declared independence of unrecognised Chechen Republic of Ichkeria. Russian federal armed forces invaded in 1994 and again in 1999 in response to the Invasion of Militants in Dagestan. By early 2000, Russia almost completely destroyed Grozny and put Chechnya under direct control of the federal government. The federal government declared that the conflict ended in 2002 but operations continued until 2009.

=== Germany ===
At various times in German history a federal or imperial government has acted against rebellious member states, frequently using military force. The current German Basic Law allows for the federal government to invoke emergency measures against uncooperative states, although the Bundeswehr may not be deployed in any domestic law enforcement capacity.

The Swiss Constitution affirms a similar legal concept.

=== President's rule in India ===
In the Republic of India, "President's rule" refers to the imposition of Article 356 of the Constitution of India on a state whose constitutional body has failed. In the event that a state government is unable to function, the Constitution provides for the state to come under the direct control of the central government. In other words, it is "under the President's rule". Subsequently, executive authority is exercised through the centrally appointed governor, who has the authority to appoint retired civil servants or other administrators to assist him.

When a state government is functioning correctly, it is run by an elected Council of Ministers responsible to the state's legislative assembly (Vidhan Sabha). The council is led by the Chief Minister, who is the de facto chief executive of the state; the Governor is only a de jure constitutional head. However, during President's rule, the Council of Ministers is dissolved, vacating the office of Chief Minister. Furthermore, the Vidhan Sabha is either prorogued or dissolved, necessitating a fresh election.

Similarly, in the state of Jammu and Kashmir, failure of governmental function results in "Governor's rule", imposed by invoking Section 92 of the Constitution of Jammu and Kashmir. The state’s governor issues the proclamation, after obtaining the consent of the President of India. If it is not possible to revoke Governor's rule within six months of imposition, the President's Rule under Article 356 of the Indian Constitution is imposed. There is little practical difference between the two provisions.

Following its landmark judgment in the 1994 Bommai case, the Supreme Court of India has restricted arbitrary impositions of President's rule.

Chhattisgarh and Telangana are the only states where President's rule has yet to be imposed. However, while Telangana was part of Andhra Pradesh, it was under President's rule.

=== Catalonia, Spain in 2017 ===
In 2017, the Parliament of Catalonia unilaterally declared independence from Spain amid a constitutional crisis over the result of the independence referendum. The Spanish Senate triggered Article 155 of the Spanish Constitution of 1978, and Prime Minister Mariano Rajoy dismissed the Executive Council of Catalonia, dissolving the Parliament of Catalonia.

=== United Kingdom in Northern Ireland ===
The Parliament of the United Kingdom has granted powers to the Scottish Parliament, the Senedd, the Northern Ireland Assembly and the London Assembly and to their associated executive bodies. This devolution may be suspended and replaced by direct rule by the Government of the United Kingdom.

Direct rule occurred in Northern Ireland from 1972 to 1998 during the Troubles, and for shorter periods between then and 2007. Major policy was determined by the British Government's Northern Ireland Office, under the direction of the Secretary of State for Northern Ireland. Legislation was introduced, amended, or repealed by means of Order in Council. Everyday matters were handled by government departments within Northern Ireland itself, and Northern Ireland continued to elect members of parliament to the Parliament of the United Kingdom.

== Examples of direct colonial rule ==
=== British Raj ===
Under the British Raj, India was a founding member of the League of Nations, a participating nation in the Summer Olympics in 1900, 1920, 1928, 1932, and 1936, and a founding member of the United Nations in San Francisco in 1945.

This system of governance was instituted on 28 June 1858, when, after the Indian Rebellion of 1857, the rule of the British East India Company was transferred to the Crown in the person of Queen Victoria (who, in 1876, was proclaimed Empress of India). It lasted until 1947, when Britain′s Indian Empire was partitioned into two sovereign dominion states: the Dominion of India (later the Republic of India) and the Dominion of Pakistan (later the Islamic Republic of Pakistan, the eastern part of which, still later, became the People's Republic of Bangladesh). At the inception of the Raj in 1858, Lower Burma was already a part of British India; Upper Burma was added in 1886, and the resulting union, Burma, was administered as an autonomous province until 1937, when it became a separate British colony, gaining its own independence in 1948.

=== Indochina ===
French administration in Indochina began on June 5, 1862. Following the defeat of Vietnamese, the Treaty of Saigon ceded Cochinchina's three eastern provinces. Later, the French forced Emperor Tự Đức to place Cambodia under French protection. On June 18, 1867, the French seized the rest of Cochinchina and conquered the Mekong Delta and later Hanoi. By 1897, France controlled all of Indochina.

Officially, each of the provinces – Cambodia, Laos, Annam, Tonkin, were protected while Cochinchina was qa colony and Kouang-Tchéou-Wan was a leased territory of China. In practice, however, all were ruled directly. The French adopted a policy of assimilation rather than association. The Declaration of Rights of Man was based on the principle of egalité, liberté and fraternité for all subjects and citizens of France, and the colonies could not be an exception. French language was to be the language of administration. The whole Indochina would be “Frenchized”. The Napoleonic Code was introduced in 1879 into the five provinces, sweeping away the Confucianism that has existed for centuries in Indochina.

== Alternatives ==
Indirect rule is a system of government used by the British and French to control parts of their colonial empires, particularly in Africa and Asia, through pre-existing local power structures. These dependencies were often called "protectorates" or "trucial states". By this system, the day-to-day government and administration of areas both small and large was left in the hands of traditional rulers, who gained prestige and the stability and protection afforded by the Pax Britannica, at the cost of losing control of their external affairs, and often of taxation, communications, and other matters, usually with a small number of European "advisors" effectively overseeing the government of large numbers of people spread over extensive areas.

== See also ==
- Rule by decree
- Martial law
- State of emergency
