= Law on the Referendum on Self-determination of Catalonia =

Catalan legislation

Law on the Referendum on Self-determination

Parliament of Catalonia
- Long title: Law on a Self-determination Referendum on the Independence of Catalonia
- Citation: 19/2017
- Territorial extent: Catalonia
- Considered by: Parliament of Catalonia
- Passed: 6 September 2017
- Repealed: 7 September 2017

Related legislation
- Law of juridical transition and foundation of the Republic
- Status: Repealed

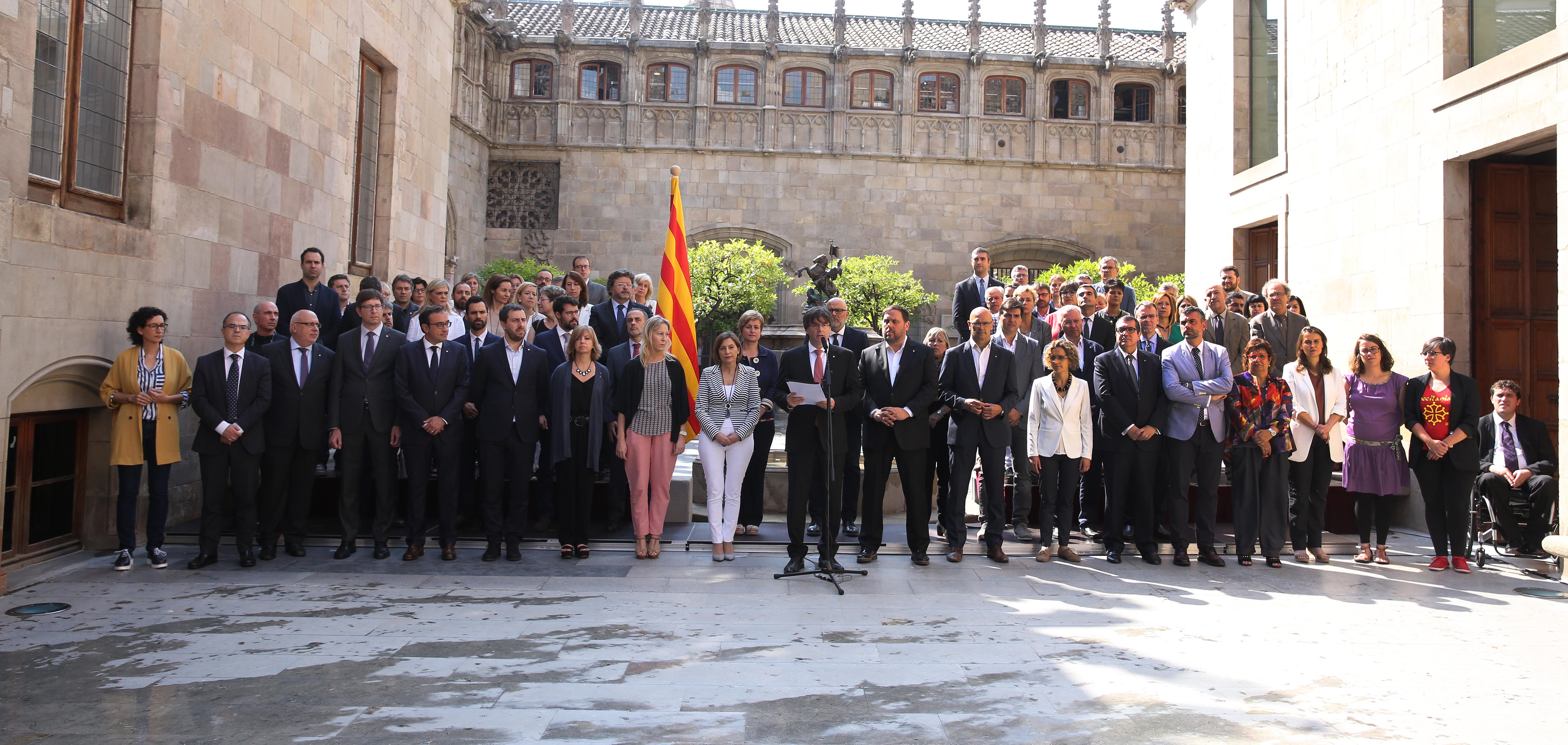
President Carles Puigdemont announces that Catalonia will hold a referendum on independence on October 1, 2017.

The Law on the Referendum on Self-determination of Catalonia (Catalan: Llei del referèndum d'autodeterminació), is the name of a Catalan law that governs the holding of the Catalan independence referendum of 1 October 2017, a binding self-determination referendum on the independence of Catalonia.

== History ==
On 6 September 2017, after more than 12 hours of heated debate, the Parliament of Catalonia passed the law with 72 votes in favor from the pro-independence ruling coalition JxSí and CUP-CC; the opposition party CSQP abstained (10 votes) and other 52 opposition parliamentarians left the chamber before the votes were cast. Even though the laws were public weeks before, the vote didn't appear on the day's agenda until the last minute to avoid the Spanish Constitutional Court banning it. Some opposition parties accused the regional body's top speaker, Carme Forcadell, of fast-tracking the law through parliament by altering the day's agenda to introduce the issue, not allowing them to appeal the law before being put up to vote. Members from JxSí acknowledged it was not their preferred method, but justified it in that it was the only way to get the bill on the floor without being blocked and that it was not "any ordinary law". In 2018, the Constitutional Court ruled that the rights of the opposition where indeed undermined.

It was suspended on 7 September by the Constitutional Court after accepting an appeal from the Spanish government.

== See also ==
- Law of juridical transition and foundation of the Republic
- 2017 Catalan independence referendum
- Catalan independence
- Catalan Republic
