= Government of Pasqual Maragall =

- Executive Council of Catalonia
- 2003–2006
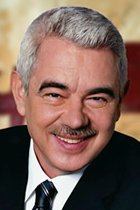
- Pasqual Maragall in 2004.
- Date formed: 22 December 2003
- Date dissolved: 29 November 2006

People and organisations
- Monarch: Felipe VI
- President: Pasqual Maragall
- First Minister: Josep-Lluís Carod-Rovira (2003–2004); Josep Bargalló (2004–2006)
- No. of ministers: 16 (Note: Does not include the President.)
- Total no. of members: 23
- Member parties: PSC; ERC (2003–2006); ICV–EUiA
- Status in legislature: Majority coalition government (2003–2006); Minority government (2006)
- Opposition party: CiU
- Opposition leader: Artur Mas

History
- Election: 2003 regional election
- Outgoing election: 2006 regional election
- Legislature term: 7th Parliament
- Budget: 2004, 2005, 2006
- Predecessor: Pujol VI
- Successor: Montilla

The government of Pasqual Maragall was formed on 22 December 2003 following the latter's election as President of the Government of Catalonia by the Parliament of Catalonia on 16 December and his swearing-in on 18 December, as a result of the Socialists' Party of Catalonia (PSC), Republican Left of Catalonia (ERC) and Initiative for Catalonia Greens–United and Alternative Left (ICV–EUiA) being able to muster a majority of seats in the Parliament following the 2003 Catalan regional election. It succeeded the sixth Pujol government and was the Government of Catalonia from 22 December 2003 to 29 November 2006, a total of 1,073 days, or 2 years, 11 months and 7 days.

Until 2006, the cabinet comprised members of PSC, ERC and ICV–EUiA, as well as a number of independents proposed by the first two parties. On 12 May 2006, Maragall expelled ERC from the government following its opposition to the new Statute of Autonomy of Catalonia in the voting held in the Cortes Generales on 30 March and 10 May, and ahead of the 18 June referendum. It was automatically dismissed on 2 November 2006 as a consequence of the 2006 regional election, but remained in acting capacity until the next government was sworn in.

== Investiture ==
Investiture; Pasqual Maragall (PSC)
Ballot →	16 December 2003
Required majority →	68 out of 135
Yes: • PSC–CpC (42); • ERC (23); • ICV–EA (9)	74 / 135
No: • CiU (46); • PP (15)	61 / 135
Abstentions	0 / 135
Absentees	0 / 135

== Cabinet changes ==
Maragall's government saw a number of cabinet changes during its tenure:

- On 31 December 2003, the Department of Governance and Public Administration was rebranded as the Department of Governance and Public Administrations.
- On 27 January 2004, Josep-Lluís Carod-Rovira announced his resignation as first minister after it was unveiled that he held a meeting with the terrorist organization ETA while being in office, though he remained in the cabinet as minister without portfolio until 4 February. Three weeks later, on 20 February, it was announced that Teaching minister Josep Bargalló would become new first minister, with his former post being occupied by Marta Cid.
- On 28 May 2004, the departments of Teaching and Health and Social Security were rebranded as the Education and Health departments, respectively.
- On 16 October 2004, the Trade, Tourism and Consumer Affairs minister Pere Esteve resigned because of a worsening in his health condition—he had lung cancer—and was replaced in his post by Josep Huguet. Esteve died in June 2005.
- On 21 April 2006, Maragall agreed with his coalition partners the first major reshuffle of his cabinet: the PSC replaced the officeholders of the Culture (Caterina Mieras by Ferran Mascarell), Agriculture, Livestock and Fisheries (Antoni Siurana by Jordi William Carnes) and Labour and Industry (Josep Maria Rañé by Jordi Valls) ministries; ERC had Xavier Vendrell and Manuel Balcells replacing Joan Carretero and Carles Solà at the helm of the Governance and Public Administrations and Universities, Research and Information Society departments, respectively; and Francesc Baltasar became the new ICV minister of Environment and Housing in place of Salvador Milà.
- On 11 May 2006, Maragall expelled all ERC ministers from the government, effective the next day, following the party's opposition to the new Statute of Autonomy of Catalonia, which had been voted in the Cortes Generales on 30 March and 10 May, and ahead of the 18 June referendum. The ordinary discharge of duties from ERC-held departments were temporarily re-assigned to PSC ministers until a reorganization took place on 15 May: Xavier Sabaté became new minister of Governance and Public Administrations, Joan Manuel del Pozo was appointed at the helm of the newly-restructured Education and Universities department, whereas Carme Figueras was put in charge of the Welfare and Family Affairs portfolio; the Trade, Tourism and Consumer Affairs and the Universities, Research and Information Society departments were disestablished, their competences transferred to the Economy and Finance and Education and Universities ministries, respectively.

== Executive Council ==
The Executive Council was structured into the offices for the president, 16 ministries and the post of the spokesperson of the Government.

← Maragall Government → (22 December 2003 – 29 November 2006)
Portfolio	Name	Party	Took office	Left office	Ref.
President	Pasqual Maragall	PSC	18 December 2003	28 November 2006	
First Minister; Minister of the Presidency	Josep-Lluís Carod-Rovira	ERC	22 December 2003	27 January 2004	
Minister of Institutional Relations and Participation	Joan Saura	ICV	22 December 2003	29 November 2006	
Minister of Territorial Policy and Public Works; Spokesperson of the Government	Joaquim Nadal	PSC	22 December 2003	15 May 2006	
Minister of Justice	Josep Maria Vallès	PSC (CpC)	22 December 2003	29 November 2006	
Minister of the Interior	Montserrat Tura	PSC	22 December 2003	29 November 2006	
Minister of Economy and Finance	Antoni Castells	PSC	22 December 2003	29 November 2006	
Minister of Governance and Public Administration	Joan Carretero	ERC	22 December 2003	31 December 2003	
Minister of Teaching	Josep Bargalló	ERC	22 December 2003	23 February 2004	
Minister of Culture	Caterina Mieras	PSC	22 December 2003	21 April 2006	
Minister of Health and Social Security	Marina Geli	PSC	22 December 2003	28 May 2004	
Minister of Agriculture, Livestock and Fisheries	Antoni Siurana	PSC	22 December 2003	21 April 2006	
Minister of Labour and Industry	Josep Maria Rañé	PSC	22 December 2003	21 April 2006	
Minister of Trade, Tourism and Consumer Affairs	Pere Esteve	ERC	22 December 2003	16 October 2004	
Minister of Welfare and Family Affairs	Anna Simó	ERC	22 December 2003	12 May 2006	
Minister of Environment and Housing	Salvador Milà	ICV	22 December 2003	21 April 2006	
Minister of Universities, Research and Information Society	Carles Solà	ERC (Ind.)	22 December 2003	21 April 2006	
=== Changes December 2003 ===
Portfolio	Name	Party	Took office	Left office	Ref.
Minister of Governance and Public Administrations (Note: On 31 December 2003, the Department of Governance and Public Administration was rebranded as the Department of Governance and Public Administrations.)	Joan Carretero	ERC	31 December 2003	21 April 2006	
=== Changes January 2004 ===
Portfolio	Name	Party	Took office	Left office	Ref.
Minister of the Presidency	Vacant from 27 January to 23 February 2004.				
~~First Minister~~ (Note: On 29 January 2004, the Department of the First Minister was disestablished and its competences temporarily transferred to the Governance and Public Administrations, Teaching, Welfare and Family Affairs and Presidency departments.)	Disestablished on 29 January 2004.				
Minister without portfolio	Josep-Lluís Carod-Rovira	ERC	29 January 2004	4 February 2004	
=== Changes 4 February 2004 ===
Portfolio	Name	Party	Took office	Left office	Ref.
~~Minister without portfolio~~	Discontinued on 4 February 2004 upon the officeholder's dismissal.				
=== Changes 23 February 2004 ===
Portfolio	Name	Party	Took office	Left office	Ref.
First Minister (Note: On 23 February 2004, the Department of the Presidency was reorganized as the Department of the First Minister.)	Josep Bargalló	ERC	23 February 2004	12 May 2006	
Minister of Teaching	Marta Cid	ERC	23 February 2004	28 May 2004	
=== Changes May 2004 ===
Portfolio	Name	Party	Took office	Left office	Ref.
Minister of Education (Note: On 28 May 2004, the departments of Teaching and Health and Social Security were rebranded as the Education and Health departments, respectively.)	Marta Cid	ERC	28 May 2004	12 May 2006	
Minister of Health	Marina Geli	PSC	28 May 2004	29 November 2006	
=== Changes October 2004 ===
Portfolio	Name	Party	Took office	Left office	Ref.
Minister of Trade, Tourism and Consumer Affairs	Josep Huguet	ERC	16 October 2004	12 May 2006	
=== Changes April 2006 ===
Portfolio	Name	Party	Took office	Left office	Ref.
Minister of Governance and Public Administrations	Xavier Vendrell	ERC	21 April 2006	12 May 2006	
Minister of Culture	Ferran Mascarell	PSC	21 April 2006	29 November 2006	
Minister of Agriculture, Livestock and Fisheries	Jordi William Carnes	PSC	21 April 2006	29 November 2006	
Minister of Labour and Industry	Jordi Valls	PSC	21 April 2006	29 November 2006	
Minister of Environment and Housing	Francesc Baltasar	ICV	21 April 2006	29 November 2006	
Minister of Universities, Research and Information Society	Manuel Balcells	ERC	21 April 2006	12 May 2006	
=== Changes 12 May 2006 ===
Portfolio	Name	Party	Took office	Left office	Ref.
Minister of the Presidency (Note: On 12 May 2004, the Department of the First Minister was reorganized as the Department of the Presidency.)	Vacant from 12 to 15 May 2006.				
Minister of Governance and Public Administrations	Joan Saura took on the ordinary discharge of duties from 12 to 15 May 2006.				
Minister of Education	Marina Geli took on the ordinary discharge of duties from 12 to 15 May 2006.				
Minister of Trade, Tourism and Consumer Affairs	Antoni Castells took on the ordinary discharge of duties from 12 to 15 May 2006.				
Minister of Welfare and Family Affairs	Marina Geli took on the ordinary discharge of duties from 12 to 15 May 2006.				
Minister of Universities, Research and Information Society	Antoni Castells took on the ordinary discharge of duties from 12 to 15 May 2006.				
=== Changes 15 May 2006 ===
Portfolio	Name	Party	Took office	Left office	Ref.
Minister of the Presidency; Minister of Territorial Policy and Public Works; Spokesperson of the Government	Joaquim Nadal	PSC	15 May 2006	29 November 2006	
Minister of Governance and Public Administrations	Xavier Sabaté	PSC	15 May 2006	29 November 2006	
Minister of Education and Universities (Note: On 15 May 2006, the ministry of Education was reorganized as the Education and Universities department. Concurrently, the ministries of Trade, Tourism and Consumer Affairs the Universities, Research and Information Society were disestablished and their competences transferred to the Economy and Finance and Education and Universities departments, respectively.)	Joan Manuel del Pozo	PSC	15 May 2006	29 November 2006	
~~Minister of Trade, Tourism and Consumer Affairs~~	Disestablished on 15 May 2006.				
Minister of Welfare and Family Affairs	Carme Figueras	PSC	15 May 2006	29 November 2006	
~~Minister of Universities, Research and Information Society~~	Disestablished on 15 May 2006.				

== Notes ==
Preceded by Pujol VI	Government of Catalonia; 2003–2006	Succeeded by Montilla
