= Government of José Montilla =

Montilla Government
- Executive Council of Catalonia
- 2006–2010
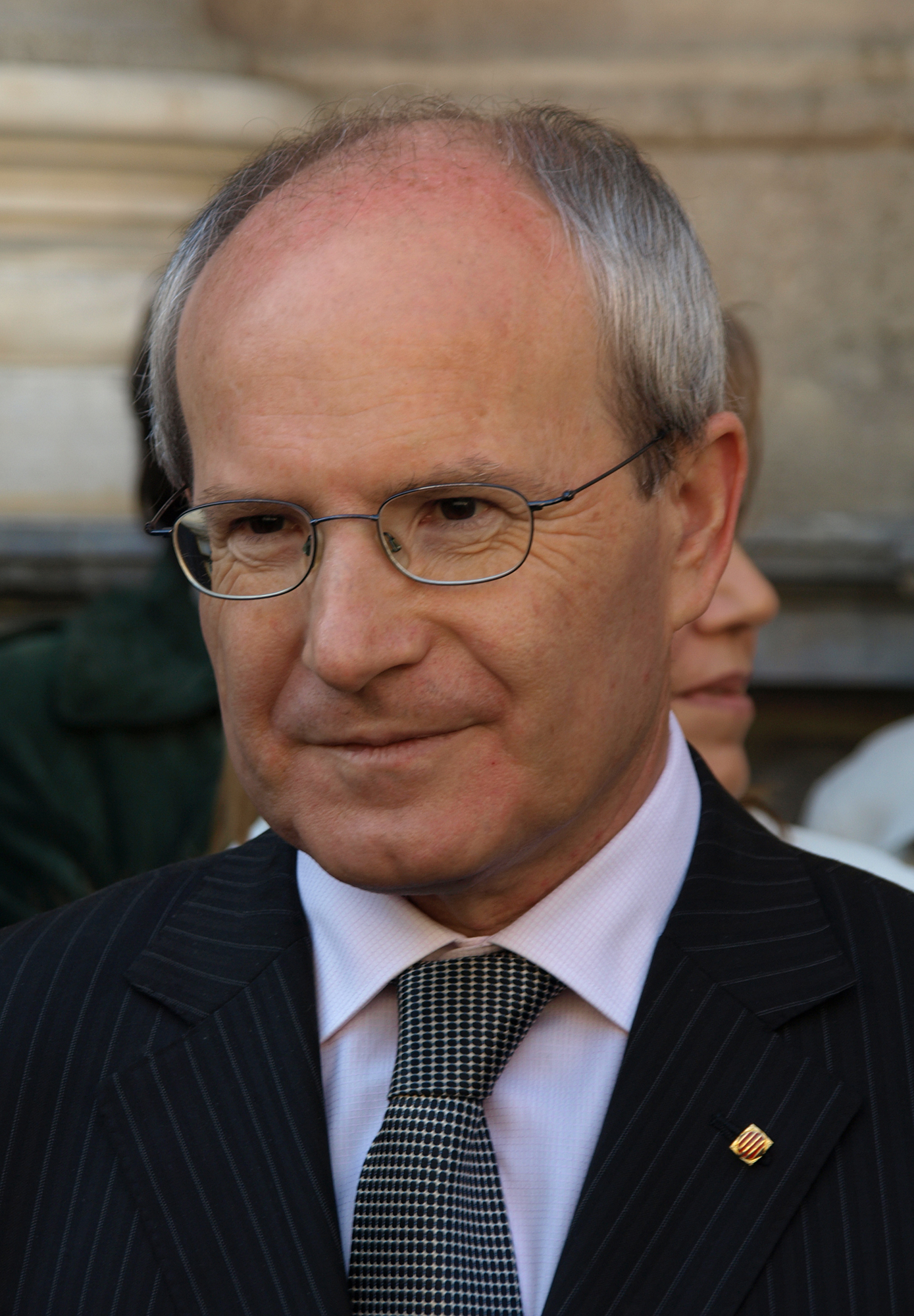
- José Montilla
- Date formed: 28 November 2006
- Date dissolved: 29 December 2010

People and organisations
- Head of government: José Montilla
- Deputy head of government: Josep-Lluís Carod-Rovira
- Member party: Initiative for Catalonia Greens–United and Alternative Left; Republican Left of Catalonia; Socialists' Party of Catalonia
- Status in legislature: Majority coalition
- Opposition party: Convergence and Union
- Opposition leader: Artur Mas

History
- Election: 2006 regional election
- Outgoing election: 2010 regional election
- Legislature term: VIII Legislature (2006–2010)
- Budget: 2007, 2008, 2009, 2010
- Predecessor: Maragall
- Successor: Mas I

The Montilla Government was the regional government of Catalonia led by President José Montilla between 2006 and 2010. It was formed in November 2006 following the regional election and ended in December 2010 following the regional election.

== Executive Council ==
Name	Portrait	Party	Office	Took office	Left office	Refs
José Montilla		Socialists' Party of Catalonia	President	28 November 2006	24 December 2010	
Josep-Lluís Carod-Rovira		Republican Left of Catalonia	Vice President	29 November 2006	29 December 2010	
Jordi Ausàs		Republican Left of Catalonia	Minister of Governance and Public Administration	12 March 2008	29 December 2010	
Francesc Baltasar i Albesa		Initiative for Catalonia Greens	Minister of Environment and Housing	29 November 2006	29 December 2010	
Carme Capdevila i Palau		Republican Left of Catalonia	Minister of Social Action and Citizenship	29 November 2006	29 December 2010	
Antoni Castells		Socialists' Party of Catalonia	Minister of Economy and Finance	29 November 2006	29 December 2010	
Maria del Mar Serna Calvo		Independent	Minister of Employment	29 November 2006	29 December 2010	
Marina Geli		Socialists' Party of Catalonia	Minister of Health	29 November 2006	29 December 2010	
Josep Huguet		Republican Left of Catalonia	Minister of Innovation, Universities and Enterprise	29 November 2006	29 December 2010	
Joaquim Llena i Cortina		Socialists' Party of Catalonia	Minister of Agriculture, Food and Rural Action	29 November 2006	29 December 2010	
Ernest Maragall		Socialists' Party of Catalonia	Minister of Education	29 November 2006	29 December 2010	
Joaquim Nadal		Socialists' Party of Catalonia	Minister of Town and Country Planning and Public Works	29 November 2006	29 December 2010	
Joan Puigcercós		Republican Left of Catalonia	Minister of Governance and Public Administration	29 November 2006	10 March 2008	
Joan Saura		Initiative for Catalonia Greens	Minister of Home Affairs, Institutional Relations and Participation (Note: Department d'Interior in Catalan; Home Affairs is the "official" translation according to the Generalitat. Public Safety perhaps better capture the "idea" of the department, but Interior Department is frequently used in the English-language media for similarly named agencies in other governments despite the fact that, for example, the U.S. Department of the Interior has a much different portfolio.)	29 November 2006	29 December 2010	
Joan Manuel Tresserras i Gaju		Independent	Minister of Culture and the Media	29 November 2006	29 December 2010	
Montserrat Tura		Socialists' Party of Catalonia	Minister of Justice	29 November 2006	29 December 2010	

== Other appointments ==
Name	Office	Took office	Left office	Refs
Enric Aloy Bosch	Secretary General of Innovation, Universities and Enterprise	30 November 2006		
Jordi Bertran Muntaner	Secretary General of Agriculture, Food and Rural Action	30 November 2006		
Joan Boada i Masoliver	Secretary General of Home Affairs, Institutional Relations and Participation	30 November 2006		
Martí Carnicer i Vidal	Secretary General of Economy and Finance	30 November 2006		
Jordi Rustullet Carved	Secretary General of Social Action and Citizenship	30 November 2006		
Antoni Fernández Pérez	Secretary General of Employment	30 November 2006		
Ramon García-Bragado i Acín	Secretary of the Government	30 November 2006		
Carmina Llumà i Ras	Secretary General of Town and Country Planning and Public Works	30 November 2006		
Aurora Massip i Treig	Government Spokesperson	4 September 2007		
Joan Mauri Majós	Secretary General of Justice	30 November 2006		
Lluís Noguera i Jordana	Secretary General of Culture and the Media	30 November 2006		
Rafel Niubò i Baqué	Secretary General of the Vice-Presidency	30 November 2006		
Jaume Oliveras i Maristany	Secretary General of Governance and Public Administration	30 November 2006		
Eduard Pallejà i Sedó	Secretary General of Environment and Housing	30 November 2006		
Marta Segura Bonet	Secretary General of Health	30 November 2006		
Isaías Táboas Suárez	Secretary General of the Presidency	30 November 2006		
Francesc Vidal i Pla	Secretary General of Education	30 November 2006		
