= List of ministers of education of Catalonia =

Minister of Education of Catalonia
- Conseller d'Educació i Formació Professional de Catalunya
- Flag of Catalonia

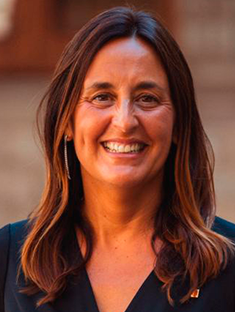
- Incumbent; Esther Niubó since 12 August 2024
- Department of Education
- Member of: Executive Council of Catalonia
- Reports to: President of Catalonia
- Seat: Barcelona
- Appointer: President of Catalonia
- Inaugural holder: Rafael Campalans or Ventura Gassol
- Formation: 15/28 April 1931; 5 December 1977 (reestablished)
- Salary: €124,391.86 per year
- Website: Department of Education, Catalonia

This article lists the ministers of education of Catalonia.

== List of officeholders ==
Office name:

- Ministry of Instruction (Catalan: Conselleria d'Instrucció) (1931)
- Ministry of Public Instruction (Catalan: Conselleria d'Instrucció Pública) (1931–1932)
- Ministry of Education and Culture (Catalan: Conselleria d'Ensenyament i Cultura) (1977–1980)
- Ministry of Education (Catalan: Departament d'Ensenyament) (1980–2004, 2010–2018), (Catalan: Departament d'Educació) (2004–2006, 2006–2010, 2018–2024)
- Ministry of Education and Universities (Catalan: Departament d'Educació i Universitats) (2006)
- Ministry of Education and Vocational Training (Catalan: Departament d'Educació i Formació Professional) (2024–present)

Portrait	Name (Birth–Death)	Term of office			Party	Government	President of Catalonia (Tenure)	Ref.
Portrait	Name (Birth–Death)	Took office	Left office	Duration	Party	Government	President of Catalonia (Tenure)	Ref.
	Rafael Campalans (1887–1933)	15 April 1931	28 April 1931	13 days	USC	Macià I (Catalan Republic)	Francesc Macià (1931–1933)	
	Ventura Gassol (1893–1980)	28 April 1931	19 December 1932	1 year and 248 days	ERC	Macià II (Provisional)	Francesc Macià (1931–1933)	
Office disestablished during this interval. (Note: The department's competences were transferred to the Catalan Ministry of Culture between 1932 and 1939. Catalan institutions were completely abolished between 1939 and 1977.)
	Pere Pi-Sunyer (1918–2001)	5 December 1977	9 May 1980	2 years and 155 days	CDC	Tarradellas (Provisional)	Josep Tarradellas (1954 (Note: In exile until 17 October 1977.)–1980)	
	Joan Guitart (born 1937)	9 May 1980	19 June 1984	8 years and 57 days	CDC	Pujol I	Jordi Pujol (1980–2003)	
	Joan Guitart (born 1937)	19 June 1984	5 July 1988	8 years and 57 days	CDC	Pujol II	Jordi Pujol (1980–2003)	
	Josep Laporte (1922–2005)	5 July 1988	16 April 1992	4 years and 171 days	CDC	Pujol III	Jordi Pujol (1980–2003)	
	Josep Laporte (1922–2005)	16 April 1992	23 December 1992	4 years and 171 days	CDC	Pujol IV	Jordi Pujol (1980–2003)	
	Joan Maria Pujals (born 1957)	23 December 1992	12 January 1996	3 years and 170 days	CDC	Pujol IV	Jordi Pujol (1980–2003)	
	Joan Maria Pujals (born 1957)	12 January 1996	10 June 1996	3 years and 170 days	CDC	Pujol V	Jordi Pujol (1980–2003)	
	Xavier Hernández (born 1946)	10 June 1996	30 November 1999	3 years and 173 days	UDC	Pujol V	Jordi Pujol (1980–2003)	
	Carme Laura Gil (born 1935)	30 November 1999	22 December 2003	4 years and 22 days	CDC	Pujol VI	Jordi Pujol (1980–2003)	
	Josep Bargalló (born 1962)	22 December 2003	23 February 2004	63 days	ERC	Maragall	Pasqual Maragall (2003–2006)	
	Marta Cid (born 1960)	23 February 2004	12 May 2006	2 years and 78 days	ERC	Maragall	Pasqual Maragall (2003–2006)	
	Joan Manuel del Pozo (born 1948)	15 May 2006	29 November 2006	198 days	PSC	Maragall	Pasqual Maragall (2003–2006)	
	Ernest Maragall (born 1943)	29 November 2006	29 December 2010	4 years and 30 days	PSC	Montilla	José Montilla (2006–2010)	
	Irene Rigau (born 1951)	29 December 2010	27 December 2012	5 years and 16 days	CDC	Mas I	Artur Mas (2010–2016)	
	Irene Rigau (born 1951)	27 December 2012	14 January 2016	5 years and 16 days	CDC	Mas II	Artur Mas (2010–2016)	
	Meritxell Ruiz (born 1978)	14 January 2016	14 July 2017	1 year and 181 days	CDC	Puigdemont	Carles Puigdemont (2016–2017)	
	Clara Ponsatí (born 1957)	14 July 2017	28 October 2017	106 days	Independent	Puigdemont	Carles Puigdemont (2016–2017)	
Office suspended during this interval. (Note: Direct rule over Catalonia: day-to-day affairs taken over by the Spanish Ministry of Education, Culture and Sport.)
	Josep Bargalló (born 1958)	1 June 2018	26 May 2021	2 years and 359 days	ERC	Torra	Quim Torra (2018–2020)	
	Josep Gonzàlez Cambray (born 1972)	26 May 2021	12 June 2023	2 years and 17 days	ERC	Aragonès	Pere Aragonès (2021–2024)	
	Anna Simó (born 1968)	12 June 2023	12 August 2024	1 year and 61 days	ERC	Aragonès	Pere Aragonès (2021–2024)	
	Esther Niubó (born 1980)	12 August 2024	Incumbent	2 years and 26 days	PSC	Illa	Salvador Illa (2024–present)	
