= List of people from Lleida =

The following names are sorted alphabetically.

- Antoni Abad - artist (born 1956)
- Jaume Balagueró - filmmaker (born 1968)
- Josep Borrell - Politician, president of the European Parliament 2004–2007. (born 1947)
- Francesc Claverol - 18th century religious scholar, author of De ineffabile misae sacrificio y Libellum de Adventu Anti Christi.
- Pep Coll - writer (born 1949)
- Albert Costa - tennis player, olympic contestant in 2000, winner of the 2002 French Open, (born 1975)
- Leandre Cristòfol - artist, pioneer of Surrealist sculpture in Catalonia (1908–1998)
- Custo Dalmau - fashion designer (born 1959).
- Sergi Escobar - world champion track cyclist who specialises in individual and team pursuit (born 1974).
- José Espasa Anguera - founder of the precursor of Espasa-Calpe and Enciclopedia Espasa (1840–1911)
- Adolf Florensa - architect, urban planner who worked for various governments during the 20th century directing the restoration of Ciutat Vella in Barcelona.
- Miguel Ángel Gallardo - underground comic book artist, especially known for his controversial comic series Makoki, published in the Spanish magazine El Víbora.
- Indíbil (Indibilis, Andobales) king of the Ilergetes (3rd century BC).
- Lorena, singer, winner of the 5th series of Spanish Fame Academy, Operación Triunfo.
- Enrique Granados - Romantic composer (1867–1916)
- Mari Pau Huguet - Catalan TV personality, TV3 presenter.
- Bojan Krkic - (born 1990) football player.
- Josep Lladonosa - historian (1907–1990)
- Mercè Mor - dancer.
- Jaume Morera - Artist (1854–1927)
- Joan Oró - biochemist whose research has been of importance in understanding the origin of life, received several international honours for his work. (1923–2004)
- Manuel del Palacio - Satirist, journalist (1831–1906)
- Josep Pernau - journalist, satyrist (1930–2011)
- Araceli Segarra - mountaineer and model (born 1970)
- Salvador Seguí, "El Noi del Sucre" - Anarchist, secretary general of CNT in Catalonia, assassinated (1887–1923).
- Antoni Siurana - Politician; former mayor of Lleida, then Minister of Agriculture, Fisheries and Food (born 1943)
- Humbert Torres - Physician and politician, vicepresident of the Generalitat de Catalunya, member of the Spanish Parliament.
- Màrius Torres - Symbolist poet (1910–1942)
- Jaume Ulled - stage actor (born 1978)
- Josep Vallverdú - writer (1923–2026)
- Salvador Vázquez de Parga - essayist, comic book historian (born 1934)
- Ricardo Viñes - Classical pianist and composer (1875–1943)

== See also ==
- List of mayors of Lleida
- List of bishops of Lleida
