= Dídac Pestaña Rodríguez =

Spanish politician (1958–2021)

Member of the Catalan Parliament
- In office 4 August 2010 – 5 October 2010
- Preceded by: Carme Figueras
- Constituency: Barcelona

Mayor of Gavà
- In office 7 January 1985 – 10 June 2005
- Preceded by: Antonio Rodríguez Aznar
- Succeeded by: Joaquim Balsera García

Member of the Gavà City Council
- In office 23 May 1983 – 10 June 2005

Personal details
- Born: 1958 Gavà, Spain
- Died: 26 July 2021 (aged 62–63) Gavà, Spain
- Party: PSC–PSOE

Dídac Pestaña Rodríguez (1958 – 26 July 2021) was a Spanish politician.

== Biography ==
A member of the Socialists' Party of Catalonia (PSC-PSOE), Rodríguez served as its Regional Secretary for Baix Llobregat. In the 1983 Spanish local elections, he was elected to the City Council of Gavà, and was appointed Mayor on 7 January 1985 following the resignation of Antonio Rodríguez Aznar. He was re-elected in 1987, 1991, 1995, 1999, and 2003, each time earning an absolute majority. During his tenure the city council maintained a sound budget and strong resources, thanks to industrial and urban development. On 10 June 2005, he resigned and was succeeded by Joaquim Balsera i Garcia. From 2003 to 2007, he was executive vice-president of the Commonwealth of Municipalities of the Barcelona Metropolitan Area.

On 4 August 2010, Rodríguez replaced Carme Figueras following her resignation. In 2011, he was appointed vice-president of the Transports Metropolitans de Barcelona, a position he held until his retirement in 2015.

Dídac Pestaña Rodríguez died in Gavà on 26 July 2021.
