= Provisional government of Catalonia =

- 12th Cabinet of Catalonia
- 1977–1980
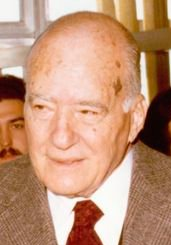
- Date formed: 5 December 1977
- Date dissolved: 28 April 1980

People and organisations
- Head of state: Juan Carlos I
- Head of government: Josep Tarradellas
- Member party: Democratic Convergence of Catalonia; Republican Left of Catalonia; Socialists' Party of Catalonia; Unified Socialist Party of Catalonia; Union of the Democratic Centre

History
- Outgoing election: 1980 regional election
- Predecessor: Catalonian government-in-exile
- Successor: Pujol I

The Provisional government of Catalonia was the regional government of Catalonia led by President Josep Tarradellas between 1977 and 1980. It was formed in December 1977 following the restoration of the Generalitat de Catalunya. It ended in April 1980 following the regional election.

== Members ==
Name	Portrait	Party	Office	Took office	Left office	Refs
Josep Tarradellas		Republican Left of Catalonia	President	5 December 1977	28 April 1980	
Lluís Armet i Coma		Socialists' Party of Catalonia	Minister of Town and Country and Public Works	24 March 1979	28 April 1980	
Josep Maria Bricall i Masip		Independent	Minister of Governance	15 December 1979	28 April 1980	
Joan Codina i Torres		Socialists' Party of Catalonia	Minister of Employment	5 December 1977	28 April 1980	
Ramon Espasa i Oliver		Unified Socialist Party of Catalonia	Minister of Health and Social Assistance	5 December 1977	28 April 1980	
Joan Josep Folchi i Bonafonte		Union of the Democratic Centre	Minister of Economy and Finance	5 December 1977	19 October 1978	
Antoni Gutiérrez Díaz		Unified Socialist Party of Catalonia	Minister Without Portfolio	5 December 1977	28 April 1980	
Manuel Ortínez i Mur		Independent	Minister of Governance	19 October 1978	7 December 1979	
Pere Pi-Sunyer i Bayo		Democratic Convergence of Catalonia	Minister of Education and Culture	5 December 1977	28 April 1980	
Jordi Pujol		Democratic Convergence of Catalonia	Minister Without Portfolio	5 December 1977	28 April 1980	
Eduard Punset		Union of the Democratic Centre	Minister of Economy and Finance	19 October 1978	28 April 1980	
Frederic Rahola i d'Espona		Republican Left of Catalonia	Minister of Governance	5 December 1977	19 October 1978	
Joan Reventós		Socialists' Party of Catalonia	Minister Without Portfolio	5 December 1977	28 April 1980	
Josep Roig i Magrinyà		Republican Left of Catalonia	Minister of Agriculture and Livestock	5 December 1977	28 April 1980	
Carles Sentís i Anfruns		Union of the Democratic Centre	Minister Without Portfolio	5 December 1977	28 April 1980	
Narcís Serra		Socialists' Party of Catalonia	Minister of Town and Country and Public Works	5 December 1977	22 March 1979	
Josep Maria Triginer i Fernández		Socialists' Party of Catalonia	Minister Without Portfolio	5 December 1977	28 April 1980	
