= List of mayors of Lleida =

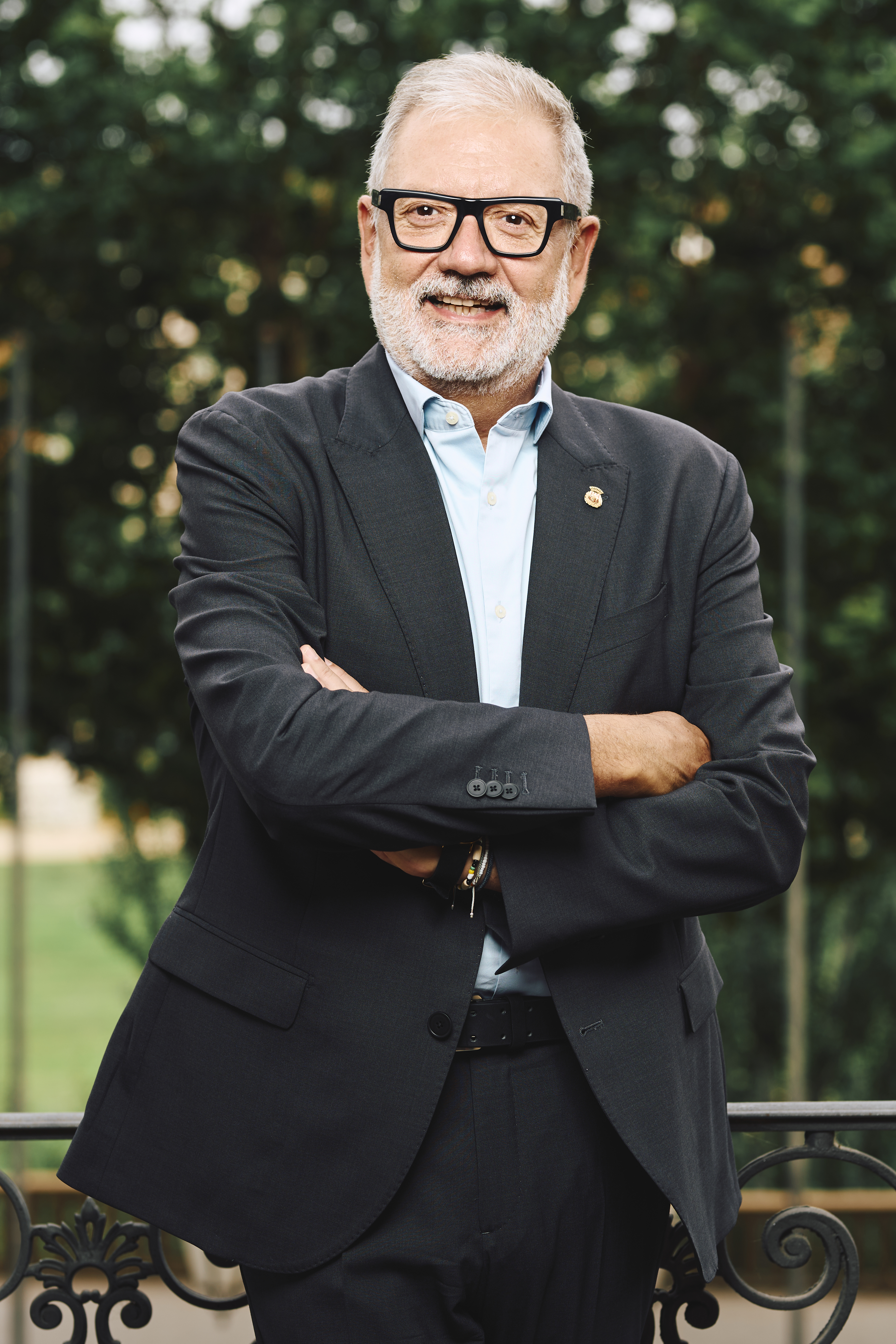
Mayor Fèlix Larrosa

The mayor of Lleida is traditionally styled Paer en cap, a privilege granted by James I of Aragon, and subsequently held by the city's governors since 1264. Lleida's city council is called La Paeria. This is a list of mayors of Lleida since 1927.

- Agustín López Morlius (1883–1889)
- José Pujol Cercós (1927–1930)
- Valentín Martín Aguado (1938–1939)
- Ramon Areny Batlle (1939–1941)
- Juan José Arnaldo Targa (1941–1943)
- Víctor Hellín Sol (1943–1952)
- Blas Mola Pintó (1952–1957)
- Francisco Pons Castellà (1957–1967)
- Juan Casimiro de Sangenís Corriá (1967–1974)
- Miguel Montaña Carrera (1974–1976)
- Ernesto Corbella Albiñana (1976–1979)
- Antoni Siurana (1979–1987)
- Manel Oronich i i Miravet (1987–1989)
- Antoni Siurana (1989–2004)
- Àngel Ros i Domingo (2004–2018)
- Fèlix Larrosa i Piqué (2018–2019)
- Miquel Pueyo i París (2019–2023)
- Fèlix Larrosa i Piqué (2023-)

== See also ==
- List of people from Lleida
- List of bishops of Lleida
- Timeline of Lleida
