= Àngels Ponsa =

Spanish politician

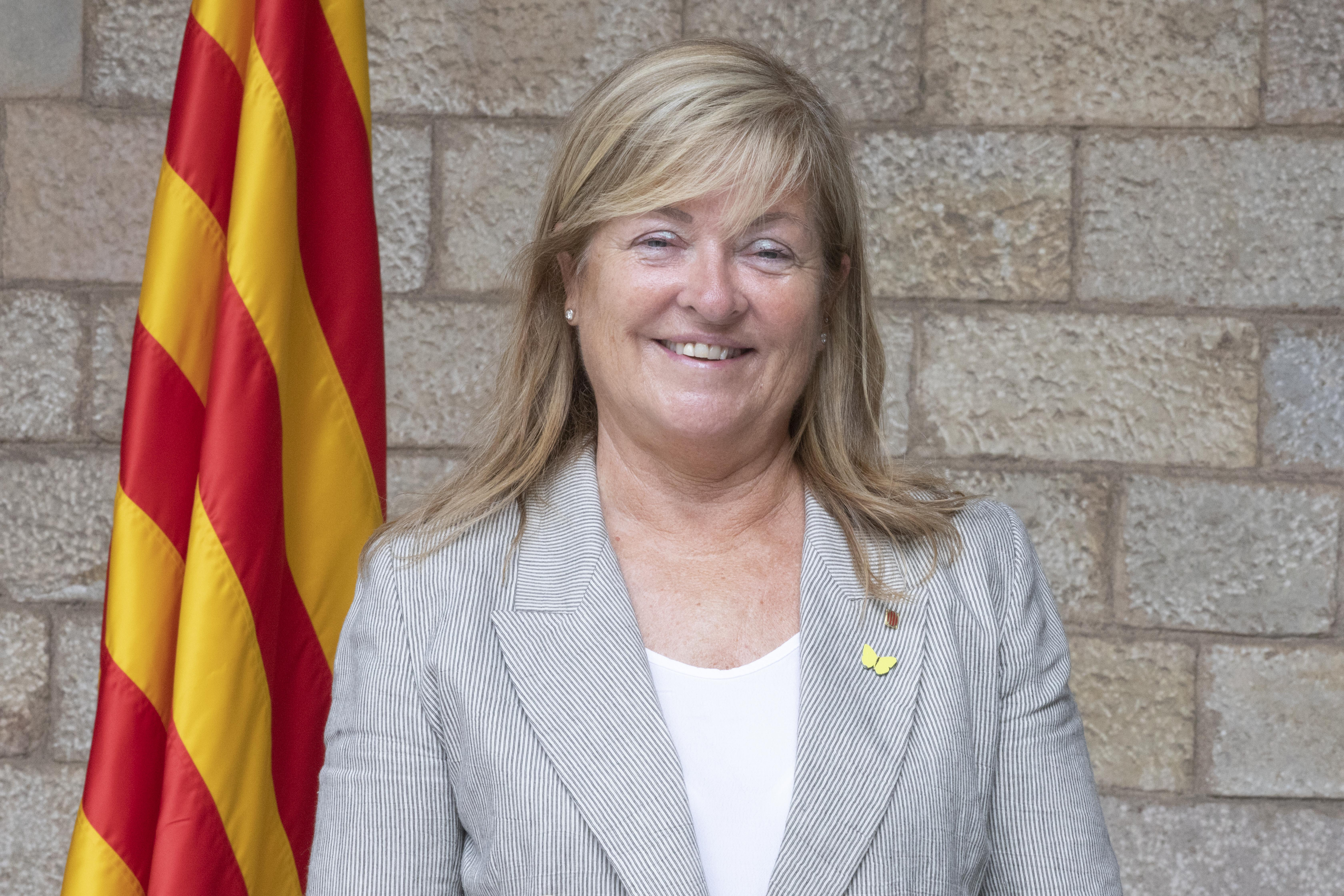
- Official portrait

Minister of Culture of Catalonia
- In office 3 September 2020 – 24 May 2021
- President: Quim Torra
- Preceded by: Mariàngela Vilallonga
- Succeeded by: Natàlia Garriga

Member of the Parliament of Catalonia
- In office 17 January 2011 – 27 October 2017
- Constituency: Barcelona

Personal details
- Born: Àngels Ponsa i Roca; 10 March 1960 (age 66) Artesa de Segre, Catalonia, Spain
- Party: Together for Catalonia
- Occupation: Professor and politician

Àngels Ponsa i Roca (born 10 March 1960) is a Spanish professor and politician from Catalonia, member of the Parliament of Catalonia in the ninth and tenth legislatures and Minister of Culture of the Government of Catalonia between September 2020 and May 2021.

== Career ==
Ponsa holds a degree in art history from the University of Barcelona and master's degree in public management from the Autonomous University of Barcelona. From 1988 to 1991, she was a teacher of art history at the Escola Massana. She has been secretary of the Òmnium Cultural delegation in Sant Cugat del Vallès and a member of the Social Language Council and the School Council of Catalonia.

As a member of the Convergència Democràtica de Catalunya, she has been a member of the Sant Cugat city council, Vallès Oriental comarca council and president of the Culture sector since 2008. After the 1995 municipal elections, she was elected deputy mayor of Sant Cugat del Vallès, and held the position until 2003.

In 2011, she replaced Jordi Cuminal, an elected deputy in the elections to the Parliament of Catalonia in 2010. In 2013, she replaced Lluís Miquel Recoder, elected deputy in the 2012 elections. She has been the spokesman for the parliamentary group of CiU in the Commission of Culture and Language of the Parliament of Catalonia.

In June 2018, she became the Director General of Cultural Cooperation. In July 2019 she was appointed Director General of Creation, Territorial Action and Libraries in accordance with a new restructuring of the Department.

On 3 September 2020, in a reshuffle of the Government, she was chosen by President Quim Torra to replace Mariàngela Vilallonga Vives as Minister of Culture of the Generalitat de Catalunya.
