= List of ambassadors of Spain to Andorra =

Ambassador of Spain to Andorra
- Coat of arms of Spain
- Incumbent; Carlos Pérez-Desoy Fages since 15 February 2023
- Ministry of Foreign Affairs; Secretariat of State for the European Union
- Style: The Most Excellent
- Residence: Andorra la Vella
- Nominator: The Foreign Minister
- Appointer: The Monarch
- Term length: At the government's pleasure
- Inaugural holder: José Manuel Paz y Agüeras
- Formation: 1993
- Website: Mission of Spain to Andorra

The ambassador of Spain to Andorra is the official representative of the Kingdom of Spain to the Principality of Andorra. The ambassador residence is at the country's capital, Andorra la Vella, and Spain also has a consulate general in the city. This consulate replaced in 1993 the historical Episcopal Veguería.

Among other units, the Education Office reports to the ambassador, which coordinates the activities of the centers of the Spanish Education System in Andorra, which are part of the Spanish Foreign Service.

== List of ambassadors ==
Ambassador		Term	Nominated by	Appointed by	Accredited to
1	José Manuel Paz y Agüeras	21 August 1993 – 18 July 1998 (4 years, 331 days)	Javier Solana	Juan Carlos I	Joan Martí i Alanis
2	Juan María López-Aguilar y Pérez-Griffo	18 July 1998 – 23 June 2001 (2 years, 340 days)	Abel Matutes	Juan Carlos I	Joan Martí i Alanis
3	César González Palacios	23 June 2001 – 9 December 2005 (4 years, 169 days)	Josep Piqué	Juan Carlos I	Joan Martí i Alanis
4	Eugeni Bregolat	9 December 2005 – 11 December 2010 (5 years, 2 days)	Miguel Ángel Moratinos	Juan Carlos I	Joan Enric Vives i Sicília
5	Alberto Moreno Humet	11 December 2010 – 7 June 2014 (3 years, 188 days)	Trinidad Jiménez	Juan Carlos I	Joan Enric Vives i Sicília
6	Manuel Montobbio de Balanzó	7 June 2014 – 28 July 2018 (4 years, 51 days)	José Manuel García-Margallo	Juan Carlos I	Joan Enric Vives i Sicília
7	Àngel Ros	4 August 2018 – 15 February 2023 (4 years, 195 days)	Josep Borrell	Felipe VI	Joan Enric Vives i Sicília
8	Carlos Pérez-Desoy Fages	15 February 2023 – present (3 years, 204 days)	José Manuel Albares	Felipe VI	Joan Enric Vives i Sicília

== See also ==
- Andorra–Spain relations
