= Josep Huguet =

Spanish politician

Josep Huguet i Biosca
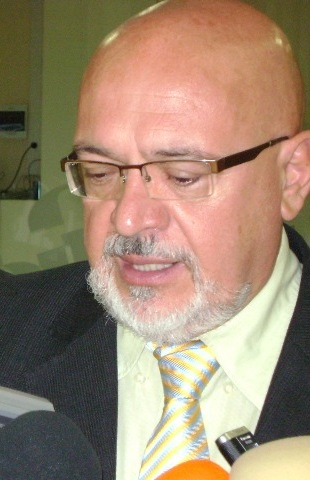

Minister of Innovation, Universities and Enterprise of the Generalitat de Catalunya
- In office 29 November 2006 – 29 December 2010
- President: José Montilla
- Preceded by: Antoni Castells (as Minister of Economy and Finance); Jordi Valls i Riera (as Minister of Employment and Industry)
- Succeeded by: Francesc Xavier Mena i López (as Minister of Enterprise and Employment); Andreu Mas-Colell (as Minister of Economy and Knowledge)

Minister of Trade, Tourism and Consumer Affairs of the Generalitat de Catalunya
- In office 16 October 2004 – 11 May 2006
- President: Pasqual Maragall
- Preceded by: Pere Esteve
- Succeeded by: Antoni Castells; As Minister of Economy and Finance; Jordi Valls i Riera; As Minister of Employment and Industry

Personal details
- Born: 8 March 1951 (age 75) Manresa, Catalonia, Spain
- Party: ERC

Josep Huguet i Biosca (born 8 March 1951) was Minister of Trade, Tourism and Consumer Affairs of the Generalitat de Catalunya from 20 October 2004 until 12 May 2006 and Minister of Innovation, Universities and Enterprise of the Generalitat de Catalunya from 29 November 2006 to 29 December 2010.

== Education and professional background ==
He has an Industrial Engineering degree by the Escola d'Enginyers Superiors de Terrassa (School of Engineers of Terrassa) and a Contemporary History degree by the UAB. He started managing an engineering business (1976), but he has also worked as teacher (1976–1982) and director (1976–1980) of the Escola de Formació Professional de Sallent (School of Professional Formation of Sallent), as well as teacher (1982–1995) and member in the board of the Institut Lacetània de Manresa (Lacetania Institute of Manresa). He has been lecturer at the Universitat Catalana d'Estiu (Catalan Summer University) from 1989 to 1994.

He wrote several History books, Social Science teaching books and Political essays. The most known are Els nacionalismes perillosos (can be translated as "The dangerous nationalisms") and Cornuts i pagar el beure (an idiom, "Crushed and complaining" is an approximated translation).

He has been member of the board of redaction of Europa de les Nacions (The Europe of Nations) (1986–1992), and has received the Avui (1986) and Jaume Casanovas (1989) prizes of journalism.

== Civic background ==
Josep Huguet was Boy Scout (1966–1975) and member of a youth club (1970–1973) as well as member of several associations. He enrolled the Confederació Sindical de Catalunya (Syndical Confederation of Catalonia) in 1980, and left it in 1994. Nowadays is member of USTEC, Unió Sindical de Treballadors de l'Ensenyament de Catalunya (Syndical Union of Teaching Workers of Catalonia).

== Political background ==
Member of the Socialist Union of Bages (1970–1977), he was affiliated and member of the board of the PSAN (Partit Socialista d'Alliberament Nacional, Socialist Party of National Liberation) between 1973 and 1980 and several other catalanist and left-winged parties. He has been cofounder of several of them.

He enrolled ERC in 1989.

== Institutional background ==
He started as deputy in the Catalan Parliament in 1995, and became spokesperson of the ERC group in October 2004. He was the ERC representative in the Mixed Commission of Transferencies State-Generalitat (1993–1995). He became Minister of Trade, Tourism and Consumer Affairs of the Generalitat in October 2004, after Pere Esteve resigned from it for health reasons.

Political offices
Preceded by Pere Esteve	Minister of Innovation, Universities and Enterprise of the Generalitat de Catalunya of the Generalitat de Catalunya; 2004 – 2006	Succeeded by Antoni Castells (as Minister of Economy and Finance holds Trade and Tourism) and Jordi Valls i Riera (as Minister of Employment and Industry holds Consumer Affairs)
Preceded by Antoni Castells (as Minister of Economy and Finance holds Trade and Tourism) and Jordi Valls i Riera (as Minister of Employment and Industry holds Consumer Affairs)	Minister of Innovation, Universities and Enterprise of the Generalitat de Catalunya of the Generalitat de Catalunya; 2006 – 2010	Succeeded by Francesc Xavier Mena i López (as Minister of Enterprise and Employment); Andreu Mas-Colell (as Minister of Economy and Knowledge)
