= Xavier Vendrell =

Spanish entrepreneur and politician

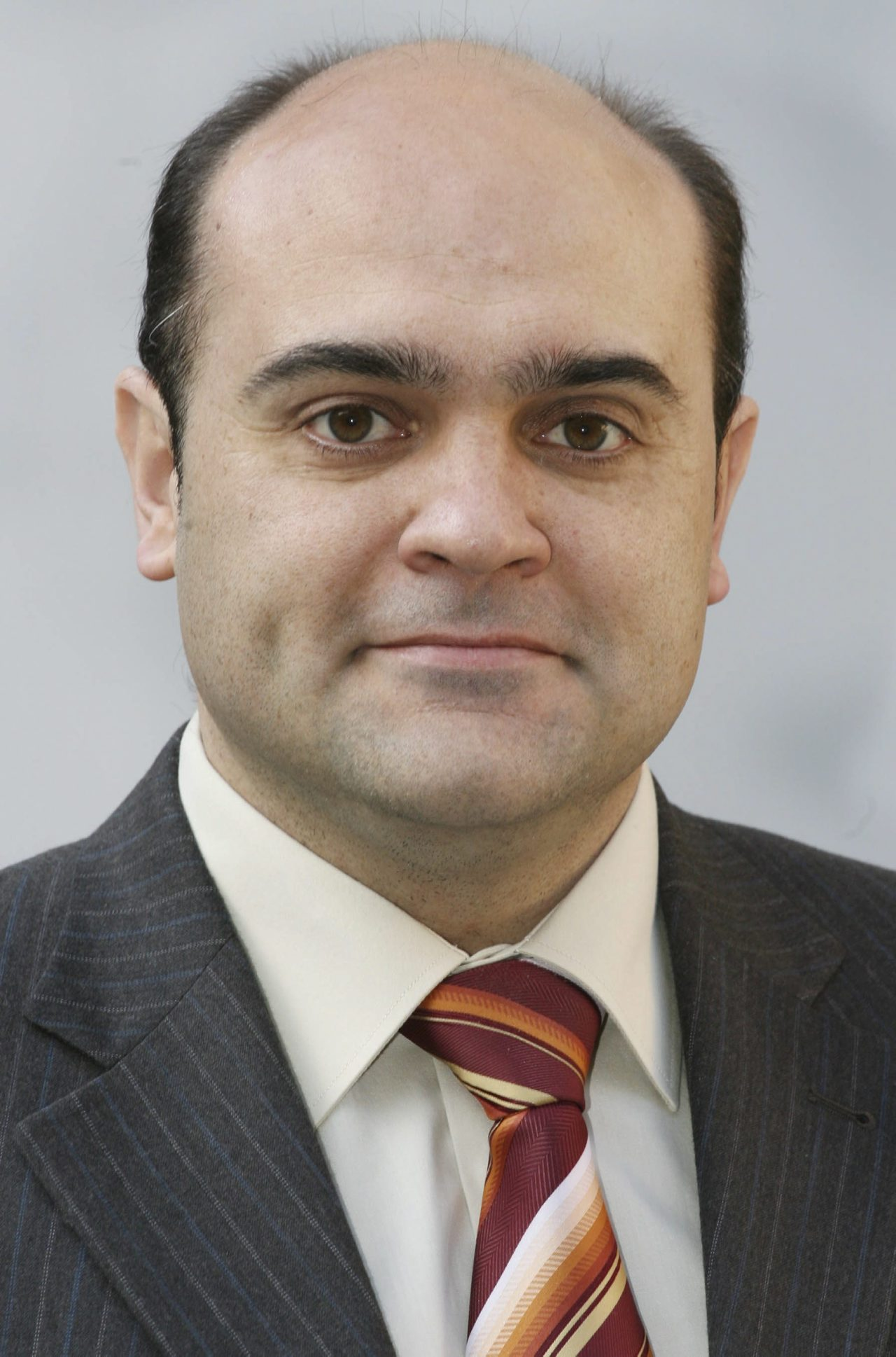
- Xavier Vendrell (2006)

Counsellor of Governance and Public Administration of the Generalitat de Catalunya
- In office 20 April 2006 – 11 May 2006
- President: Pasqual Maragall
- First Minister: Josep Bargalló
- Preceded by: Joan Carretero
- Succeeded by: Xavier Sabaté i Ibarz

Personal details
- Born: 15 October 1966 (age 59) Sant Joan Despí (Baix Llobregat)
- Party: ERC

Xavier Vendrell i Segura (born 15 October 1966) is a Spanish entrepreneur. He presides over the Colombo-Catalan Chamber of Commerce and is chief executive officer of Barcelona Export Group and Biomek Group. He is a social democrat politician, and spent more than twenty years dedicated to politics on the Esquerra Republicana de Catalunya party. After politics he focused on business.

== Early life ==
He studied electronic industrial engineering at Universitat Politècnica de Catalunya from 1984 to 1988 and political science at the Universidad Nacional de Educación a Distancia. In 2005 he completed postgraduate studies about directorate-general for enterprise in the Universitat Oberta de Catalunya.

== Career ==
His career began as a salesperson in family food distributor DISBAIX at the end of the 80s. He then managed the cooperative DIPEC which belongs to the same sector.

=== Politics ===
He was a member of the "Unió Excursionista de Catalunya" or Unión Excursionista de Cataluña (UEC) beginning in 1976 and was on the committee between 1984 and 1986. In 1988 he was president of the Asamblea de Estudiantes Independentistas de Universidad (AEIU). After some years of affiliation to the independent left extra-parliamentary, in 1991 he joins the Esquerra Republicana de Catalunya party, and the same year he is elected regional President, until the 1994. In 1996 he is named Organization and Finance National Secretary of the party. He reaches his highest point being General Vice-secretary from 2006 to 2008.

At institutional level, in 1995 he is elected city councillor of the Sant Joan Despí city hall, taking charge of the environment department and being representative of the Baix Llobregat regional board, where he is responsible of the Consumption and Tourism area. In his second local mandate he is named Control and Monitoring Deputy Mayor, as well as Representative in the Metropolitan Community of Municipalities, at the beginning of 1999. At the end of the same year, he is elected Member of the Parliament of Catalonia, position that he holds until the 2010, including the interval on the Catalan Government. During this period in the Government he develops the general secretary functions of the Catalan Head of Government and the Government and Public Administration Counsellor of the Catalan Government.

In 2007 he publishes a book entitled Disculpin les molèsties, in which he explains "the best kept secrets of his party", Esquerra Republicana de Catalunya and of the Catalan left government that ruled Catalonia from 2003 to the end of the 2010, through a personal point of view. He presents the book in Barcelona 8 July in 2007 in front of a thousand people, approximately.

Preceded by Joan Carretero	Counsellor of Governance and Public Administration; 2006	Succeeded by Xavier Sabaté i Ibarz

During the early 90s he worked at supermarket chain Bonpreu-Esclat working to implement catalog sales. When he entered the political sector, he combined party responsibilities with management of the transport enterprise Amunt i Avall, until the mid-1990s.

After dedicating 15 years to the political sector (1996–2010), he assumed the management of Biomek group, a group of health enterprises dedicated to corporal harm evaluation through biomechanics. This group provides solutions in this field, dedicated to research and development (Biomechanics Analysis). Another business is dedicated to the rent and sale of laboratories (Easy Beomechanics) and a third dedicated to the execution of biomechanical tests (Injury Certification).

In 2011 he founded Barcelona Export Group, a consultancy dedicated to globalizing European enterprises. This enterprise is focused on Latin America, while developing projects in China, Pakistan and the Persian Gulf. The company is headquartered in Barcelona and in Latin America, with headquarters in Bogotá.
