= José Zaragoza =

Spanish politician (born 1961)

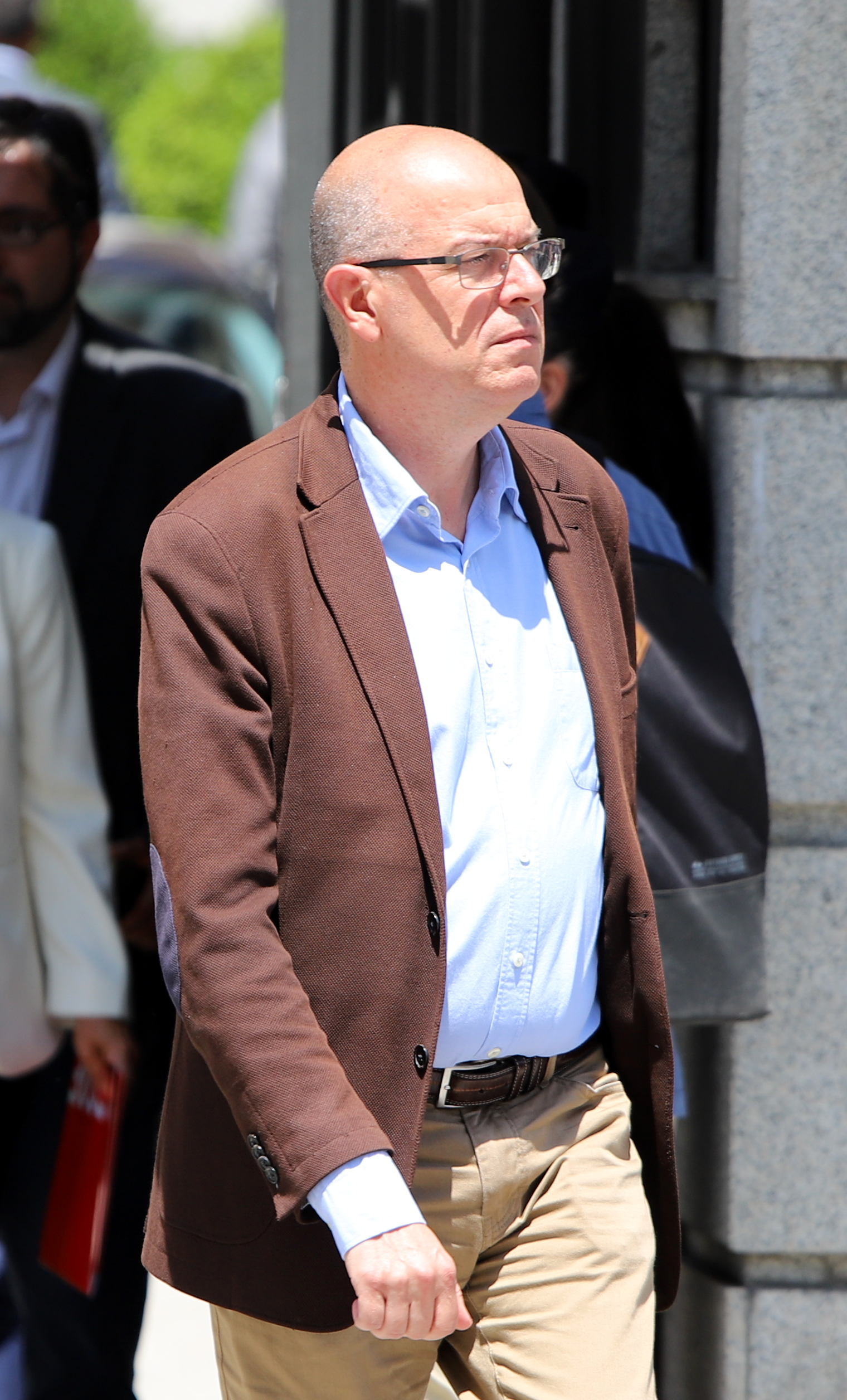
- Zaragoza in 2019

Member of the Congress of Deputies
- Incumbent
- Assumed office 13 December 2011
- Constituency: Barcelona

Personal details
- Born: 12 September 1961 (age 64)
- Party: Socialists' Party of Catalonia
- Spouse: Carme Figueras

José Zaragoza Alonso (born 12 September 1961) is a Spanish politician serving as a member of the Congress of Deputies since 2011. He has served as chairman of the constitutional committee since 2023.
