= Salvador Milà =

Spanish politician (born 1953)

Salvador Milà i Solsona

Minister of the Environment and Housing of the Generalitat de Catalunya
- In office December 20, 2003 – April 20, 2006
- Preceded by: Ramon Espadaler i Parcerisas
- Succeeded by: Francesc Baltasar i Albesa

Personal details
- Born: 1953 (age 72–73) Barcelona (Barcelonès)
- Party: ICV

Salvador Milà i Solsona is a former Minister of the Environment and Housing of the Catalan Government by the Iniciativa per Catalunya Verds (ICV) party.

== Education ==
Milà was born in 1953. He studied Law at the Universitat de Barcelona (between 1970 and 1975). Since then, he has been working as a lawyer in Mataró, specializing in administrative, urban development and civil law.

== Political background ==
In 1975 he joined the Unified Socialist Party of Catalonia (PSUC), after years of collaboration with it and Bandera Roja (Red Flag), and became a member of the Democratic Assembly of Mataró.

== Institutional background ==
Milà was elected Town Councilor of Mataró in 1979 for the PSUC list, headed by Antoni Segarra, where he took care of urban development until 1984.

In 1987, he headed the ICV lists, and repeated this heading in 1991, 1995 and 1999 elections. Between 1992 and 1999 he was again in charge of urban development, but in 1999 he passed over to the opposition. He left his municipal responsibilities in the elections of 2003.

Milà is member of the National Political Committee of ICV, and collaborates with the Europe Thematic Organization.

He was nominated Minister of the Environment and Housing of the Government of the Generalitat de Catalunya on 16 December 2003.

Preceded by Ramon Espadaler i Parcerisas	Minister of the Environment and Housing; 2003–2006	Succeeded by Francesc Baltasar i Albesa
