= Fèlix Larrosa =

Catalonian politician

Fèlix Larrosa i Piqué (born 25 September 1964) is a Spanish Socialist Workers' Party (PSOE) politician. He has been a city councillor in Lleida in Catalonia since 2011, and mayor from 2018 to 2019 and again since 2023. He was previously a member of the Congress of Deputies from 2008 to 2011.

== Biography ==
Larrosa was born in Lleida, Catalonia. His father was Félix Larrosa Gaston (1932–2018), a footballer who played as a goalkeeper in the 1950s for Segunda División clubs UD Huesca and UE Lleida. As of 2018, Larrosa was married and had three daughters.

Larrosa has a law degree, and a diploma in tourism from ESADE, a private business school in Barcelona. Representing the Socialists' Party of Catalonia (PSC), he was elected to the Congress of Deputies in the 2008 Spanish general election by the Lleida constituency. In 2011, he was elected to his hometown's city council. He became second deputy to mayor Àngel Ros in 2015, and the mayor resigned to become the ambassador to Andorra. Larrosa ran in the primary against the first deputy, Montse Mínguez. He won the nomination and was elected mayor by the eight PSC members of the council and the one from United to Advance.

In the 2019 local elections, the first since the Catalan declaration of independence, the PSC lost Lleida to Catalan nationalist parties. Miquel Pueyo of the Republican Left of Catalonia (ERC) was installed with support from Together for Catalonia. The PSC and Larrosa recovered the city in 2023.
