= Àngel Ros =

Spanish politician and statesman

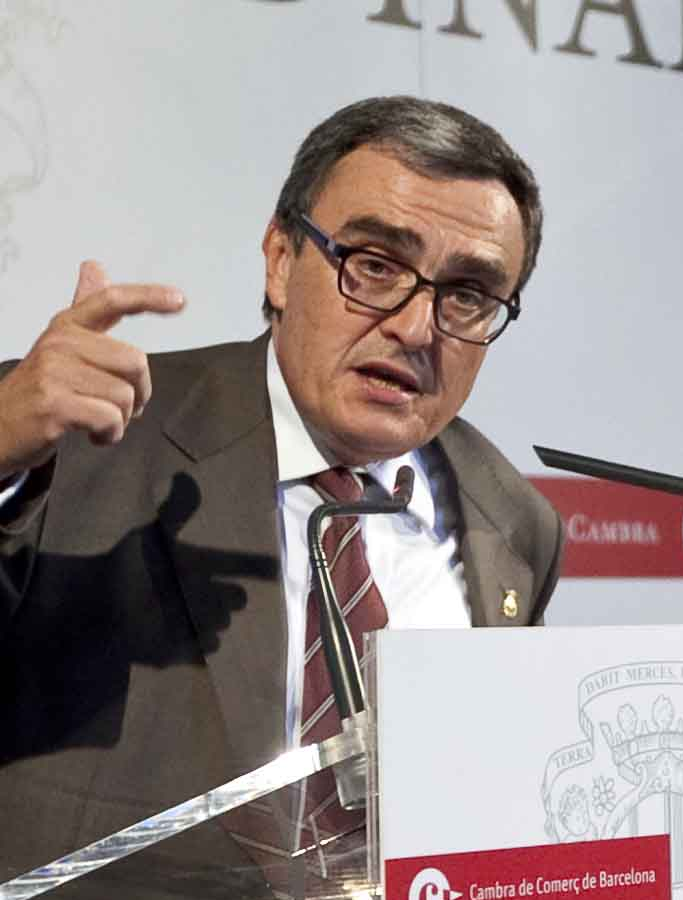

Mayor of Lleida
- In office 8 January 2004 – 4 August 2018
- Preceded by: Antoni Siurana
- Succeeded by: Fèlix Larrosa

Personal details
- Born: Àngel Ros i Domingo; 9 August 1952 (age 74) Lleida, Spain
- Party: Socialists' Party of Catalonia
- Education: University of Barcelona

Àngel Ros Domingo (born 1952, Lleida) is a Spanish politician and statesman. He was Mayor of Lleida from 2004 to 2018.

A member of the Socialists' Party of Catalonia, he was its president from 2014 to 2019.

In August 2018, foreign minister Josep Borrell designated him as Ambassador of Spain to Andorra. In August 2022, at the age of 70, he formally requested to be replaced so that he could retire, which was granted to him in February 2023.
