= Carme Laura Gil =

Spanish professor and politician

The Honourable Carme Laura Gil
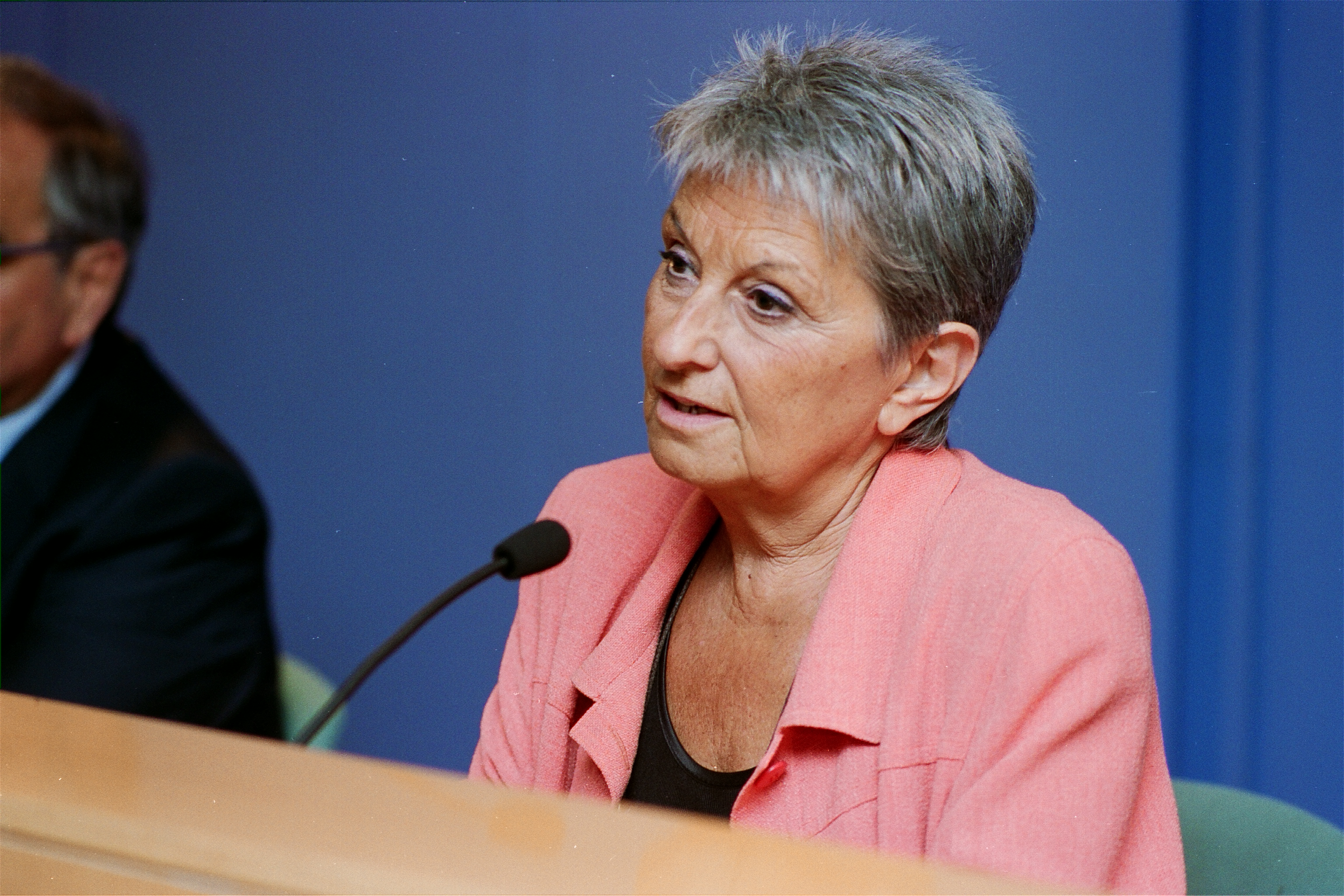
- Gil in 2001

Minister of Education of the Generalitat de Catalunya
- In office 29 November 1999 – 17 December 2003
- President: Jordi Pujol
- First Minister: Vacant (1999–2001); Artur Mas (2001–2003)
- Preceded by: Xavier Hernández Moreno
- Succeeded by: Josep Bargalló

Personal details
- Born: 1935 (age 90–91) Benissanet (Tarragona)
- Party: CiU (CDC)

Carme Laura Gil i Miró (born 1935 in Benissanet, Tarragona) is a Spanish professor and politician. She was Catalonia's Minister of Education from 1999 to 2003. She has degrees in Classical Philology and Pedagogy and she is also a University professor.

During the 1981–1994 period, she served as General Director of Batxillerat, Teachers and Education Centers as well as Scholarship Planning in the government of Catalonia. Between 1994 and 1996, she set up the Museum of the History of Catalonia (Museu d'Història de Catalunya).

In 1996, she was elected as deputy in the Congress for Barcelona. She is nowadays a member of the National Board of CDC.

Preceded by Xavier Hernández Moreno	Minister of Education; 1999–2003	Succeeded by Josep Bargalló
