= List of ministers of culture of Catalonia =

Minister of Culture of Catalonia
- Conseller de Cultura de Catalunya
- Seal of the Generalitat of Catalonia

- Flag of Catalonia

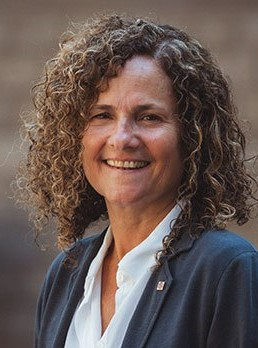
- Incumbent; Sònia Hernández Almodóvar since 12 August 2024
- Department of Culture
- Member of: Executive Council of Catalonia
- Reports to: President of Catalonia
- Seat: Barcelona
- Appointer: President of Catalonia
- Inaugural holder: Pere Pi-Sunyer i Bayo
- Formation: 5 December 1977
- Website: Department of Culture, Catalonia

This is a list of ministers of culture of Catalonia.

== List of ministers ==
Name	Portrait	Party	Took office	Left office	President	Ministerial title	Refs
Pere Pi-Sunyer i Bayo		Democratic Convergence of Catalonia	5 December 1977	8 May 1980	Josep Tarradellas	Minister of Education and Culture	
Max Cahner		Democratic Convergence of Catalonia	8 May 1980	18 June 1984	Jordi Pujol	Minister of Culture	
Joan Rigol		Democratic Union of Catalonia	18 June 1984	19 December 1985	Jordi Pujol	Minister of Culture	
Joaquim Ferrer i Roca		Democratic Convergence of Catalonia	19 December 1985	4 July 1988	Jordi Pujol	Minister of Culture	
Joan Guitart i Agell		Democratic Convergence of Catalonia	4 July 1988	7 June 1996	Jordi Pujol	Minister of Culture	
Joan Maria Pujals i Vallvé		Democratic Convergence of Catalonia	7 June 1996	29 November 1999	Jordi Pujol	Minister of Culture	
Jordi Vilajoana i Rovira		Democratic Convergence of Catalonia	29 November 1996	17 December 2003	Jordi Pujol	Minister of Culture	
Caterina Mieras		Socialists' Party of Catalonia	17 December 2003	20 April 2006	Pasqual Maragall	Minister of Culture	
Ferran Mascarell		Socialists' Party of Catalonia	20 April 2006	29 November 2006	Pasqual Maragall	Minister of Culture	
Joan Manuel Tresserras i Gaju		Independent politician (Republican Left of Catalonia)	29 November 2006	29 December 2010	José Montilla	Minister of Culture and the Media	
Ferran Mascarell		Independent	29 December 2010	14 January 2016	Artur Mas	Minister of Culture	
Santi Vila		Democratic Convergence of Catalonia	14 January 2016	5 July 2017	Carles Puigdemont	Minister of Culture	
Lluís Puig i Gordi		Catalan European Democratic Party	5 July 2017	28 October 2017	Carles Puigdemont	Minister of Culture	
Laura Borràs		Independent	2 June 2018	25 March 2019	Quim Torra	Minister of Culture	
Mariàngela Vilallonga		Independent	25 March 2019	3 September 2020	Quim Torra	Minister of Culture	
Àngels Ponsa		Together for Catalonia	3 September 2020	26 May 2021	Quim Torra	Minister of Culture	
Natàlia Garriga		Republican Left of Catalonia	26 May 2021	12 August 2024	Pere Aragonès	Minister of Culture	
Sònia Hernández Almodóvar		Independent	12 August 2024	Incumbent	Salvador Illa	Minister of Culture	
