= La Paeria =

Coordinates: 41.6147°N 0.626672°E

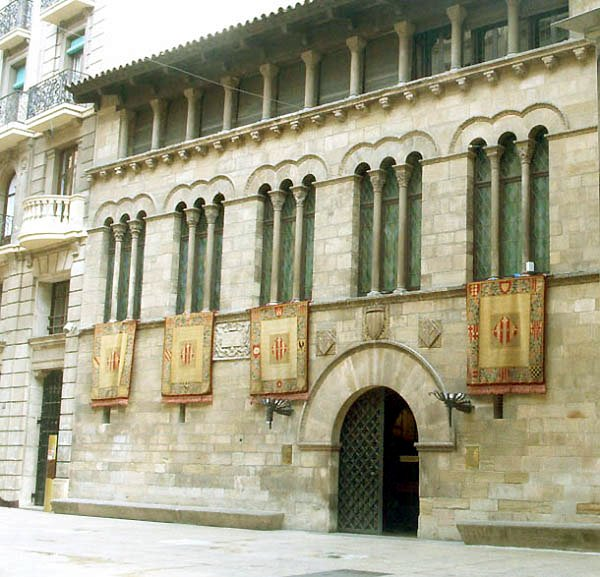
Palace of La Paeria in Lleida.

The Palace of La Paeria is the name the city hall of Lleida, Catalonia, Spain, which currently houses the city council. The see is located on Plaça de la Paeria. Lleida's mayor is called Paer en cap, a term also used for Cervera's mayor. The term paer derives from Latin paciarum, meaning "man of peace". This title was given to Lleida's mayor as a special privilege by king James I The Conqueror in 1264.

Lleida's Paeria is an example of Catalan Gothic. The façade includes all of the usual elements found in the works of this medieval architectural school

== See also ==
- List of mayors of Lleida
