= Manuel Balcells i Díaz =

Spanish politician

Manel Balcells
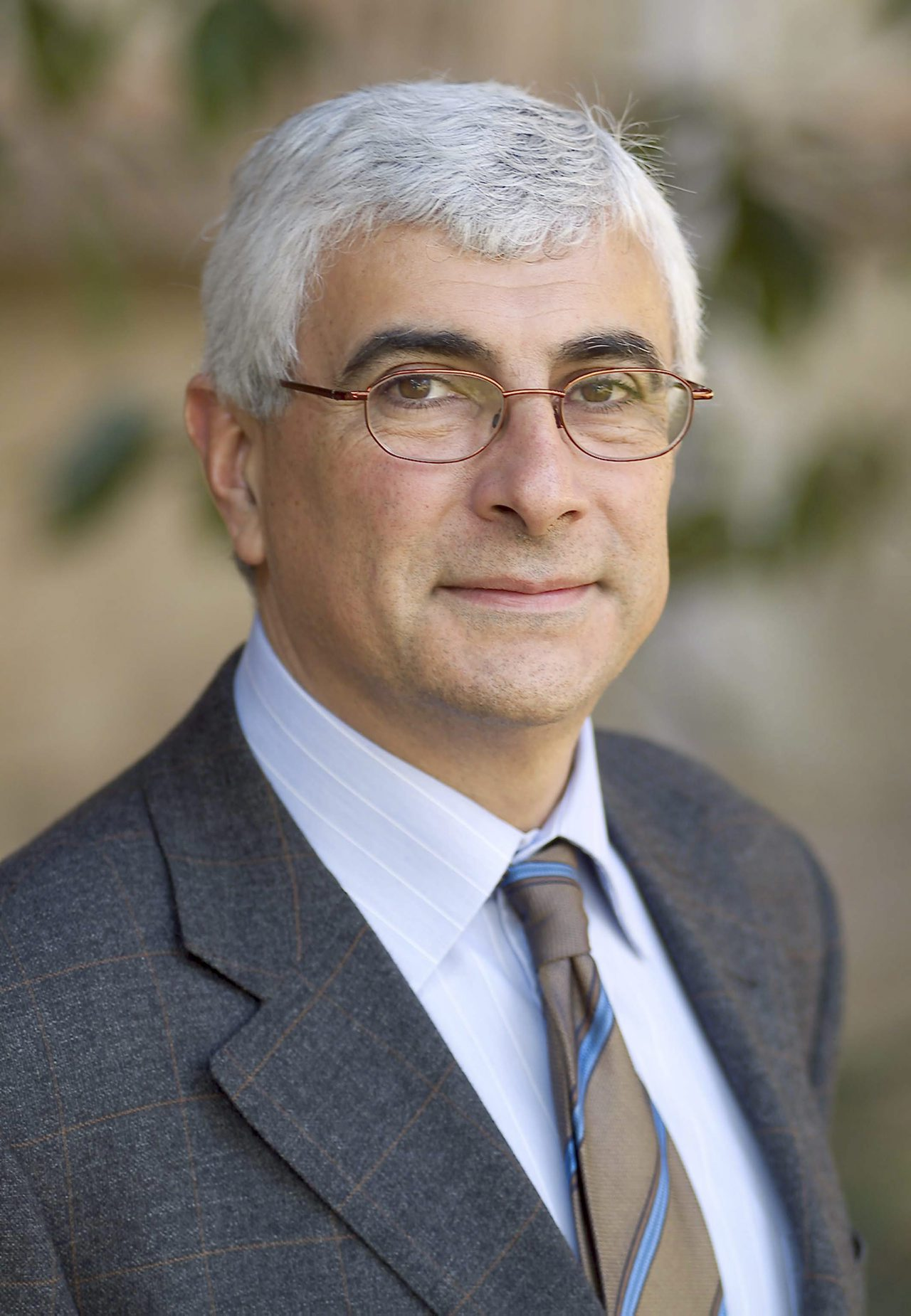

Minister of Health of Catalonia
- In office 10 October 2022 – 12 August 2024
- President: Pere Aragonès
- Preceded by: Josep Maria Argimon
- Succeeded by: Olga Pané

Minister of Universities, Research and the Information Society of Catalonia
- In office 20 April 2006 – 11 May 2006
- President: Pasqual Maragall
- Preceded by: Carles Solà

Personal details
- Born: 9 January 1958 (age 68) Ripoll (Ripollès)
- Party: ERC

Manuel Balcells i Díaz (born 9 January 1958 in Ripoll) is a Spanish politician from Catalonia.

Preceded by Carles Solà	Minister of Universities, Research and the Information Society; 2006	Succeeded by Joan Manuel del Pozo i Álvarez (as Minister of Education and Universities)
