= Carles Solà =

Spanish chemist (1945–2026)

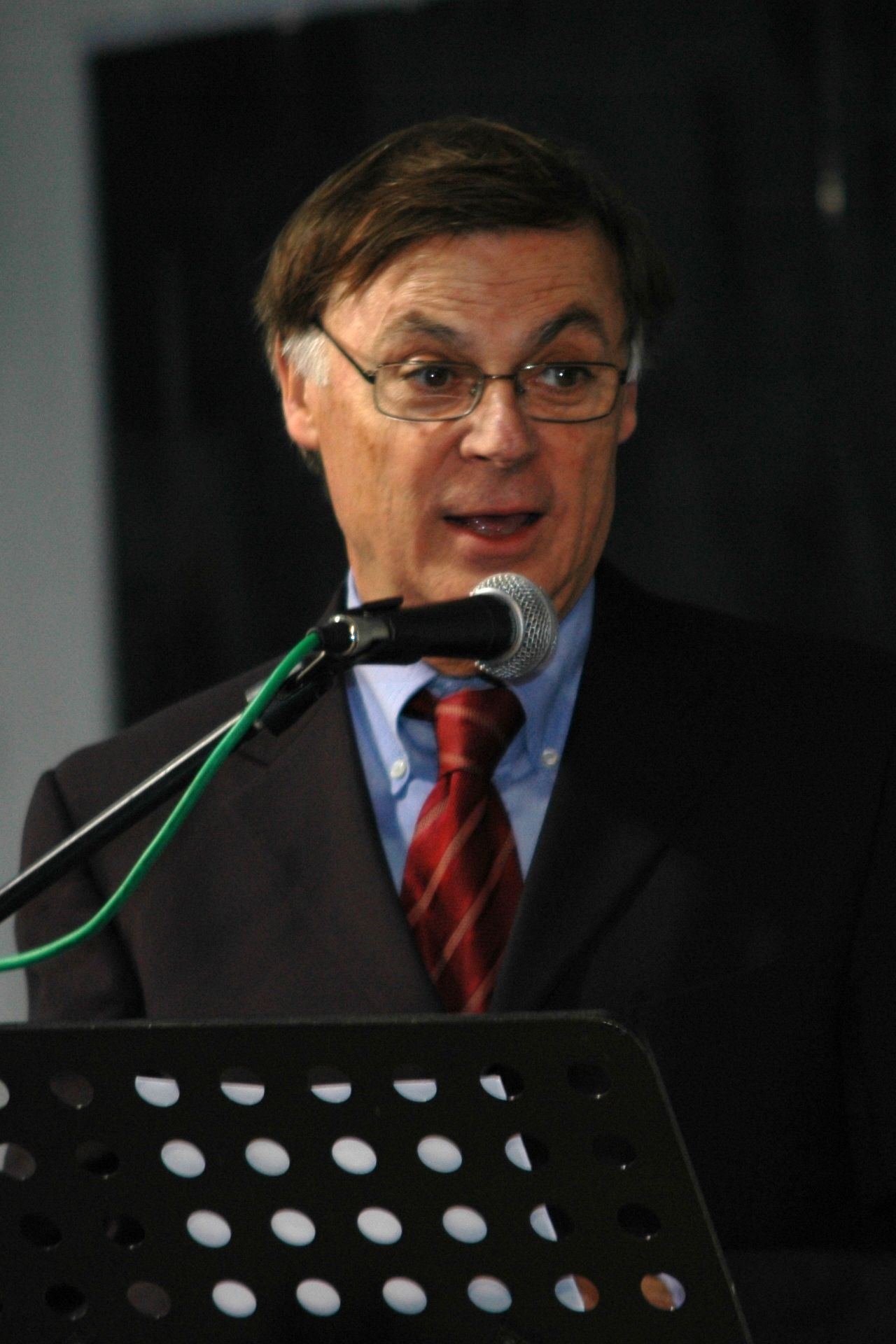
- Carles Solà at a seminar on Catalan literature at Sant Cugat in 2009

Minister of Universities, Research and the Information Society of Catalonia
- In office 17 December 2003 – 20 April 2006
- President: Pasqual Maragall
- Preceded by: Andreu Mas-Colell
- Succeeded by: Manuel Balcells i Díaz

Personal details
- Born: 1 January 1945 Xàtiva (Costera), Spain
- Died: 12 September 2026 (aged 81) Sant Cugat del Vallès, Spain
- Party: PSC

Carles Solà (1 January 1945 – 12 September 2026) was a Spanish politician.

== Life and career ==
Solà earned a PhD degree in Chemistry at the UV, he carried out research in Biochemical Engineering with 130 publications, having tutored 22 doctoral theses and directed various research projects. He was Rector of the UAB (1994–2002). He was a lecturer in Chemical Engineering at the UAB.

President of the Conference of Rectors of Spanish Universities (1996–1998). Member of the Executive Committee for the International Association of University Presidents (2000–2002). Member of the Board of the European University Association (2001–2005). Member of the Executive Committee of the Spanish Society of Biotechnology (2002–2006). Doctor Honoris Causa in Science from the University of Southampton (1999). Member of the American Institute of Chemical Engineers. Member of ACPV. Member of the IEC.

Solà died in Sant Cugat del Vallès on 12 September 2026, at the age of 81.

== Sources ==
- Martí Font, J M (19 January 2004). "Volveré a presentar a mi candidato para dirigir la Sociedad de la Información". ELPAÍS.com (in Spanish). Madrid: Ediciones El País.
- A. P. G. / M. P. (1 October 2004). "El consejero Solà pide que el Estatut incluya la potestad de Cataluña para organizar su sistema universitario". ELPAÍS.com (in Spanish). Madrid: Ediciones El País.

Preceded by Andreu Mas-Colell	Minister of Universities, Research and the Information Society; 2003–2006	Succeeded by Manuel Balcells
