= Josep Maria Rañé =

Spanish politician (born 1954)

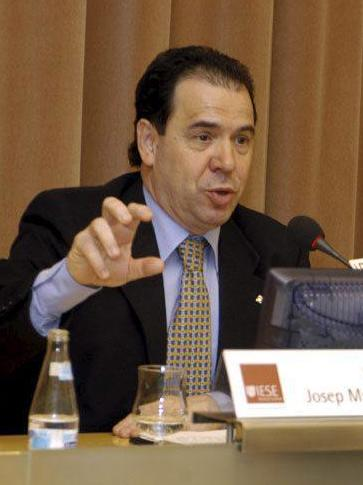
- Josep Maria Rañé (2004)

Minister of Employment and Industry of the Generalitat de Catalunya
- In office December 17, 2003 – April 20, 2006
- Preceded by: Antoni Fernández Teixidó
- Succeeded by: Jordi Valls i Riera

Personal details
- Born: June 15, 1954 (age 71) Barcelona, Catalonia, Spain
- Party: PSC

Josep Maria Rañé (born Barcelona, Spain 15 June 1954) is a Spanish politician.

== Life overview ==
He studied higher Industrial Engineering. He belongs to the Union of Consumers of Catalonia.

He is affiliated to the Unión General de Trabajadores (Unión General de Trabajadores (UGT, General Workers' Union) of Catalonia since 1976, he has been the General Secretary (1978–1979) of its Local Union of Sant Feliu de Llobregat, Secretary of union policy (1979–1981), General Secretary (1981–1990) of the Baix Llobregat, Secretary of institutional policy of the National Secretariat of the UGT of Catalonia (1990–1997) and Defender of members' rights of the UGT (1997–2001).

== Political background ==
Josep Maria Rañé has been an active member of the Socialists' Party of Catalonia-Spanish Socialist Workers' Party (PSC-PSOE) since 1984. Member of the Executive for the Baix Llobregat, he also has been responsible for the secretariat of social policy on the National Executive. Between 1983 and 1984 he became Town Councillor for Sant Just Desvern for Youth and Work. Since 1999 he is Town Councillor for Sant Feliu de Llobregat, where he is the fourth tinent d'alcalde (deputy mayor) and spokesperson for the Socialist Municipal Group.

He was a member of the executive committee of the Council of Work, of the General Council of the Catalan Health Institute (of the Catalan Health Council), of the Management Council of the Catalan Health Service, of the Plenary of the Institute of Work Studies of the Universitat de Barcelona, of the Economic and Social Council of Barcelona City Council and of the General Council of the National Institute of Social Security.

Preceded by Antoni Fernández Teixidó (as Minister of Employment, Industry, Trade and Tourism)	Minister of Employment and Industry; 2003–2006	Succeeded by Jordi Valls i Riera
