= Pere Esteve =

Spanish politician

Pere Esteve i Abad

Minister of Trade, Tourism and Consumer Affairs of Catalonia
- In office 17 December 2003 – 15 October 2004
- Preceded by: Antoni Fernández i Teixidó
- Succeeded by: Josep Huguet

Personal details
- Born: 26 December 1942 Tiana (Maresme, Barcelona Province)
- Died: 10 June 2005 (aged 62) Barcelona (Barcelonès)
- Party: CDC (1976–2002); ERC (2002–2005)

Pere Esteve i Abad (26 December 1942 – 10 June 2005) was a Catalan Spanish politician, belonging to the political organisation Catalunya 2003 (now dissolved), who became Deputy of Trade, Tourism and Consumer Affairs at the Catalan regional Government proposed by the Republican Left of Catalonia (ERC) party, with which he ran to the autonomic elections of the 2003. He resigned in October 2004 for health reasons.

== Life overview ==
Industrial Engineer by the Universitat Politècnica de Catalunya (UPC). He taught Electronics and State Machines. He also has worked as director in the private sector, and has been an associated in industrial corporations and consulting services companies. He has written several papers and a book, named Estratègia per Catalunya.

== Civic background ==
Between 1965 and 1968 he made up youth people associations as well as Christian movements. In 1974 he roled in the pre-political group Amics de Tiana (Friends of Tiana), where he left the following year.

He has been the President of the Associació d’Enginyers Industrial de Catalunya (Industrial Engineers Association of Catalonia), and founded and chaired ICT and ICICT.

== Political background ==
He enrolled in Convergència Democràtica de Catalunya in 1976. He was town councillor in Tiana, CDC's National Consultant as well as Spokesperson and General Secretary of CDC (from 1996 to 2000). He also chaired the Fundació Ramon Trias Fargas (Ramon Trias Fargas Foundation). On 25 September 2002 he resigned all his offices and left CDC.

On 27 November 2003 he joined others to found the Associació Catalunya 2003 (Catalonia 2003 Association) and joined ERC.

== Institutional background ==
His most relevant charges are:

- Town councillor in Tiana (1979–1985) by Convergence and Union (CiU).
- Deputy at the Catalan Parliament, and President of its Trade commission (1992–1995) by CiU.
- Deputy at the European Parliament (1999–2002) by CiU.
- He was elected deputy at the Catalan Parliament by the Republican Left of Catalonia (ERC) party in the 2003 elections, he resigned to become Minister of the Catalan regional Government.

Political offices
Preceded by Antoni Fernández Teixidó; As Minister of Employment, Industry, Trade and Tourism	Minister of Trade, Tourism and Consumer Affairs of the Generalitat de Catalunya; 2003 – 2004	Succeeded by Josep Huguet
Party political offices
Preceded by Miquel Roca i Junyent	General Secretary of CDC; 1996 – 2000	Succeeded by Artur Mas
