= Joan Carretero =

Spanish physician and politician

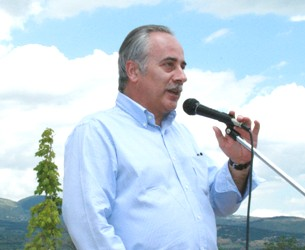

Counsellor of Governance and Public Administration of the Generalitat de Catalunya
- In office 17 December 2003 – 20 April 2006
- President: Pasqual Maragall
- Preceded by: Josep Maria Pelegrí i Aixut
- Succeeded by: Xavier Vendrell

Mayor of Puigcerdà
- In office 17 June 1995 – 23 December 2003

Personal details
- Born: 19 December 1955 (age 70) Tremp (Pallars Jussà, Catalonia)
- Party: ERC (1990–2009); Reagrupament (from 2009)

Joan Carretero i Grau (Catalan pronunciation: [ʒuˈaŋ kərəˈteɾu]; born 1955 in Tremp, Pallars Jussà) is a Spanish physician and politician. After having been mayor of Puigcerdà, he became a counsellor in the Catalan Government.

== Education and Professional background ==
Joan Carretero received his degree in Medicine and Surgery in 1978 from the UB. He also has a diploma in Health from the Escola Nacional de Salut in Lleida and a master's degree in Public Health from the University of Barcelona. He has worked as doctor in Barbens (Pla d'Urgell), and currently works in Puigcerdà.

== Civic background ==
He has been a member of the Association of Parents of Students of Vedruna School in Puigcerdà and president of Club de Futbol Puigcerdà (Puigcerdà Football Club). Joan Carretero is associated with FC Barcelona.

== Political background ==
Joan Carretero joined the ERC in 1990. He was expelled from the ERC on 27 April 2009 because of his vocal criticism regarding the direction of the party. On 3 October 2009 he created a new Catalan independentist political party, Reagrupament, but it couldn't get representation in the Catalan parliament.

== Institutional background ==
He became mayor of Puigcerdà in 1995, when he ran the first time, leading ERC's lists. He resigned in December 2003 when he became a minister in the Catalan Government, but he was displaced in April 2006.

Political offices
Preceded by Josep Maria Pelegrí i Aixut; Counsellor of Governance and Institutional Relations	Counsellor of Governance and Public Administration; 2003 – 2006	Succeeded by Xavier Vendrell
Preceded by ?	Mayor of Puigcerdà; 1995 – 2003	Succeeded by Joan Planella i Casanyas
Party political offices
Preceded by Party created	President of Reagrupament; 2009 – present	Succeeded by Incumbent
