= Josep Bargalló =

Catalan teacher and politician

The Honourable Josep Bargalló
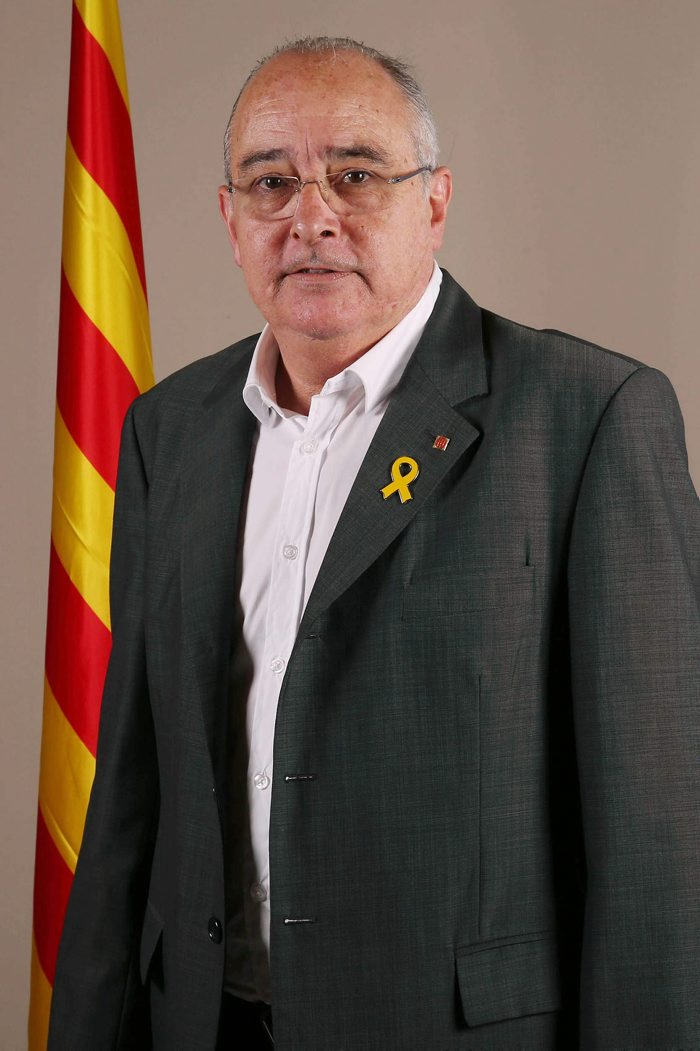
- Bargalló in June 2018

Minister of Education of Catalonia
- In office 2 June 2018 – 24 May 2021
- President: Quim Torra
- Preceded by: Clara Ponsatí (Direct rule until 2 June 2018)
- Succeeded by: Josep Gonzàlez Cambray
- In office 20 December 2003 – 20 February 2004
- President: Pasqual Maragall
- Preceded by: Carme Laura Gil
- Succeeded by: Marta Cid

First Minister of Catalonia (Note: Chief Advisor from 20 February 2004 to 17 March 2005)
- In office 20 February 2004 – 11 May 2006
- President: Pasqual Maragall
- Preceded by: Josep-Lluís Carod-Rovira
- Succeeded by: Josep-Lluís Carod-Rovira

Member of the Catalan Parliament for the Province of Tarragona
- In office 3 April 1992 – 23 September 2003
- In office 17 November 2006 – 3 January 2007
- Succeeded by: Sergi de los Ríos i Martínez

Member of Torredembarra Municipal Council
- In office 1995–2003

Personal details
- Born: Josep Bargalló i Valls; 3 October 1958 (age 67) Torredembarra, Catalonia, Spain
- Citizenship: Spanish
- Party: Republican Left of Catalonia
- Other political affiliations: Republican Left of Catalonia–Catalonia Yes
- Education: University of Barcelona; Rovira i Virgili University
- Occupation: Teacher

Josep Bargalló i Valls (born 3 October 1958) is a Spanish teacher and politician from Catalonia and the current Minister of Education of Catalonia.

Born in 1958 in Torredembarra, Bargalló studied philology at the University of Barcelona before becoming a teacher. He was a member of the municipal council in Torredembarra from 1995 to 2003. He was a member of the Parliament of Catalonia from April 1992 to September 2003 when he retired from politics. However, in December 2003 he was appointed Minister of Education of Catalonia and in February 2004 he was promoted to Chief Advisor/First Minister of Catalonia. Bargalló and other Republican Left of Catalonia ministers were sacked from the Catalan government in May 2006.

Bargalló was re-elected to the Parliament of Catalonia in December 2006 but resigned in January 2007 after being appointed director of the Institut Ramon Llull, a position he held until December 2010. He was also director of the Fundació Ramon Llull from 2008 to 2010. Bargalló returned to politics in June 2018 when he was appointed Minister of Education of Catalonia for a second time.

== Early life ==
Bargalló was born on 3 October 1958 in Torredembarra, Catalonia. He has degree in Catalan philology from the University of Barcelona (UB) in Tarragona and a master's degree in advanced studies of Catalan language, literature and culture from the Rovira i Virgili University (URV).

== Career ==
Bargalló started working as a teacher in 1981 and was headteacher of Pons d’Icart Secondary School in Tarragona from 1985 to 1987. He has been a member of the Unió dels Treballadors d'Ensenyament de Catalunya (USTEC·STEs), a teachers' union, since 1980. Bargalló has also taught several post-graduate courses. Since 2011 he has been vice-president of the Josep Irla Foundation graduate course in Catalan philology at UB and co-ordinator of the Institute of Educational Sciences at URV.

Bargalló is a member of the Societat Catalana de Llengua i Literatura, part of the Institut d'Estudis Catalans. He has worked in the publishing sector, as a literary director for several collections and publishing houses. He was co-ordinator of the Capitell de Columna edicions collection between 1988 and 1991 and literary director of Edicions El Mèdol from 1989 to 1998. He has written several books and essays on history and literature as well as film scripts. He has also been a literature critic for newspapers and specialist magazines. Bargalló is a member of the Colla Castellera Nois de la Torre, Ball de Diables de Torredembarra and the group of carriers of the Virgen de Torredembarra dragon.

Bargalló was director of the Institut Ramon Llull from December 2006 to December 2010 and director of the Fundació Ramon Llull from 2008 to 2010.

=== Politics ===
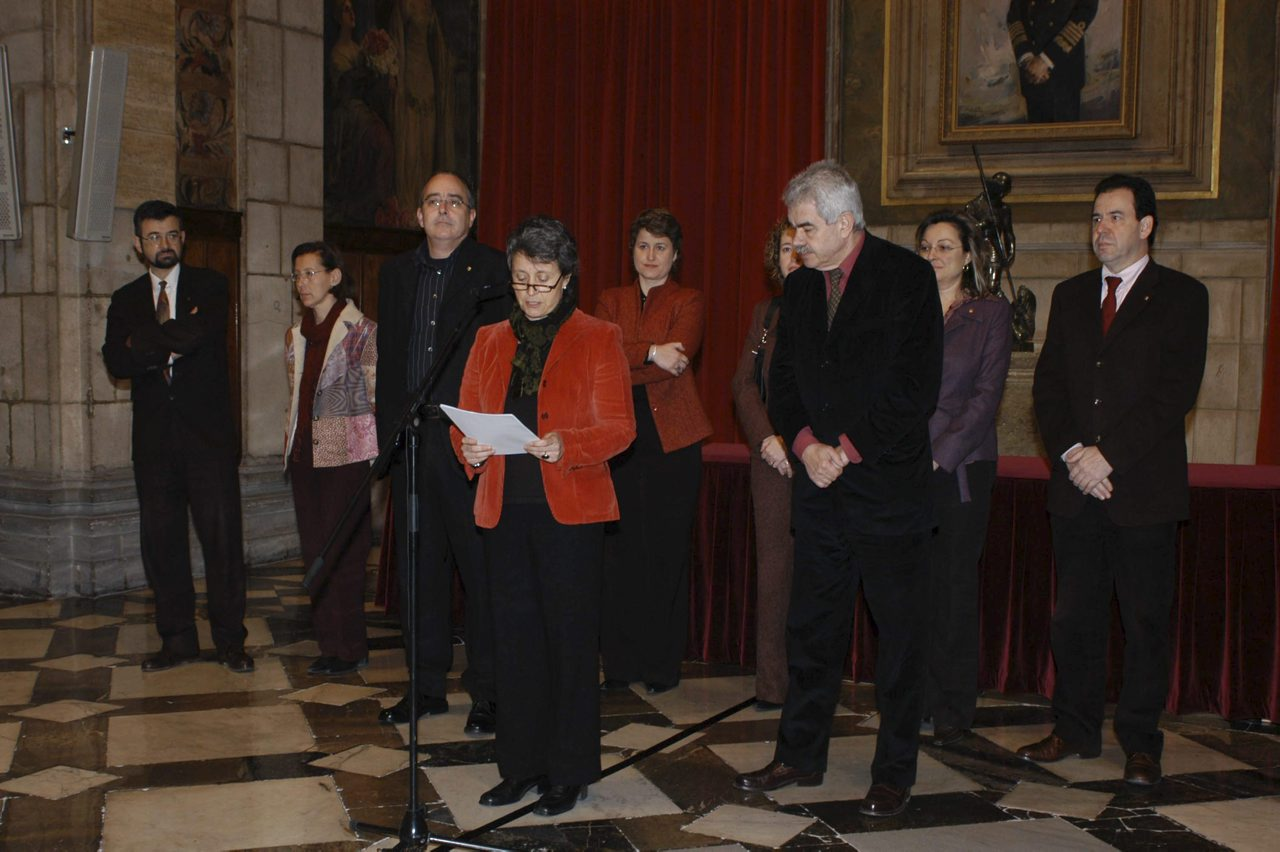
Bargalló at a reception to celebrate International Women's Day in March 2004

Bargalló's political life began in the Assemblea de Catalunya, which he founded, in Torredembarra. Over the years he has also been a member of the Unified Socialist Party of Catalonia (PSUC), Socialist Party of National Liberation (PSAN) and Left Nationalists (NE).

Bargalló contested the 1992 regional election as an independent Republican Left of Catalonia (ERC) candidate in the Province of Tarragona and was elected to the Parliament of Catalonia. He joined ERC in 1995. He was re-elected at the 1995 and 1999 regional elections.

Bargalló contested the 1995 local elections as an ERC candidate in Torredembarra and was elected. He was re-elected at the 1999 and 2003 local elections. He was deputy mayor of Torredembarra from 1999 and 2003.

Bargalló chose to retire from politics in 2003 and at the 2003 regional election he was placed 18th on ERC's list of candidates in the Province of Tarragona but as the party only managed to win three seats in the province he was not re-elected. However, after the election leftist parties formed a government led by Pasqual Maragall and in December 2003 Bargalló was appointed Minister of Education. He was appointed Chief Advisor (re-designated First Minister in March 2005) in February 2014 following the resignation of Josep-Lluís Carod-Rovira. Bargalló and other ERC ministers were sacked from the government in May 2006 as a result the ERC's refusal to support the 2006 Statute of Autonomy of Catalonia.

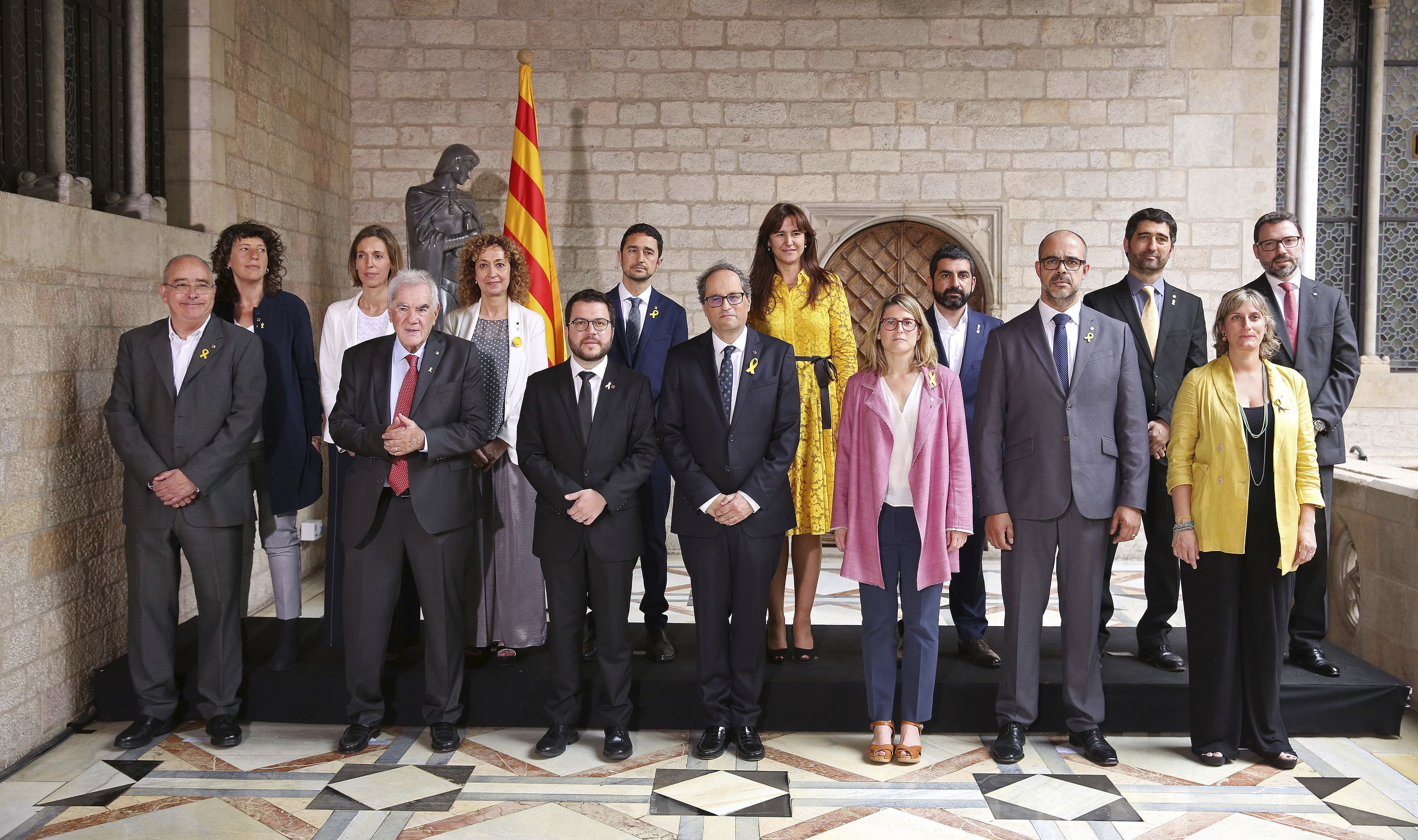
Bargalló and other members of the Catalan government on 2 June 2018

Bargalló contested the 2006 regional election as an ERC candidate in the Province of Tarragona and was re-elected. He resigned from parliament on 3 January 2007 after being appointed director of the Institut Ramon Llull.

On 19 May 2018 newly elected President of Catalonia Quim Torra nominated a new government in which Bargalló was to be Minister of Education. He was sworn in on 2 June 2018 at the Palau de la Generalitat de Catalunya.

== Published works ==
- Literatura Catalana del Segle XVI al XVIII (1987, Teide; ISBN 8430784012, 9788430784011)
- Un Segle de Castells: de 1900 a 2000 en Dades (2001, Cossetània Edicions; ISBN 849568425X, 9788495684257)
- Manual de Mètrica i Versificació Catalanes (2007, Editorial Empúries; ISBN 8497872274, 9788497872270)
- Què és la Mètrica: Introducció a la Versificació Catalana (2007, Edicions; ISBN 8429759891, 9788429759891)
- Les Set Vides de Pere Romeu: Indians, Modernistes i Sportsmen (2016, A Contra Vent; ISBN 841572019X, 9788415720195)

== Electoral history ==
Electoral history of Josep Bargalló
Election	Constituency	Party	Alliance	No.	Result
1992 regional	Province of Tarragona	Independent	Republican Left of Catalonia	2	Elected
1995 local	Torredembarra	Republican Left of Catalonia			Elected
1995 regional	Province of Tarragona	Republican Left of Catalonia		2	Elected
1999 local	Torredembarra	Republican Left of Catalonia	Republican Left of Catalonia-Els Verds-Acord Municipal		Elected
1999 regional	Province of Tarragona	Republican Left of Catalonia		2	Elected
2003 local	Torredembarra	Republican Left of Catalonia	Republican Left of Catalonia-Acord Municipal	1	Elected
2003 regional	Province of Tarragona	Republican Left of Catalonia		18	Not elected
2006 regional	Province of Tarragona	Republican Left of Catalonia		2	Elected
