= Caterina Mieras =

Spanish politician and teacher

Caterina Mieras i Barceló
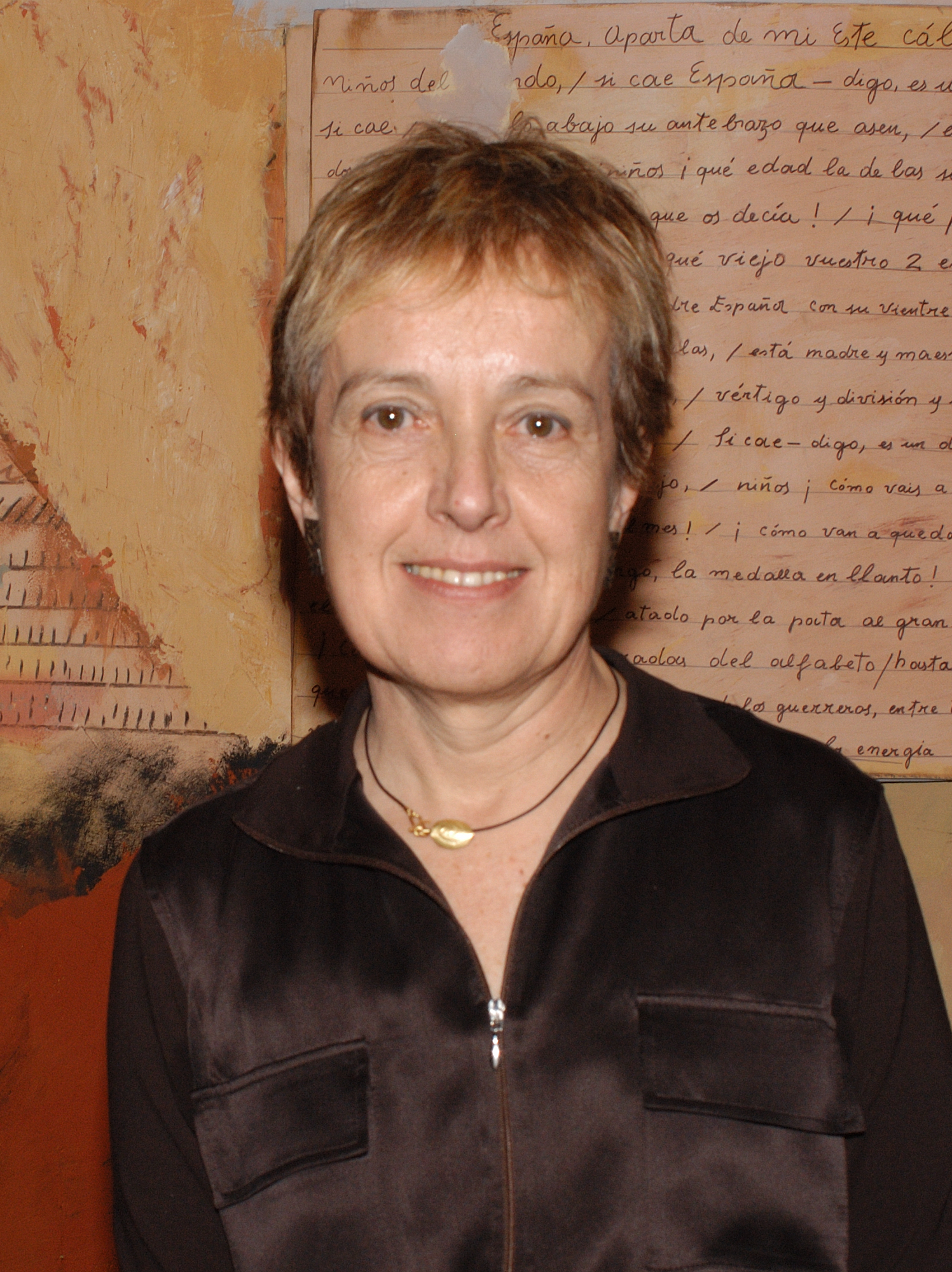
- Mieras in 2004

Minister of Culture of the Generalitat de Catalunya
- In office 17 December 2003 – 20 April 2006
- President: Pasqual Maragall
- Preceded by: Jordi Vilajoana i Rovira
- Succeeded by: Ferran Mascarell i Canalda

Personal details
- Born: 5 April 1947 (age 79) Sant Joan, Mallorca, Spain
- Party: PSC

Caterina Mieras i Barceló (born 5 April 1947) is a Spanish politician. She is also a teacher at the Teacher Training School of the Balearic Islands and reached an Upper Grade in piano from the Conservatory of Music of Valencia.

== Life ==
Mieras was born on 5 April 1947 in Sant Joan, Mallorca. She holds a degree in Medicine and Surgery from the University of Barcelona. She was one of the founders of the Democratic Students Union at the UB in 1967. Since 1980, she has been an active member of PSC.

Mieras has been teacher as part of the Dermatology services of the Hospital Clínic of Barcelona (1974–1977) and of the Vall d'Hebron Residence (1978–1991).

Lecturer in Dermatology at the Faculty of Medicine of the UAB (1979–1991) and at the University School of Nursing of the Vall d'Hebron Residence (1979–1991).

She has been awarded by The Federation of Progressive Women with the Progressive Woman prize in 1994 for her scientific and social work in the field of AIDS.

She also was town Councillor for Badalona from 1995 to 2003, where she got the responsibility over several areas.

Preceded by Jordi Vilajoana i Rovira	Minister of Culture; 2003–2006	Succeeded by Ferran Mascarell i Canalda
