= Marina Geli =

Spanish politician (born 1958)

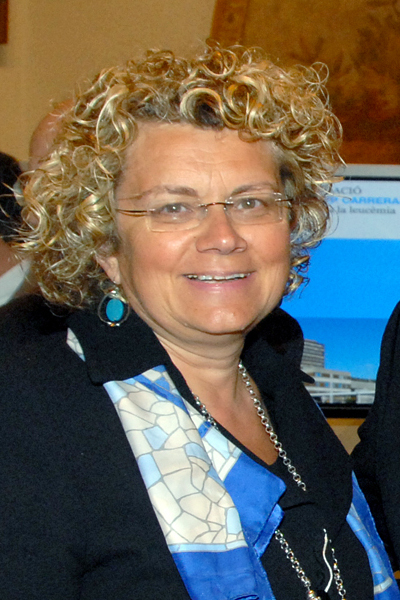
- Geli in 2010

Minister of Health of the Generalitat de Catalunya
- In office 17 December 2003 – 29 December 2010
- President: Pasqual Maragall; José Montilla
- Preceded by: Xavier Pomés i Abella
- Succeeded by: Boi Ruiz i Garcia

Personal details
- Born: 12 September 1958 (age 67) Sant Gregori, Gironès, Catalonia, Spain
- Party: PSC

Marina Geli i Fàbrega (born 12 September 1958, Sant Gregori) is a Spanish medical professional. She was the health minister of the Generalitat de Catalunya from 2003 to 2010. She is considered one of the most prominent members of the Catalanist wing of the Socialists' Party of Catalonia.

Geli obtained her medical degree from the University of Barcelona. She was an intern at the Hospital Josep Trueta in Girona from 1981 to 1990. She became a specialist in the treatment of infectious diseases and AIDS. She was also involved in several associations related to the fight against AIDS.

She also was town councillor for Sant Gregori (1982–1990) and county councillor for Girona, during the same period.

She is president of the Committee for Social Policy in the period 1996-1999 in the Catalan Parliament and Spokesperson for Social Policy in the sixth legislature.

She became policy manager and First Secretary of the PSC for the region of Girona in 2000.

== Private life ==
Ms. Geli is married with two children.

Political offices
Preceded by Xavier Pomés i Abella	Minister of Health; 2003 – 2010	Succeeded by Boi Ruiz i Garcia
