= Marta Cid =

Catalan government minister

Marta Cid i Pañella
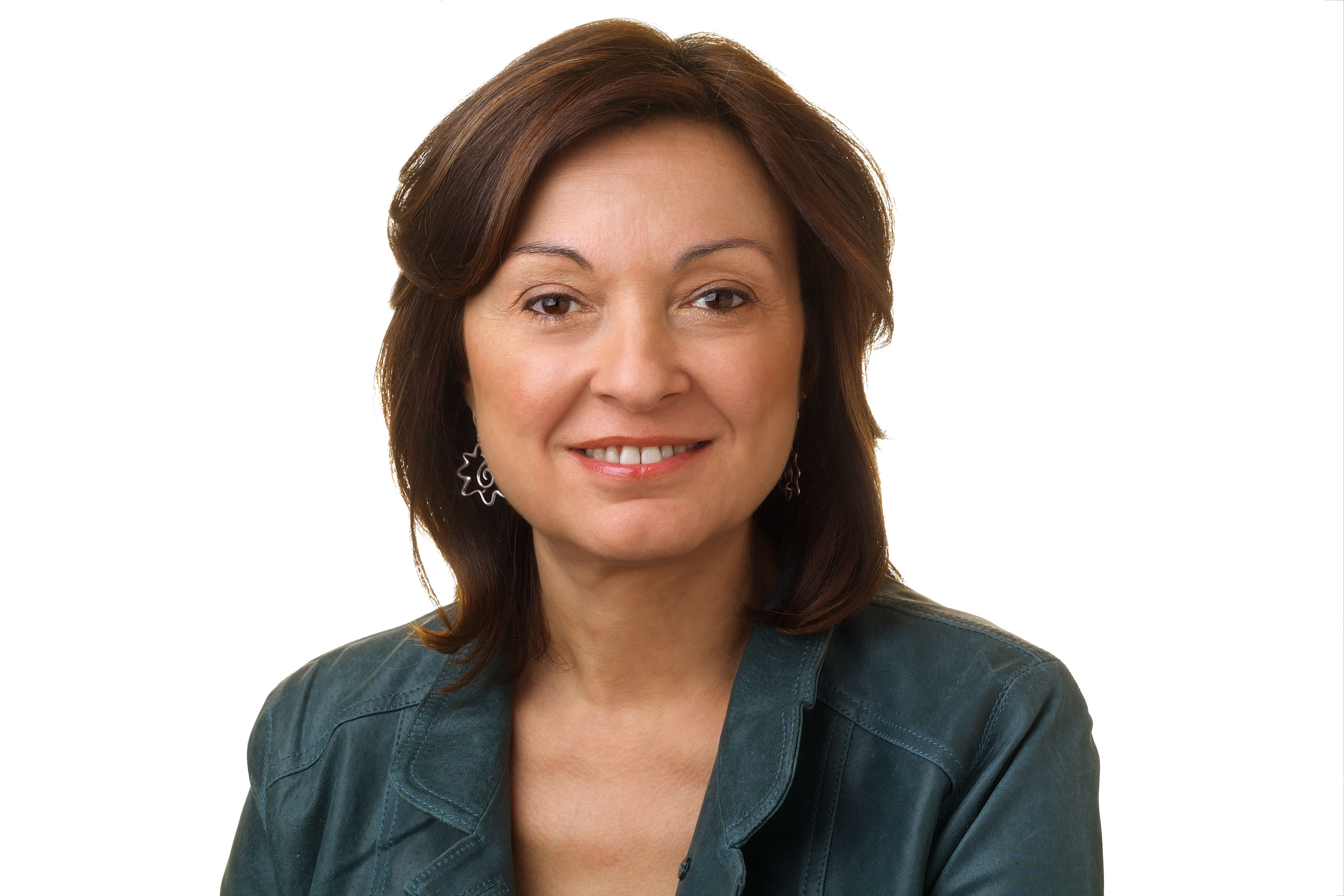

Minister of Education of the Generalitat de Catalunya
- In office 20 February 2004 – 11 May 2006
- President: Pasqual Maragall
- First Minister: Josep Bargalló i Valls
- Preceded by: Josep Bargalló i Valls
- Succeeded by: Joan Manuel del Pozo i Álvarez

Personal details
- Born: 29 July 1960 (age 65) Amposta (Montsià)
- Party: ERC

Marta Cid i Pañella (born 29 July 1960) is a former Minister of Education of Catalonia from 20 February 2004 until 12 May 2006.

== Education and professional background ==
Marta Cid i Pañella received a Bachelor's degree in Psychology, a Graduation in Teaching and a Postdegree in Speech therapy from the UB. She taught basic education between 1982 and 1987, and worked as a speech therapist in the Special Educational School and Occupational Factory (APASA) between 1987 and 2000.

== Civic background ==
She founded the Amposta Handball Club, a sport she played until 1984. She also cofounded the Against Transfer Coordinator, and has collaborated with several organizations and cultural associations of Amposta.

She cowrote PHN: la raó d’Estat contra l’Ebre i la Terra (PHN: State reason against the Ebre and the Land) in 2003.

== Political background ==
Marta Cid enrolled in ERC in 1978, where she held several charges. She chaired the Amposta-located section, the Montsià Local Federation and the Terres de l'Ebre division.

She has been head of the Tarragona electoral list for the Spanish Congress twice, and member of the list for the Catalan Parliament in 1995. She also chaired the ERC's National Council.

== Institutional background ==
She has been Councillor in Amposta Town Council (1993 to March 2004), Regional Councillor in Montsià (1997–2001) and First Vicepresident of the Montsià Local Federation (1999–2001).

In 2000, she was elected in Tarragona for a seat in the Spanish Senate by the ERC party, integrated in the Entesa Catalana de Progrés (Catalan Agreement of Progress). She resigned in November 2003 because she was elected as a deputy in the Catalan Parliament elections. After she was elected Minister of Education of the Generalitat de Catalunya (substituting Josep Bargalló i Valls), February 2004, she resigned as deputy in April 2004.

Preceded by Josep Bargalló i Valls	Minister of Education; 2004–2006	Succeeded by Joan Manuel del Pozo i Álvarez (as Minister of Education and Universities)
