= Mariàngela Vilallonga =

Spanish politician and professor

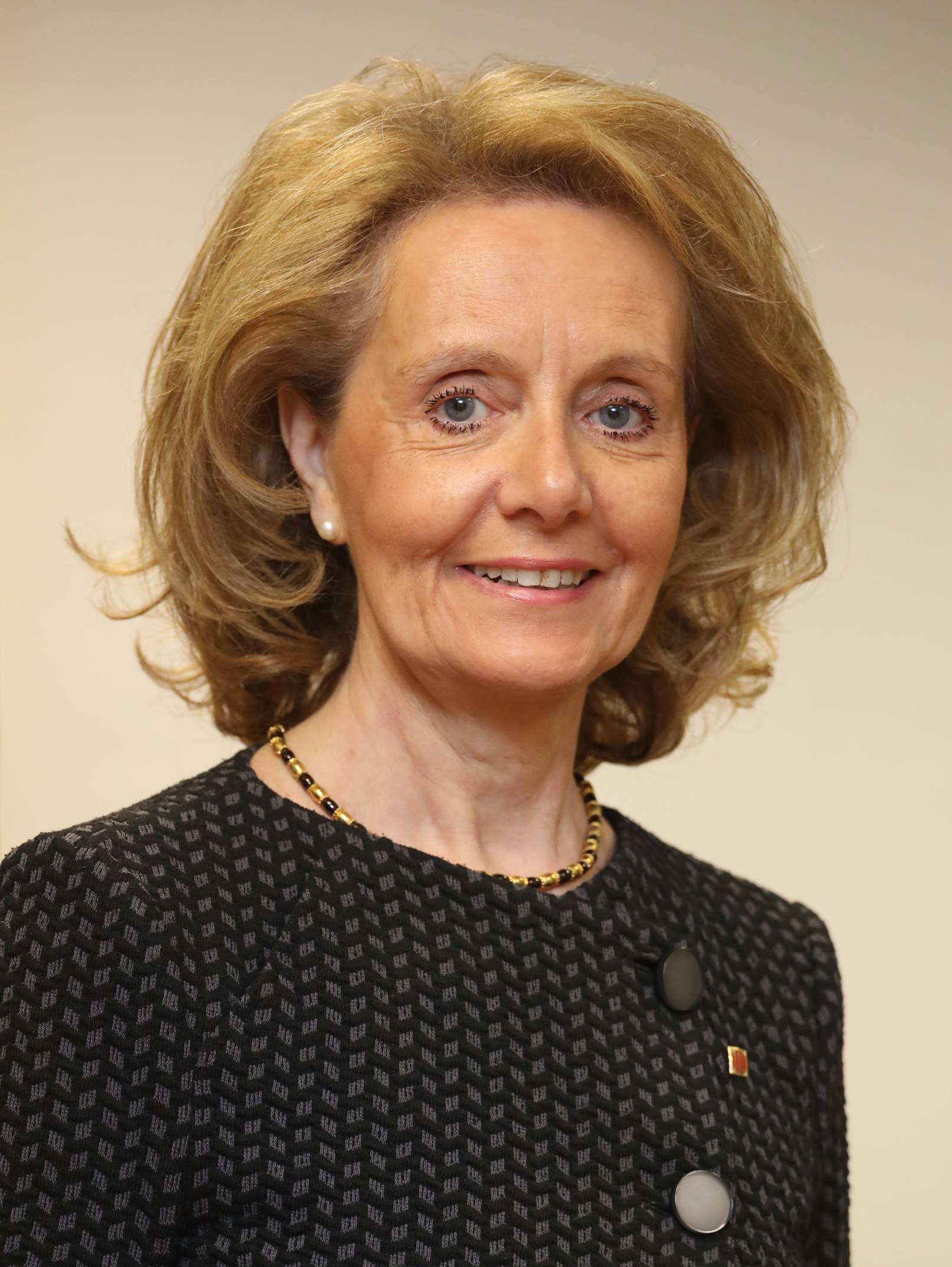
Official portrait 2019

Mariàngela Vilallonga Vives (born 3 April 1952) is a Spanish Catalan philologist and academic, professor of Latin philology at the University of Girona between 1977 and 2022. Between 2017 and 2019 she was second vice-president of the Institute of Catalan Studies, an institution where she held several senior positions. On 25 March 2019 she became the minister of culture in the Quim Torra Government of the Generalitat de Catalunya. Her term as minister of culture ended on 3 September 2020.

== Early life and education ==
Her father was the tailor Josep Vilallonga. Born in Girona, she grew up in Llagostera. She studied primary school in the Carmelites of the municipality and the elementary baccalaureate at the Institut de Girona. Later she studied at the Institut Jaume Vicens Vives in Girona. She began a degree in Philosophy and Literature at the University of Girona, and graduated in Classical Philology at the Autonomous University of Barcelona. In September 1974 she defended her dissertation, La estructura omfàlica a l'epístola Ad Pisones d'Horaci, directed by Àngel Anglada Anfruns. In the same year she began to work as a teacher at the University College of Girona and married in 1975.

== University ==
With a PhD in classical philology from the Autonomous University of Barcelona, she is professor of Latin philology at the University of Girona and director of the Maria Àngels Anglada – Carles Fages de Climent Chair of Literary Heritage, since its creation in 2004, and of the Literary Heritage Research Group. She has directed research projects on the relations between the humanists of the Crown of Aragon and Europe during the 15th and 16th centuries. In this field, the book La literatura latina en Cataluña en el siglo XV and his contributions on the cardinal and bishop of Gerona Joan Margarit y Pau and Jeroni Pau, of whom she is a specialist, are particularly noteworthy.

She coordinated the Studia Humanitatis working group, in which fourteen researchers from Germany, Italy, the United Kingdom, Belgium and Spain participate. He has created a virtual library where biographies of the main Catalan humanists and some of their Latin texts can be found.

== Academy ==
Since 28 February 2005 she has been a numerary member of the Institute of Catalan Studies with the number 255, and since 2017 she has been the institution's vice-president. She had already been previously, between 11 November 2010 and 2013, replacing Joan Solà, who died on 27 October 2010.

She has been a member of the Governing Board and the Advisory Council of the Institució de les Lettres Catalanes since 2015. She has been a member of the Arts and Culture Council of Girona (2008–2011), member of the School Council of Catalonia (2011–2015), member of the Social Council of Culture of the Government of Catalonia (2014–2015), president of the Advisory Council of the CRUSCAT Network (2010–2015), member of the Organising Committee of the Commemorations of the Government of Catalonia (2011–2013) and coordinator of the "Leaves" of the Journal of Girona (1985–2008).

== Politics ==
On 22 March 2019 she was announced as the future Minister of Culture in Quim Torra's government, replacing Laura Borràs. Borràs left the post to run as an independent candidate in the Spanish general elections in April 2019. In 2020 some controversy was caused in reference to her opinion concerning excessive use of Spanish on TV3, making particular reference to a new bilingual series, Drama. In September of the same year she was relieved of her post.

== Publications ==
She is the author of more than a dozen monographs and books. She has also translated Rainer M. Rilke's French Poems (2011). She has collaborated with several media (El Punt, Presencia, Revista de Girona, Sierra d'Or, La Vanguardia, Avui, Ara).

- Vida i obra de Jeroni Pau (Resum de Tesi Doctoral) (1984)
- Jeroni Pau. Obres (dos volums, 1986, ISBN 978-84-7256-282-0)
- Els arbres (1986)
- Dos opuscles de Pere Miquel Carbonell (1988)
- Llengua i literatura de l'Edat Mitjana al Renaixement (1991) amb Albert Rossich
- La literatura llatina a Catalunya al segle XV. Repertori bio-bibliogràfic (1993, ISBN 978-84-7256-930-0)
- El Renaixement i l'Humanisme (2002, ISBN 978-84-8429-885-4)
- Atles literari de les terres de Girona (segles XIX i XX) (2003) amb Narcís-Jordi Aragó
- Johannes Burckard. Dietari secret (2003)
- Recrear Rodoreda Romanyà (2008)

== Awards and recognitions ==
On 26 April 2016, she received the Cross of Sant Jordi for her "research focused on the Latin humanistic literature of the Crown of Aragon".
