= Carme Figueras =

Spanish politician

Carme Figueres i Siñol

Minister of Social Welfare and Family Affairs of the Generalitat de Catalunya (2006)

Personal details
- Born: Tuesday, July 12, 1955 Molins de Rei (Baix Llobregat), Catalonia, Spain
- Party: PSC
- Spouse: José Zaragoza

Carme Figueras i Siñol (Molins de Rei - July 12, 1955) is a Spanish politician who was Minister of Social Welfare and Family Affairs in 2006.

Preceded by Anna Simó	Minister of Social Welfare and Family Affairs; 2006	Succeeded by Carme Capdevila i Palau
