= List of ministers of employment of Catalonia =

== List of ministers ==
=== Employment (1977–2002) ===
	Name	Took office	Left office	Party
1	Joan Codina i Torres	December 5, 1977	May 8, 1980	PSC
2	Joan Rigol	May 8, 1980	June 18, 1984	UDC
3	Oriol Badia i Tobella	June 18, 1984	July 4, 1988	CDC
4	Ignasi Farreres i Bochaca	July 4, 1988	November 29, 1999	UDC
5	Lluís Franco i Sala	November 29, 1999	November 4, 2002	UDC

=== Employment, industry, trade and tourism (2002–2003) ===
	Name	Took office	Left office	Party
6	Antoni Fernández Teixidó	November 4, 2002	December 17, 2003	CDC

=== Employment and industry (2003–2006) ===
	Name	Took office	Left office	Party
7	Josep Maria Rañé	December 17, 2003	April 20, 2006	PSC
8	Jordi Valls i Riera	April 20, 2006	November 29, 2006	PSC

=== Employment (since 2006) ===
	Name	Took office	Left office	Party
9	Maria del Mar Serna i Calvo	November 29, 2006	present	Independent but in a list of PSC
