= Antoni Castells =

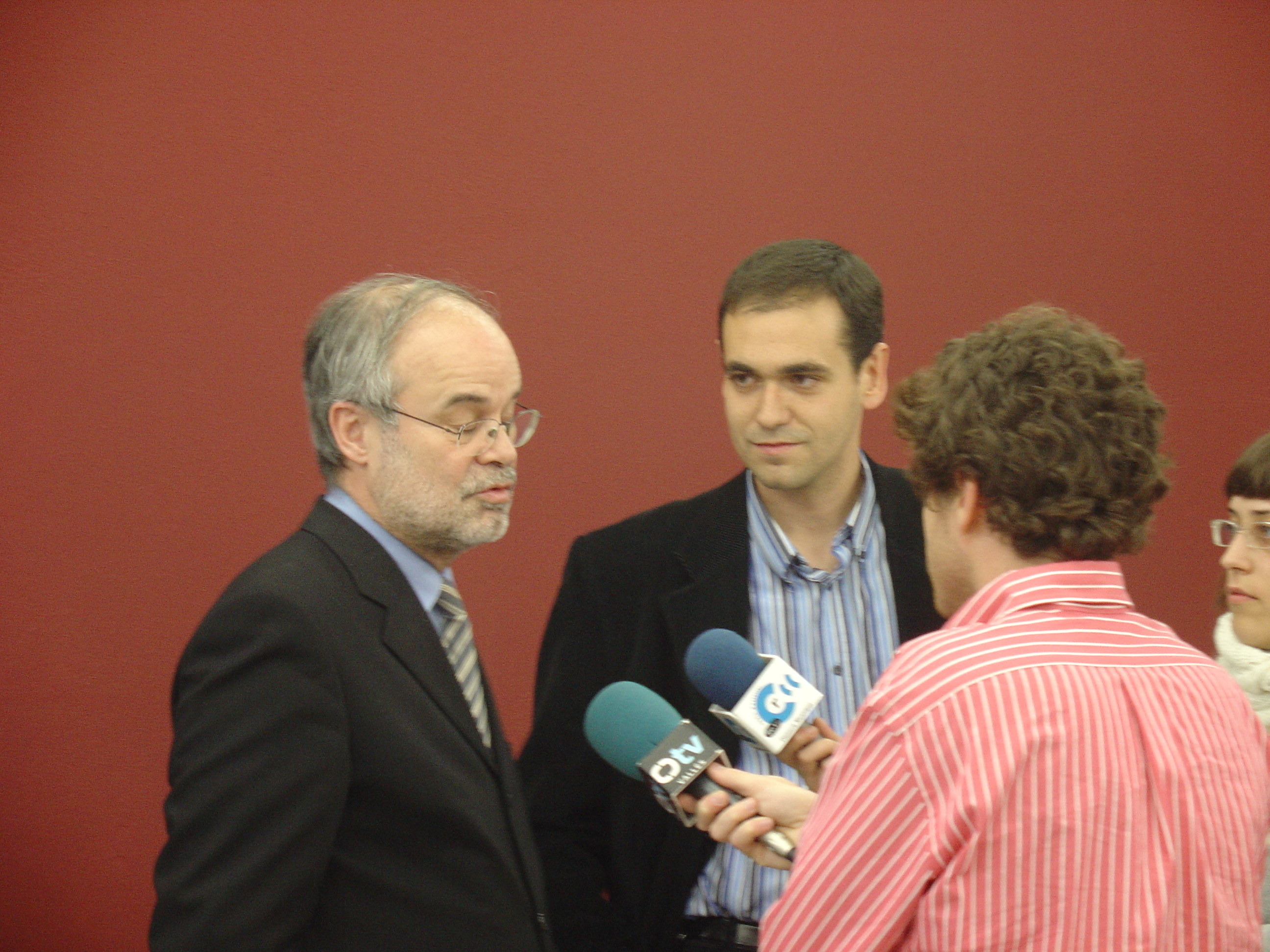

Minister of Economy and Finance of Catalonia
- In office 17 December 2003 – 29 December 2010
- President: Pasqual Maragall (2003-2006); José Montilla (2006-2010)
- Preceded by: Francesc Homs i Ferret
- Succeeded by: Andreu Mas-Colell (as Minister of Economy and Knowledge)

Member of the European Court of Auditors for Spain
- In office 10 February 1994 – 29 February 2000
- President: André J. Middelhoek; Bernhard Friedmann; Jan O. Karlsson
- Preceded by: Josep Subirats
- Succeeded by: Juan Manuel Fabra Vallés

Personal details
- Born: September 24, 1950 (age 75) Barcelona, Catalonia, Spain
- Party: PSC

Antoni Castells i Oliveres (Catalan: [kəsˈteʎs]; born September 24, 1950) is a Catalan and Spanish politician. He is considered one of the most prominent members of the Catalanist wing of the Socialists' Party of Catalonia.

Castells is married and has two children. He lives in Barcelona. He received an Economy degree and a PhD at the University of Barcelona.

He is a lecturer in Public Revenue at the UB. He has been a visiting professor at the Johns Hopkins University of Baltimore (1993) and director of The Institute of Economy of Barcelona until, November 2003.

He has written many books about the topics which he is specialized: fiscal federalism, autonomous and local revenue, regional economy and the economy of the welfare state.

He has been working in the Study Service for the Banca Catalana (until 1983), and member of Audit Office of Catalonia (1984–1989), member of the Catalan part of the Mixed Committee of State-Generalitat Assessment (1989–1996), member of the Catalan Parliament (1992–1994) and Spanish member of the European Court of Auditors (1994–2000).

Currently Secretary of the Economy of the PSC Executive Committee.

== Notes ==
Political offices
Preceded by Francesc Homs Ferret	Minister of Economy and Finance; 2003 – 2010	Succeeded by Andreu Mas-Colell (as Minister of Economy and Knowledge)
