= Antoni Siurana =

Spanish politician

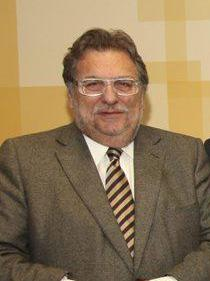

Minister of Agriculture, Livestock and Fisheries of the Generalitat de Catalunya (2003 to 2006) Mayor of Lleida (1979 to 1987 and 1989 to 2003)

Personal details
- Born: 23 February 1943 Lleida (Segrià, Catalonia, Spain)
- Party: PSC

Antoni Siurana i Zaragoza (born 23 February 1943 in Lleida) is a Spanish politician affiliated with the Partit dels Socialistes de Catalunya. He was mayor of Lleida from 1979–1987 and 1989–2003. From 2003–2006, Siurana was the Minister of Agriculture, Livestock and Fisheries of the Generalitat de Catalunya.

Preceded by Josep Grau i Seris	Minister of Agriculture, Livestock and Fisheries; 2003–2006	Succeeded by Jordi William Carnes i Ayats
Preceded by Ernesto Corbella Albiñana	Mayor of Lleida; 1979–1987	Succeeded by Manel Oronich i Miravet
Preceded by Manel Oronich i Miravet	Mayor of Lleida; 1989–2003	Succeeded by Àngel Ros Domingo
