= José Montilla =

Spanish politician

The Right Honourable José Montilla
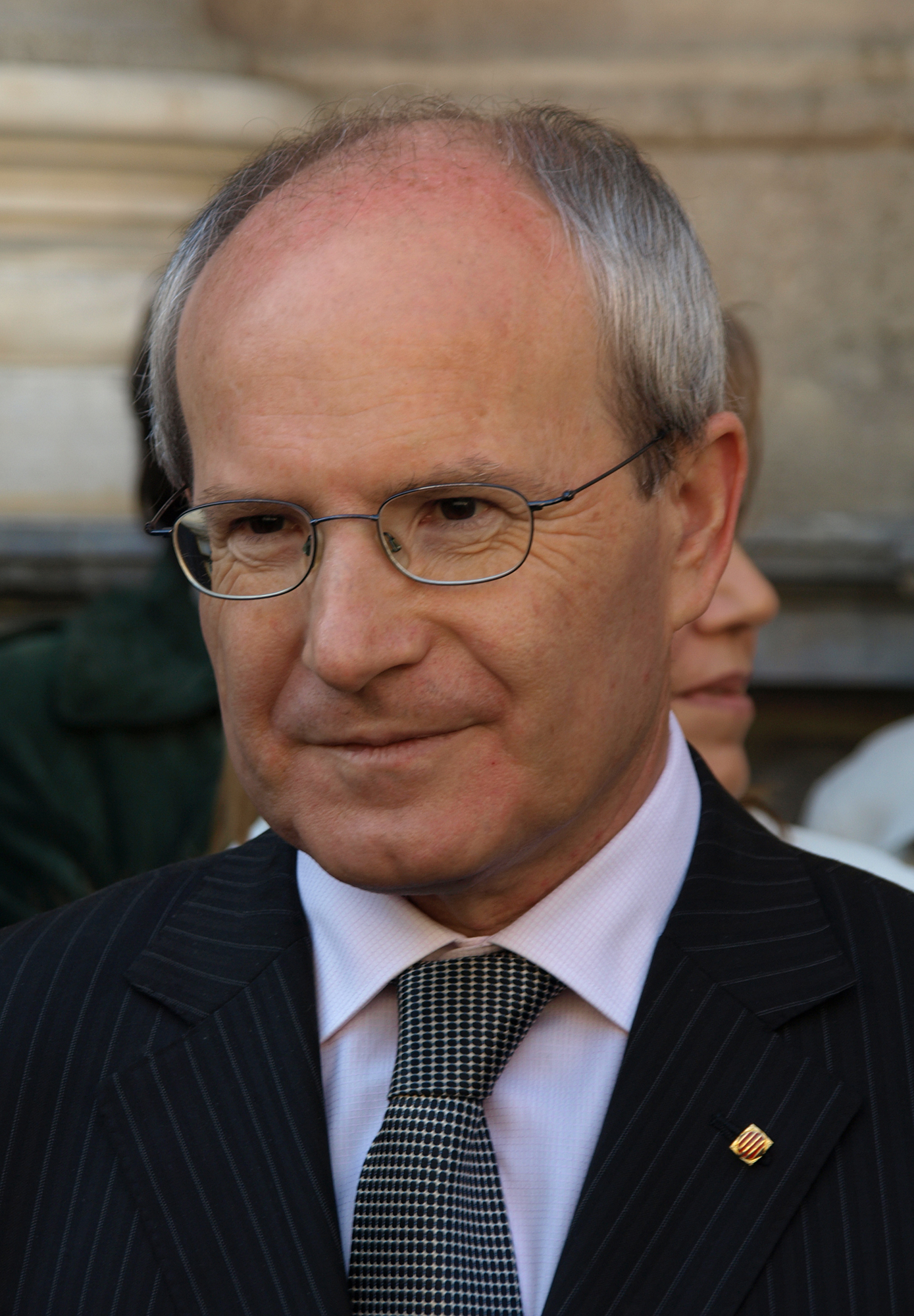

128th President of the Government of Catalonia
- In office 28 November 2006 – 27 December 2010
- Monarch: Juan Carlos I
- Vice President: Josep-Lluís Carod-Rovira
- Preceded by: Pasqual Maragall
- Succeeded by: Artur Mas

Mayor of Cornellà de Llobregat
- In office 1985 – 17 April 2004
- Preceded by: Frederic Prieto
- Succeeded by: Antonio Balmón i Arévalo

Minister of Industry, Trade and Tourism
- In office 17 April 2004 – 8 September 2006
- President: José Luis Rodríguez Zapatero
- Preceded by: Juan Costa Climent
- Succeeded by: Joan Clos

Spanish Senator for designation of the Parliament of Catalonia
- In office 1 December 2011 – 8 May 2019

Personal details
- Born: 15 January 1955 (age 71) Iznájar, Andalusia, Spain
- Party: Socialists' Party of Catalonia
- Spouse: Anna Hernández
- Children: Three sons and two daughters
- Occupation: Politician
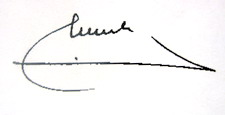
- Signature

José Montilla Aguilera (Spanish pronunciation: [xoˈse monˈtiʎa]; born 15 January 1955 in Iznájar, Andalusia, Spain) is a Spanish politician who is currently a member of the Spanish Senate. He was the 128th President of Generalitat de Catalunya. He became the First Secretary of the Socialists' Party of Catalonia on 18 June 2000, and a member of the Federal Executive Committee and the Federal Committee of the Spanish Socialist Workers' Party (PSOE) on 23 July 2000. He served as Minister of Industry, Tourism and Trade in the government of José Luis Rodríguez Zapatero from 18 April 2004 until 9 September 2006. He is married and has five children. On 29 November 2010 he announced he would not stand again for the post of First Secretary of the PSC due to his party's having obtained its worst-ever results in the 2010 election.

== Childhood and youth (1955–1978) ==
At the age of sixteen, he moved from his native Andalusia to Catalonia and settled in Sant Joan Despí.

His higher education began with vocational training, but later he studied Law for one year and Economics for two years at the University of Barcelona. He himself has said that he gave up his university career as he was working and studying at the same time.

== Local politics (1978–2004) ==
Having joined the Socialists' Party of Catalonia in 1978, two years later he became a member of the party's National Council.

At the age of 25, he was appointed Deputy mayor for Local Taxation in Sant Joan Despí, where he was also the spokesman of the Socialist group on the council. Subsequently, between 1985 and April 2004, he was mayor of Cornellà de Llobregat. In the 1999 elections and again in 2003 he was re-elected with an absolute majority.

In 1988, after the creation of the Consells Comarcals (District Councils), he was elected president of the District Council of Baix Llobregat, a post he occupied until late 1997. He became a member of the Diputació de Barcelona (Provincial Council) in 1983 as Provincial Deputy for Public Works. In 1987, he was appointed second vice-president of the Diputació and in 1991 he became delegate president for Agriculture and the Environment, a post to which he was appointed again in 1995.

In 1999, he was appointed First Vice-president, and he was President of the Diputació from 1 July 2003.

In 1994, he was elected Secretary for Organization of his party, and he became First Secretary of the party on 18 June 2000.

== Minister (2004–2006) ==
After the 2003 election to the Parliament of Catalonia and the constitution of the "Tripartite Government" of the Socialists' Party of Catalonia (PSC), Republican Left of Catalonia (ERC) and Iniciativa per Catalunya Verds (ICV) and his appointment as a central government minister in 2004, he became the PSC strong-man in the central government in Madrid, sitting in the national parliament as deputy for Barcelona district from 2004 to 2006.

His appointment in April 2004 as minister for Industry, Trade and Tourism meant he resigned all his posts in the local administration. He combined his work as minister with the post of First Secretary of the PSC and member of the Federal Executive of the Spanish Socialist Workers' Party (PSOE).

== Return to Catalan politics ==
After Pasqual Maragall announced that he would not stand again as candidate for president of the Generalitat de Catalunya, the National Committee of the PSC elected him as candidate for the presidency of Catalonia in the elections of 1 November 2006. In these elections no party obtained an absolute majority, and the PSC won only the second-largest number of seats after Convergence and Union (CiU); however, the PSC again reached an agreement with ERC and Iniciativa per Catalunya to form a coalition government, with Montilla at its head. He officially took office as president on Tuesday, 28 November 2006, and he was the first President of the Generalitat in modern times to have been born outside Catalonia.

The PSC was defeated in the election held on 28 November 2010, but Montilla remained in office until his successor was elected by the new parliament. In the wake of this defeat, he also announced that he would not stand again as First Secretary of the PSC at the party's next congress. Later, he further announced that he would not lead the opposition in the new parliament, and indeed would not take up his seat.

== Other activities ==
- Enagás, Independent Member of the Board of Directors

Political offices
Preceded by Frederic Prieto	Mayor of Cornellà de Llobregat; 1985–2004	Succeeded by Antonio Balmón i Arévalo
Preceded by Manel Royes i Vila	President of the Diputació de Barcelona; 2003–2004	Succeeded by Celestino Corbacho
Preceded by Juan Costa Climent	Minister of Industry, Trade and Tourism; 2004–2006	Succeeded by Joan Clos
Preceded by Pasqual Maragall	President of the Government of Catalonia; 2006–2010	Succeeded by Artur Mas
Party political offices
Preceded by Narcís Serra	First Secretary of PSC; 2000 – 2011	Succeeded by Pere Navarro i Morera
Preceded by Pasqual Maragall	President of PSC (acting); 2007 – 2008	Succeeded by Isidre Molas
