= List of presidents of the Government of Catalonia =

The list of presidents of the Government of Catalonia compiles the official list of presidents of the Generalitat de Catalunya since its inception in 1359 to present time. It has been the traditional way of listing presidents, starting with Berenguer de Cruïlles. The most recent stable version of the list dates from 2003, by Josep M. Solé i Sabaté in his work Historia de la Generalitat de Catalunya i dels seus presidents. The procedure to set up this list is the following: for the period of the medieval Generalitat (Deputation of the General), the president was the most eminent ecclesiastic deputy of the Deputation of the General of Catalonia (popularly known as Generalitat), a body of the General Court of Catalonia dissolved in 1716 and reinstated for two years in 1874. From April 1931 on, the list includes the elected presidents as well as the proclaimed exiled presidents during the Francoist dictatorship. The functions of the President of the Government of Catalonia have varied considerably over history, in parallel with the attributions of the Generalitat itself.

== Deputation of the General or Generalitat (1359–1716) ==
=== Fourteenth century ===
Here follows a list of representatives of Catalan institutions through the ages. The Presidents as such first appeared with the modern Generalitat in the 20th century.

1. Berenguer de Cruïlles, Bishop of Girona (1359–1366)
2. Romeu Sescomes, Bishop of Lleida (1363–1364)
3. Ramon Gener (1364–1365)
4. Bernat Vallès, canon of Barcelona (1365–1367)
  Romeu Sescomes, Bishop of Lleida (1375–1376)
5. Joan I d'Empúries (1376)
6. Guillem de Guimerà i d'Abella, Grand Prior of the Hospitaller Order of St. John of Jerusalem (1376–1377)
7. Galceren de Besora i de Cartellà, almoner of Ripoll (1377–1378)
  Ramon Gener (1379–1380)
8. Felip d'Anglesola, canon of Tarragona (1380)
9. Pere de Santamans, canon of Tortosa (1381–1383)
10. Arnau Descolomer, cleric from Girona (1384–1389)
11. Miquel de Santjoan, canon of Girona (1389–1396)
12. Alfons de Tous, canon of Barcelona (1396–1413)

=== Fifteenth century ===
12. Alfons de Tous, canon of Barcelona (1396–1413)
13. Marc de Vilalba, Abbot of Montserrat (1413–1416)
14. Andreu Bertran, Bishop of Barcelona (1416–1419)
15. Joan Desgarrigues, Commendatory abbot of Masdéu (1419–1422)
16. Dalmau de Cartellà, Abbot of Ripoll (1422–1425)
17. Felip de Malla, canon of Barcelona (1425–1428)
18. Domènec Ram, Bishop of Lleida (1428–1431)
  Marc de Vilalba, Abbot of Montserrat (1431–1434)
19. Pere de Palou, canon of Barcelona (1434–1437)
20. Pere de Darnius, chief sacristan of Girona (1437–1440)
21. Antoni d'Avinyó i de Moles, Abbot of Montserrat (1440–1443)
22. Jaume de Cardona i de Gandia, canon of Barcelona (1443–1446)
23. Pero Ximénez de Urrea, Archbishop of Tarragona (1446–1449)
24. Bertran Samasó, Abbot of Ripoll (1449–1452)
25. Bernat Guillem Samasó, Abbot of Àger (1452–1455)
26. Nicolau Pujades, archdeacon of Barcelona (1455–1458)
27. Antoni-Pere Ferrer, Abbot of Montserrat (1458–1461)
28. Manuel de Montsuar, canon of Lleida (1461–1464)
29. Francesc Colom, archdeacon of the Vallès (1464–1467)
30. Ponç Andreu de Vilar, Abbot of Ripoll (1467–1470)
31. Miquel Samsó, Abbot of Breda (1470–1473)
32. Joan Maurici de Ribes, Abbot of Santa Maria de la Real of Perpignan (Perpinyà) (1473–1476)
33. Miquel Delgado, Abbot of Poblet (1476–1478)
34. Pere Joan Llobera, sacristan of Sant Joan de les Abadesses (1478–1479)
35. Berenguer de Sos, deacon of Barcelona (1479–1482)
36. Pere de Cardona, Bishop of Urgell (1482–1485)
  Ponç Andreu de Vilar, Abbot of Ripoll (1485–1488)
37. Juan Payo Coello, Abbot of Poblet (1488–1491)
38. Joan de Peralta, Abbot of Montserrat (1491–1494)
39. Francí Vicenç, prior of Tarragona (1494–1497)
40. Pedro de Mendoza, Abbot of Santes Creus (1497–1500)

=== Sixteenth century ===
41. Alfons d'Aragó, Bishop of Tortosa (1500–1503)
42. Ferrer Nicolau de Gualbes i Desvalls, canon of Barcelona (1503–1504)
43. Gonzalo Fernández de Heredia, Archbishop of Tarragona (1504–1506)
44. Lluís Desplà i d'Oms, canon of Barcelona (1506–1509)
45. Jordi Sanç, provost (paborde) of Valencia (1509–1512)
46. Joan d'Aragó, castellan of Amposta (1512–1514)
47. Jaume Fiella (1514–1515)
48. Esteve de Garret, archdeacon of Tortosa (1515–1518)
49. Bernat de Corbera, archdeacon of Tarragona (1518–1521)
50. Joan Margarit i de Requesens, archdeacon of Girona (1521–1524)
51. Lluís de Cardona i Enríquez, Abbot of Solsona (1524–1527)
52. Francesc de Solsona, canon of Lleida (1527–1530)
53. Francesc Oliver i de Boteller, canon of Tortosa (1530–1533)
54. Dionís de Carcassona, canon of Lleida (1533–1536)
55. Joan Pasqual, canon of la Seu d'Urgell (1536–1539)
56. Jeroni de Requesens i Roís de Liori (also known as Girolamo Doria), Archbishop of Tarragona (1539–1542)
57. Miquel Puig, Commedatory abbot of Serrateix (1542–1545)
58. Jaume Caçador, canon of Barcelona (1545–1548)
59. Miquel d'Oms i de Sentmenat, canon of Elna (1548–1551)
60. Onofre de Copons i de Vilafranca, cleric (1551–1552)
61. Miquel de Ferrer i de Marimon (1552)
62. Joan de Tormo (1552–1553)
63. Miquel de Tormo (1553–1554)
64. Francesc Jeroni Benet Franc, archdeacon of Barcelona (1554–1557)
65. Pere Àngel Ferrer i Despuig, Abbot of Sant Cugat del Vallès (1557–1559)
66. Ferran de Lloaces i Peres, canon of Elna (1559–1560)
  Miquel d'Oms i de Sentmenat, canon of Elna (1560–1563)
67. Onofre Gomis (1563–1566)
68. Francesc Giginta, Abbot of Amer (1566–1569)
69. Benet de Tocco (also known as Marco Antoni di Tocco), Bishop of Vic (1569–1572)
70. Jaume Cerveró, canon of Tortosa (1572–1575)
71. Pere Oliver de Boteller i de Riquer, canon of Tortosa (1575–1578)
  Benet de Tocco (also known as Marco Antoni di Tocco), Bishop of Girona (1578–1581)
72. Rafael d'Oms, archdeacon of Tarragona (1581–1584)
73. Jaume Beuló, canon of Vic (1584)
  Pere Oliver de Boteller i de Riquer, canon of Tortosa (1584–1587)
74. Martí Joan de Calders (1587)
75. Francesc Oliver de Boteller, Abbot of Poblet (1587–1588)
76. Jaume Caçador i Claret, Bishop of Girona (1590–1593)
77. Miquel d'Agullana, canon of Girona (1593–1596)
  Francesc Oliver de Boteller, Abbot of Poblet (1596–1598)
78. Francesc Oliveres (1598–1599)
79. Jaume Cordelles i Oms, canon of Barcelona (1599–1602)

=== Seventeenth century ===
79. Jaume Cordelles i Oms, canon of Barcelona (1599–1602)
80. Bernat de Cardona i de Queralt, Abbot of Cuixà (1602–1605)
81. Pere Pau Caçador i d'Aguilar-Dusai, canon of Barcelona (1605–1608)
82. Onofre d'Alentorn i de Botella, canon of Lleida (1608–1611)
83. Francesc de Sentjust i de Castre, Abbot of Arles (1611–1614)
84. Ramon d'Olmera i d'Alemany, commander of the Hospitaller Order of St. John of Jerusalem (1614–1616)
85. Miquel d'Aimeric (1616–1617)
86. Lluís de Tena, Bishop of Tortosa (1617–1620)
87. Benet Fontanella, Abbot of Besalú (1620–1623)
88. Pere de Magarola i Fontanet, Bishop of Elna (1623–1626)
89. Francesc Morillo, Archdeacon of la Seu d'Urgell (1626–1629)
90. Pere Antoni Serra, Bishop of Lleida (1629–1632)
91. Esteve Salacruz Abbot of Sant Pere de Galligants (1632)
92. García Gil Manrique, Bishop of Girona (1632–1635)
93. Miquel d'Alentorn i de Salbà, Abbot of Amer (1635–1638)
94. Pau Claris i Casademunt, archdeacon of la Seu d'Urgell (1638–1641)
95. Josep Soler (1641)
96. Bernat de Cardona i de Raset, archdeacon of Girona (1641–1644)
97. Gispert d'Amat i Desbosc de Sant Vincenç, Abbot of Sant Pere de Galligants (1644–1647)
98. Andreu Pont, Abbot of Amer (1647–1650)
99. Pau del Rosso, deacon of Barcelona (1650–1654)
100. Francesc Pijoan (1654–1656)
101. Josep Jeroni Besora, deacon of Barcelona (1656–1659)
102. Pau d'Àger, canon of Lleida (1659–1662)
103. Jaume de Copons i de Tamarit, canon of la Seu d'Urgell (1662–1665)
104. Josep de Magarola i de Grau, Abbot of Camprodon (1665–1668)
105. Joan Pagès i Vallgornera, canon (1668–1671)
106. Josep de Camporells i de Sabater, canon of la Seu d'Urgell (1671–1674)
107. Esteve Mercadal i Dou, archdeacon of Vic (1674–1677)
108. Alfonso de Sotomayor, Bishop of Barcelona (1677–1680)
109. Josep Sastre i Prats, Abbot of Sant Pau de Camp (1680–1683)
110. Baltasar de Muntaner i de Sacosta, provost (paborde) of Berga (1683–1686)
111. Antoni de Saiol i de Quarteroni, canon of Barcelona (1686–1689)
112. Benet Ignasi de Salazar, Bishop of Barcelona (1689–1692)
113. Antoni de Planella i de Cruïlles, Abbot of Besalú (1692–1695)
114. Rafael de Pinyana i Galvany, canon of Tortosa (1695–1698)
115. Climent de Solanell i de Foix, almoner of Àger (1698–1701)

=== Eighteenth century ===
115. Climent de Solanell i de Foix, almoner of Àger (1698–1701)
116. Josep Antoni Valls i Pandutxo (1701)
  Antoni de Planella i de Cruïlles, Abbot of Besalu (1701–1704)
117. Francesc de Valls i Freixa (1704–1705)
118. Josep Grau, deacon of Solsona (1705–1707)
119. Manuel de Copons i d'Esquerrer, of Santa Maria de Banyoles (1707–1710)
120. Francesc Antoni de Solanell i de Montella, Abbot of Sant Pere de Galligants (1710–1713)
121. Josep de Vilamala, sacristan of Sant Esteve de Banyoles (1713–1716)

== Modern Generalitat (1931–present) ==
=== Second Republic and exile (1931–1977) ===
Governments

- ERC
- War cabinet
- Mixed coalition

Portrait	Name (Birth–Death)	Term of office			Party	Government Composition	Election	President (Tenure)	Ref.
Portrait	Name (Birth–Death)	Took office	Left office	Duration	Party	Government Composition	Election	President (Tenure)	Ref.
	Francesc Macià (1859–1933)	14 April 1931	14 December 1932	2 years and 255 days	ERC	Macià I ERC–USC–UGT–PRR–PCR	N/A	President; Niceto; Alcalá-Zamora (1931–1936)	
	Francesc Macià (1859–1933)	14 December 1932	25 December 1933†	2 years and 255 days	ERC	Macià II; ERC	1932	President; Niceto; Alcalá-Zamora (1931–1936)	
	Lluís Companys (1882–1940)	25 December 1933	31 July 1936	6 years and 295 days	ERC	Companys I ERC–USC–ACR–PNRE	1932	President; Niceto; Alcalá-Zamora (1931–1936)	
	Lluís Companys (1882–1940)	25 December 1933	31 July 1936	6 years and 295 days	ERC	Companys I ERC–USC–ACR–PNRE	1932	President; Manuel Azaña (1936–1939)	
	Lluís Companys (1882–1940)	31 July 1936	15 October 1940† (assassinated)	6 years and 295 days	ERC	Companys II; ERC–PSUC–UR–UGT–ACR– CNT from Sep 1936	1932	President; Manuel Azaña (1936–1939)	
	Josep Irla (1874–1958)	15 October 1940	7 August 1954	13 years and 235 days	ERC	In exile	N/A	Spanish Republican government in exile (1939–1977)	
	Josep Tarradellas (1899–1988)	7 August 1954	18 October 1977	23 years and 72 days	ERC	In exile	N/A	Spanish Republican government in exile (1939–1977)	

=== Restored autonomy (1977–present) ===
Governments

- CiU
- Tripartite
- Junts pel Sí
- PSC
- Mixed coalition

Portrait	Name (Birth–Death)	Term of office			Party	Government Composition	Election	Monarch (Reign)	Ref.
Portrait	Name (Birth–Death)	Took office	Left office	Duration	Party	Government Composition	Election	Monarch (Reign)	Ref.
	Josep Tarradellas (1899–1988)	18 October 1977	29 April 1980	2 years and 194 days	ERC	Tarradellas; PSC–ERC–PSUC–CDC–UCD	N/A	King; Juan Carlos I (1975–2014)	
	Jordi Pujol (born 1930)	29 April 1980	13 June 1984	23 years and 233 days	CDC	Pujol I CiU	1980	King; Juan Carlos I (1975–2014)	
	Jordi Pujol (born 1930)	13 June 1984	1 July 1988	23 years and 233 days	CDC	Pujol II; CiU–ERC until Feb 1987; CiU from Feb 1987	1984	King; Juan Carlos I (1975–2014)	
	Jordi Pujol (born 1930)	1 July 1988	13 April 1992	23 years and 233 days	CDC	Pujol III; CiU	1988	King; Juan Carlos I (1975–2014)	
	Jordi Pujol (born 1930)	13 April 1992	21 December 1995	23 years and 233 days	CDC	Pujol IV; CiU	1992	King; Juan Carlos I (1975–2014)	
	Jordi Pujol (born 1930)	21 December 1995	24 November 1999	23 years and 233 days	CDC	Pujol V CiU	1995	King; Juan Carlos I (1975–2014)	
	Jordi Pujol (born 1930)	24 November 1999	18 December 2003	23 years and 233 days	CDC	Pujol VI; CiU	1999	King; Juan Carlos I (1975–2014)	
	Pasqual Maragall (born 1941)	18 December 2003	28 November 2006	2 years and 345 days	PSC	Maragall; PSC–ERC–ICV–CpC until May 2006; PSC–ICV–CpC from May 2006	2003	King; Juan Carlos I (1975–2014)	
	José Montilla (born 1955)	28 November 2006	27 December 2010	4 years and 29 days	PSC	Montilla; PSC–ERC–ICV	2006	King; Juan Carlos I (1975–2014)	
	Artur Mas (born 1956)	27 December 2010	24 December 2012	5 years and 16 days	CDC	Mas I CiU	2010	King; Juan Carlos I (1975–2014)	
	Artur Mas (born 1956)	24 December 2012	12 January 2016	5 years and 16 days	CDC	Mas II; CiU until Jun 2015; CDC from Jun 2015	2012	King; Juan Carlos I (1975–2014)	
	Artur Mas (born 1956)	24 December 2012	12 January 2016	5 years and 16 days	CDC	Mas II; CiU until Jun 2015; CDC from Jun 2015	2012	King; Felipe VI (2014–present)	
	Carles Puigdemont (born 1962)	12 January 2016	28 October 2017 (removed)	1 year and 289 days	CDC	Puigdemont; CDC/PDeCAT–ERC	2015	King; Felipe VI (2014–present)	
	Carles Puigdemont (born 1962)	12 January 2016	28 October 2017 (removed)	1 year and 289 days	PDeCAT	Puigdemont; CDC/PDeCAT–ERC	2015	King; Felipe VI (2014–present)	
During this interval, the office was suspended.						Direct rule over Catalonia	N/A	King; Felipe VI (2014–present)	
	Quim Torra (born 1962)	16 May 2018	28 September 2020 (disqualified)	2 years and 135 days	Independent	Torra; ERC–JuntsxCat until Sep 2020; ERC–JxCat from Sep 2020	2017	King; Felipe VI (2014–present)	
During this interval, Vice President Pere Aragonès served as acting officeholder.						Torra; ERC–JuntsxCat until Sep 2020; ERC–JxCat from Sep 2020	2017	King; Felipe VI (2014–present)	
	Pere Aragonès (born 1982)	22 May 2021	10 August 2024	3 years and 80 days	ERC	Aragonès; ERC–Junts until Oct 2022; ERC from Oct 2022	2021	King; Felipe VI (2014–present)	
	Salvador Illa (born 1966)	10 August 2024	Incumbent	2 years and 66 days	PSC	Illa; PSC	2024	King; Felipe VI (2014–present)	

== See also ==
- Generalitat de Catalunya
- President of the Government of Catalonia

== Notes ==
^† Died in office / ^‡ assassinated.
