= Sant Esteve =

Sant Esteve (Catalan for Saint Stephen) may refer to:

== Places ==
Spain

- Església de Sant Esteve
- Església de Sant Esteve de Bixessarri
- Sant Esteve, Balsareny
- Sant Esteve de Banyoles
- Sant Esteve de Palautordera
- Sant Esteve de la Sarga
- Sant Esteve Sesrovires
