= El Casot =

el Casot
- Singular population entity
- Location within Spain Location within Catalonia Location within Province of Barcelona
- Coordinates: 41°37′30.1″N 1°47′56.4″E
- Country: Spain
- A. community: Catalunya
- Province: Barcelona
- Municipality: Marganell

Population (January 1, 2024)
  - Total: 148
- Time zone: UTC+01:00
- Postal code: 08298
- MCN: 08242000200

el Casot is a singular population entity in the municipality of Marganell, in Catalonia, Spain.

As of 2024 it has a population of 148 people.
