= Pla de Roldors =

- Singular population entity
- Location within Spain Location within Catalonia Location within Province of Barcelona
- Coordinates: 41°38′36.3″N 1°47′23.0″E
- Country: Spain
- A. community: Catalunya
- Province: Barcelona
- Municipality: Marganell

Population (January 1, 2024)
  - Total: 24
- Time zone: UTC+01:00
- Postal code: 08298
- MCN: 08242000300

Pla de Roldors is a singular population entity in the municipality of Marganell, in Catalonia, Spain.

As of 2024 it has a population of 24 people.
