= Àngel Caldas i Bosch =

Spanish priest (1927–2026)

- Church: Catholic Church
- Diocese: Diocese of Girona
- Installed: 1951
- Term ended: 1952

Orders
- Ordination: 1 July 1951

Personal details
- Born: 7 November 1927 Cassà de la Selva, Catalonia, Spain
- Died: 25 July 2026 (aged 98) Salt, Spain

Àngel Caldas i Bosch (7 November 1927 – 25 July 2026) was a Spanish Catholic priest and writer. He served as the first parish priest of the Church of Sant Jaume from 1965, when it was founded, until 2003. He also founded the Les Vetes retirement home for old people. After being ordained in 1951 at the Monastery of Sant Esteve in Banyoles, his first serving career was as a vicar in Salt from 1951 to 1952.

== Biography ==
Àngel Caldas i Bosch was born in Cassà de la Selva on 7 November 1927. At five years old, he moved to Perpignan, France, to live with his grandma and his uncle, who was a priest. He studied at Seminary of Perpignan until he was fifteen. He completed his French baccalaureate at the Lycée Français de Barcelone. When he was seventeen, Caldas entered the Diocese of Girona, where he completed his studies in philosophy and theology. He was ordained a priest on July 1, 1951 at the Sant Esteve in Banyoles. He later earned a certificate in Canon Law from the University of Navarra with the thesis El ministerio sacerdotal en Torras i Bages in 1983. He was also a professor of canon law at the National University of Distance Education and French language and literature at the Seminary of Girona.

In 2009, Caldas was appointed the postulator of the cause of canonization of the priest Pere Arolas i Vergés and other religious figures who died during the Spanish Civil War. He collaborated with the Diari de Girona, where he published opinion articles and reflections on religious and social issues. In 2002, he received the Tres de Març de Salt Award in recognition of his career in the service of the municipality.

Caldas died in Salt on 7 November 1927, at the age of 98.
