= Colònia Puig =

Place in Catalonia, Spain

- Singular population entity
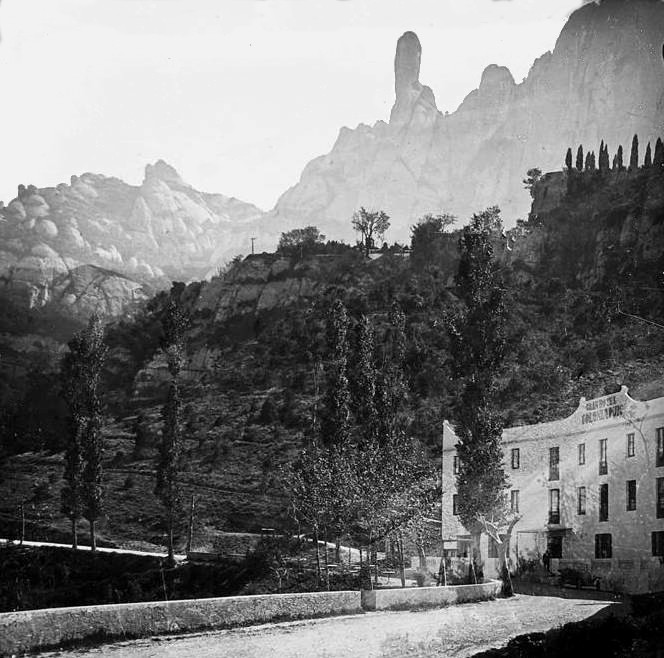
- View of Colònia Puig in 1920

- Location within Spain Location within Catalonia Location within Province of Barcelona
- Coordinates: 41°36′30.2″N 1°49′31.4″E
- Country: Spain
- A. community: Catalunya
- Province: Barcelona
- Municipality: Marganell

Population (January 1, 2024)
  - Total: 25
- Time zone: UTC+01:00
- Postal code: 08199
- MCN: 08242000100

Colònia Puig is a singular population entity in the municipality of Marganell, in Catalonia, Spain.

As of 2024 it has a population of 25 people.
