= Berenguer de Cruïlles =

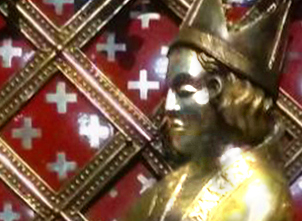
- Berenguer de Cruïlles features in a relief at the Cathedral of Girona

1st President of the Deputation of the General of Catalonia
- In office 1359–1362
- Preceded by: Position established
- Succeeded by: Romeu Sescomes

Personal details
- Born: ~ 1310 Peratallada ?, Principality of Catalonia
- Died: 1362 Barcelona, Principality of Catalonia
- Bishop of Girona
- See: Girona
- In office: 22 March 1349–26 July 1362
- Predecessor: Arnau de Mont-rodon
- Successor: Ènnec de Vallterra

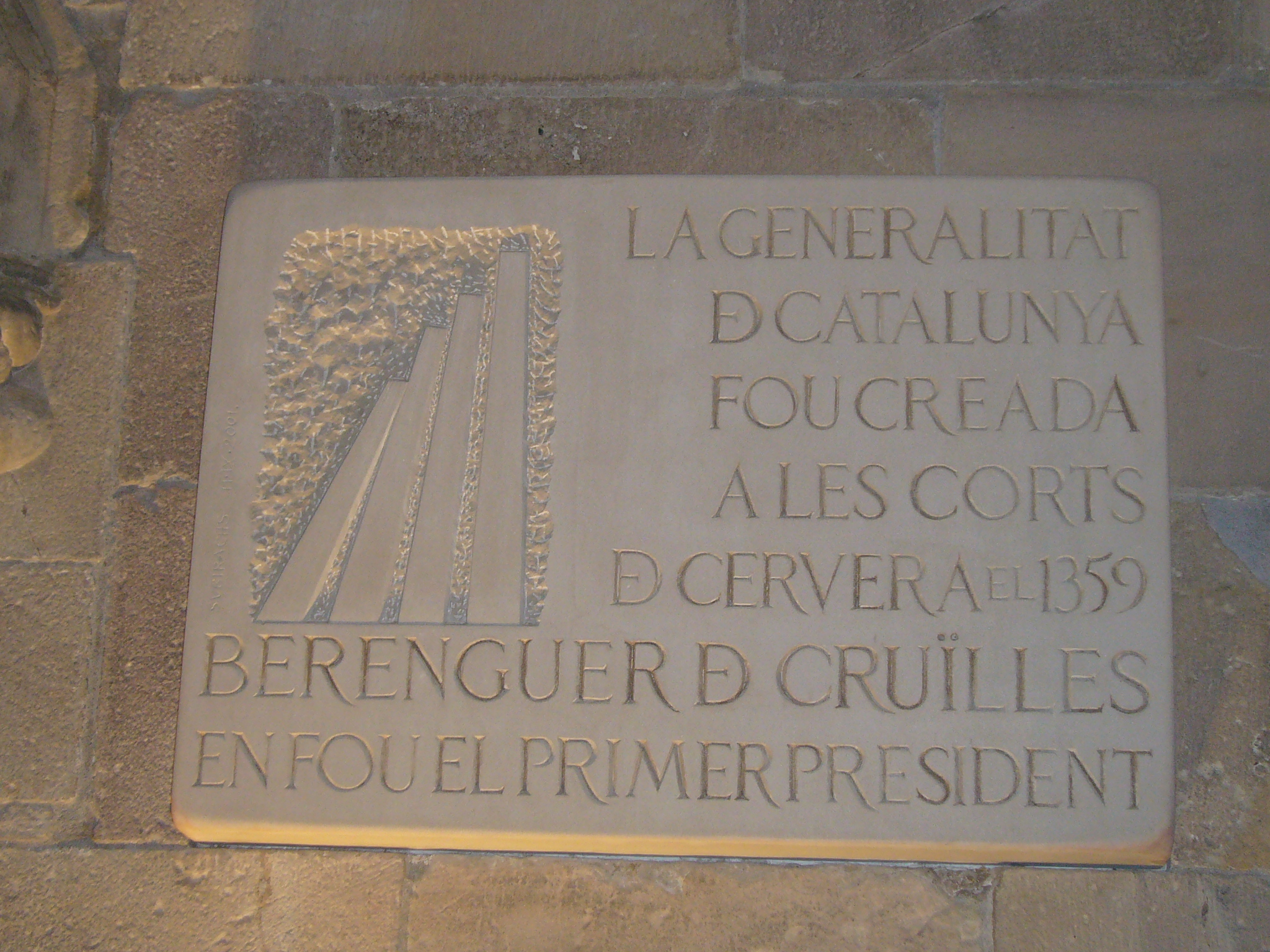
Plaque dedicated to Berenguer de Cruïlles at the Catalan government building in Barcelona, reading: The Generalitat de Catalunya was created at the Corts of Cervera in 1359. Berenguer de Cruïlles was its first president.

Berenguer de Cruïlles (Peratallada, 1310 – Barcelona, 1362) was the bishop of Girona (1349–1362) and the first president of the Generalitat de Catalunya (1359–1362), nominated by the Catalan Courts held in Cervera in 1359.

De Cruïlles was born around 1310 in Peratallada, a town in eastern Catalonia, and died in Barcelona in 1362. He was a member of the clergy at the See of Girona in 1321, canon in 1330, precentor in 1336, abbot of Sant Feliu in 1342, and was finally appointed bishop by Pope Clement VI. He was a fervent supporter of the excommunication of Ramon Berenguer I, Count of Empúries, uncle of the king. In 1357, he gave financial aid for the completion of the gold and wrought silver altarpiece for the cathedral, begun by his predecessor, bishop Gilabert de Cruïlles (1334–35). He was a pioneer inquisitor and a persecutor of heretics.
