= Palace of the Generalitat of Catalonia =

Historic palace and current government building in Barcelona, Spain

Coordinates: 41°22′58″N 2°10′36″E

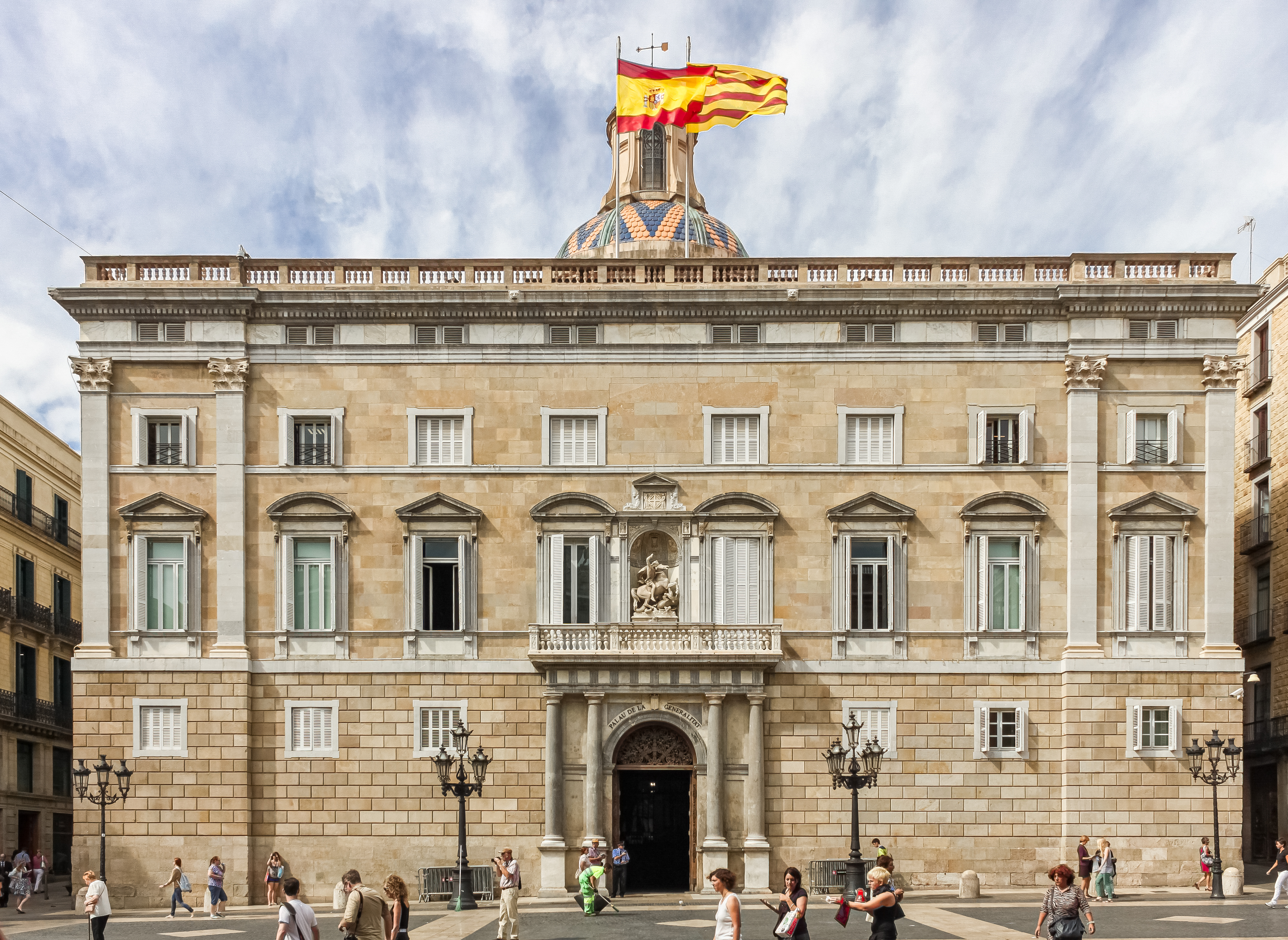
The Palau de la Generalitat de Catalunya

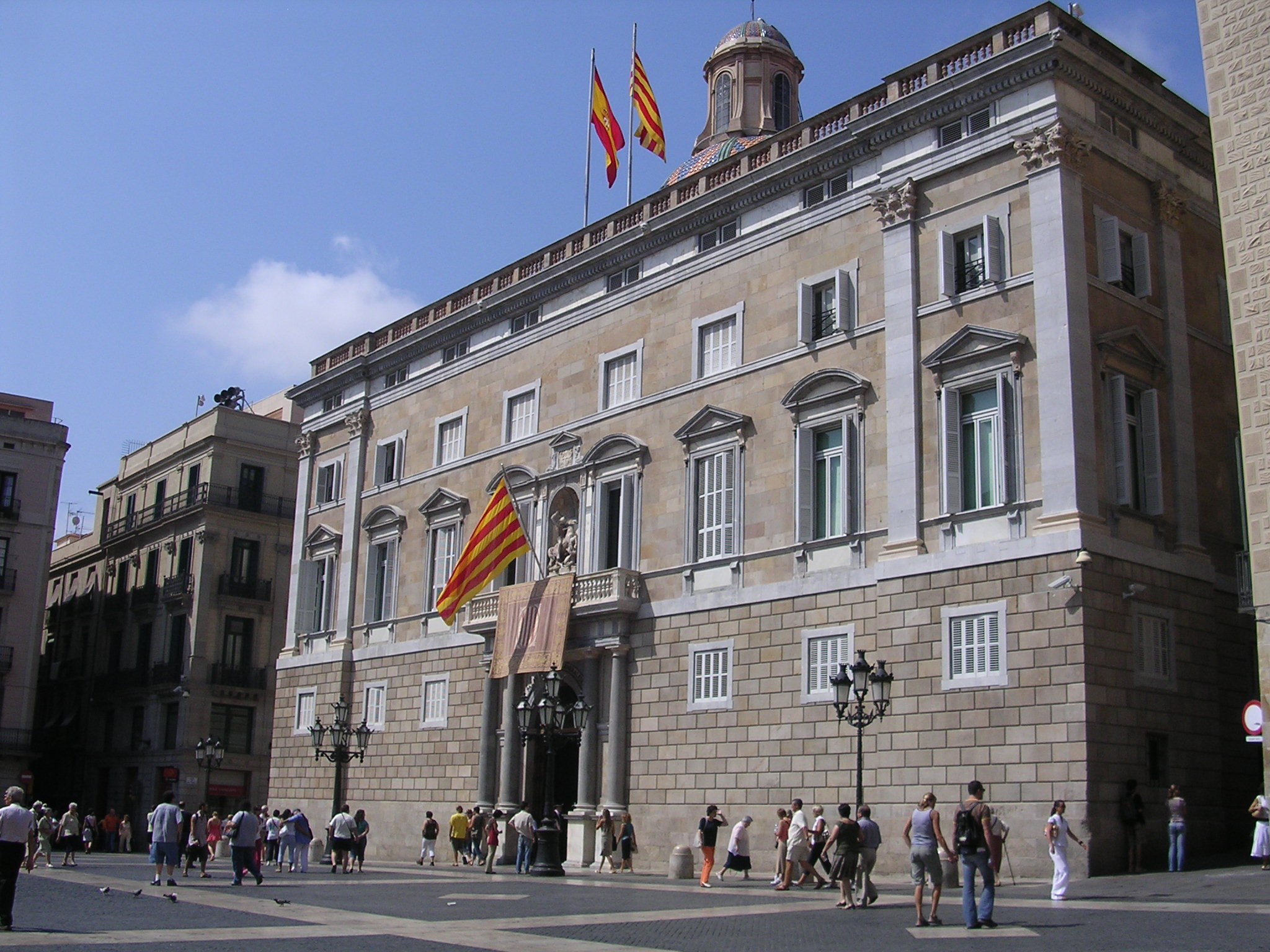
Palace of the Generalitat on the National Day of Catalonia

The Palace of the Generalitat of Catalonia (Catalan: Palau de la Generalitat de Catalunya, IPA: [pəˈlaw ðə lə ʒənəɾəliˈtad də kətəˈluɲə]; Spanish: Palacio de la Generalidad de Cataluña) is a historic palace in Barcelona, Catalonia, Spain. It houses the offices of the Presidency of the Generalitat de Catalunya. It is one of the few buildings of medieval origin in Europe that still functions as a seat of government and houses the institution that originally built it.

The palace is located in the district of Ciutat Vella in Barcelona. It is bounded by the Carrer del Bisbe, Carrer de Sant Sever and Carrer de Sant Honorat. Its principal façade gives onto the Plaça de Sant Jaume, across from the City Hall of Barcelona.

The original building was purchased in 1400 by then-president Alfons de Tous. It was located on the Carrer de Sant Honorat, in the former Jewish Quarter, or Call. The first extension (in the year 1416) faced the street and was carried out by Bishop Marc Safont, who also built the chapel of St. George, in 1434.

In 1596, Pere Blai designed the current principal façade on the Plaça de Sant Jaume, in the Renaissance style. This is the first grand façade of this architectural style in Catalonia. Thereafter, several other houses were purchased and integrated into the palace.

== History ==
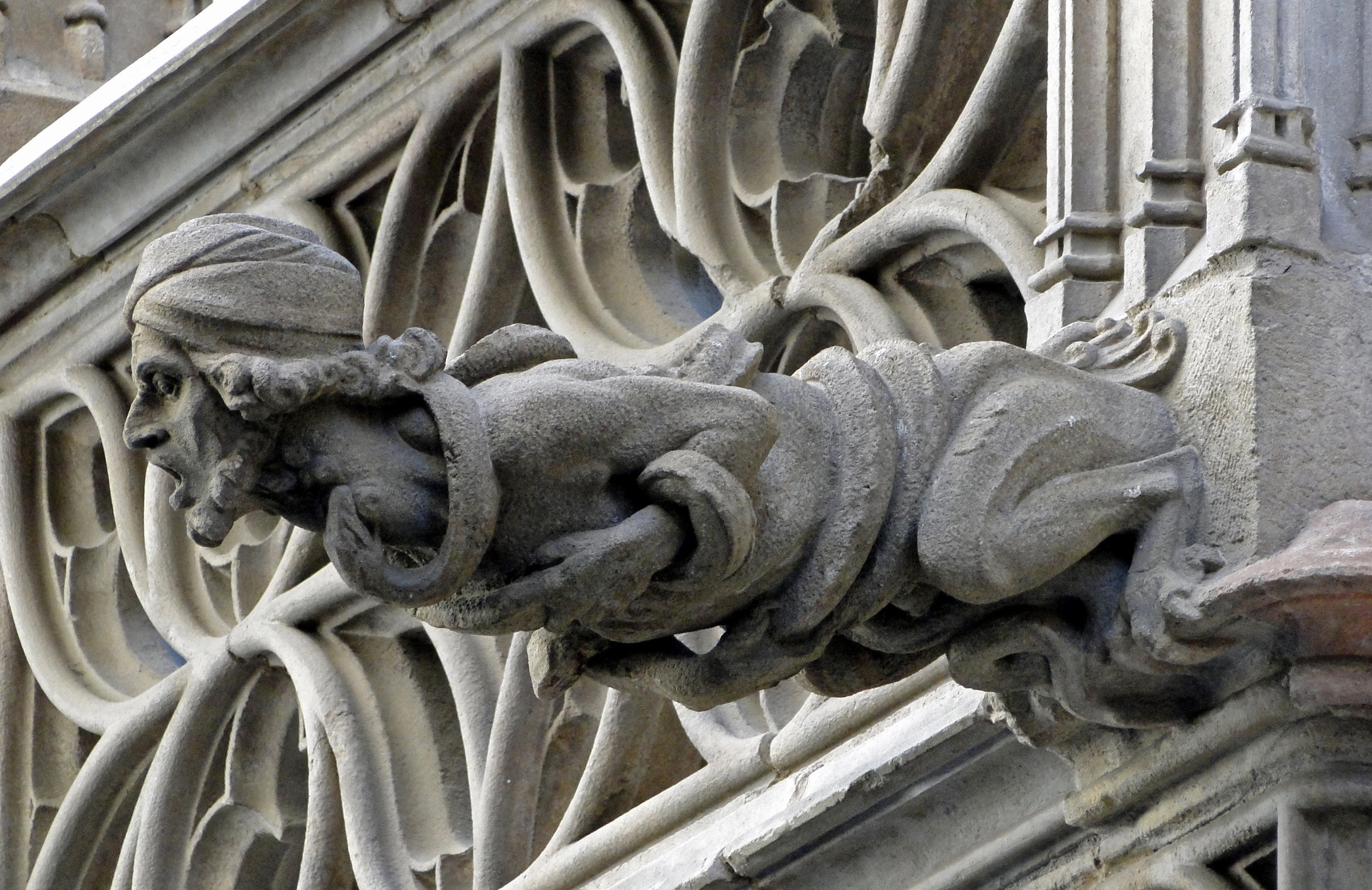
Gargoyle on the Palau de la Generalitat

The Palau de la Generalitat today is not just a public building with historical associations. It is also the seat of the Government of Catalonia and the Presidency of the Generalitat.

One hundred and thirty-three presidents have governed from this house, from Berenguer de Cruïlles (1359) to the current president, Salvador Illa.

=== Origins ===
In 1289, the Catalan 'Corts' or Parliament – considered as of the year 1300 as representing the totality or 'generality' (Generalitat) of Catalonia – formed a commission to collect the taxes that the Corts granted the king. The Corts – or 'General Assembly' of Catalonia, meeting at Cervera in 1359, formalised that commission or Deputation (Diputació) of the General. It consisted of deputies from the three estates: military or noble, ecclesiastical, and popular or royal (representatives of the guilds and citizens of towns directly subject to the king).

=== 15th century ===
At the start of the 15th century, that Diputació del General, or Generalitat, replaced to some degree royal power by implementing the decisions of the Catalan Corts. The exercise of these functions gave rise to the oldest part of the current Palau de la Generalitat (1403), one of the few mediaeval buildings in Europe that is still today the seat of the institution that originally built it.

=== First abolition ===
Centuries later, at the start of the 18th century, King Philip V of Spain fought against Catalonia, as the region had decided to defend the Arch-duke Charles of Austria as pretender to the Spanish throne. This conflict, part of the War of the Spanish Succession, ended on September 11, 1714, when Barcelona fell into the hands of the absolutists of Philip V. The Generalitat and the Corts Catalanes were abolished and the Palau de la Generalitat became the King's Court in Barcelona.

=== First restoration ===
The institutions of the Generalitat were not restored until the 20th century, when, as a result of their sweeping victory of the 1931 municipal elections, Francesc Macià formed a pact with the Spanish central government for the re-establishment of the Generalitat, Government of Catalonia. He later became its president (1931–1933). Macià abolished the four Provincial Councils (Diputaciones), and this Palau (palace) became once more the seat of the Generalitat and its Government. The Statute of Autonomy of 1932 granted Catalonia a parliament, its own justice system (with the Tribunal de Cassació or High Court), and its own police force. In 1934, his successor, President Lluís Companys, completed the unification of autonomous political power through the suppression of the provincial civil governors, a role created by the Madrid Government in the 19th century.

=== Second abolition ===
After the 1936–1939 Spanish Civil War, the Generalitat went into exile. Francisco Franco's new regime repeated the repression of Philip V and also abolished the institutions of the Generalitat. Its president, Lluís Companys, defender of Republican constitutional legality, was tried by a court martial, sentenced to death and shot at Montjuïc Castle (1940).

After Companys' death, Josep Irla, last president of the Catalan parliament, took charge of the Presidency of the Generalitat in exile until in 1954 Josep Tarradellas succeeded him, also in exile.

Centralism once again imposed its civil governors and Provincial Councils, and the Diputación de Barcelona was once again installed in this palace. The division of Catalonia into four provinces ignored the traditional division of Catalonia into comarques.

=== Second restoration ===
After democracy was restored to Spain and after the 1977 Spanish general election, the Palau became once again the seat of the Generalitat, which was restored on September 29, 1977, before the approval of the Spanish Constitution of 1978. A new Statute of Autonomy was passed as law in December 1979, and the elections of March 20, 1980 appointed 135 deputies to the Parliament of Catalonia. The Parliament was convened on April 10. Finally, with the election of the president of the Parliament and the president of the Generalitat, so forming the first Government under the Statute, the Generalitat was basically re-established.

== Architecture ==
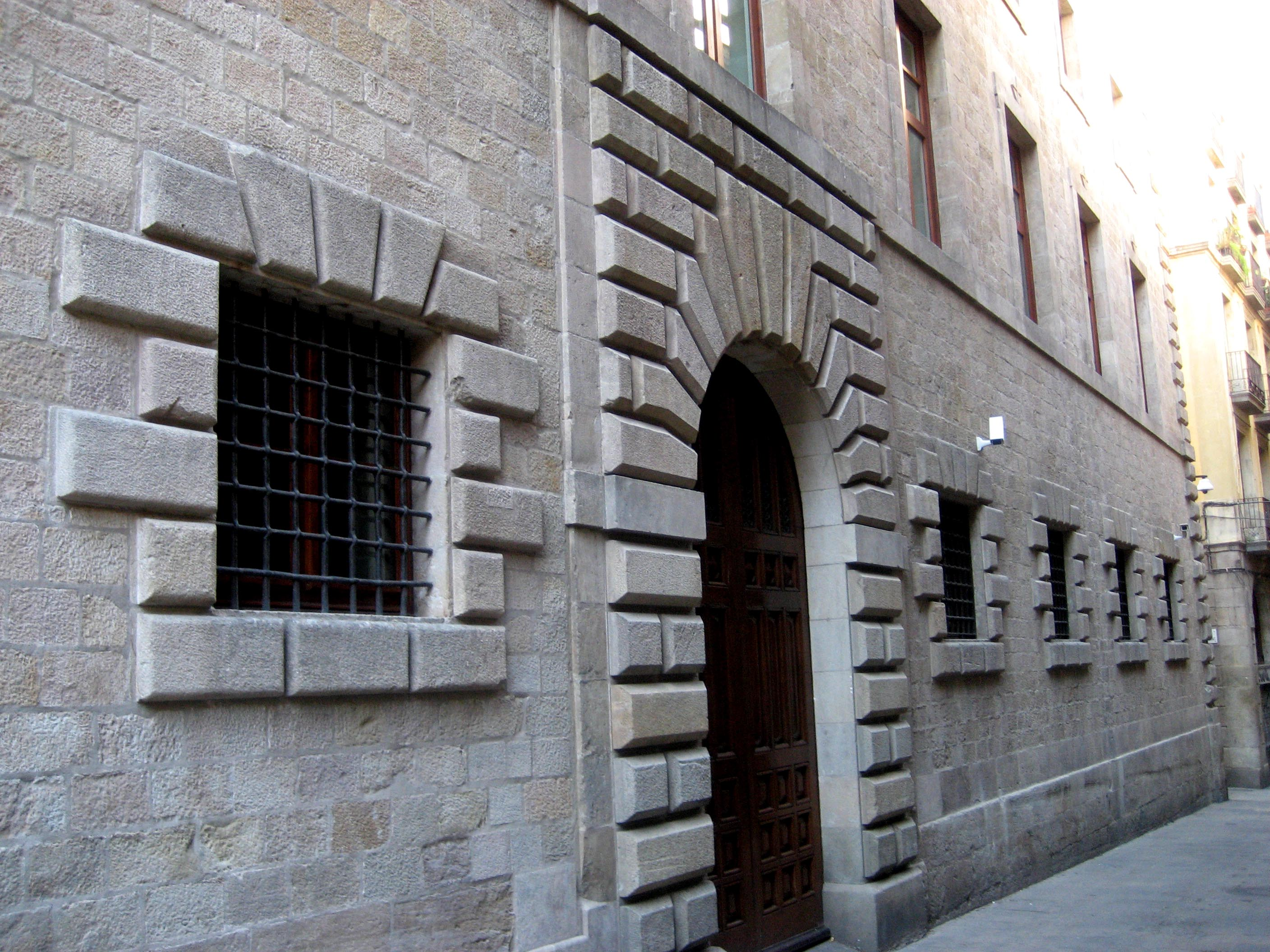
Façade on the Carrer Sant Sever by Pere Pau Ferrer

The current structure actually predates its use as a governmental headquarters, and had to be adapted to its new functions with constructions and renovations from the early 15th century to the mid-17th century. It has Gothic elements, such as its central courtyard with a grand staircase and galleries surrounding it. The original façade of the building, facing the Carrer del Bisbe, was also built in the flamboyant Gothic style, as was the chapel of Sant Jordi. The building's present main façade was built in the Renaissance, and it faces the Plaça de Sant Jaume. The four dark granite columns of the main entrance were originally sculpted in Troy and brought first, together with 45 more, to Tarragona on the occasion of Emperor Hadrian's stay in the city, which took place during the winter of 122–123 DC. Between 1610 and 1630, Pere Ferrer and his son Pere Pau Ferrer carried out the work on the façades on Carrer Sant Honorat and on Carrer Sant Sever. They also constructed a new gate on Carrer Bisbe in the Vignolesc style, similar to the one on the Carrer de Sant Sever.

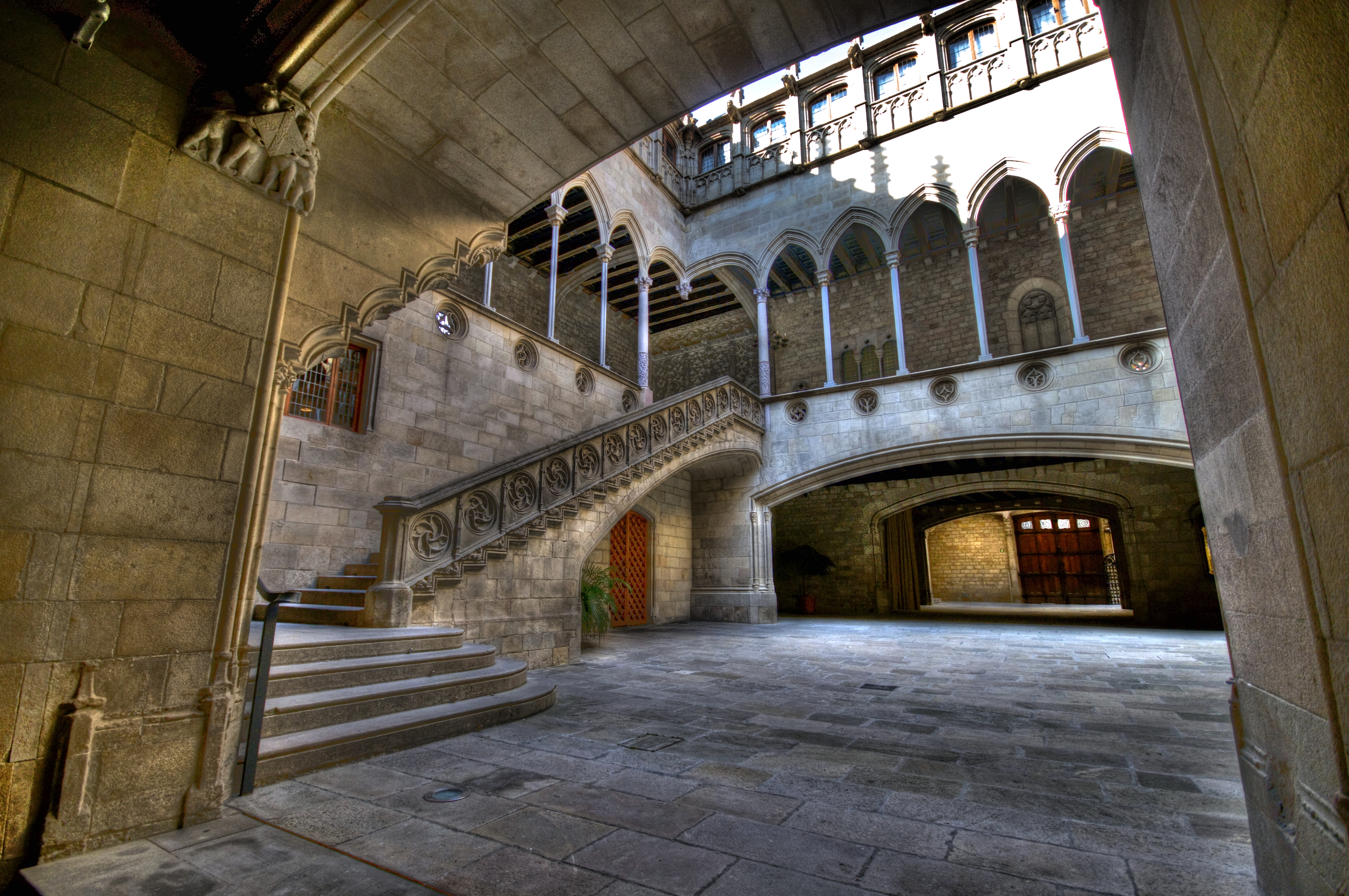
Gothic gallery and inner courtyard

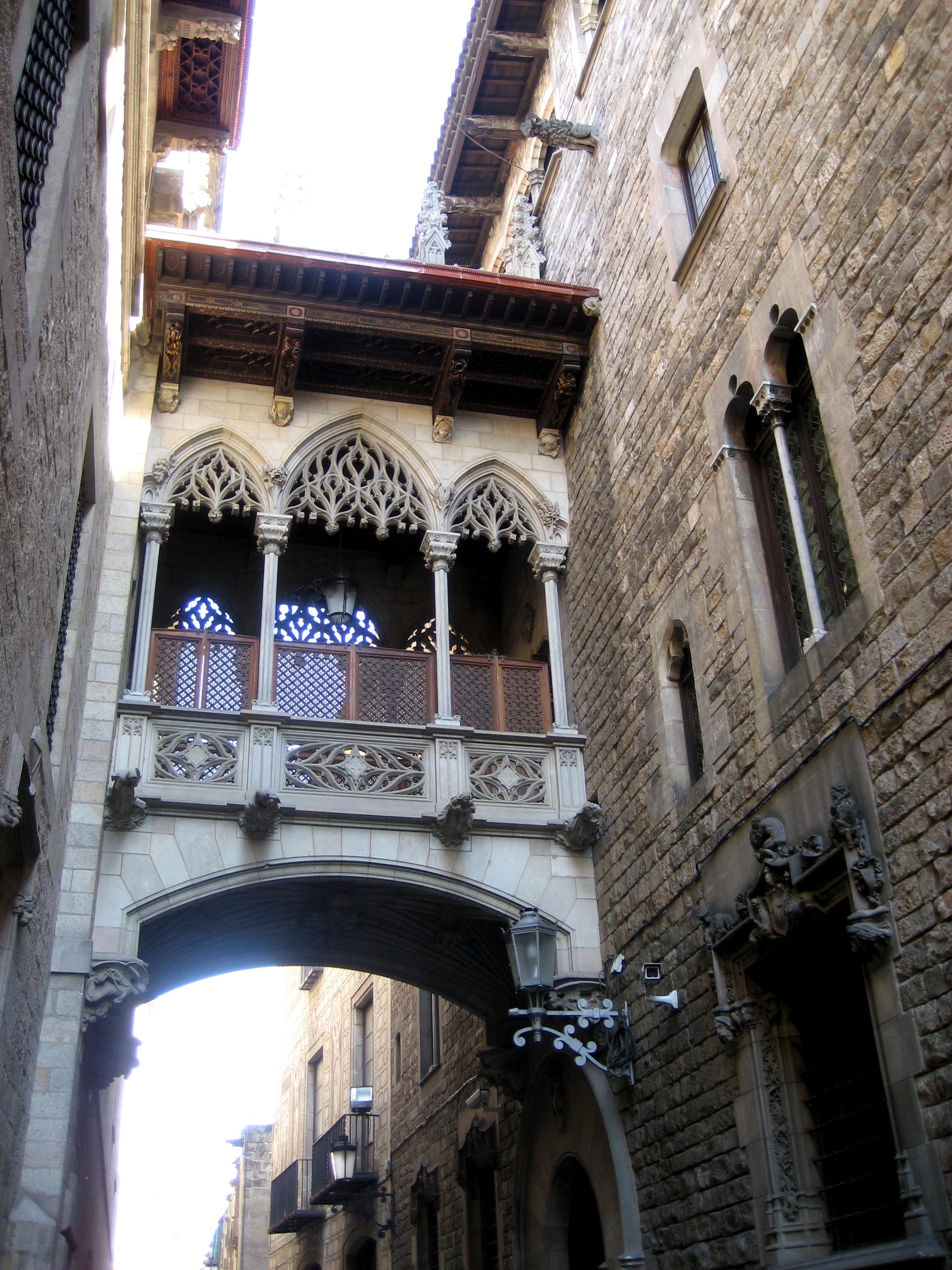
Bridge over the Carrer del Bisbe by Joan Rubió

After the War of Spanish Succession and the Nueva Planta Decree in 1716, the Royal Audience established its headquarters at the Palau, without taking much account of the rich architecture of the building. Partitions were built to divide the various services of the Audiencia. Later, in the 19th century, the architect Miquel Garriga i Roca was commissioned to do some building repairs, mainly on the façade on the Carrer de Sant Honorat and the Gothic gallery. Between the second and fourth decade of the twentieth century, under the direction of the architect Josep Puig i Cadafalch in collaboration with Josep Borí and Joan Rubió i Bellver, another great restoration was carried out to recover the original features and spaces. Also, some new neo-Gothic creations were added, such as the famous bridge over Carrer del Bisbe that links the palace with the Casa dels Canonges (which opened on April 23, 1928) and a project to build a large fireplace in alabaster for the Board of the Presidency, made by the sculptor Josep M. i Camps Arnau, later transferred to the Maricel Museum in Sitges in 1935.

=== First building ===
In the beginning the meetings of the Generalitat, or "Diputació del General" did not have their own building, so they took place in the monastery of Saint Francis. Subsequently, and as the Generalitat's role gained importance, they decided to obtain their own building and finally, on 3 December 1400, their representatives, Alfons de Tous, Jaume Marc and Ramón Desplà, acquired Pere Brunet's house on the Carrer de Sant Honorat for 38,500 sous. This consisted of a small space with a façade on the Carrer de Sant Francesc, a central courtyard, another space closer to Carrer del Bisbe and a small orchard. This building gave onto Carrer Sant Honorat. On the Sant Honrat façade there was and is doorway with a semi-circular arch, over the centre of which the figure of a beadle is sculpted, and six three-lights windows divided by columns. On the first floor are two rooms that still exist, the Council Chamber for the meetings of the deputies and the Chamber of the Judges.

In the central courtyard there was already a staircase in the same location as the present one, but simpler, with three arcaded galleries on the first floor and lofts above them. Located in the small building near the Carrer del Bisbe, there was an archive.

=== Present day ===
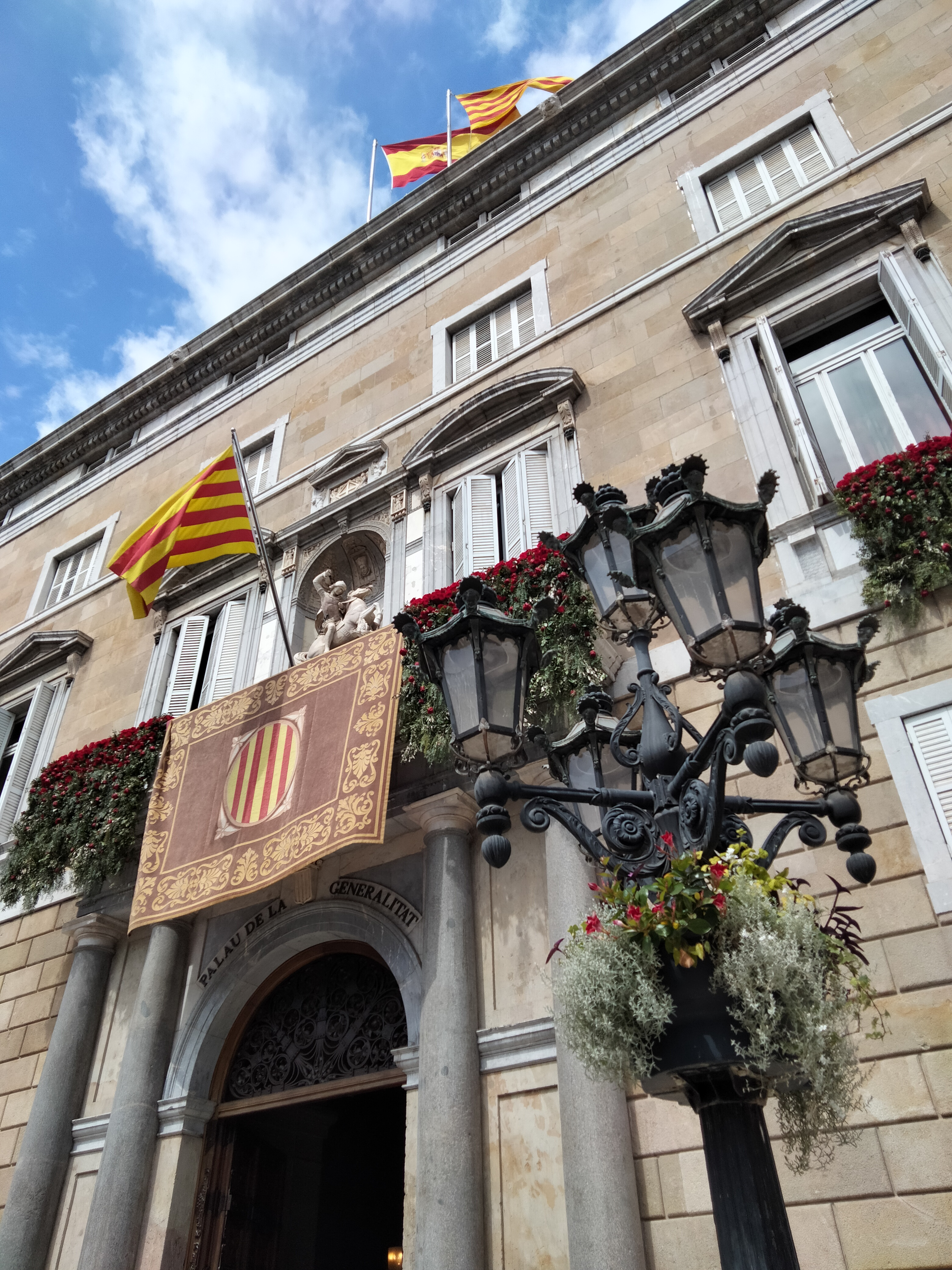
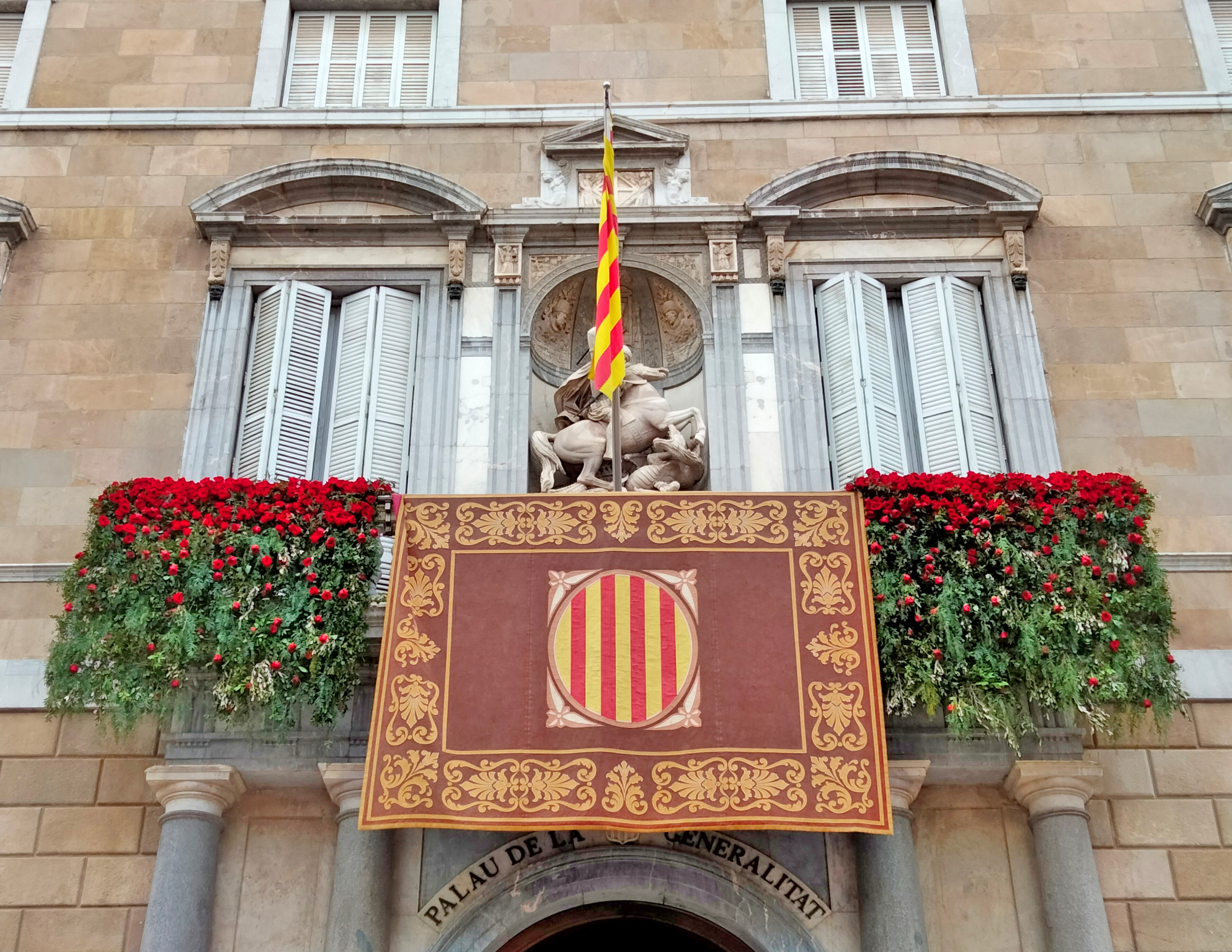
Balcony decoration on Saint George's Day

The Palau de la Generalitat is one of the Catalonia's most valued symbols, among other reasons because it has managed to survive so many historical and political disasters. Also, it has come to represent, along with the Palau del Parlament, a bastion of democracy in Catalonia.

== Gallery ==
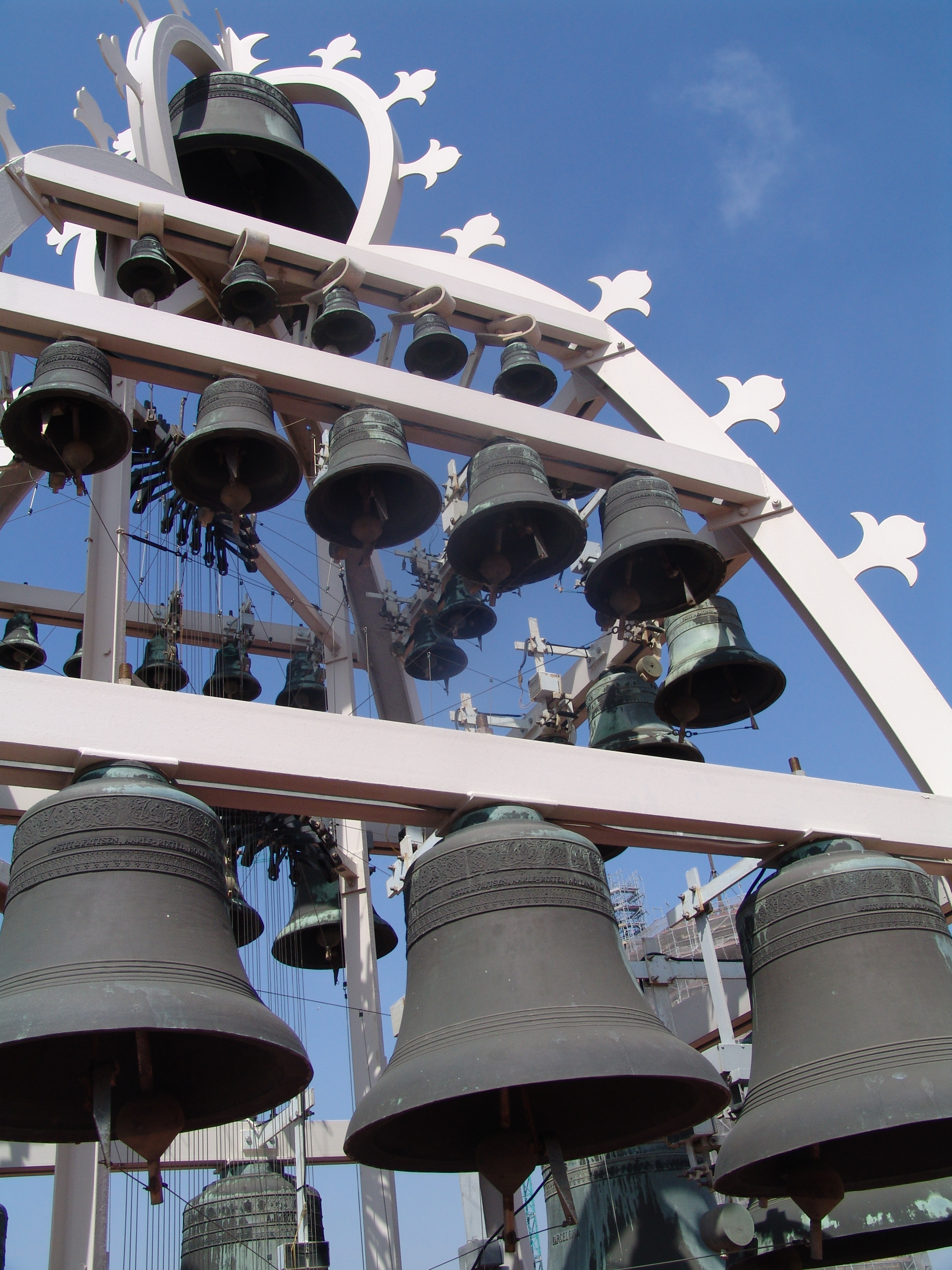
Carillon

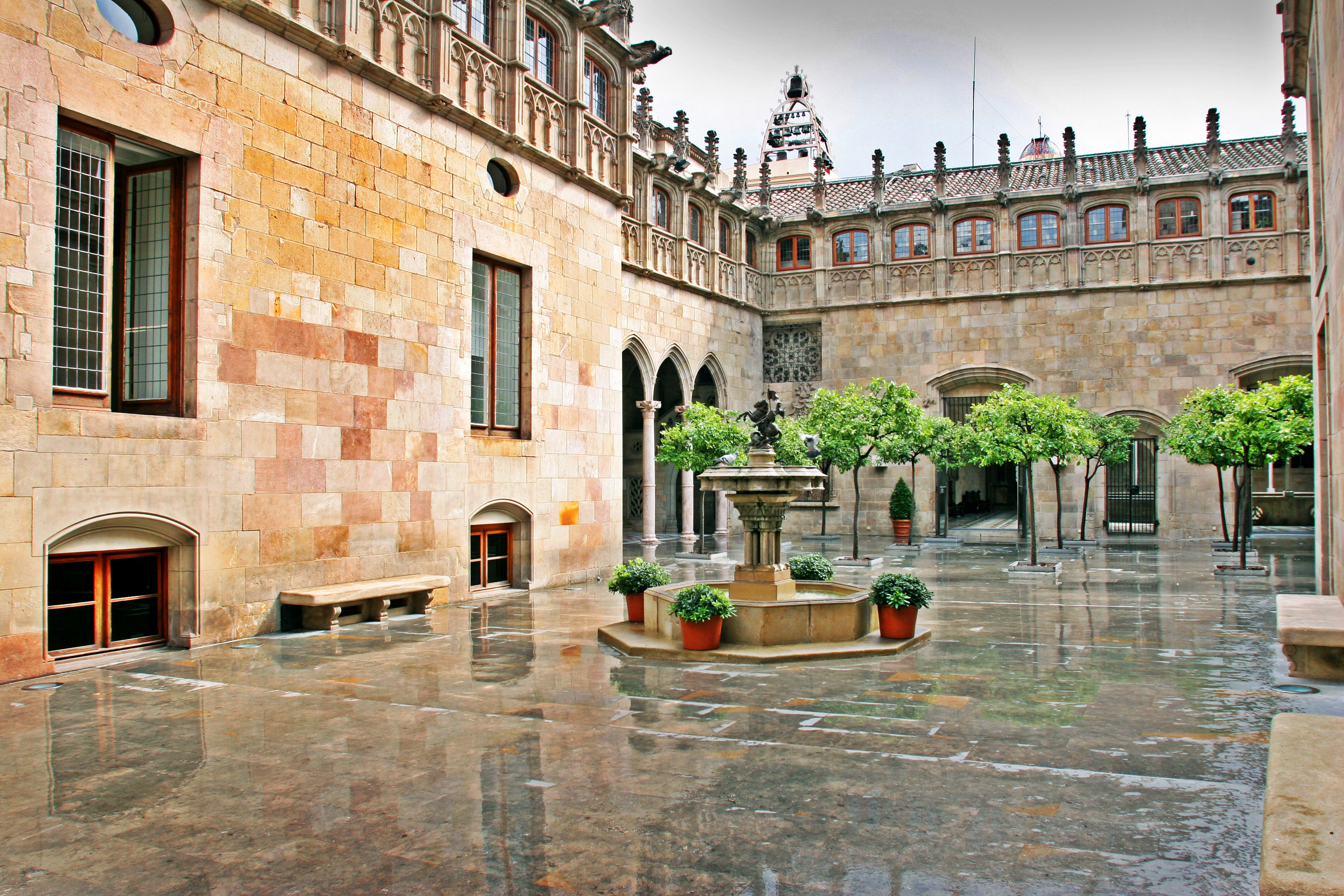
Courtyard of the orange trees (Pati dels Tarongers)

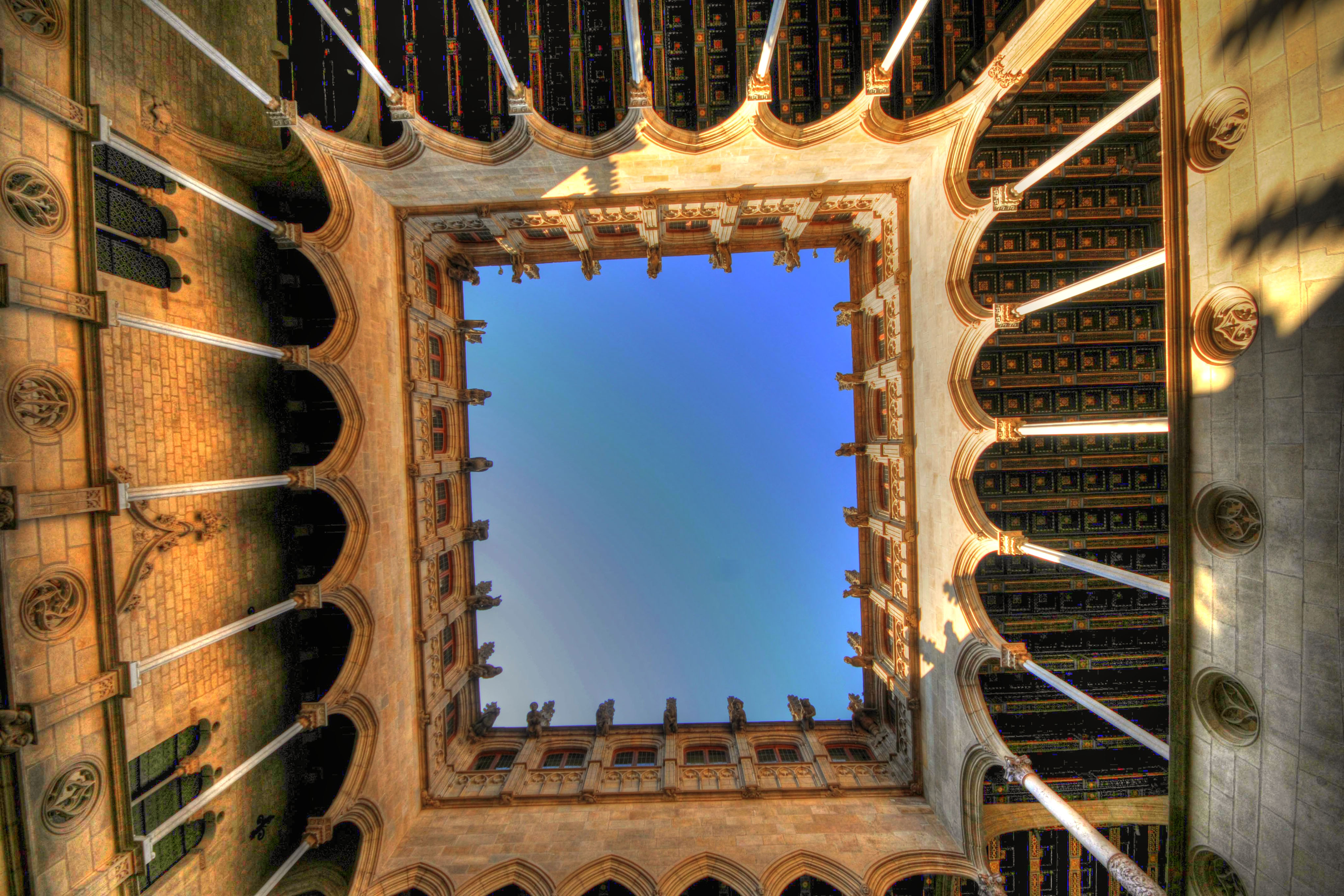
Inner courtyard

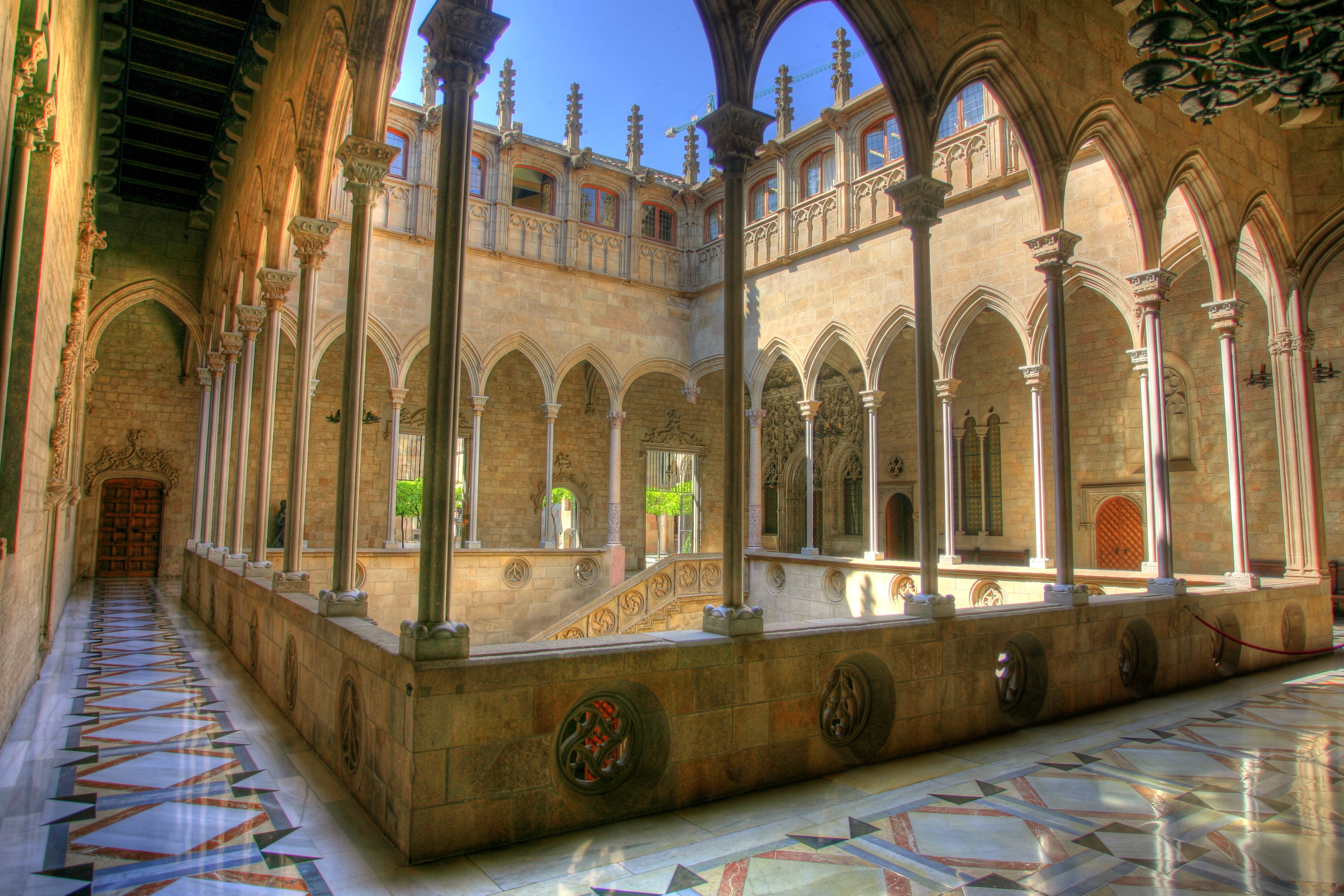
Gothic gallery and inner courtyard

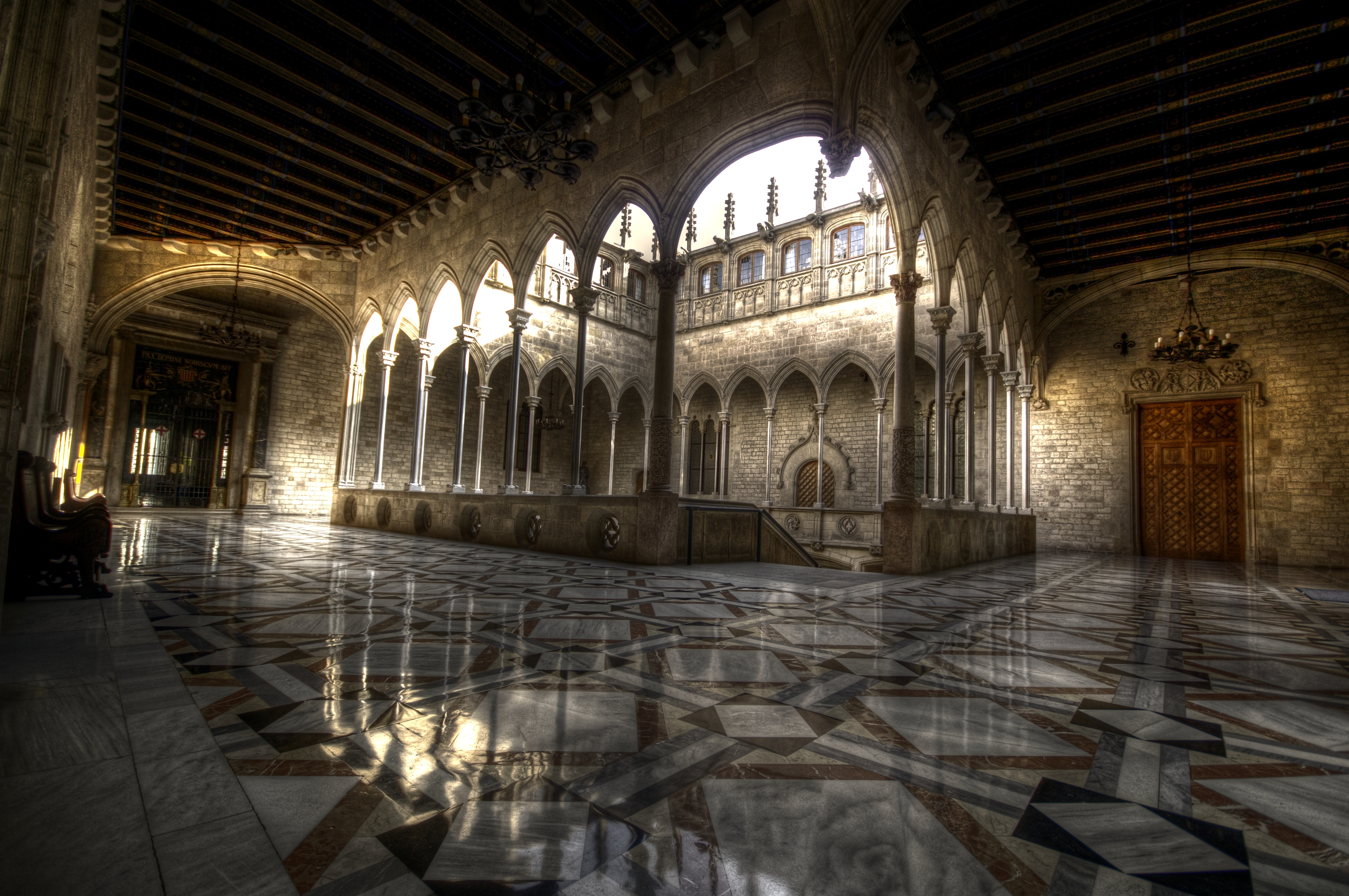
Main view of the Gothic gallery

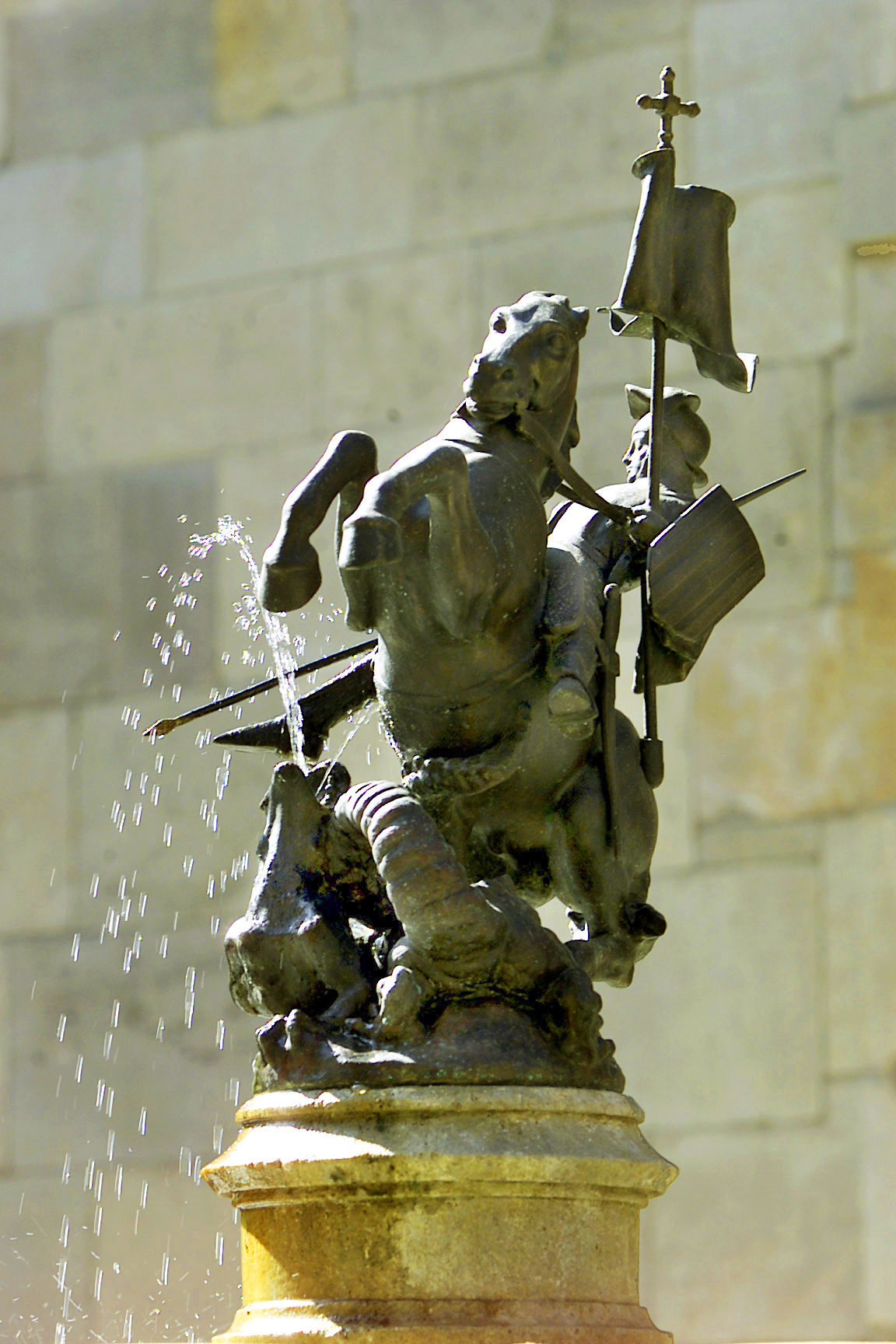
Saint George and the dragon sculpture

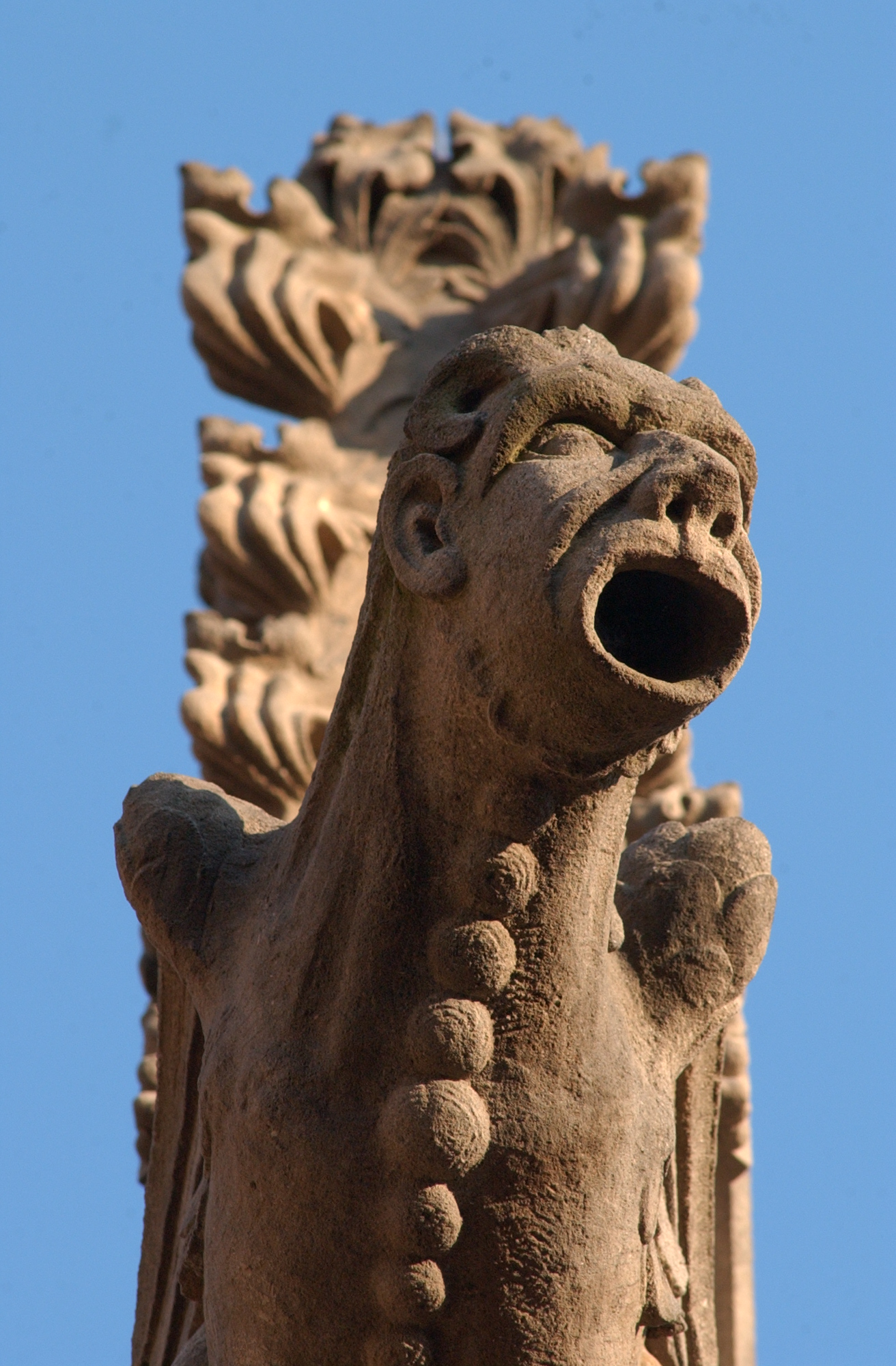
Gargoyle

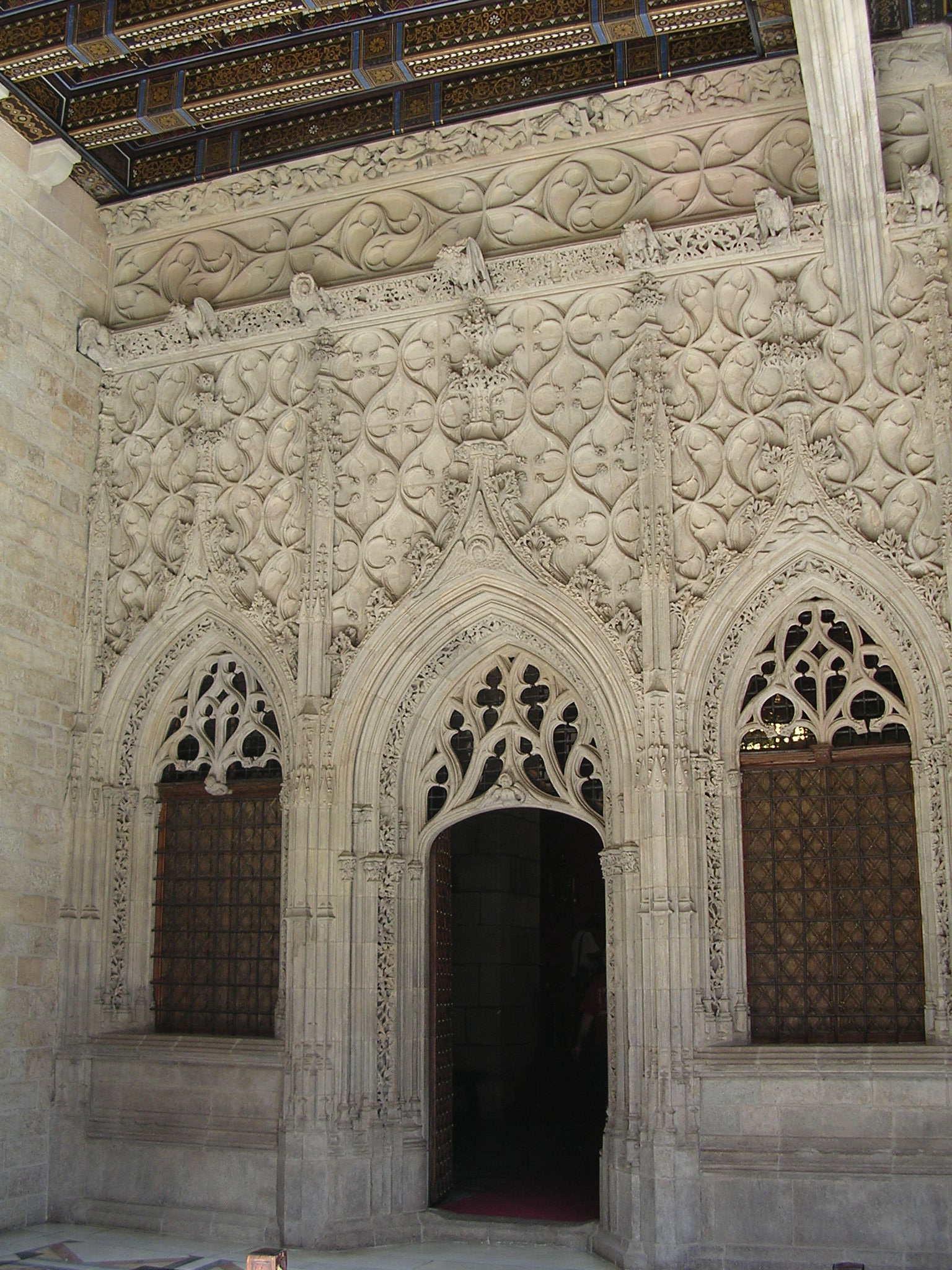
Capella de Sant Jordi

== See also ==
- List of carillons
- Palace of the Generalitat Valenciana
