= Jordi (bishop of Vic) =

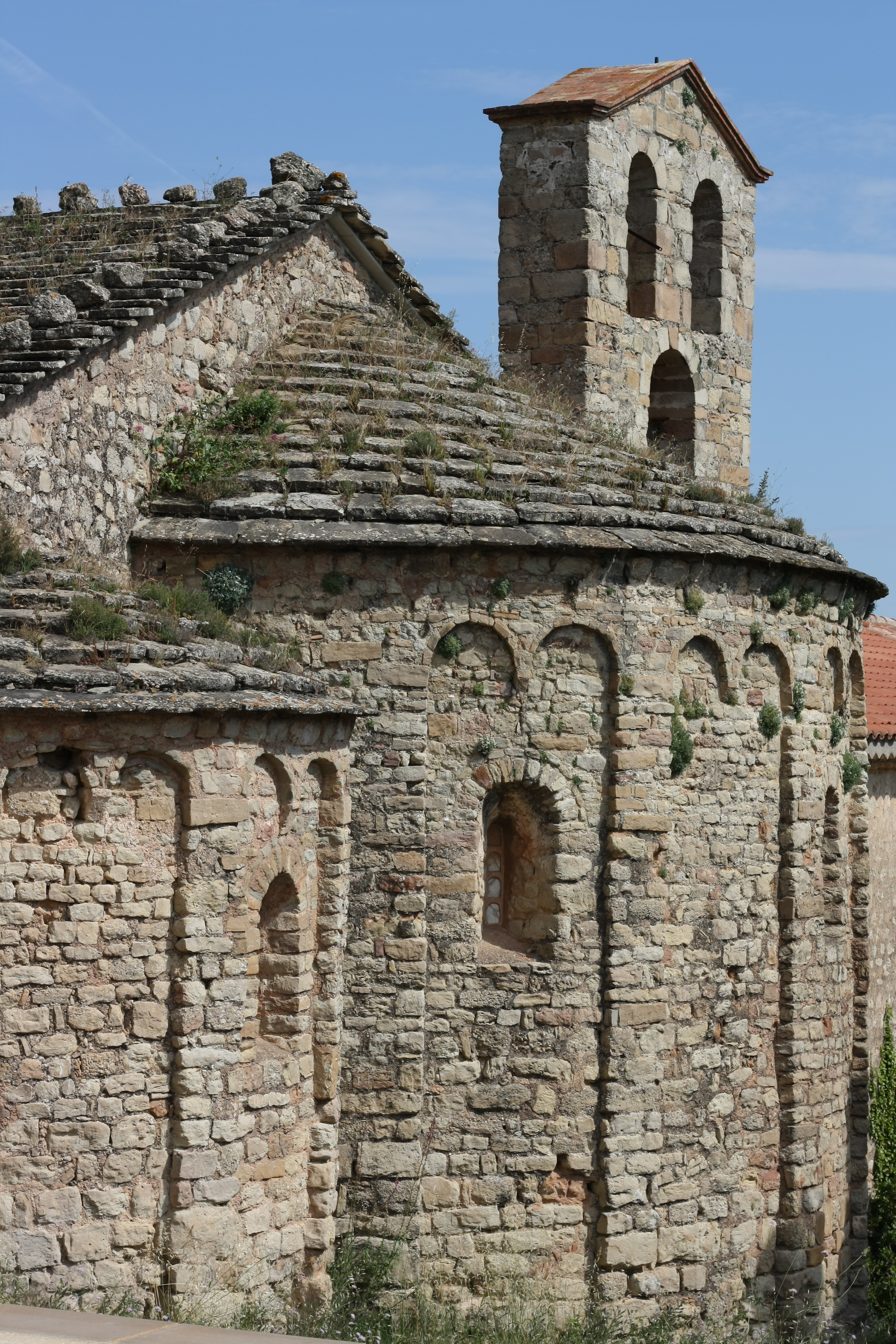
Early Romanesque church at Montserrat: the foundation was approved by bishop Jordi

Jordi (Latin: Georgius, George; died 947) was the bishop of Vic (Ausona) from 914 until his death. After the death of bishop Idalguer, the clergy and people (plebs) of Vic acclaimed as bishop Jordi, whom they described as "noble, prudent, sober and chaste". His election was confirmed on 17 June 914.

In 935, he consecrated the second monastery of Santa Maria de Ripoll under abbot Ennego. In 945, he confirmed the foundation of the monastery of Santa Cecília de Montserrat under abbot Cesari and the rule of Saint Benedict, but retained episcopal control over it. He also consecrated the church of Santa Maria de Manresa around 937.

During his episcopate, Jordi expanded the property holdings of the diocese. On 3 August 915, a certain Leupardus (Llopart) (Note: Names in parentheses are modern Catalanised forms of the recorded Latin.) donated some land in Felporc to Vic for the sake of his soul and that of his wife, Gaudesinda (Godesenda). On 28 February 919, Jordi purchased a vineyard at Seva from Ferminus (Fermí) and his wife, Eldogiva (El·lovija). On 17 July 918 the diocese was the recipient of half of a vineyard at Fontcoberta from one Ferruç. In the town of Vic itself Jordi received an allodial grant on 21 October 921. In 925, Jordi donated the churches of Sant Martí de Vinyoles and Sant Sadurní de Sovelles to the monastery of Ripoll. In separate transactions on 11 November 941 and 19 November 942, Jordi purchased two halves of a vineyard at Sevedà for thirty solidi each. He was the first bishop of Vic to organise an ecclesiastical structure in the region of the Moianès.
