= Alfons de Tous =

12th President of the Deputation of the General of Catalonia
- In office 1396–1413
- Preceded by: Miquel de Santjoan
- Succeeded by: Marc de Vilalba

Personal details
- Born: either Principality of Catalonia or Kingdom of Valencia
- Died: 3 February 1421; Vic, Principality of Catalonia
- Bishop of Vic
- See: Vic
- In office: 23 May 1410–1423
- Predecessor: Diego de Heredia
- Successor: Miquel de Navés
- Other post(s): Bishop of Perpinyà–Elna (1409–1410)

Alfons de Tous was President of the Generalitat of Catalonia 1396-1413, succeeding Miquel de Santjoan when the latter left the Principality of Catalonia in 1396 to become a royal ambassador.

During the Western Schism, he aligned with the Antipope Benedict XIII and the revived line of Avignon popes, and continued that support until the Council of Constance, when Ferdinand I of Aragon withdrew his support for Avignon, at which point Alfons tried unsuccessfully to convince Benedict to voluntarily renounce his claim to the papacy.

Alfons began his ecclesiastical career as the rector of the church of Sant Mateu (Saint Matthew) in Tortosa. He next served the Benedict XIII as his ambassador to the Kingdom of Castile, and later became rector of the Church of Santa Maria del Pi in Barcelona, from which position he was appointed a deputy to the Catalan Courts held in Barcelona, the Catalan parliament. On December 3, 1400, as president of the Corts of Barcelona, he purchased the original portion of what then became the Palau de la Generalitat de Catalunya for 38,500 sous. Alfons became the first president of the Generalitat of Catalonia to live there.

Subsequently to serving at Santa Maria del Pi, he became a canon of the Cathedral of Barcelona and, eventually, auditor of the Pia Almoina, the charitable fund of the cathedral. In 1408 King Martin of Aragon ("Martin the Humane") proposed him as bishop of Barcelona, but the Pope named Francesc de Blanes instead. Martin successfully exerted pressure to have him named bishop of Elne; in 1410, he was transferred to serve as bishop at Vic, where in 1417 he decreed that every parish must maintain a register of baptisms.

His activities in the role of ecclesiastical deputy to the Generalitat required that he take part in the parliamentary discussion of the succession after Martin's death in 1410. The new king Ferdinand I was from the House of Trastámara, which already ruled Castile, so his selection as king brought Aragon and Castile under the same dynastic house. Subsequently, Alfons presided over the Corts of Montblanc (1414). In both of these parliamentary assemblies as well as in the Corts of Sant Cugat-Tortosa (1419), he tried, with little success, to influence the new Trastámara king to continue the policies of the earlier line of Aragonese monarchs of the House of Barcelona.

Preceded by Miquel de Santjoan	President of the Government of Catalonia; 1396-1413	Succeeded by Marc de Villalba
Preceded by Diego de Heredia	Bishop of Vic; 1410–1423	Succeeded by Miquel de Navés
