= Sant Esteve, Balsareny =

Sant Esteve
- Singular population entity
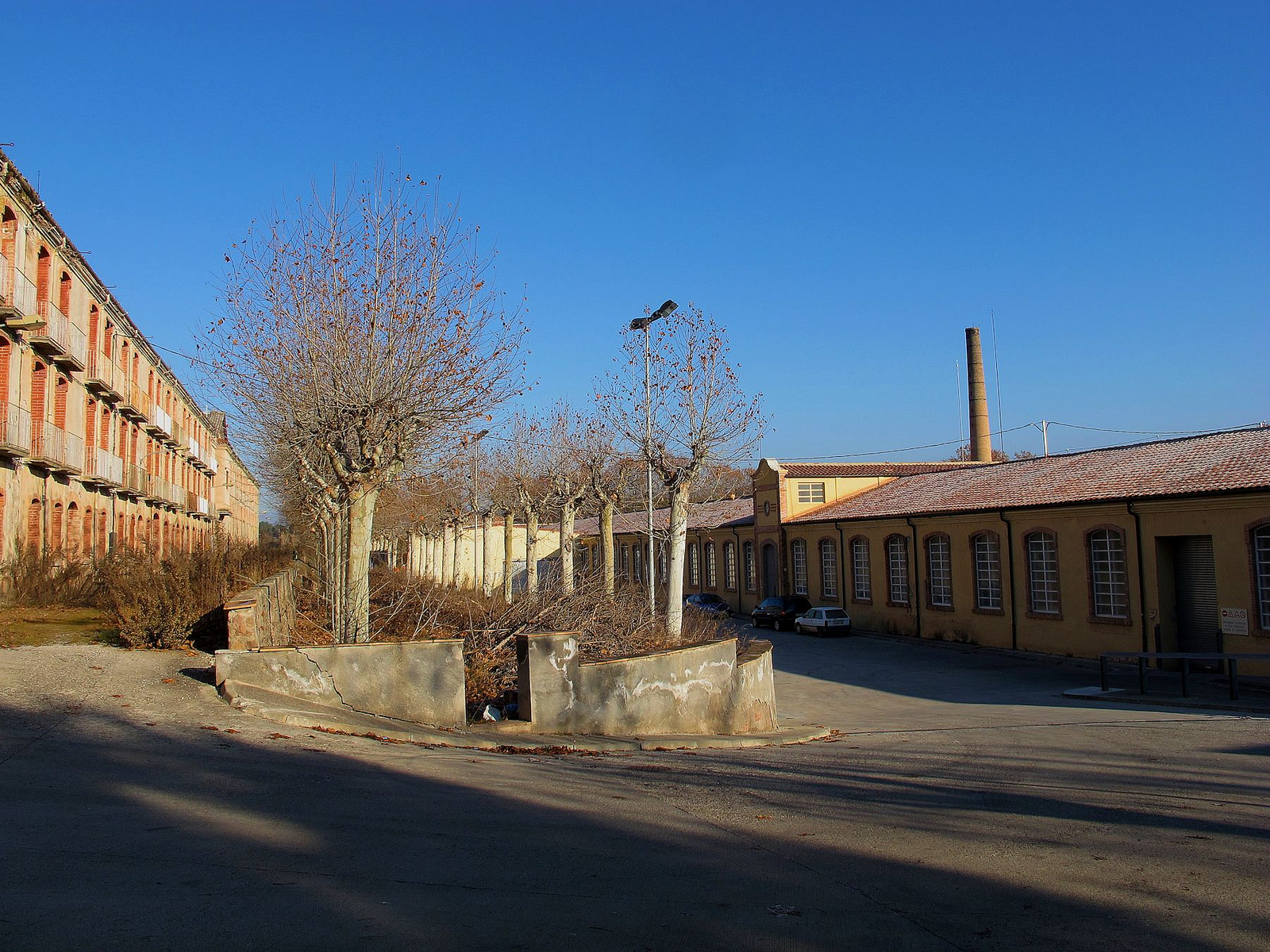
- Colònia Soldevila (Balsareny)

- Location within Spain Location within Catalonia Location within Province of Barcelona
- Coordinates: 41°53′03.6″N 1°53′10.6″E
- Country: Spain
- A. community: Catalunya
- Province: Barcelona
- Municipality: Balsareny

Population (January 1, 2024)
  - Total: 0
- Time zone: UTC+01:00
- Postal code: 08660
- MCN: 08191000400
- Website: Official website

Sant Esteve is a singular population entity in the municipality of Balsareny, in Catalonia, Spain.

As of 2024 it has a population of 0 people.
