= Santa Cecília de Montserrat =

Benedictine monastery in Marganell, Catalonia, Spain

Coordinates: 41.611511°N 1.817064°E

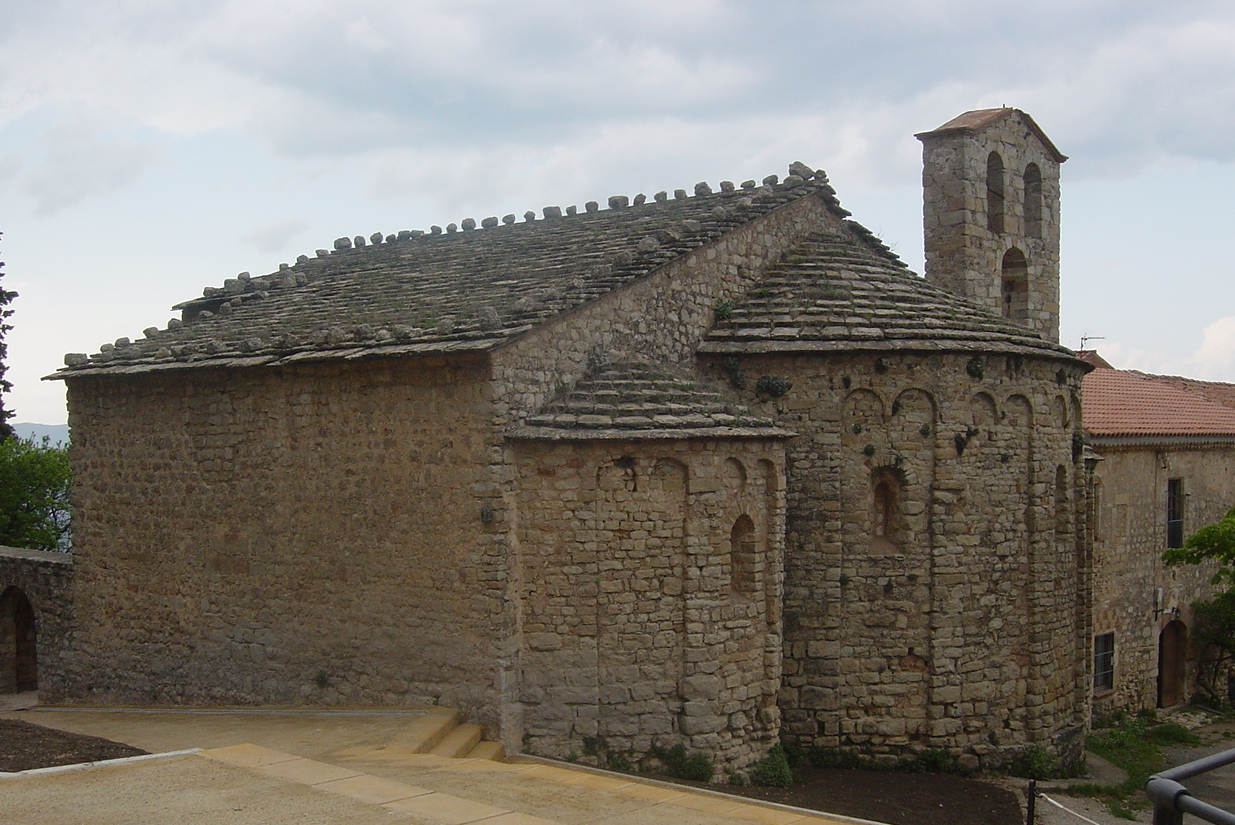
Santa Cecília de Montserrat

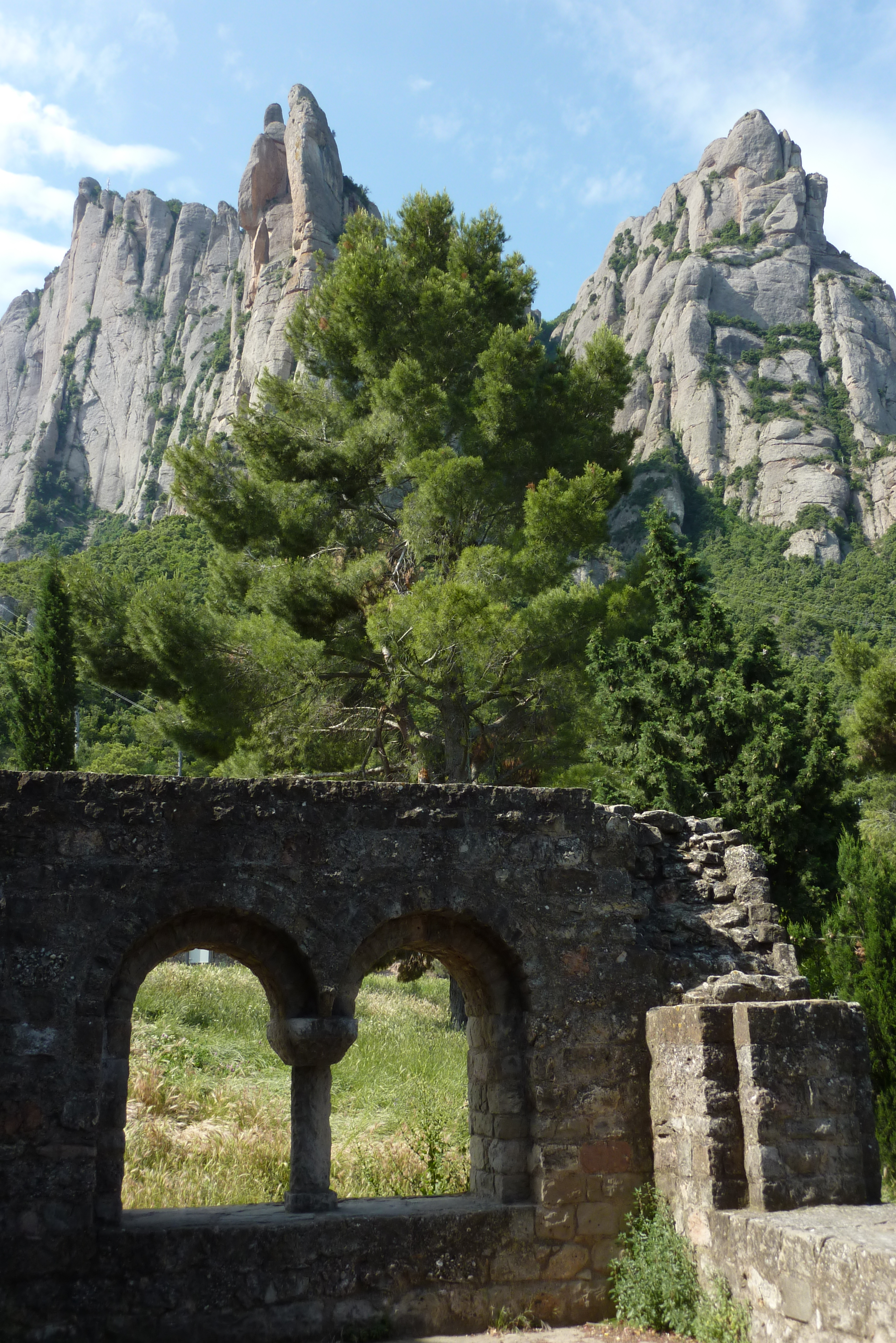
Exterior arches

Santa Cecília de Montserrat is a Benedictine monastery in Marganell, Catalonia, Spain.

== History ==
The monastery was founded by its first abbot, Cesari, who was sponsored by Sunyer, Count of Barcelona and his wife Riquilda de Tolosa. In 945, Jordi, Bishop of Vic, authorized the formation of a monastery to be governed by the Rule of St. Benedict, with the monastery falling under the bishop's control. After the death of Cesari, the Abbot Oliva tried to annex the monastery, but met with opposition from the monks of the community. The monastery served as a place of refuge for pilgrims traveling to Montserrat. In the 15th century, it began to decline and in 1539, it was attached to Santa Maria de Montserrat Abbey.

The building was looted and burned by French troops in 1811 and 1812. The Abbot of Montserrat, Miquel Muntadas, ordered its reconstruction in 1862. Until in 1940, it served a community of Benedictine nuns; it was associated with the monastery of Sant Pere de les Puelles. In 1954 the nuns moved to a new monastery, Sant Benet, and since then the building has operated as a refuge for hikers and as a meeting center.

== Architecture and fittings ==
The old monastery was of Romanesque style. There are three apses and two semicircular arches. There have been several renovations, the last carried out between 1928 and 1931 to a design by the architect Josep Puig i Cadafalch.

== Bibliography ==
- Pladevall, Antoni: Els monestirs catalans, Ediciones Destino, Barcelona, 1970 ISBN 8423305112 (in Spanish)
