= Sant Salvador, Breda =

Church

Coordinates: 41.748453°N 2.5571°E

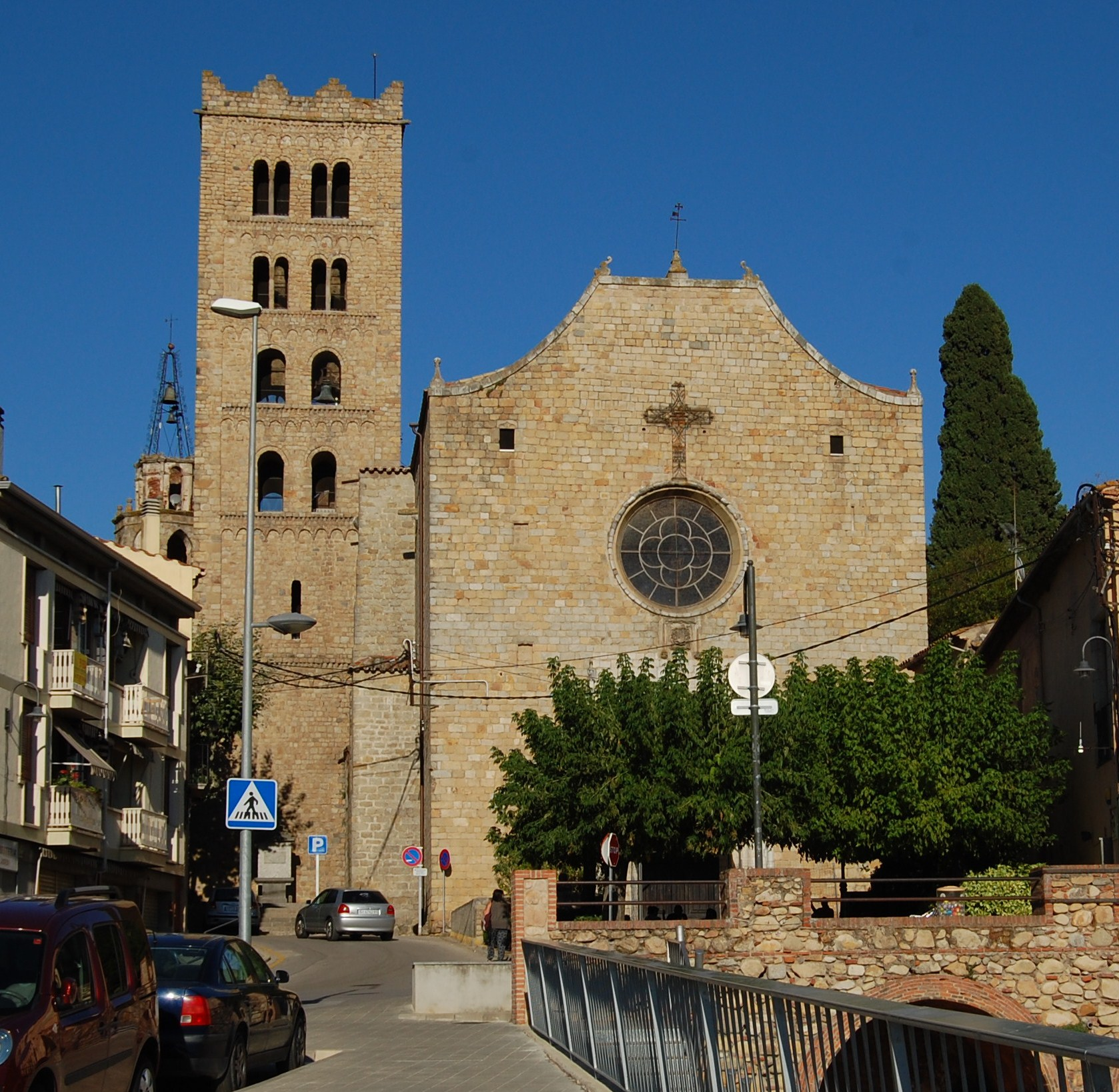
Sant Salvador de Breda

Sant Salvador de Breda is a parish church and former Benedictine monastery in Breda, Province of Girona, Catalonia, Spain.

== History ==
Sant Salvador was founded in 1038 by Viscounts of Cabrera, lords of Montsoriu Castle. The first brick was laid down by Sunyer (1038-1067), with the building being complete a year after his death. In 1098, under an edict by Pope Urban II, the monastery was a part of Sant Cugat del Vallès municipality. In 14th century, another parish, Miquel Samsó (1461-1507), was constructed. During the Peninsular War, the monastery was looted by the French army. Following secularization between 1820 and 1823, the church inhabitants left the premises in 1835. A few relics that survived the burning of July 1936 are stored at the church. In 1938, the place was converted into a gasoline depot, and a year later Franco's troops under the command of Enrique Líster set it ablaze. Other artifacts church possesses include a sepulchral relief of Ferran de Joara and Timbor de Cabrera dating to the beginning of the 16th century.

A renovation was completed in 2016 with another one in 2020.

The building is in the register of the protected sites by the Bé Cultural d’Interès Nacional since 1974.

== Architecture and fittings ==
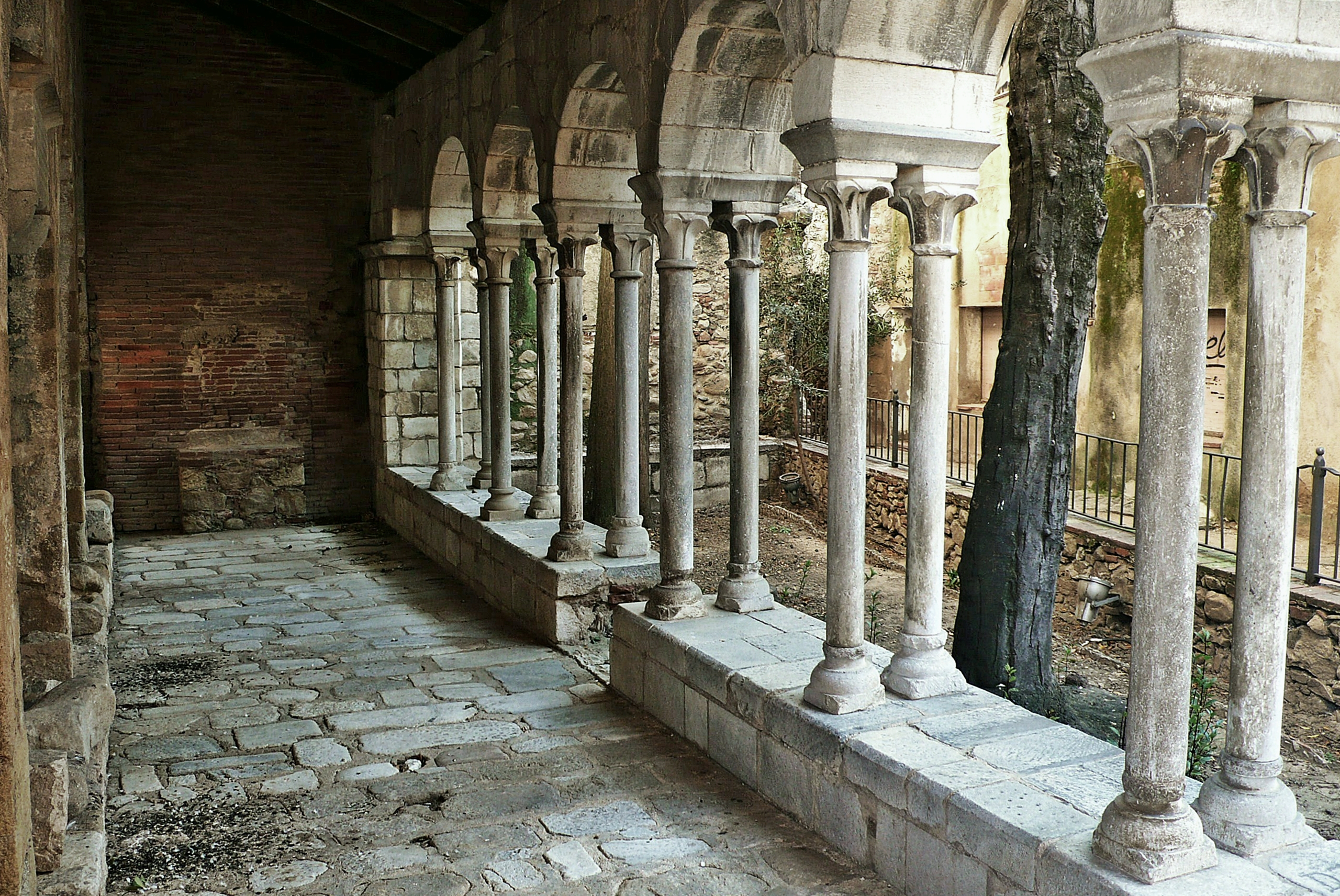
Cloister

Very little of the original Romanesque architecture remains. The 11th-12th century bell tower, reconstructed later, is the best preserved building. It is a slender tower, 32 metres (105 ft) in height, and rectangular in shape. It consists of five floors with windows in the top four.

The Gothic-style church, built between the 14th and 16th centuries, serves as parish church. It has a late Romanesque cloister which was partially destroyed in 1877. Annexed to the cloister is an ancient abbey house with large patio windows and Gothic arches. The tombs of the nobles who were buried in the monastery were desecrated and plundered; little remains of them.

The adjoining church of Santa Maria is now a municipal museum.

In 2023, the interior and exterior façades of the south, east and west wings of the cloister walls were studied. The study revealed original architectural elements that date to the initial construction of the cenobi.
