= Sant Esteve, Banyoles =

Benedictine monastery in Banyoles, Pla de l'Estany, Catalonia, Spain

Coordinates: 42.120556°N 2.769444°E

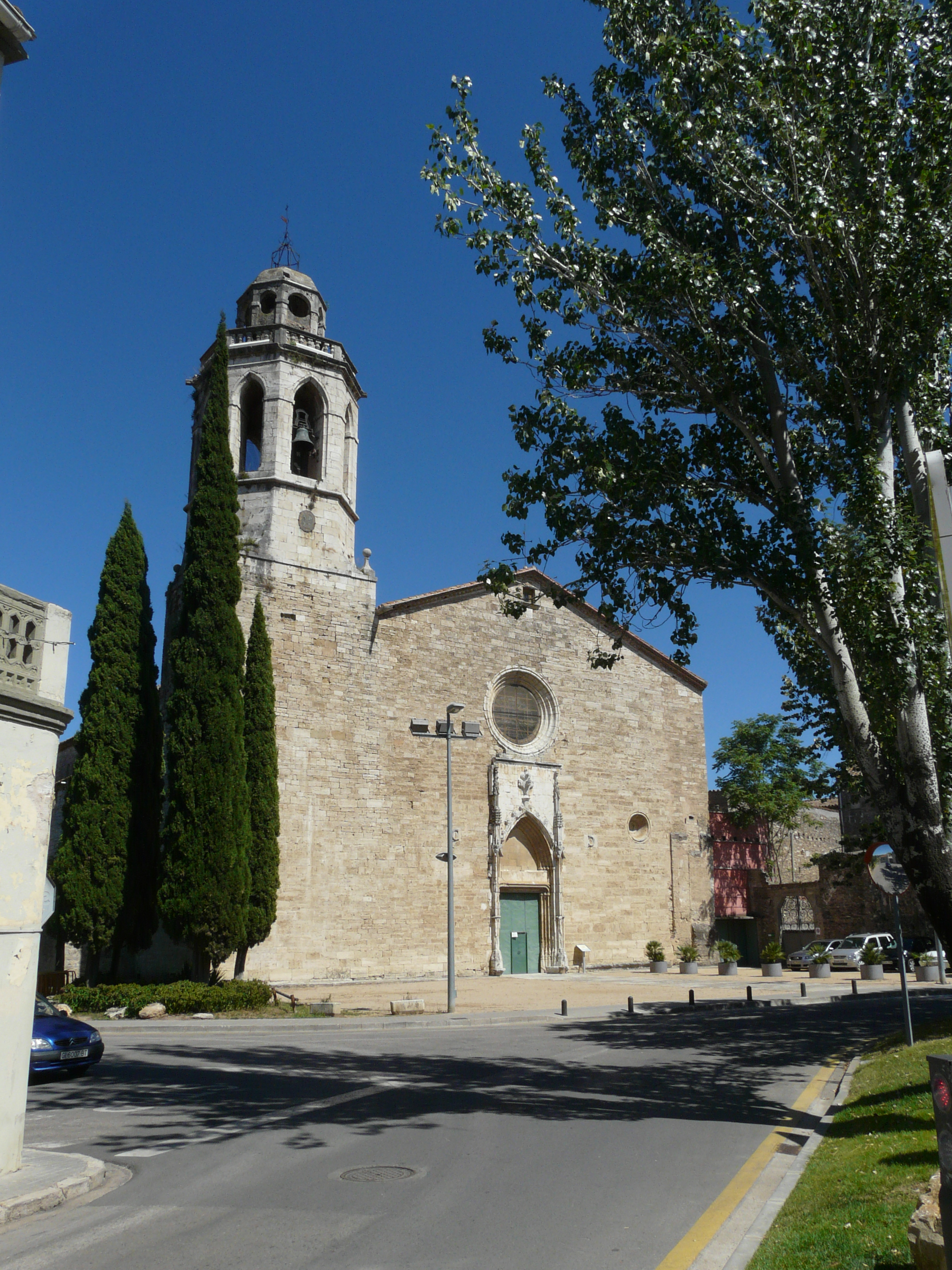
Sant Esteve de Banyoles

Sant Esteve de Banyoles is a Benedictine monastery in Banyoles, Pla de l'Estany, Catalonia, Spain. It was declared as a Bé Cultural d'Interès Nacional landmark in 1973. The monastery was founded before 812.

== History ==
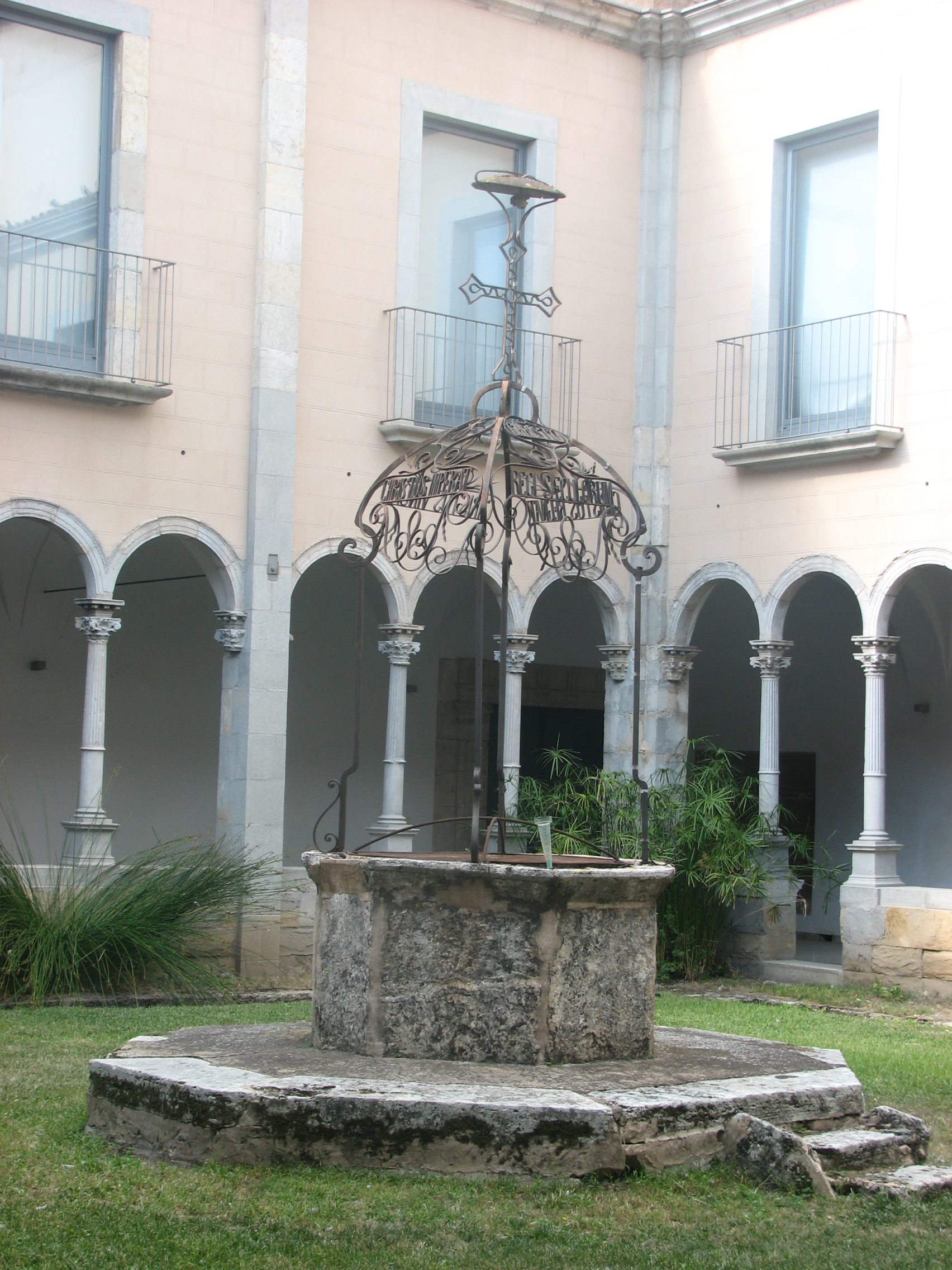
Cloister

The monastery was founded before 812. The first record of a document written in the monastery is dated 822 by the abbot, Bonitus. Bonitus' successor was Abbot Mercoral. The first inhabitants of Banyoles settled around the monastery and remained for centuries under the feudal power of the abbot. The buildings of the monastery were destroyed several times throughout its history. The architectural group that has survived is a mixture of styles, the product of different construction period.

In the 10th century, the first church of the monastery was destroyed after being attacked by Saracen troops. In 957, the bishop of Girona, Arnulf, dedicated a new temple, with three apses. In the 11th century, Sant Esteve was again destroyed, and then rebuilt, with a new consecration in 1086.

The whole building was also affected by the earthquake that devastated the area in 1427 and 1428. In 1655, the bell tower and the cloister were destroyed. In the 17th century, restoration work occurred. Between 1692 and 1699, a new steeple was built.

== Architecture and fittings ==
The building's first documented cloister is dated 1086 and was in Romanesque style. The nave includes a triple apse. The front entrance, built in the 16th century, is in late Gothic style, while the rest of the building is of 17th-century Neoclassical style. Other buildings mentioned are the refectory, dormitory, chapter house, monks' housing, cellar, barn, and kitchen. During the cloister restoration, completed in 2003, remains of Romanesque capitals were found. They are valued for their historical importance, dated to the 11th century, with paintings of the late Gothic period.

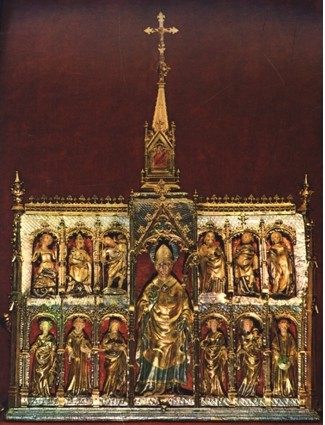
Arqueta de Sant Martirià

Arqueta de Sant Martirià (Casket of Saint Martirià) is considered one of the most prominent goldsmithing elements of Girona. It is 15th-century Gothic and contains the remains of Sant Martirià, patron of the city. The cypress wood box is coated with silver and shaped as a Gothic church, surrounded by seven figures which are also silver-coated.

Altar of Our Lady of Scale is a preserved mid-15th-century piece attributed to teacher Joan Antigó. In the center of the altar, there is a 15th-century Gothic sculpture, Verge de l'Escala.

The Baroque organ, built in the 18th century, is located in the lobby.

== Bibliography ==
Elisabeth Oliva, et alt. 2005. El patrimoni del Pla de l'Estany. Inventari històric i arquitectònic de la comarca. Consell Comarcal del Pla de l'Estany (ed.), p. 152.
