= Marganell =

- Municipality
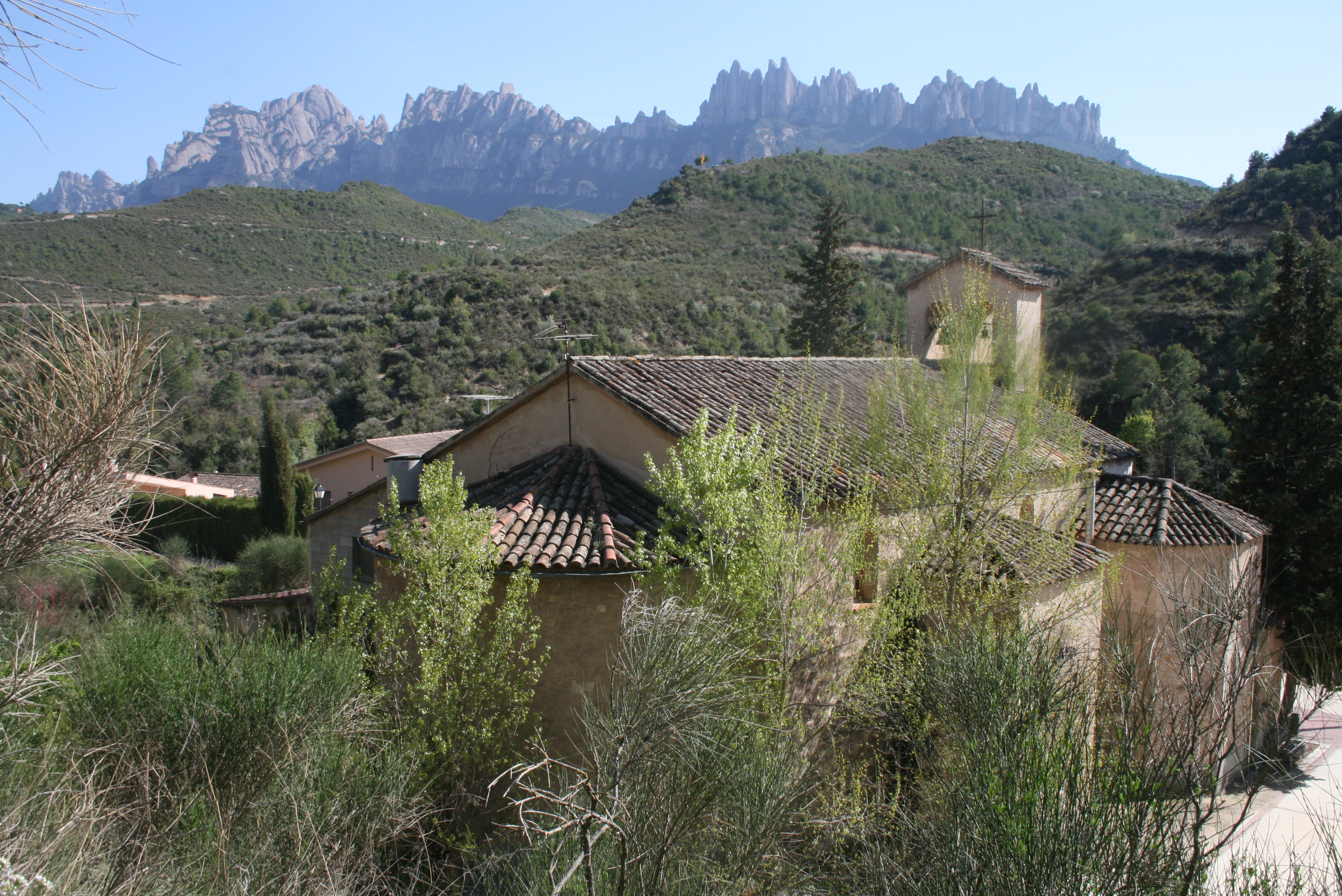
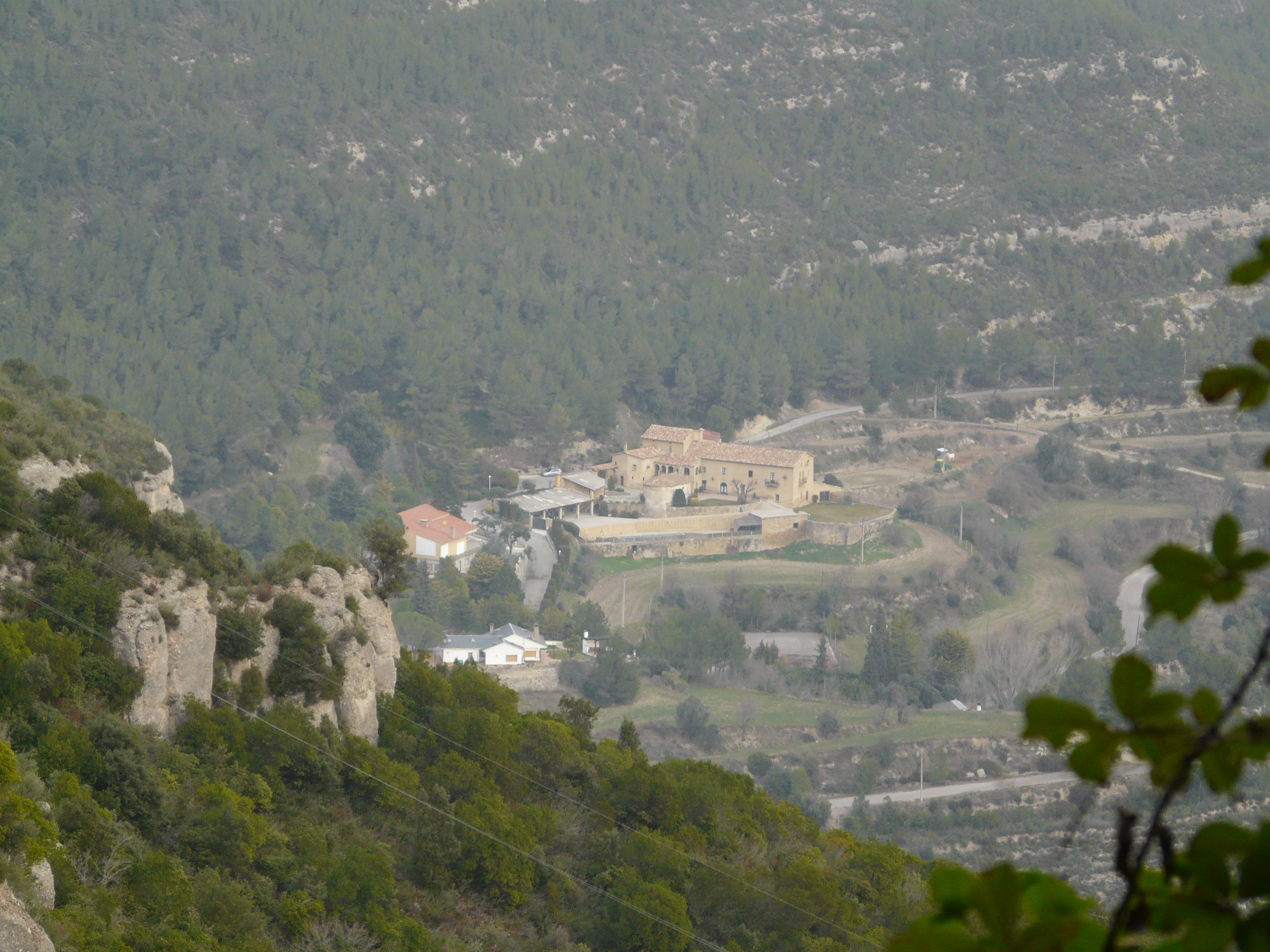
- St. Stephen's church, Marganell, with Montserrat behind

- Coat of arms

- Location in Catalonia Marganell (Spain)
- Coordinates: 41°38′24.00″N 1°47′38.40″E
- Country: Spain
- Community: Catalonia
- Province: Barcelona
- Comarca: Bages

Government
  - Mayor: Anna Garcia Ventura (2015)

Area
  - Total: 13.5 km^{2} (5.2 sq mi)
- Elevation: 291 m (955 ft)

Population (2025-01-01)
  - Total: 309
  - Density: 22.9/km^{2} (59.3/sq mi)
- Demonym(s): Marganellès, marganellesa
- Website: marganell.cat

Marganell (Catalan pronunciation: [məɾɣəˈneʎ]) is a municipality in the comarca of the Bages in Catalonia, Spain. It is situated on the northern slopes of Montserrat, and is also known as Santa Cecília de Montserrat (Catalan: [ˈsantə səˈsiliə ðə munsəˈrat]) in reference to the Benedictine monasteries (See Santa Cecília de Montserrat and Montserrat monastery). The agriculture in the municipality is mostly of cereals, and the majority of the active population works elsewhere (until recently, in the cotton mills of Castellbell i el Vilar).

== Demography ==
| 1900 | 1930 | 1950 | 1970 | 1986 | 2014 |
|---|---|---|---|---|---|
| 233 | 267 | 275 | 240 | 217 | 297 |
