= Marta Ferrusola =

Spanish Catalan businesswoman (1935–2024)

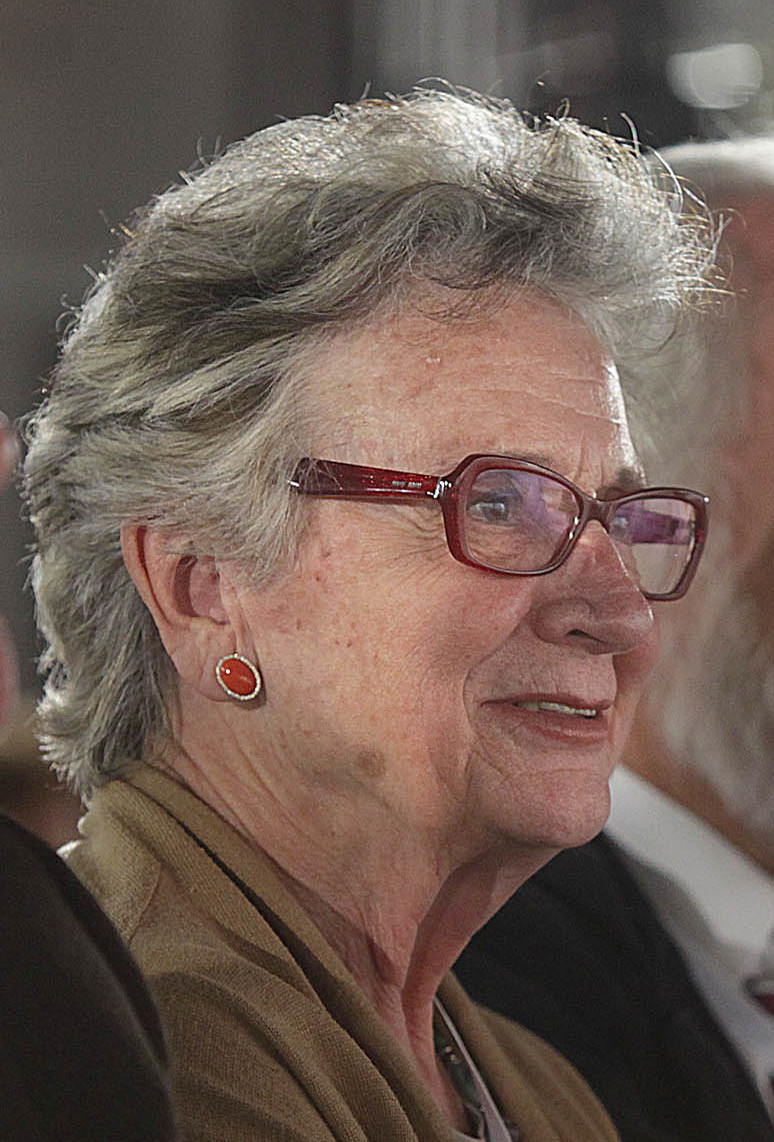
- Marta Ferrusola in 2012

Spouse of the President of the Government of Catalonia
- In office 8 May 1980 – 20 December 2003
- Monarch: Juan Carlos I
- Preceded by: Antònia Macià i Gómez
- Succeeded by: Diana Garrigosa

Personal details
- Born: 28 June 1935 Barcelona, Spain
- Died: 8 July 2024 (aged 89) Barcelona, Spain
- Spouse: Jordi Pujol (m. 1956)
- Children: 7
- Occupation: Businesswoman

Marta Ferrusola i Lladós (28 June 1935 – 8 July 2024) was a Spanish Catalan businesswoman, political figure, wife of former President of the Generalitat de Catalunya Jordi Pujol, and First Lady of Catalonia from 1980 to 2003. Ferrusola, an ardent advocate for Catalan nationalism and Catholicism, played a highly influential role in both her husband's government and the Democratic Convergence of Catalonia (CDC) political party.

== Biography ==
Ferrusola was born in Barcelona in 1935 to Josep Ferrusola Pascual and Carme Lladós Martí. Her father owned a tailor's shop. She met her future husband, Jordi Pujol, at the Virtèlia School in Barcelona, which was home to the Brotherhood of the Mare de Déu de Montserrat de Virtèlia, a rare center of both Catholicism and Catalan culture during the Franco dictatorship. Ferrusola, who was 18-years-old at the time, was teaching catechism classes with Pujol's sister, Marta Pujol Soley, in the La Guineueta neighborhood of Barcelona. Pujol's sister introduced them. They married on 4 June 1956 at a Catholic ceremony at the Santa Maria de Montserrat Abbey, officiated by the abbot, Aureli Maria Escarré. The couple had seven children: Jordi (born 1958), Marta (1959), Josep (1963), Pere (1965), Oriol (1966), Mireia (1969), and Oleguer (1972).

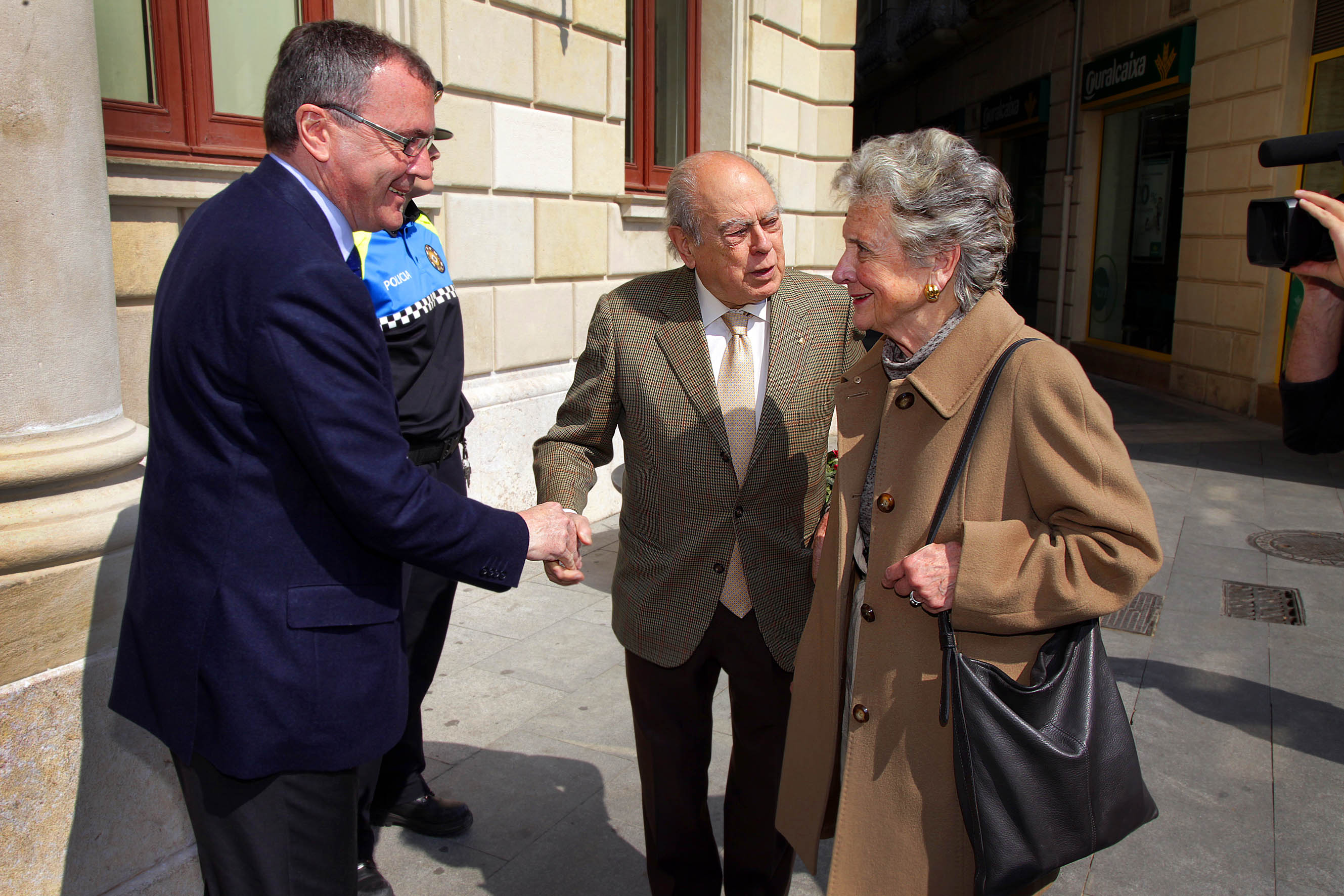
Ferrusola and Jordi Pujol in Reus, 23 March 2012

In 1973, Ferrusola became one of the founding members of the Catalan nationalist party, Democratic Convergence of Catalonia (CDC). She wielded influence within the CDC, both publicly and behind-the-scenes. Officially, she held the position of the head of the party's sports sector. Jordi Pujol became President of the Generalitat de Catalunya in 1980, holding that office until 2003. Ferrusola, as Pujol's wife and a high profile political figure within Catalan nationalist movement, sought to transform the unofficial role of First Lady of Catalonia into a position that closely resembled the first ladies of other, fully sovereign countries.

Ferrusola co-founded Hidroplant SA, a gardening, landscaping and irrigation company, in 1990 with Núria Claverol, the wife of Carles Sumarroca, a close associate of Generalitat de Catalunya President Jordi Pujol. Their clients included Fútbol Club Barcelona and the irrigated green façade of the former Banca Catalana headquarters in Barcelona. Hidroplant's close ties with the Pujol government came under scrutiny after her company was awarded lucrative gardening and landscaping contracts by the office of the President of the Government of Catalonia, the Generalitat de Catalunya, the Port of Barcelona, and four Catalonian government departments, including Department of Economy, and the environmental department during Jordi Pujol's presidency. In 1994, FC Barcelona also awarded Ferrusola's Hidroplant the contract to maintain the grass turf at the Camp Nou stadium. A lawsuit was later filed against Hidroplant in 1995 for failing to maintain the stadium's field after the grass turf had to be replaced due to root damage, which Ferrusola blamed on bad weather.

Marta Ferrusola has been described as conservative, devoutly Catholic, and an ardent Catalan nationalist. Ferrusola had ties to Opus Dei and travelled to the Vatican to attend the canonization of its founder, Josemaría Escrivá, on 6 October 2002. She was a frequent critic of a host of groups, including cohabitating unmarried couples, unmarried women, socialist, gays, and people who live in Catalonia who speak Spanish rather than the Catalan language.

== Judicial prosecution ==
Ferrusola's later years were marked by criminal proceedings against her, her husband, and several of their children for corruption allegations and financial irregularities. Ferrusola had declared her total net worth at €685,099.

However, a Barcelona judge investigating the family's finances found Ferrusola had more than one million euros in a bank in Andorra.

== Health and death ==
Ferrusola was diagnosed with Alzheimer's disease in 2018. In 2020, she suffered serious injuries from a fall at her summer residence in the village of Queralbs and had not appeared in public since the accident. Her Alzheimer's diagnosis was not made public until 2021, when a forensic doctor revealed she suffered from "moderately severe cognitive impairment" during the ongoing court proceedings against the Pujol family. As a result of the doctor's findings, charges against Ferrusola were suspended during the Pujol family's ongoing criminal trial.

Ferrusola died from complications of pneumonia at her home in Barcelona, on 8 July 2024, at the age of 89. Her funeral was held on 10 July 2024 at the Sant Gervasi funeral home in Barcelona. Dignitaries in attendance included her husband and their children, as well as Artur Mas, Josep Rull, Joaquim Forn, Jaume Giró, Violant Cervera, and FC Barcelona president, Joan Laporta.
