= Government of Pere Aragonès =

Catalan regional government

- Executive Council of Catalonia
- 2021–2024
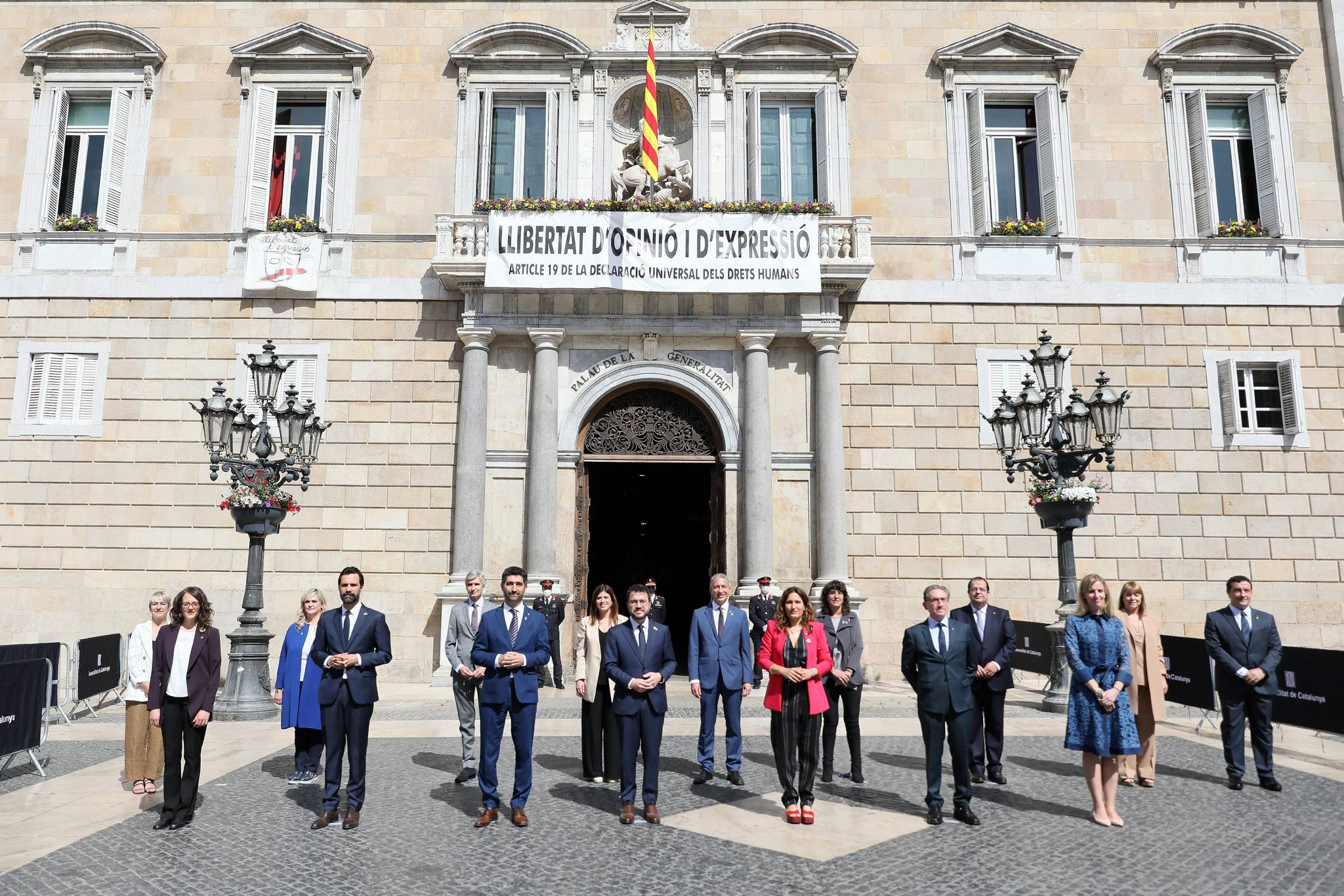
- The government in May 2021.
- Date formed: 26 May 2021
- Date dissolved: 12 August 2024

People and organisations
- Monarch: Felipe VI
- President: Pere Aragonès
- Vice President: Jordi Puigneró (2021–2022); Laura Vilagrà (2024)
- No. of ministers: 14 (Note: Does not include the President.)
- Total no. of members: 24
- Member parties: ERC; Junts (2021–2022)
- Status in legislature: Minority (coalition) (2021–2022); Minority (single-party) (2022–2024)
- Opposition party: PSC
- Opposition leader: Salvador Illa

History
- Election: 2021 regional election
- Outgoing election: 2024 regional election
- Legislature term: 13th/14th Parliament
- Budget: 2022, 2023
- Predecessor: Torra
- Successor: Illa

The government of Pere Aragonès was formed on 26 May 2021 following the latter's election as President of the Government of Catalonia by the Parliament of Catalonia on 21 May and his swearing-in on 24 May, as a result of Republican Left of Catalonia (ERC) and Together for Catalonia (Junts) being able to muster a majority of seats in the Parliament with external support from the Popular Unity Candidacy (CUP) following the 2021 Catalan regional election. It succeeded the Torra government and was the Government of Catalonia from 26 May 2021 to 12 August 2024, a total of 1,174 days, or 3 years, 2 months and 17 days.

Until 2022, the cabinet comprised members of ERC and Junts, as well as a number of independents proposed by both parties. On 7 October 2022, Junts members voted to abandon the government following the dismissal of their vice president Jordi Puigneró by Aragonès, which resulted from a political crisis sparked after Junts had demanded a confidence vote on the president. Aragonès vowed to remain as the head of a minority cabinet made up of ERC members. It was automatically dismissed on 13 May 2024 as a consequence of the 2024 regional election, but remained in acting capacity until the next government was sworn in.

== Investiture ==
Investiture; Pere Aragonès (ERC)
Ballot →	21 May 2021
Required majority →	68 out of 135
Yes: • ERC (33); • Junts (32); • CUP–G (9)	74 / 135
No: • PSC (33); • Vox (11); • ECP–PEC (8); • Cs (6); • PP (3)	61 / 135
Abstentions	0 / 135
Absentees	0 / 135

== Cabinet changes ==
Aragonès's government saw a number of cabinet changes during its tenure:

- On 20 June 2021, the Department of Foreign Action and Transparency was rebranded as the Department of Foreign Action and Open Government.
- On 28 September 2022, Pere Aragonès announced the dismissal of Vice President and Digital Policies and Territory minister Jordi Puigneró, following a political crisis between the two coalition partners ERC and Junts over the latter's demand of a confidence vote on the president. As a result of the dismissal, Junts announced that it would held a party vote on its permanence in the cabinet among its members on 7 October, which resulted in 56% in favour of leaving. As a result, Jaume Giró was replaced by Natàlia Mas as Minister of Economy and Finance; Meritxell Serret replaced Victòria Alsina at the helm of the Foreign Action ministry; Joaquim Nadal replaced Gemma Geis in Research and Universities; Josep Maria Argimon was replaced by Manuel Balcells as Minister of Health, whereas Carles Campuzano and Gemma Ubasart became the new officeholders of the Social Rights and Justice portfolios, respectively. Finally, Juli Fernández was appointed to fill the vacancy left in the Territory ministry by Puigneró's dismissal.
- On 12 June 2023, ahead of the 2023 Spanish general election, Aragonès reshuffled his cabinet by appointing Anna Simó at the helm of the Education portfolio, replacing Josep Gonzàlez Cambray; David Mascort replacing Teresa Jordà as Climatic Action, Food and Rural Agenda minister; and Ester Capella becoming new minister of Territory in place of Juli Fernández.
- On 24 January 2024, Presidency minister Laura Vilagrà was appointed as new vice president.

== Executive Council ==
The Executive Council was structured into the offices for the president, the vice president and 14 ministries.

← Aragonès Government → (26 May 2021 – 12 August 2024)
Portfolio	Name	Party	Took office	Left office	Ref.
President	Pere Aragonès	ERC	22 May 2021	10 August 2024	
Vice President; Minister of Digital Policies and Territory	Jordi Puigneró	Junts	26 May 2021	29 September 2022	
Minister of the Presidency	Laura Vilagrà	ERC	26 May 2021	24 January 2024	
Minister of Business and Labour	Roger Torrent	ERC	26 May 2021	12 August 2024	
Minister of Economy and Finance	Jaume Giró	Independent (Note: Joined Junts in February 2022.)	26 May 2021	7 October 2022	
Minister of Equality and Feminism	Tània Verge	Independent	26 May 2021	12 August 2024	
Minister of Foreign Action and Transparency	Victòria Alsina	Independent	26 May 2021	20 June 2021	
Minister of Education	Josep González Cambray	ERC	26 May 2021	12 June 2023	
Minister of Research and Universities	Gemma Geis	Junts	26 May 2021	7 October 2022	
Minister of Climatic Action, Food and Rural Agenda	Teresa Jordà	ERC	26 May 2021	12 June 2023	
Minister of Health	Josep Maria Argimon	Independent	26 May 2021	7 October 2022	
Minister of the Interior	Joan Ignasi Elena	Independent	26 May 2021	12 August 2024	
Minister of Social Rights	Violant Cervera	Junts	26 May 2021	7 October 2022	
Minister of Culture	Natàlia Garriga	ERC	26 May 2021	12 August 2024	
Minister of Justice	Lourdes Ciuró	Junts	26 May 2021	7 October 2022	
=== Changes June 2021 ===
Portfolio	Name	Party	Took office	Left office	Ref.
Minister of Foreign Action and Open Government (Note: On 20 June 2021, the Department of Foreign Action and Transparency was rebranded as the Department of Foreign Action and Open Government.)	Victòria Alsina	Independent (Note: Joined Junts in October 2022.)	20 June 2021	10 October 2022	
=== Changes September 2022 ===
Portfolio	Name	Party	Took office	Left office	Ref.
Minister of Digital Policies and Territory	Gemma Geis took on the ordinary discharge of duties from 3 to 7 October 2022.				
=== Changes October 2022 ===
Portfolio	Name	Party	Took office	Left office	Ref.
Minister of Economy and Finance	Natàlia Mas	ERC	10 October 2022	12 August 2024	
Minister of Foreign Action and European Union (Note: On 10 October 2022, the departments of Digital Policies and Territory, Foreign Action and Open Government and Justice were rebranded as the Territory, Foreign Action and European Union and Justice, Rights and Memory portfolios.)	Meritxell Serret	ERC	10 October 2022	12 August 2024	
Minister of Research and Universities	Joaquim Nadal	Independent	10 October 2022	12 August 2024	
Minister of Territory	Juli Fernández	ERC	10 October 2022	12 June 2023	
Minister of Health	Manuel Balcells	ERC	10 October 2022	12 August 2024	
Minister of Social Rights	Carles Campuzano	Independent	10 October 2022	12 August 2024	
Minister of Justice, Rights and Memory	Gemma Ubasart	Independent	10 October 2022	12 August 2024	
=== Changes June 2023 ===
Portfolio	Name	Party	Took office	Left office	Ref.
Minister of Education	Anna Simó	ERC	12 June 2023	12 August 2024	
Minister of Climatic Action, Food and Rural Agenda	David Mascort	ERC	12 June 2023	12 August 2024	
Minister of Territory	Ester Capella	ERC	12 June 2023	12 August 2024	
=== Changes January 2024 ===
Portfolio	Name	Party	Took office	Left office	Ref.
Vice President; Minister of the Presidency	Laura Vilagrà	ERC	24 January 2024	12 August 2024	

== Departmental structure ==
Pere Aragonès's government is organised into several superior and governing units, whose number, powers and hierarchical structure may vary depending on the ministerial department.

Unit/body rank

- (■) General secretary
- (■) Director-general

Office (Original name)	Portrait	Name	Took office	Left office	Alliance/party	Ref.
=== Presidency ===
Presidency (Presidència de la Generalitat)		Pere Aragonès	22 May 2021	10 August 2024	ERC	
Vice Presidency (Vicepresidència de la Generalitat)		Jordi Puigneró	26 May 2021	29 September 2022	Junts	
Vice Presidency (Vicepresidència de la Generalitat)		Laura Vilagrà	24 January 2024	12 August 2024	ERC	
Vice Presidency (Vicepresidència de la Generalitat)	See Department of Digital Policies and Territory (26 May 2021 – 29 September 2022); See Department of the Presidency (24 January 2024 – present)					
=== Department of the Presidency ===
Department of the Presidency (Departament de la Presidència)		Laura Vilagrà	26 May 2021	12 August 2024	ERC	
=== Department of Digital Policies and Territory ===
Department of Digital Policies and Territory (Departament de Polítiques Digitals i Territori) (until 10 October 2022) Department of Territory (Departament de Territori) (from 10 October 2022)		Jordi Puigneró	26 May 2021	29 September 2022	Junts	
Department of Digital Policies and Territory (Departament de Polítiques Digitals i Territori) (until 10 October 2022) Department of Territory (Departament de Territori) (from 10 October 2022)		Gemma Geis (ordinary discharge of duties)	3 October 2022	7 October 2022 (renounced)	Junts	
Department of Digital Policies and Territory (Departament de Polítiques Digitals i Territori) (until 10 October 2022) Department of Territory (Departament de Territori) (from 10 October 2022)		Juli Fernández	10 October 2022	12 June 2023	ERC	
Department of Digital Policies and Territory (Departament de Polítiques Digitals i Territori) (until 10 October 2022) Department of Territory (Departament de Territori) (from 10 October 2022)		Ester Capella	12 June 2023	12 August 2024	ERC	
=== Department of Business and Labour ===
Department of Business and Labour (Departament d'Empresa i Treball)		Roger Torrent	26 May 2021	12 August 2024	ERC	
=== Department of Economy and Finance ===
Department of Economy and Finance (Departament d'Economia i Hisenda)		Jaume Giró	26 May 2021	7 October 2022 (resigned)	Junts (Junts from Feb 2022; Indep. until Feb 2022)	
Department of Economy and Finance (Departament d'Economia i Hisenda)		Natàlia Mas	10 October 2022	12 August 2024	ERC	
=== Department of Equality and Feminism ===
Department of Equality and Feminism (Departament d'Igualtat i Feminismes)		Tània Verge	26 May 2021	12 August 2024	ERC (Independent)	
=== Department of Foreign Action ===
Department of Foreign Action and Transparency (Departament d'Acció Exterior i Transparència) (until 20 June 2021) Department of Foreign Action and Open Government (Departament d'Acció Exterior i Govern Obert) (20 June 2021 – 10 October 2022) Department of Foreign Action and European Union (Departament d'Acció Exterior i Unió Europea) (from 10 October 2022)		Victòria Alsina	26 May 2021	10 October 2022	Junts (Junts from Oct 2022; Indep. until Oct 2022)	
Department of Foreign Action and Transparency (Departament d'Acció Exterior i Transparència) (until 20 June 2021) Department of Foreign Action and Open Government (Departament d'Acció Exterior i Govern Obert) (20 June 2021 – 10 October 2022) Department of Foreign Action and European Union (Departament d'Acció Exterior i Unió Europea) (from 10 October 2022)		Meritxell Serret	10 October 2022	12 August 2024	ERC	
=== Department of Education ===
Department of Education (Departament d'Educació)		Josep González Cambray	26 May 2021	12 June 2023	ERC	
Department of Education (Departament d'Educació)		Anna Simó	12 June 2023	12 August 2024	ERC	
=== Department of Research and Universities ===
Department of Research and Universities (Departament de Recerca i Universitats)		Gemma Geis	26 May 2021	7 October 2022 (resigned)	Junts	
Department of Research and Universities (Departament de Recerca i Universitats)		Joaquim Nadal	10 October 2022	12 August 2024	ERC (Independent)	
=== Department of Climatic Action, Food and Rural Agenda ===
Department of Climatic Action, Food and Rural Agenda (Departament d'Acció Climàtica, Alimentació i Agenda Rural)		Teresa Jordà	26 May 2021	12 June 2023	ERC	
Department of Climatic Action, Food and Rural Agenda (Departament d'Acció Climàtica, Alimentació i Agenda Rural)		David Mascort	12 June 2023	12 August 2024	ERC	
=== Department of Health ===
Department of Health (Departament de Salut)		Josep Maria Argimon	26 May 2021	7 October 2022 (resigned)	Junts (Independent)	
Department of Health (Departament de Salut)		Manuel Balcells	10 October 2022	12 August 2024	ERC	
=== Department of the Interior ===
Department of the Interior (Departament d'Interior)		Joan Ignasi Elena	26 May 2021	12 August 2024	ERC (Independent)	
=== Department of Social Rights ===
Department of Social Rights (Departament de Drets Socials)		Violant Cervera	26 May 2021	7 October 2022 (resigned)	Junts	
Department of Social Rights (Departament de Drets Socials)		Carles Campuzano	10 October 2022	12 August 2024	ERC (Independent)	
=== Department of Culture ===
Department of Culture (Departament de Cultura)		Natàlia Garriga	26 May 2021	12 August 2024	ERC	
=== Department of Justice ===
Department of Justice (Departament de Justícia) (until 10 October 2022) Department of Justice, Rights and Memory (Departament de Justícia, Drets i Memòria) (from 10 October 2022)		Lourdes Ciuró	26 May 2021	7 October 2022 (resigned)	Junts	
Department of Justice (Departament de Justícia) (until 10 October 2022) Department of Justice, Rights and Memory (Departament de Justícia, Drets i Memòria) (from 10 October 2022)		Gemma Ubasart	10 October 2022	12 August 2024	ERC (Independent)	

== Notes ==
Preceded by Torra	Government of Catalonia; 2021–2024	Succeeded by Illa
