= Gemma Geis =

Spanish academic and politician

The Honourable Gemma Geis
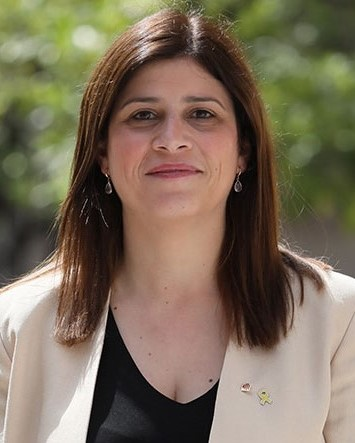
- Official portrait (2021)

Minister of Research and Universities of Catalonia
- In office 26 May 2021 – 10 October 2022
- President: Pere Aragonès
- Preceded by: Ramon Tremosa
- Succeeded by: Joaquim Nadal

Member of the Parliament of Catalonia
- Incumbent
- Assumed office 17 January 2018
- Constituency: Girona

Personal details
- Born: Gemma Geis i Carreras; 9 November 1979 (age 46) Girona, Catalonia, Spain
- Citizenship: Spanish
- Party: Together for Catalonia
- Education: University of Girona
- Occupation: Academic
- Website: gemmageis.cat

Gemma Geis i Carreras (born 9 November 1979) is a Spanish academic and politician from Catalonia, former member of the regional Parliament of Catalonia and Catalan minister of Research and Universities of Catalonia between 2021 and 2022.

== Early life ==
Geis was born on 9 November 1979 in Girona, Catalonia. Her great-grandfather was a Republican Left of Catalonia mayor of Sarrià de Ter in the 1930s and was later imprisoned by the fascist Franco dictatorship. Her great-uncle was author and composer Camil Geis. Geis and her sister Cristina grew up in the Pont Major neighbourhood of Girona where their parents Martí and Quimeta had a metal workshop. As a child she helped out in the family business.

Geis was educated at Institut Carles Rahola where she was a contemporary of Roger Torrent. She has a degree in law (1998-02) from the University of Girona (UdG) and a master's degree in legal practice from the Barcelona Bar Association (Il·lustre Col·legi d'Advocats de Barcelona). In 2011 the UdG awarded her an extraordinary prize for her 2008 law doctorate thesis "La Ejecución de las Sentencias Urbanísticas" (The Execution of Urban Judgments). For her doctorate she carried out research at the University of Florence, Paris 1 Panthéon-Sorbonne University and Harvard University.

== Career ==
Geis practiced law at the Bar Association of Girona (Il·lustre Col·legi d'Advocats de Girona) but is currently registered as a non-practicing lawyer. She was a member of the Prague Group of Jurists. She has been teaching at the UdG since 2003 and is currently associate professor of administrative law. She was vice-rector of Regulatory Development, Governance and Communication at the UdG from 2013 to 2017.

Geis was a member of the Girona monitoring committee for the 2014 Catalan self-determination referendum (9-N). She was invited by Carles Puigdemont to contest the municipal elections in Girona but declined. However, following the 2017 Catalan independence referendum (1-O), she decided to temporarily suspend her academic career and enter politics. She contested the 2017 regional election as an independent Together for Catalonia (JuntsxCat) electoral alliance candidate in the Province of Girona and was elected to the Parliament of Catalonia. She was re-elected at the 2021 regional election.

Considered a Puigdemont ally, she was heavily involved in JuntsxCat and the National Call for the Republic. On 26 May 2021 she was sworn in as Minister of Research and Universities in the new government of President Pere Aragonès.

== Other activities ==
- Barcelona Institute for Global Health (ISGlobal), Member of the Board of Trustees
- Greenpeace, Member

== Personal life ==
Geis has two children.

== Electoral history ==
Electoral history of Gemma Geis
Election	Constituency	Party	Alliance	No.	Result
2017 regional	Province of Girona	Independent	Together for Catalonia	1	Elected
2021 regional	Province of Girona		Together for Catalonia	1	Elected
