= Government of Quim Torra =

Catalonian regional government

- Executive Council of Catalonia
- 2018–2021
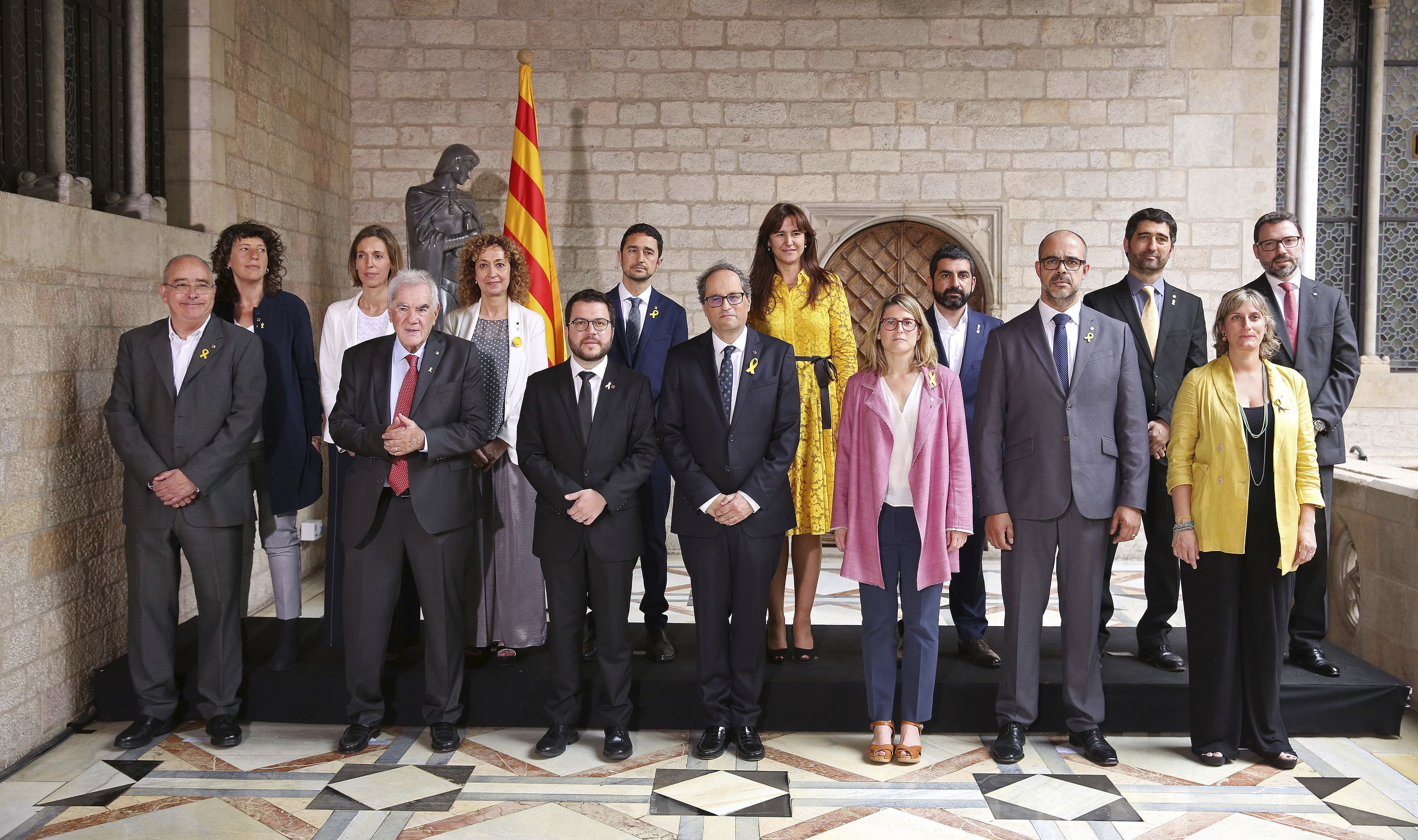
- The government in June 2018.
- Date formed: 1 June 2018
- Date dissolved: 26 May 2021

People and organisations
- Monarch: Felipe VI
- President: Quim Torra (2018–2020); Pere Aragonès (2020–2021; acting)
- Vice President: Pere Aragonès
- No. of ministers: 13 (Note: Does not include the President.)
- Total no. of members: 20
- Member party: JuntsxCat / JxCat; ERC; PDeCAT
- Status in legislature: Minority (coalition)
- Opposition party: Cs
- Opposition leader: Inés Arrimadas (2017–2019); Carlos Carrizosa (2019–2021)

History
- Election: 2017 regional election
- Outgoing election: 2021 regional election
- Legislature term: 12th Parliament of Catalonia
- Budget: 2020
- Predecessor: Puigdemont
- Successor: Aragonès

The Torra Government was the regional government of Catalonia led by President Quim Torra between 2018 and 2020. It was formed in May 2018 after the regional election. Pere Aragonès took office as the interim president when the High Court of Justice of Catalonia barred Torra from public office on 28 September 2020.

== Investiture ==
Investiture; Quim Torra (Independent)
Ballot →	12 May 2018	14 May 2018
Required majority →	68 out of 135	Simple
Yes: • JuntsxCat (34); • ERC (32)	66 / 135	66 / 135
No: • Cs (36); • PSC (17); • CatComú–Podem (8); • PP (4)	65 / 135	65 / 135
Abstentions: • CUP (4)	4 / 135	4 / 135
Absentees	0 / 135	0 / 135

== History ==
On 27 October 2017 the Catalan Parliament declared independence in a vote boycotted by opposition MPs. Almost immediately the Senate of Spain invoked article 155 of the constitution, dismissing President Carles Puigdemont and the Catalan government and imposing direct rule on Catalonia. The following day Spanish Prime Minister Mariano Rajoy dissolved the Catalan Parliament and called for fresh regional elections on 21 December 2017.

At the election Catalan secessionists retained a slim majority in the Catalan Parliament. On 22 January 2018 Catalan Parliament President Roger Torrent officially proposed Puigdemont to be president. However, on 27 January 2018 the Constitutional Court of Spain ruled that Puigdemont, who had been living in exile since 30 October 2017, could not participate in any investiture debate via video conference or by getting another MP to read his speech and that he had to appear in person in parliament after receiving "prior judicial authorisation". The ruling effectively blocked the investiture of Puigdemont who faced arrest on charges rebellion, sedition and misuse of public funds if he returned to Spain. As a result Torrent announced on 30 January that Puigdemont's investiture vote would be postponed though he later insisted that Puigdemont "is and will be" the candidate for president.

As the political impasse continued Puigdemont came under pressure to step aside. On 1 March 2018 Puigdemont announced that he was withdrawing his candidature in favour of jailed independence activist Jordi Sànchez. However, on 9 March 2018 Supreme Court judge Pablo Llarena refused permission for Sànchez to leave prison in order to attend the investiture debate. Sànchez ended his candidature on 21 March 2018.

The secessionists hastily nominated Jordi Turull to be president. Turull was due to appear before the Supreme Court on 23 March 2018 and if the court jailed him he would not have been able to attend the investiture debate, scuppering his chances of becoming president. At the investiture vote held on 22 March 2018 Turull secured 64 votes (JuntsxCat 33; ERC–CatSí 31) with 65 votes against (Cs 36; PSC 17; CatComú–Podem 8; PP 4), four abstentions (CUP–CC 4) and two absentees (JuntsxCat 1; ERC–CatSí 1). A second vote on Turull's candidature was to be held on 24 March 2018 but on 23 March 2018 Llarena remanded in custody Turull and four other Catalan leaders. On 3 April 2018 and 24 April 2018 the Catalan Parliament's bureau approved the two absentee MPs - Puigdemont (JuntsxCat) and Antoni Comín (ERC–CatSí) - voting by proxy.

Turull's investiture vote had set in motion a two month deadline for a new president to be sworn in or else parliament would be dissolved and elections called. On 10 May 2018 Puigdemont nominated Quim Torra, the so-called "plan D", to be president. At the investiture vote held on 12 May 2018 Torra secured 66 votes (JuntsxCat 34; ERC–CatSí 32) with 65 votes against (Cs 36; PSC 17; CatComú–Podem 8; PP 4) and four abstentions (CUP-CC 4), failing to achieve the 68 votes necessary for an absolute majority. As a result a second vote was held on 14 May 2018 at which he only needed a simple majority to become president. The result of the second vote was exactly the same as the first vote - 66 in favour, 65 against and four abstentions - and as a result Torra was elected the 131st President of Catalonia. King Felipe issued a royal decree on 15 May 2018 approving Torra's appointment and on 17 May 2018 he was sworn in.

On 19 May 2018 Torra announced his new government of 13 ministers, two of whom were in jail (Josep Rull and Turull) and two were in exile (Comín and Lluís Puig). The Spanish government condemned the inclusion of jailed/exiled politicians as provocative and refused to approve Torra's appointments or to revoke direct rule. Faced with this opposition Torra announced a new government on 29 May 2018 without the jailed/exiled politicians. In one of his last acts, ousted Spanish Prime Minister Mariano Rajoy ordered that direct rule be lifted as soon as the new ministers were sworn in. On 2 June 2018 the new ministers were sworn in at the Palau de la Generalitat de Catalunya, ending seven months of direct rule.

== Executive Council ==
Portrait	Name	Office	Took office	Left office	Party	^{Refs.}
	Quim Torra	President	15 May 2018	28 September 2020	Independent	
	Pere Aragonès	Vice President Minister of Economy and Finance	29 May 2018		Republican Left of Catalonia	
	Meritxell Budó	Minister of the Presidency Spokesperson of the Government	24 March 2019		Together for Catalonia	
	Josep Bargalló	Minister of Education	29 May 2018		Republican Left of Catalonia	
Àngels Ponsa defensa al Congrés la petició del Parlament de rebaixar l'IVA cultural (18673509831)	Àngles Ponsa	Minister of Culture	3 September 2020		Together for Catalonia	
	Miquel Sàmper	Minister of the Interior	3 September 2020		Together for Catalonia	
	Damià Calvet	Minister of Territory and Sustainability	29 May 2018		Together for Catalonia	
	Ester Capella	Minister of Justice	29 May 2018		Republican Left of Catalonia	
	Ramon Tremosa	Minister of Enterprise and Knowledge	3 September 2020		Independent	
	Chakir El Homrani	Minister of Labour, Social Affairs and Family	29 May 2018		Republican Left of Catalonia	
	Teresa Jordà	Minister of Agriculture, Livestock, Fisheries and Food	29 May 2018		Republican Left of Catalonia	
	Alfred Bosch	Minister of Foreign Action, Institutional Relations and Transparency	23 November 2018	9 March 2020	Republican Left of Catalonia	
	Bernat Solé	Minister of Foreign Action, Institutional Relations and Transparency	21 March 2020		Republican Left of Catalonia	
	Jordi Puigneró	Minister of Digital Policies and Public Administration	29 May 2018		Together for Catalonia	
	Alba Vergés	Minister of Health	29 May 2018		Republican Left of Catalonia	
	Miquel Buch	Minister of the Interior	29 May 2018	3 September 2020	Together for Catalonia	
	Maria Àngels Chacón	Minister of Enterprise and Knowledge	29 May 2018	3 September 2020	Catalan European Democratic Party	
	Mariàngela Vilallonga	Minister of Culture	24 March 2019	3 September 2020	Independent	
