= Meritxell Budó =

Spanish politician (born 1969)

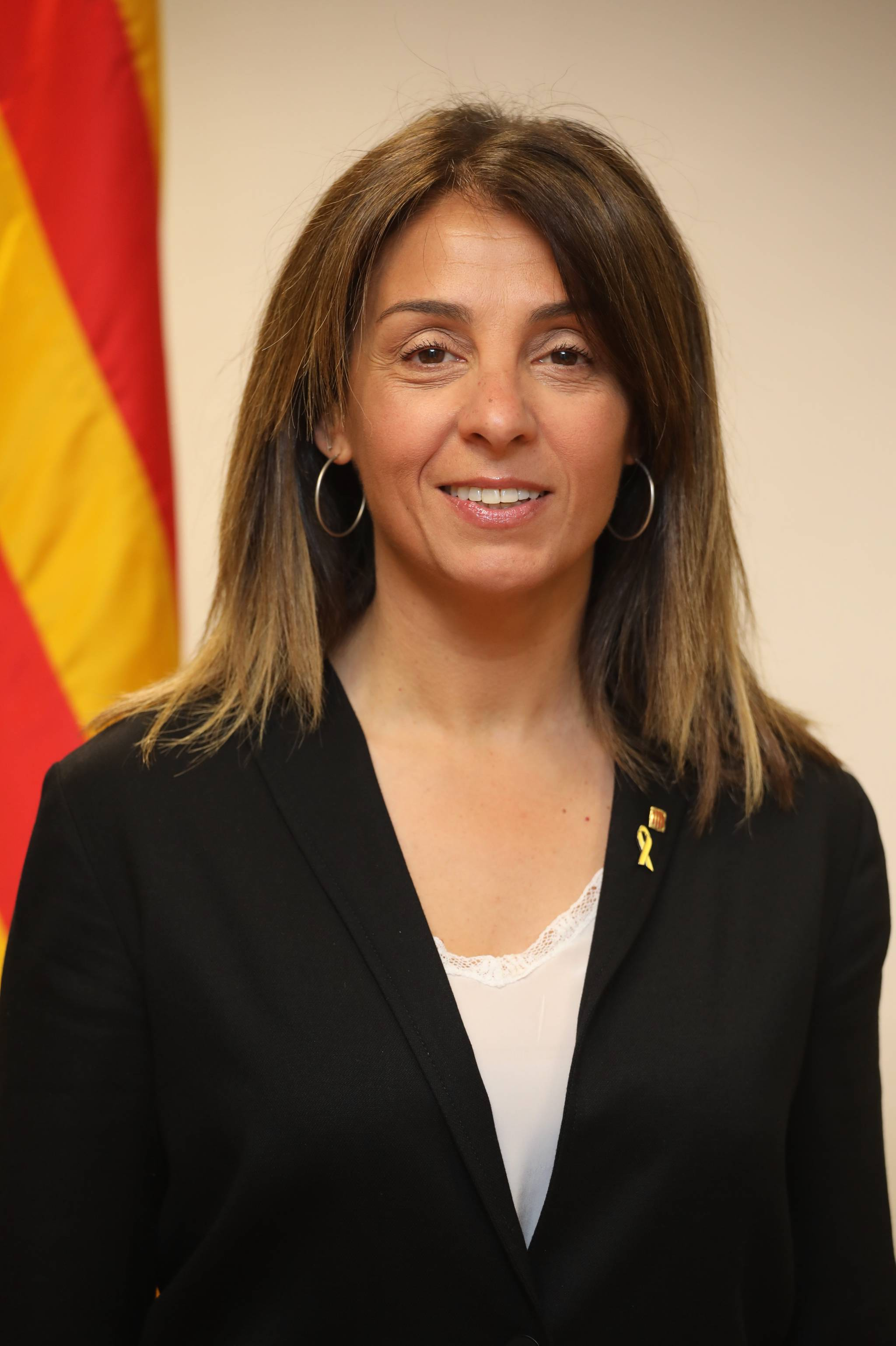
- Budó in March 2019

Mayor of La Garriga
- Incumbent
- Assumed office 17 June 2023
- Preceded by: Dolors Castellà
- In office 11 June 2011 – 24 March 2019
- In office 16 June 2007 – 27 March 2008

Minister of the Presidency of Catalonia
- In office 25 March 2019 – 24 May 2021
- President: Quim Torra
- Preceded by: Elsa Artadi
- Succeeded by: Laura Vilagrà

Government Spokesperson of Catalonia
- In office 25 March 2019 – 1 June 2021
- President: Quim Torra
- Preceded by: Elsa Artadi
- Succeeded by: Patrícia Plaja

Member of La Garriga Municipal Council
- Incumbent
- Assumed office 17 June 2023
- In office 2006 – 24 March 2019

Personal details
- Born: Meritxell Budó i Pla; 8 March 1969 (age 57) Barcelona, Catalonia, Spain
- Citizenship: Spain
- Party: Junts (2020–present)
- Other political affiliations: CDC (until 2016); PDeCAT (2016–2020)
- Education: University of Barcelona
- Occupation: Pharmacist

Meritxell Budó i Pla (born 8 March 1969) is a Spanish politician and pharmacist from Catalonia. Budó was Minister of the Presidency and Government Spokesman of Catalonia between 2019 and 2021. She is the mayor of La Garriga.

== Early life ==
Budó was born on 19 August 1976 in Barcelona, Catalonia, Spain. She has lived in La Garriga since the age of six. She has a degree in pharmacy from the University of Barcelona and a master's degree in pharmaceutical industry from the Center for Advanced Studies in the Pharmaceutical Industry (CESIF). She joined the Democratic Convergence of Catalonia (CDC) in 2002.

== Career ==
Budó was a technical director in the veterinary pharmaceutical industry.

At the 2003 local elections Budó was placed 8th on the Convergence and Union (CiU) electoral alliance's list of candidates in La Garriga but the alliance only managed to win 5 seats in the municipality and as a result she failed to get elected. She was however appointed to the municipal council in 2006. She was re-elected at the 2007 local elections and became mayor of La Garriga with support of the People's Party. She was ousted by Neus Bulbena in March 2008. She was re-elected at the 2011 local elections and became mayor of La Garriga again with support of the Acord Independentista per La Garriga-Acord Municipal. She was re-elected at the 2015 local elections.

Budó was a member of the provincial deputation for Barcelona from July 2015 to March 2019. She was the councillor for social policies on the Vallés Oriental County Council (2011–15), president of the Catalan Development Cooperation Fund and president of the Confederation of Funds for Cooperation and Solidarity (2012–17). She was president of the CDC's La Garriga branch from 2004 to 2012. She has been a member of the National Executive Directorate of the Catalan European Democratic Party (PDeCAT) since July 2018 and was one of the founding members of the Council for the Republic. She is the co-author of La Transició Nacional (Editorial Malhivern, 2012).

At the 2017 regional election Budó was placed 32nd on the Together for Catalonia (JuntsxCat) alliance's list of candidates in Barcelona but the alliance only managed to win 17 seats in the province and as a result she failed to get elected. In March 2019 Budó was appointed Minister of the Presidency and Government Spokesperson in the government of President Quim Torra. She was sworn in on 25 March 2019 at the Palau de la Generalitat de Catalunya.

In July 2020 Budó joined the newly formed Together for Catalonia political party.

== Personal life ==
Budó has a teenage son.

== Electoral history ==
Electoral history of Meritxell Budó
Election	Constituency	Party	Alliance	No.	Result
2003 local	La Garriga	Democratic Convergence of Catalonia	Convergence and Union	8	Not elected
2007 local	La Garriga	Democratic Convergence of Catalonia	Convergence and Union	1	Elected
2011 local	La Garriga	Democratic Convergence of Catalonia	Convergence and Union	1	Elected
2015 local	La Garriga	Democratic Convergence of Catalonia	Convergence and Union	1	Elected
2017 regional	Province of Barcelona	Catalan European Democratic Party	Together for Catalonia	32	Not elected
