= List of vice presidents of Catalonia =

Vice President of Catalonia
- Vicepresidència de Catalunya
- Seal of the Generalitat of Catalonia

- Flag of Catalonia
- Department of the Vice President
- Member of: Executive Council of Catalonia
- Reports to: President of Catalonia
- Seat: Barcelona
- Appointer: President of Catalonia
- Inaugural holder: Joan Casanovas i Maristany
- Formation: 29 December 1931

This article lists the vice presidents of Catalonia, the second most senior position in the Government of Catalonia. The position, previously known as First Minister (Catalan: Conseller Primer, lit. 'First Councillor'), Chief Advisor (Catalan: Conseller en Cap), Chief Executive Officer (Catalan: Conseller Delegat) and Head of the Executive Board (Catalan: Cap del Consell Executiu), is optional and is appointed by the president of Catalonia.

== List of officeholders ==
Office name:

- Vice Presidency of the Council of Ministers (1840–1841; 1925–1931; 1933–1934)
- Vice Presidency of the Government (1938–1939; 1962–1973; 1982–1995; 2011–2020)
- First Vice Presidency of the Government (1974–1975; 1976; 1977–1979; 1981–1982; 1996–2011; 2020–present)
- Vice Presidency of the Government for Defence Affairs (1975–1976)
- First Vice Presidency of the Government for Defence Affairs (1976–1977)
- First Vice Presidency of the Government, in charge of the Coordination of the Security and National Defence Affairs (1979–1981)
- Vice Presidency of the Government for Economic Affairs (1982; 2011)

=== Second Republic and exile (1931–1977) ===
Name	Portrait	Party	Took office	Left office	President	Ministerial title	Refs
Joan Casanovas i Maristany		Republican Left of Catalonia	29 December 1931	3 October 1932	Francesc Macià	Vice President	
Joan Lluhí		Republican Left of Catalonia	19 December 1932	24 January 1933	Francesc Macià	Head of the Executive Board	
Carles Pi i Sunyer		Republican Left of Catalonia	24 January 1933	4 October 1933	Francesc Macià	Chief Executive Officer	
Miquel Santaló i Parvorell		Republican Left of Catalonia	4 October 1933	3 January 1934	Francesc Macià	First Minister	
Joan Casanovas i Maristany		Republican Left of Catalonia	31 July 1936	26 September 1936	Lluís Companys	First Minister	
Josep Tarradellas		Republican Left of Catalonia	26 December 1936	5 May 1937	Lluís Companys	First Minister	

=== Restored autonomy (2001–present) ===
Portrait	Name (Birth–Death)	Term of office			Party	Government	President (Tenure)	Ref.
Portrait	Name (Birth–Death)	Took office	Left office	Duration	Party	Government	President (Tenure)	Ref.
	Artur Mas (born 1956)	17 January 2001	20 December 2003	2 years and 337 days	CDC	Pujol VI	Jordi Pujol (1980–2003)	
	Josep-Lluís Carod-Rovira (born 1952)	20 December 2003	20 February 2004	62 days	ERC	Maragall	Pasqual Maragall (2003–2006)	
	Josep Bargalló (born 1958)	20 February 2004	11 May 2006	2 years and 80 days	ERC	Maragall	Pasqual Maragall (2003–2006)	
	Josep-Lluís Carod-Rovira (born 1952)	29 November 2006	29 December 2010	4 years and 30 days	ERC	Montilla	José Montilla (2006–2010)	
	Joana Ortega (born 1959)	29 December 2010	27 December 2012	4 years and 175 days	UDC	Mas I	Artur Mas (2010–2016)	
	Joana Ortega (born 1959)	27 December 2012	22 June 2015	4 years and 175 days	UDC	Mas II	Artur Mas (2010–2016)	
	Neus Munté (born 1970)	22 June 2015	14 January 2016	206 days	CDC	Mas II	Artur Mas (2010–2016)	
	Oriol Junqueras (born 1970)	14 January 2016	28 October 2017 (removed)	1 year and 286 days	ERC	Puigdemont	Carles Puigdemont (2016–2017)	
During this interval, the office was suspended.						Direct rule over Catalonia		
	Pere Aragonès (born 1982)	1 June 2018	26 May 2021	2 years and 358 days	ERC	Torra	Quim Torra (2018–2020)	
	Jordi Puigneró (born 1974)	26 May 2021	29 September 2022	1 year and 126 days	JxCat	Aragonès	Pere Aragonès (2021–2024)	
Office disestablished during this interval.
	Laura Vilagrà (born 1976)	24 January 2024	12 August 2024	201 days	ERC	Aragonès	Pere Aragonès (2021–2024)	
Office disestablished during this interval.
