= Stop JJOO 2030 =

Campaign anti 2030 winter olympics in Barcelona

The Stop JJOO 2030 manifesto is a public statement of 2021 against the Pyrenees-Barcelona 2030 Winter Olympics candidacy. Promoted by a civil society organized by the coordinator of SOS Pyrenees platforms, it has the support of representatives of the rural, mountaineering, cultural and political worlds.

The campaign points out that promoting this candidacy in the context of global warming is severe irresponsibility. Additionally, it warns that the Pyrenees resorts are already largely dependent on artificial snow production and will not be viable mid-term. Hence, it will quickly become obsolete. Thus, the manifesto propounds withdrawing the project from the candidacy. Going further, it asks for the channeling of investments to promote the change of the socio-economic model: the economic diversification, fighting speculation and depopulation in the mountain counties, and the protection of natural and landscaping areas of interest.

== History ==
In February 2022, 150 Catalan scientists published the "Independent Scientific Manifesto on the 2030 Winter Olympics candidacy in the Pyrenees". They state in 10 points why this project is unfeasible. The emphasis is on technical, environmental and socioeconomic factors, such as the lack of transparency in politics. The government of Pere Aragonès has been unable to make accessible to the citizens the environmental impact assessment document so far. The manifesto also argues the increase in mass tourism will have a devastating impact on the biodiversity of mountain areas. Moreover, the region's economic impact would be deficient, perpetuating the precariousness of the labor force. Also, there are a large number of archaeological sites in the Pyrenees which could be badly damaged. Finally, the increase in the demands for energy and water consumption, like the increment in pollution, is unacceptable in the context of a climate emergency.

On 2022 April 1, the platform STOP Olympic Games Aragon was made public. This organization "brings together citizens and groups of people against the macro-project." Despite having its autonomy, it coordinates with the homologous Catalan platform. On April 7, they released their first statement with the slogan Por un Pirineo vivo, Por nuestro futuro ¡STOP JJOO! (literally, For a living Pyrenees, For our future STOP Olympic Games!). The three focal points are clear —first, the withdrawal of the Olympic candidacy as a final decision. Secondly, the search for a compromise finishes off the future projects to widen the ski slopes of Canal Roya and the Vall de Castanesa. This would be linked to new economic investments focused on the needs of the territory and the Pyrenees' inhabitants. With this manifesto, the platform regretted that the government of Javier Lambán wanted to spend 85% of the Next Generation EU budget for sustainable tourism on improving ski resort facilities such as the connection between Candanchú and Astún or the gondola lift from Benasque to Cerler.

On 2022 May 3, musicians from across the country joined forces to sing "The Land to Sow" against the Winter Olympics. The project is led by the Aranese singer Alidé Sans. It had the collaboration of Clara Peya, Montse Castellà, Joina Canyet, Cesk Freixas, Francesc Ribera, Pirat's Sound Sistema, and Natxo Tarrés from the band Gossos, among others.

On 2022 May 15, more than 2000 people in Puigcerdà demanded the government rethink their strategy and abandon this Olympic "nonsense". Their slogan was “For a living Pyrenees. Stop the Olympic Games"; the Assemblea Nacional Catalana and the Unió de Pagesos (Farmers Union) are among their supporters. Amid the climate variability and change, it is simply unthinkable. They are organizing a consultation called for July 24 in several cities of the Catalan counties. On May 27, the government spokeswoman, Laura Vilagrà, announced the postponement of the planned consultation due to the vagueness of the candidacy and the lack of a convincing "technical project".

On the occasion of World Environment Day, Ecologistes de Catalunya published a manifesto stating that the current government cannot respond to the recognized climate emergency. The government "insists on the old solutions from the past to support the snow tourism monoculture and cover up the inability to guarantee the future of the people living in the Pyrenees such as the Winter Olympics". Given that "Catalonia is in the European queue in environmental policies for the inaction of recent governments, at a time when the climate and environmental crisis calls for a green agenda capable of meeting the challenges of climate change, food insecurity, or the energy and resource crisis".

On June 20, 2022, the Spanish Olympic Committee definitively ruled out a candidacy for the 2030 Winter Olympics due to the impossibility of reaching an agreement between the governments of Javier Lambán and Pere Aragonès. Upon hearing the news, the Popular Unity Candidacy and En Comú Podem celebrated the abandonment of this "macro-project" and demanded a new investment plan for the Pyrenees. The Stop Olympic 2030 platform assured that it would continue to work "for another economic, territorial and country model", and that the candidacy would not be considered in the future.
