= Damià Calvet =

Spanish politician

The Honourable Damià Calvet
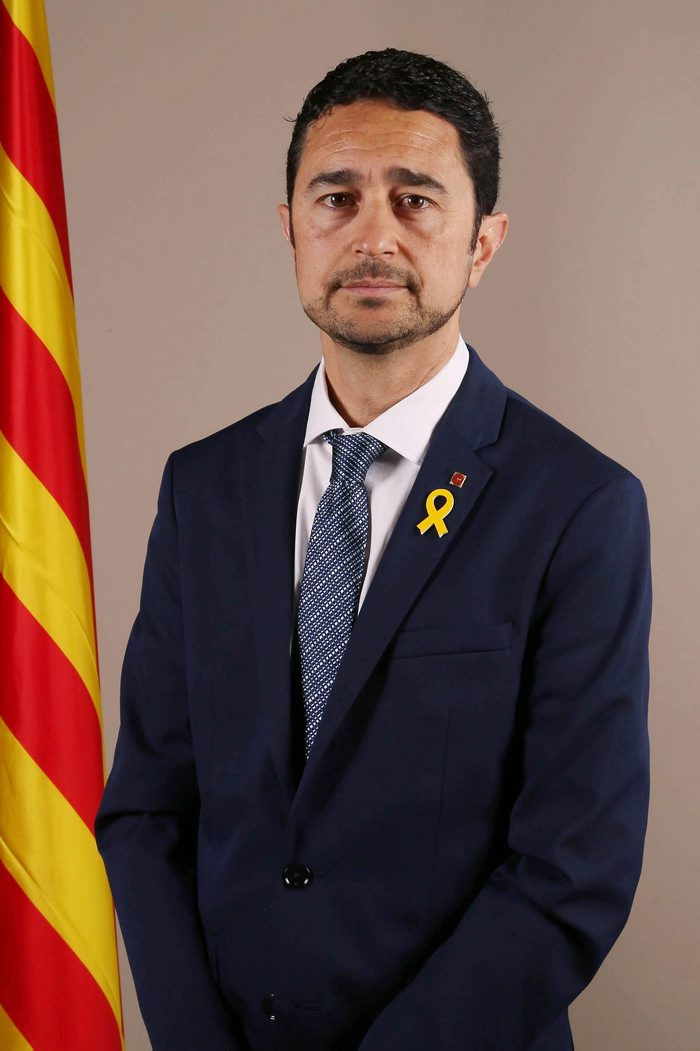
- Calvet in June 2018

Minister of Territory and Sustainability of Catalonia
- In office 2 June 2018 – 26 May 2021
- President: Quim Torra
- Preceded by: Josep Rull (Direct rule from 27 October 2017)

Deputy Mayor of Sant Cugat del Vallès
- In office 2015–2018

Member of the Municipality Council of Sant Cugat del Vallès
- In office 2015–2018

Personal details
- Born: Damià Calvet i Valera; 23 May 1968 (age 57) Vilanova i la Geltrú, Spain
- Citizenship: Spanish
- Party: Together for Catalonia

Damià Calvet i Valera (born 23 May 1968) is a Spanish politician from Catalonia and who served as Minister of Territory and Sustainability of Catalonia between 2018 and 2021.

Born in 1968 in Vilanova i la Geltrú, Calvet studied construction engineering at La Salle before becoming an academic. He later worked in the private sector in the Balearic Islands before holding various senior positions at the Generalitat de Catalunya. He was a deputy mayor of Sant Cugat del Vallès, a municipality in north-eastern Spain, before being appointed Minister of Territory and Sustainability in June 2018.

== Early life ==
Calvet was born on 23 May 1968 in Vilanova i la Geltrú, Catalonia. He has a degree in construction engineering from La Salle (Ramon Llull University), a diploma in technical architecture from Polytechnic University of Catalonia (UPC) and a postgraduate degree in real estate management from Autonomous University of Barcelona.

Calvet was a member the Nationalist Youth of Catalonia (Joventut Nacionalista de Catalunya) from 1984 to 1998 and was secretary and assistant general-secretary organisation. He was a member of the Democratic Convergence of Catalonia (CDC) of which he was national counselor.

== Career ==
Calvet taught at the UPC's Building Project Management Master's Program and was in charge of Institutional Relations at the United Nations University in Barcelona from 1992 to 1995.

Calvet was Chief of Cabinet for the Minister of Territorial Policy and Public Works from 1997 to 2001 and Director-General of Architecture and Housing at the Generalitat de Catalunya from 2001 to 2004. From 2011 to 2013 he was Secretary of Territory and Mobility in the government of Artur Mas. He was appointed director of the Institut Català del Sòl (INCASÒL) in 2013. He was president of Centrals i Infraestructures per a la Mobilitat i les Activitats Logístiques (CIMALSA), a company owned by the Generalitat and responsible for promotion, development and management of infrastructures and centres for the transport of goods and logistics.

Calvet worked in the private sector in the Balearic Islands as the regional manager for the real estate group Vertix. During his time in the islands he was also a member of the Chamber of Commerce, Industry and Navigation of Mallorca, vice-president of the Association of Real Estate Promoters of the Balearic Islands (PROINBA), member of the board of directors of the Balearic Institute of Housing (IBAVI), urban development manager for Banco Sabadell in the Balearics and was founding partner of Dèria Editors.

Calvet contested the 2015 local elections as a Convergence and Union (CiU) electoral alliance candidate in Sant Cugat del Vallès and was elected. He was deputy mayor for Urban Planning, Mobility and Housing and Government Coordinator in Sant Cugat del Vallès. He resigned as deputy mayor in June 2018.

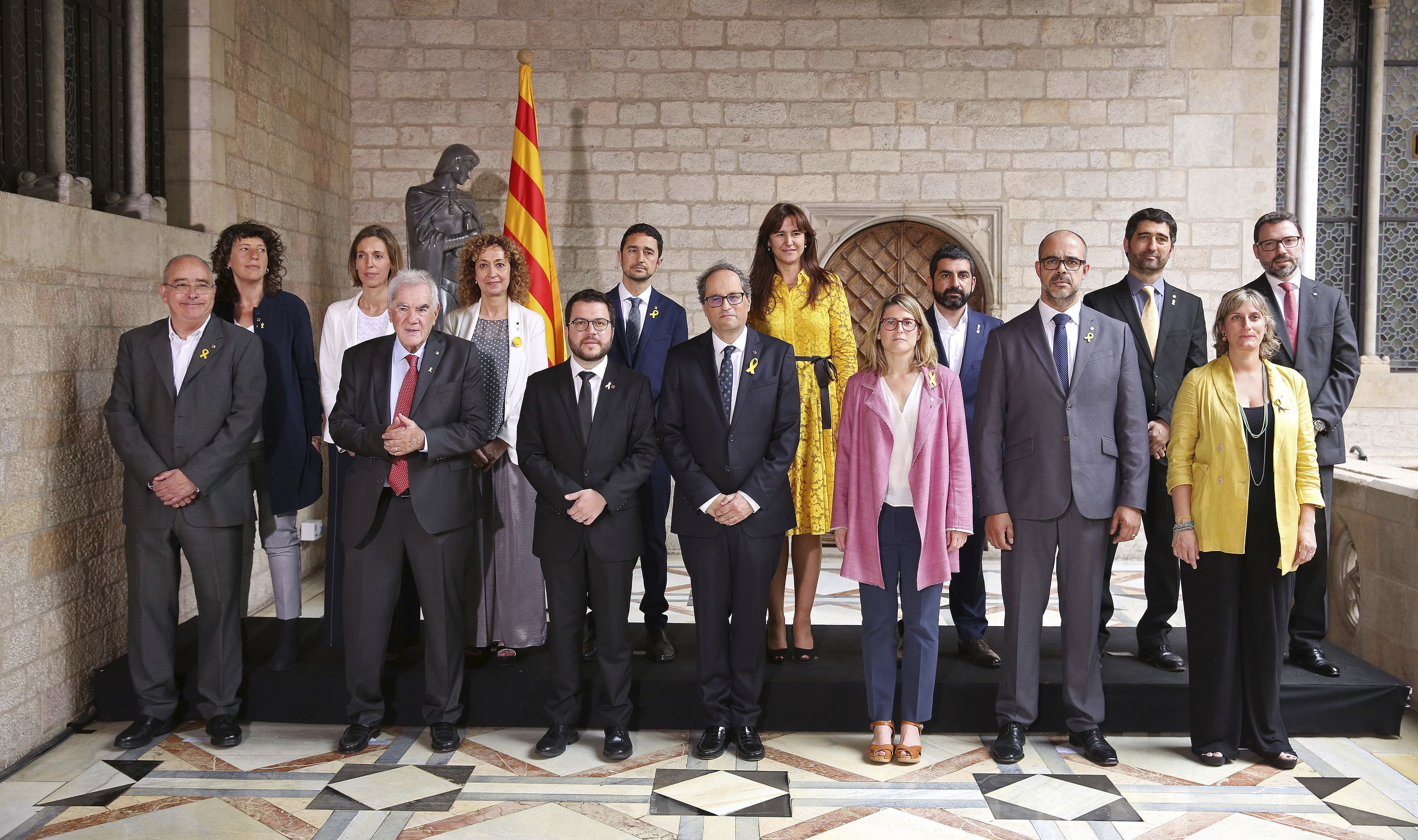
Calvet and other members of the Catalan government on 2 June 2018

On 19 May 2018 newly elected President of Catalonia Quim Torra nominated a new government in which Josep Rull, who was in jail, was to be Minister of Territory and Sustainability. However, the Spanish government condemned the inclusion of jailed/exiled politicians in the government as provocative and refused to approve Torra's appointments or to revoke direct rule. Faced with this opposition Torra announced a new government on 29 May 2018 without the jailed/exiled politicians. Calvet was to be Minister of Territory and Sustainability in the new government. He was sworn in on 2 June 2018 at the Palau de la Generalitat de Catalunya.

In July 2020 Calvet joined the newly formed Together for Catalonia political party.

== Electoral history ==
Electoral history of Damià Calvet
| Election | Constituency | Party | Alliance | No. | Result |
|---|---|---|---|---|---|
| 2015 local | Sant Cugat del Vallès | Democratic Convergence of Catalonia | Convergence and Union | 4 | Elected |
