= Violant Cervera =

Spanish politician

The Honourable Violant Cervera
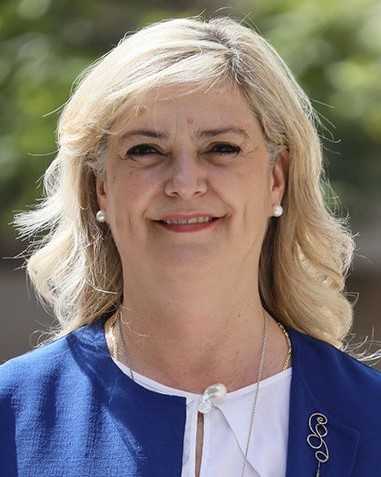
- Official portrait, 2021

Minister of Social Rights of Catalonia
- In office 26 May 2021 – 7 October 2022
- President: Pere Aragonès
- Preceded by: Chakir El Homrani
- Succeeded by: Carles Campuzano

Member of the Parliament of Catalonia
- In office 17 December 2012 – 28 October 2017
- Constituency: Lleida

Personal details
- Born: Francesca Violant Cervera i Gòdia; 12 June 1969 (age 57) Lleida, Catalonia, Spain
- Citizenship: Spanish
- Party: Together for Catalonia
- Education: University of Lleida

Francesca Violant Cervera i Gòdia (born 12 June 1969) is a Spanish politician from Catalonia, former member of the Parliament of Catalonia and the former Minister of Social Rights of Catalonia.

== Early life ==
Cervera was born on 12 June 1969 in Lleida, Catalonia. She has a degree in Hispanic philology from the University of Lleida (1994). She joined the Nationalist Youth of Catalonia (JNC) in 1989 and the Democratic Convergence of Catalonia (CDC) in 1990.

== Career ==
Cervera was a JNC national councillor and head of its Lleida branch (1997–99). She was a CDC national councillor (1996-00, 2004–08 and 2008–11) and has been a member of its Lleida branch committee since 2004. She has been head of the Casa Gran del Catalanisme's Lleida branch since 2008. In October 2016 Cervera ran for the leadership of the Catalan European Democratic Party's Lleida branch but was defeated by Joan Reñé i Huguet, receiving 26 votes to Reñé's 30 votes.

Cervera was Director General of Civic and Community Action at the Generalitat de Catalunya's Department of Social Welfare and Family from 2011 to 2012. She has been the Government of Catalonia's delegate in Lleida since 2018.

Cervera contested the 1991 local elections as a JNC candidate in Lleida. At the 2009 European elections she was placed 26th on the Coalition for Europe electoral alliance's list of candidates but the alliance only managed to win three seats and as a result she failed to get elected.

Cervera contested the 2012 regional election as a Convergence and Union (CiU) electoral alliance candidate in the Province of Lleida and was elected to the Parliament of Catalonia. She was re-elected at the 2015 regional election.

At the 2021 regional election Cervera was placed 14th on the Together for Catalonia electoral alliance's list of candidates in the Province of Lleida but the alliance only managed to win five seats in the province and as a result she failed to get elected. On 26 May 2021 she was sworn in as Minister of Social Rights in the new government of President Pere Aragonès.

Cervera is a member of Òmnium Cultural and president of the Friends of the Casa Gran del Catalanisme Association of Lleida (Associació Amics de la Casa Gran del Catalanisme de Lleida). She is a member of the Revista 16 del Pla d’Urgell's editorial team.

== Electoral history ==
Electoral history of Violant Cervera
Election	Constituency	Party	Alliance	No.	Result
1991 local	Lleida	Nationalist Youth of Catalonia	Convergence and Union		Not elected
2009 European	Spain	Democratic Convergence of Catalonia	Coalition for Europe	26	Not elected
2012 regional	Province of Lleida	Democratic Convergence of Catalonia	Convergence and Union	8	Elected
2015 regional	Province of Lleida	Democratic Convergence of Catalonia	Junts pel Sí	5	Elected
2021 regional	Province of Lleida		Together for Catalonia	14	Not elected
