= National Call for the Republic =

National Call for the Republic Crida Nacional per la República
- Abbreviation: CNxR
- Leader: Carles Puigdemont
- President: Jordi Sànchez
- Secretary-General: Antoni Morral
- Founded: 16 July 2018
- Registered: 8 January 2019
- Dissolved: 19 July 2020
- Merged into: Together for Catalonia (2020)
- Headquarters: C/ Calders, 11, 1º 08003, Barcelona
- Membership (2019): ▲16,954
- Ideology: Catalan independence Republicanism; Souverainism; Unilateralism
- Political position: Big tent
- National affiliation: Together for Catalonia (2017) (2018–20)
- Colors: Yellow; Black

Website
- www.cridanacional.cat

The National Call for the Republic (Catalan: Crida Nacional per la República, Crida or CNxR) was a pro-independence, big tent political party in Catalonia. It aimed at uniting pro-independence political parties and organisations throughout Catalonia towards the common goal of establishing a Catalan Republic, regardless of political ideology. Its members included both independent figures from the civil society and aligned to the Together for Catalonia (JxCat) alliance—such as Quim Torra or Jordi Sànchez—as well as prominent members of the Catalan European Democratic Party (PDeCAT), among others: former Catalan president Carles Puigdemont, former regional ministers Josep Rull, Jordi Turull and Laura Borràs or party vice-president Míriam Nogueras.

The party was merged into Puigdemont's new Together for Catalonia (Junts) on 19 July, after negotiations with the PDeCAT to form a joint list ahead of the next Catalan regional election foundered as a result of the latter's refusal to dissolve itself within JxCat. Overall, the Crida has been pointed out as unsuccessful in its main goal of uniting all pro-independence parties under its umbrella, with the party not having been fielded on its own to contest any single election, but its establishment and permanent stress on the PDeCAT has been said to help hasten the latter's internal crisis.

== History ==
The Crida was established as a political platform on 16 July 2018, with Carles Puigdemont, Quim Torra and Jordi Sànchez being the driving force behind its establishment. On 8 January 2019 it was registered as a political party in the interior ministry, and on 26 January it held its constituent congress.

Ahead of the April 2019 Spanish general election, party members voted against running on their own and in favour of joining a "unitary candidacy" of pro-independence parties together with the Catalan European Democratic Party (PDeCAT). Failure in negotiations between both the PDeCAT and Republican Left of Catalonia (ERC) for such a list ultimately ended in the Crida declaring that they would not contest the general election nor would formally supporting any candidacy, though it supported the participation of several of its members in the Together for Catalonia (JxCat) alliance.

After the November 2019 Spanish general election, the party intended to stage a refoundation of the post-Democratic Convergence of Catalonia political space, bringing together the three political entities resulting from CDC's demise—the PDeCAT, JxCat and itself—either as a joint entity or in the form of a coalition, The CNxR did not rule out running on its own in an eventual election if an agreement with the PDeCAT was not possible, as it ruled out dissolving itself into a mere continuation of CDC's legacy. Negotiations stalled as a result of the COVID-19 pandemic and resumed in June 2020.

On 8 July 2020, it was proposed that the party be merged and subsequently dissolved into Carles Puigdemont's upcoming party—a new Together for Catalonia—on 25 July. As the Crida before it, the new Together for Catalonia party—whose establishment was unveiled on 2 July 2020—aimed at reorganizing the post-CDC space and bring together supporters of unilateral independence ahead of the next Catalan regional election, but unlike the CNxR it was to break all ties with the PDeCAT, after negotiations failed between the former and the latter to merge themselves into a new political force under the umbrella of JxCat (whose naming rights belonged to the PDeCAT). The Crida held a vote among its members from 16 to 18 July to decide on its ultimate fate, including a proposal providing for its transformation into a foundation and think tank within Puigdemont's new party, with over 95% of party members approving of the merger.

== Ideology ==
With an ambition to unite social conservatives and left-wing supporters of Catalan independence, the party was a big tent and mass movement organisation with the main ideology of supporting Catalan independence and the establishment of a new Catalan Republic. It aims at serving as the umbrella for a single Catalan independence list, establishing a structure that mirrors the Scottish National Party, while some analysts have described it as "convergent peronism" and as a mixture of Chantal Mouffe's "populist moment and a reminiscence of the CDC's political project in the 1980s and 1990s which endep up identifying Jordi Pujol as the bulwark of Catalan nationalism. Former Catalan minister Ferran Mascarell argued that it intended to "transcend" political parties, whereas Together for Catalonia's spokesperson Gemma Geis claimed that it was "a tool" comprising "individual adhesions" and "not a political structure with party representative quotas". Internally, the party was said to possess three main ideological currents: left-wing, social democracy and liberalism.

Other pro-independence political parties, such as Republican Left of Catalonia (ERC) and the Popular Unity Candidacy (CUP), have repeatedly ruled out joining the CNxR, perceiving it as an hostile movement ultimately seeking to dilute them into Puigdemont's personal political project. Puigdemont's original party, the Catalan European Democratic Party (PDeCAT)—direct successor to the late CDC—was also resistant to dilute itself into the CNxR, despite the joint participation of PDeCAT and Crida members in the JxCat alliance contesting the 2019 two Spanish general elections, local elections and that year's European Parliament election.
