= Laura Vilagrà =

Spanish politician

The Honourable Laura Vilagrà MP
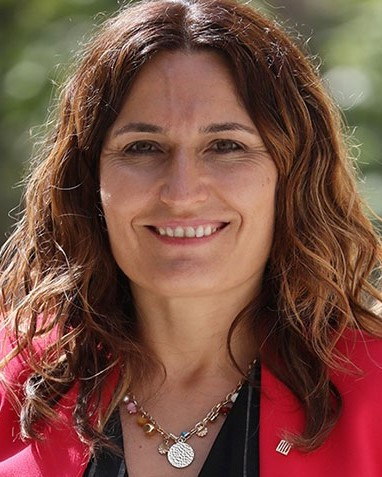
- Vilagrà in May 2021

Vice President of Catalonia
- In office 23 January 2024 – 12 August 2024
- President: Pere Aragonès
- Preceded by: Jordi Puigneró
- Succeeded by: Office disestablished

Minister of the Presidency of Catalonia
- In office 26 May 2021 – 12 August 2024
- President: Pere Aragonès
- Preceded by: Meritxell Budó
- Succeeded by: Albert Dalmau Miranda

Member of the Parliament of Catalonia
- In office 12 March 2021 – 13 January 2025
- Constituency: Barcelona
- In office 5 December 2006 – 28 June 2011
- Preceded by: Oriol Amorós i March
- Succeeded by: Violant Mascaró i López
- Constituency: Barcelona

Mayor of Santpedor
- In office 14 June 2003 – 13 June 2015
- Preceded by: Josep Santamans i Gubianas
- Succeeded by: Xavier Codina i Casas

Member of Santpedor Municipal Council
- In office 1999–2015

Personal details
- Born: Laura Vilagrà i Pons; 3 July 1976 (age 50) Santpedor, Catalonia, Spain
- Citizenship: Spanish
- Party: Republican Left of Catalonia
- Other political affiliations: Republican Left of Catalonia–Catalonia Yes
- Education: Autonomous University of Barcelona; ESADE

Laura Vilagrà i Pons (born 3 July 1976) is a Spanish politician from Catalonia, member of the Parliament of Catalonia and the current Minister of the Presidency of Catalonia.

== Early life ==
Vilagrà was born on 3 July 1976 in Santpedor, Catalonia. She has a degree in political science and administration from the Autonomous University of Barcelona and a master's degree in public management from ESADE. She joined Republican Left of Catalonia (ERC) in 1999.

== Career ==
Vilagrà worked as a political advisor to ERC municipal councillors. She was a member of Bages County Council from 1999 to 2003.

Vilagrà contested the 1999 local elections as an ERC candidate in Santpedor and was elected. She was re-elected at the 2003 local elections and became Mayor of Santpedor. She was re-elected at the 2007 and 2011 local elections.

At the 2006 regional election Vilagrà was placed 14th on ERC's list of candidates in the Province of Barcelona but the party only managed to win 11 seats in the province and as a result she failed to get elected. However, in December 2006, she was appointed to the Parliament of Catalonia following the resignation of Oriol Amorós i March. She was re-elected at the 2010 regional election. She resigned from Parliament in June 2011 due to increased workload and personal reasons.

At the 2012 regional election Vilagrà was placed 24th on the Republican Left of Catalonia–Catalonia Yes electoral alliance's list of candidates in the Province of Barcelona but the alliance only managed to win 12 seats in the province and as a result she failed to get elected.

Vilagrà was the Government of Catalonia's delegate in Central Catalonia from 2016 till the imposition of direct rule in 2017. She became manager of the Fundació Tutelar Santa Maria de Comabella in 2018. She was appointed manager of Bages County Council in 2019.

Vilagrà contested the 2021 regional election as an ERC candidate in the Province of Barcelona and was elected to the Parliament of Catalonia. On 26 May 2021 she was sworn in as Minister of the Presidency in the new government of President Pere Aragonès.

== Personal life ==
Vilagrà is a member of Òmnium Cultural and of the swimming club in Santpedor and has been a swimming instructor for many years. She is the mother of two daughters.

== Electoral history ==
Electoral history of Laura Vilagrà
| Election | Constituency | Party | Alliance | No. | Result |
|---|---|---|---|---|---|
| 1999 local | Santpedor | Republican Left of Catalonia | | 1 | Elected |
| 2003 local | Santpedor | Republican Left of Catalonia | Republican Left of Catalonia-Municipal Agreement | 1 | Elected |
| 2006 regional | Province of Barcelona | Republican Left of Catalonia | | 14 | Not elected |
| 2007 local | Santpedor | Republican Left of Catalonia | Republican Left of Catalonia-Municipal Agreement | 1 | Elected |
| 2010 regional | Province of Barcelona | Republican Left of Catalonia | | 4 | Elected |
| 2011 local | Santpedor | Republican Left of Catalonia | Republican Left of Catalonia-Municipal Agreement | 1 | Elected |
| 2012 regional | Province of Barcelona | Republican Left of Catalonia | Republican Left of Catalonia–Catalonia Yes | 24 | Not elected |
| 2021 regional | Province of Barcelona | Republican Left of Catalonia | | 2 | Elected |
