= Jordi Puigneró =

Spanish computer engineer and politician

The Honourable Jordi Puigneró CdSJ MP
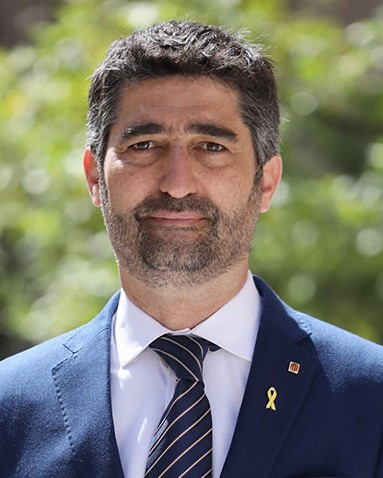
- Official portrait, 2021

Vice President of Catalonia
- In office 26 May 2021 – 29 September 2022
- President: Pere Aragonès
- Preceded by: Pere Aragonès (vacant between September 2020 and May 2021)

Minister of Digital Policies and Public Administration of Catalonia
- In office 2 June 2018 – 29 September 2022
- President: Pere Aragonès
- Preceded by: Meritxell Borràs (Direct rule from 27 October 2017)

Member of Sant Cugat del Vallès Municipal Council
- In office 2005–2015
- Preceded by: Jaume Tubau i Grau

Secretary of Telecommunications, Cybersecurity and the Digital Society of Catalonia
- In office 9 February 2016 – 29 May 2018
- Preceded by: Office established

Personal details
- Born: Jordi Puigneró Ferrer; 2 February 1974 (age 52) Sant Cugat del Vallès, Catalonia, Spain
- Party: Together for Catalonia
- Other political affiliations: Nationalist Youth of Catalonia
- Children: 2
- Education: University of Surrey
- Occupation: Computer engineer, author and politician
- Website: Generalitat de Catalunya

Jordi Puigneró Ferrer (Catalan pronunciation: [ˈʒɔɾði pudʒnəˈɾo fəˈre]; born 2 February 1974) is a Catalan IT engineer and politician. He served as Vice President of Spanish Autonomous Community of Catalonia and Minister of Digital Policies and Territory since May 2021 until 29 September 2022. He previously served between 2018 and 2021 as minister of Digital Policies and Public Administration of the Government of Catalonia. He is a member of Together for Catalonia (JUNTS) political party. He is considered the designer and architecture of the Catalan Digital Republic project.

== Early life ==
Puigneró was born on 2 February 1974 in Sant Cugat del Vallès, Catalonia. He joined the University of Surrey in 1992, graduating in 1997 with a master's degree in information systems.

== Career ==
Puigneró was a computer programmer/analyst at Deutsche Bank's IT department in Frankfurt from 1997 to 2000 and an information and communications technology consultant for IBM in Barcelona from 2000 to 2003. In 2003 he became chief-of-staff to Lluís Recoder, the mayor of Sant Cugat del Vallès. He was director-general of Telecommunications and the Information Society for the Generalitat de Catalunya from November 2013 to February 2016 when he was appointed Secretary of Telecommunications, Cybersecurity and Digital Society.

At the 2003 local elections Puigneró was placed 11th on the Convergence and Union (CiU) electoral alliance's list of candidates in Sant Cugat del Vallès but the alliance only managed to win 10 seats in the province and as a result he was not elected. However, following the death of Jaume Tubau i Grau he was appointed to the municipal council in September 2005. He was re-elected at the 2007 and 2011 local elections.

Puigneró was lead councillor for Institutional Relations, Participation and Civicism (2005–2011) and Communication, Internal Services and Innovation (2011). He was deputy mayor for Governance, Security, Mobility and Technology from 2011 to 2013. He was a member of the board of directors of LocalRet from 2007 to 2013. He was chairman of the Sant Cugat del Vallès branch of the Democratic Convergence of Catalonia (CDC) from 2009 to 2012. Puigneró did not contest the 2015 local elections but was placed third in the CiU's supplementary list of candidates in Sant Cugat del Vallès.

On 19 May 2018 newly elected President of Catalonia Quim Torra nominated a new government in which Puigneró was to be Minister of Digital Policies and Public Administration. He was sworn in on 2 June 2018 at the Palau de la Generalitat de Catalunya.

In July 2020 Puigneró joined the newly formed Together for Catalonia political party.

On 24 May 2021 he was named Vice President of Catalonia under the Aragonès Government and took office on 26 May, maintaining his position as Minister of Digital Policies and Public Administration.

== Personal life ==
Between 2012 and 2014 Puigneró climbed the ten peaks in Catalonia over 3,000m.

== Electoral history ==
Electoral history of Jordi Puigneró
Election	Constituency	Party	Alliance	No.	Result
2003 local	Sant Cugat del Vallès	Democratic Convergence of Catalonia	Convergence and Union	11	Not elected
2007 local	Sant Cugat del Vallès	Democratic Convergence of Catalonia	Convergence and Union	13	Elected
2011 local	Sant Cugat del Vallès	Democratic Convergence of Catalonia	Convergence and Union	7	Elected
