= Carles Campuzano =

Spanish politician (born 1964)

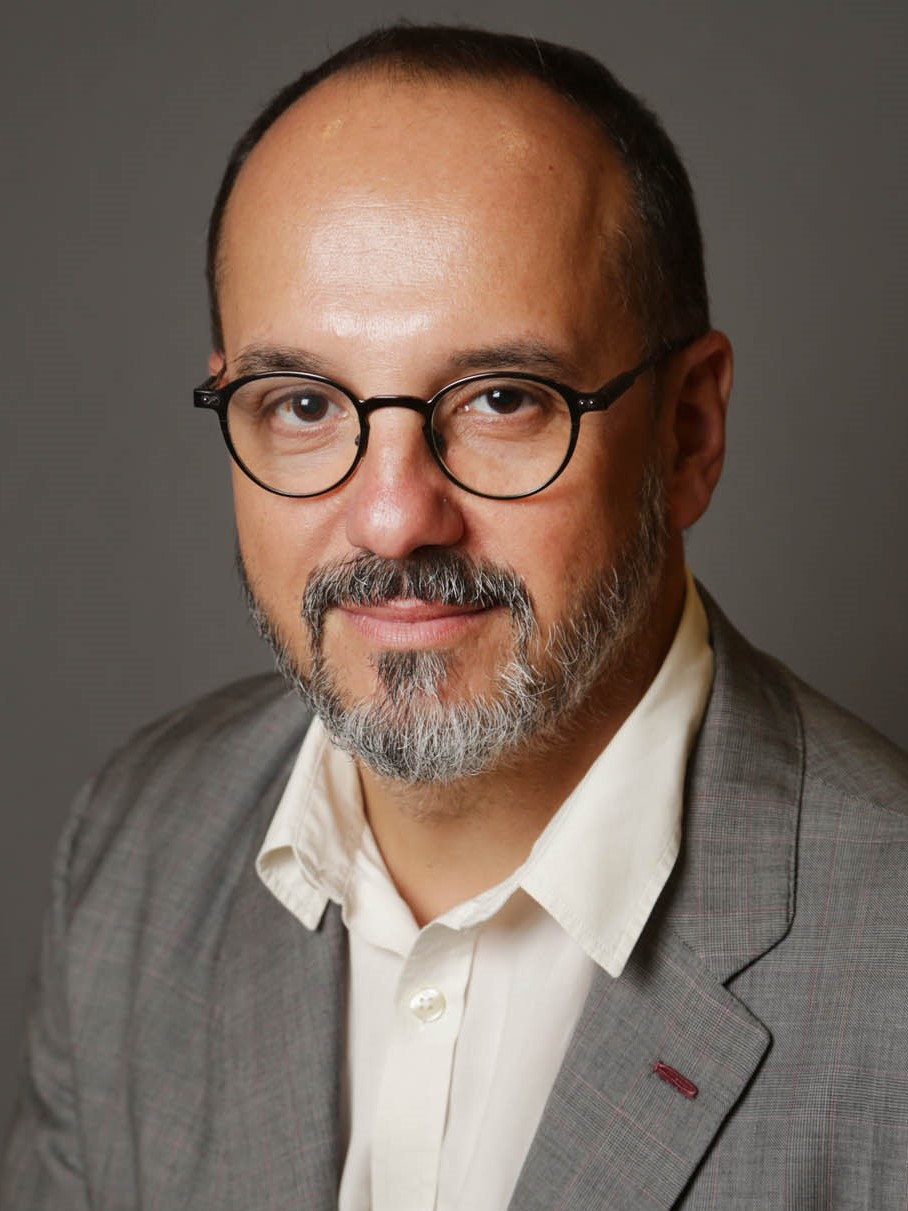
- Campuzano in November 2015

Minister of Social Rights of Catalonia
- In office 10 October 2022 – 12 August 2024
- President: Pere Aragonès
- Preceded by: Violant Cervera
- Succeeded by: Mónica Martínez Bravo

Member of the Congress of Deputies of Spain
- In office 20 March 1996 – 5 March 2019
- Constituency: Barcelona

Member of the Parliament of Catalonia
- Incumbent
- Assumed office 10 June 2024
- In office 3 April 1992 – 26 September 1995
- Constituency: Barcelona

Member of Vilanova i la Geltrú Municipal Council
- In office 1987–1991

Personal details
- Born: Carles Campuzano i Canadès; 12 July 1964 (age 62) Barcelona, Catalonia, Spain
- Party: CDC (1983–2016); PDeCAT (2016–20)
- Education: University of Barcelona
- carlescampuzano.cat

Carles Campuzano i Canadès (born 12 July 1964) is a Catalan politician and a former member of the Congress of Deputies of Spain and the Parliament of Catalonia.

== Early life and family ==
Campuzano was born on 12 July 1964 in Barcelona, Catalonia. He has a degree in law from the University of Barcelona. Campuzano joined the Nationalist Youth of Catalonia (JNC) in 1981 and was a member of its National Executive Committee from 1984 as well as its secretary-general (1989–94) and president (1994-96). He was one of the founders of the National Student Federation of Catalonia (Federació Nacional d'Estudiants de Catalunya, FNEC). Campuzano joined the Democratic Convergence of Catalonia (CDC) in 1983 and was a member its national council.

== Career ==
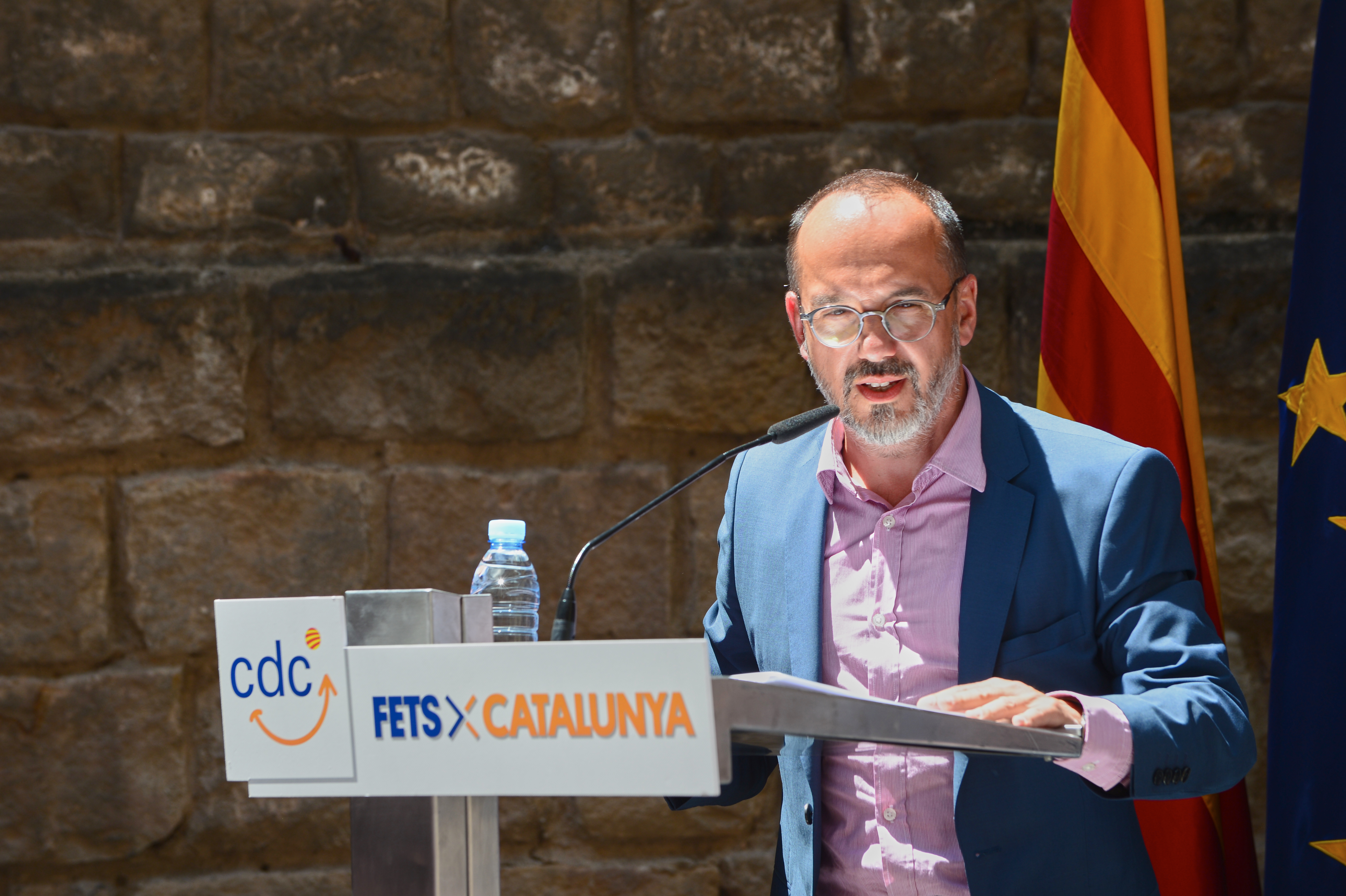
Campuzano at the CDC's "Defensem la nostra cultura" event on 21 June 2016

Campuzano worked as technical assistant in the Generalitat de Catalunya's Department of Presidency between 1986 and 1992.

Campuzano was a member of Vilanova i la Geltrú Municipal Council from 1987 to 1991 and Garraf County Council from 1991 to 1992. He contested the 1992 regional election as a Convergence and Union (CiU) electoral alliance candidate in the Province of Barcelona and was elected to the Parliament of Catalonia. Campuzano did not contest the 1995 regional election but was nominated as the CiU's number one substitute candidate in the Province of Barcelona.

Campuzano contested the 1996 general election as a CiU candidate in the Province of Barcelona and was elected to the Congress of Deputies. He was re-elected at the 2000, 2004, 2008, 2011, 2015 and 2016 general elections. Campuzano has been spokesperson for the Catalan European Democratic Party (PDeCAT) in the Congress of Deputies since April 2017 and was a member of the Spanish delegation in the Parliamentary Assembly of the Organization for Security and Cooperation in Europe (OSCE). Despite having been proposed by its party to be the main candidate of Together for Catalonia to seek the April 2019 Spanish general election, he wouldn't be chosen in the end, being replaced by Laura Borràs as the main candidate by Barcelona. Eventually, Carles Campuzano announced that he would be leaving the PDeCAT because of differences on its political ideology and project.

Campuzano is chairman of the Associació Catalana de Solidaritat i Ajuda als Refugiats (Catalan Association of Solidarity and Refugee Aid, ACSAR Foundation) and a member of Òmnium Cultural, Greenpeace and Obra Cultural Balear de Mallorca.

== Electoral history ==
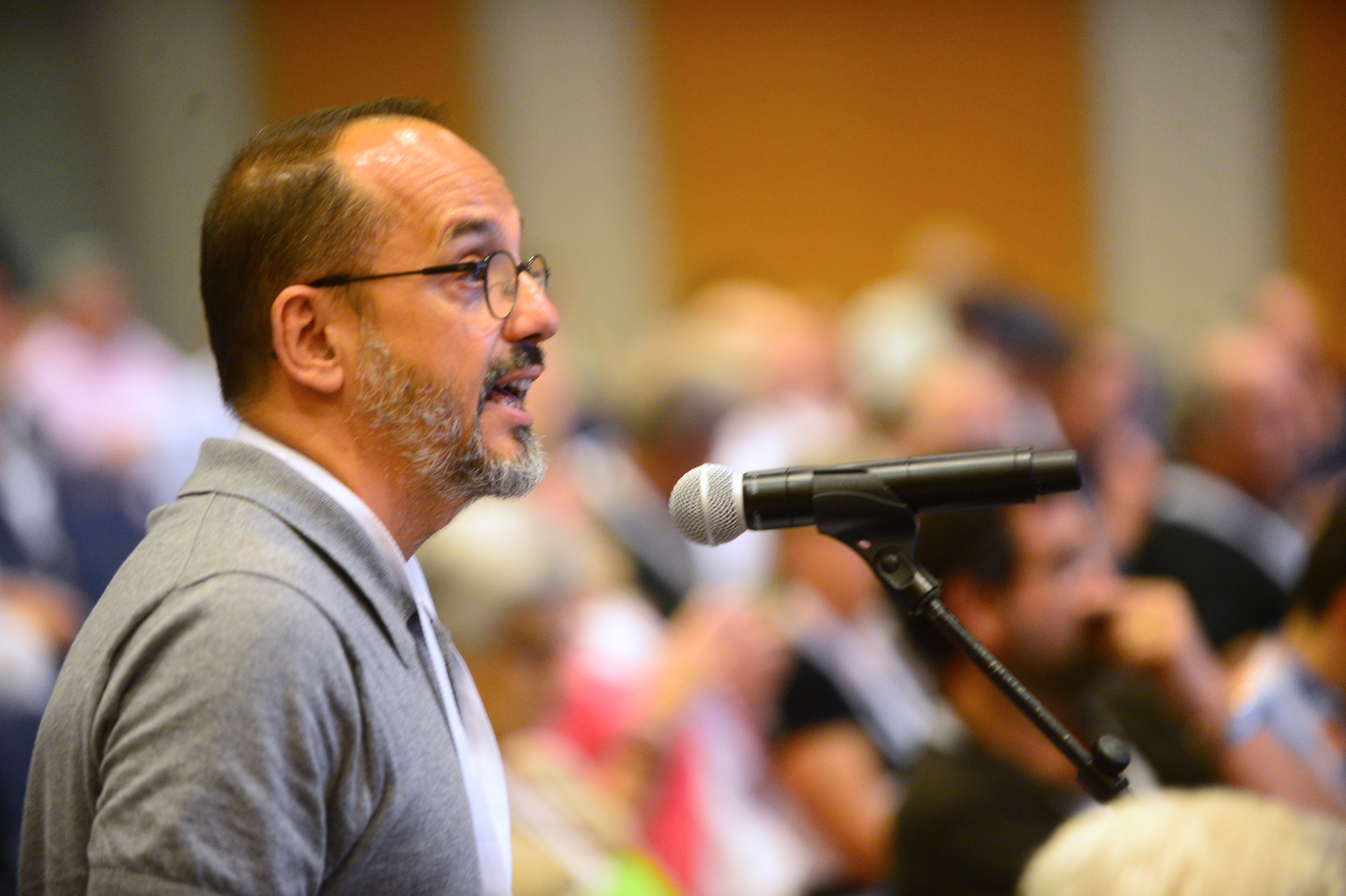
Campuzano addresses the PDeCAT's founding congress on 9 July 2016

Electoral history of Carles Campuzano
Election	Constituency	Party	Alliance	No.	Result
1987 local	Vilanova i la Geltrú	Democratic Convergence of Catalonia	Convergence and Union		Elected
1992 regional	Province of Barcelona	Democratic Convergence of Catalonia	Convergence and Union	39	Elected
1996 general	Province of Barcelona	Democratic Convergence of Catalonia	Convergence and Union	6	Elected
2000 general	Province of Barcelona	Democratic Convergence of Catalonia	Convergence and Union	6	Elected
2004 general	Province of Barcelona	Democratic Convergence of Catalonia	Convergence and Union	4	Elected
2008 general	Province of Barcelona	Democratic Convergence of Catalonia	Convergence and Union	4	Elected
2011 general	Province of Barcelona	Democratic Convergence of Catalonia	Convergence and Union	4	Elected
2015 general	Province of Barcelona	Democratic Convergence of Catalonia	Democracy and Freedom	2	Elected
2016 general	Province of Barcelona	Democratic Convergence of Catalonia		2	Elected
