= Jaume Giró =

Catalan journalist (born 1964)

The Honourable Jaume Giró
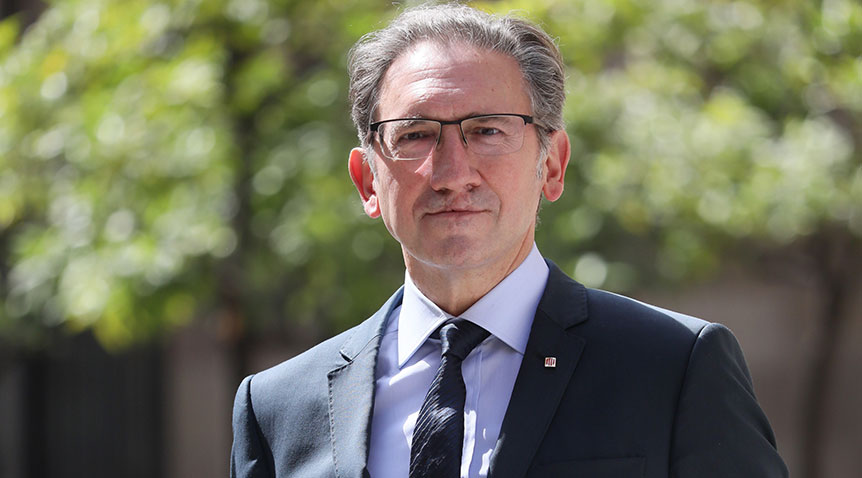
- Giró in May 2021

Minister of Economy and Finance of Catalonia
- In office 26 May 2021 – 7 October 2022
- President: Pere Aragonès
- Preceded by: Pere Aragonès
- Succeeded by: Natàlia Mas

Member of the Parliament of Catalonia
- In office 10 June 2024 – 4 September 2025
- Succeeded by: Laura Martínez Portell
- Constituency: Barcelona

Personal details
- Born: Jaume Giró i Ribas; 1964 (age 61–62) Badalona, Catalonia, Spain
- Education: University of Navarra
- Occupation: Corporate executive
- Website: giroconsultants.com

Jaume Giró i Ribas (born 1964) is a Catalan journalist, corporate executive and the current Minister of Economy and Finance of Catalonia.

== Early life ==
Giró was born in 1964 in Badalona, Catalonia, Spain. He has a degree in information sciences from the University of Navarra (1982–87) and a diploma in business administration and management from ESADE (1992–93). During his time at the universities he worked for the Diario de Navarra and La Vanguardia newspapers.

== Career ==
Giró joined Europa Press in 1987, initially as an editor and later as head of the economics section in Barcelona. He became head of communications at Catalana de Gas in 1990 and in June 1991, following the merger of Catalana de Gas and Gas Madrid, he was appointed director of external relations at Gas Natural. He was promoted to corporate director of external relations at Gas Natural Group in 1994. In November 2004 he was appointed director-general of communication and the presidency of Repsol. He was also president of Petrocat (May 2007 to June 2010) and director of Petronor (April 2007 to April 2009).

Between March 2009 and June 2014 he was executive director of communication, brand, sponsorships and institutional relations, and later deputy director-general of communication, at CaixaBank. He became director-general of La Caixa Foundation in June 2014 but left in 2019 due to disagreements with its president Isidre Fainé, including moving the bank's headquarters outside of Catalonia, which Giró opposed, following the 2017 Catalan independence referendum (1-O). He currently runs a consultancy firm providing various services including lobbying. On 26 May 2021 he was sworn in as Minister of Economy and Finance in the new government of President Pere Aragonès.

In addition to his corporate work, Giró has taught business communication at the Autonomous University of Barcelona and ESADE's Madrid campus, and for the joint University of Barcelona-Columbia University Graduate School of Journalism master of journalism BCNY program. He was awarded the Premio Catalunya de Comunicación by the Catalan Association for Communication and Public Relations (Asociación Catalana de Comunicación y Relaciones Públicas) in 2005. In 2007 he was awarded an honorary doctorate by the ESERP Business School for his two decade work in the energy and communication sectors.

Giró was president of the Corporate Excellence (Center for Reputation Leadership) think tank, member of the board of directors of the Societat Econòmica Barcelonesa d’Amics del País (SEBAP) and vice-president of the Asociación de Directivos de Comunicación (DIRCOM). Between 2004 and 2009 he was a member of the executive committee of the Comité Ejecutivo del Club Español de la Energía (Enerclub). Between 2017 and 2019 he was president of the patronage council of the Liceu opera house. He is the editor of The New Barcelona Post and a close associate of FC Barcelona president Joan Laporta.

== Personal life ==
Giró is married and has three daughters.
