= Pere Aragonès =

Catalan lawyer and politician (born 1982)

The Right Honourable Pere Aragonès
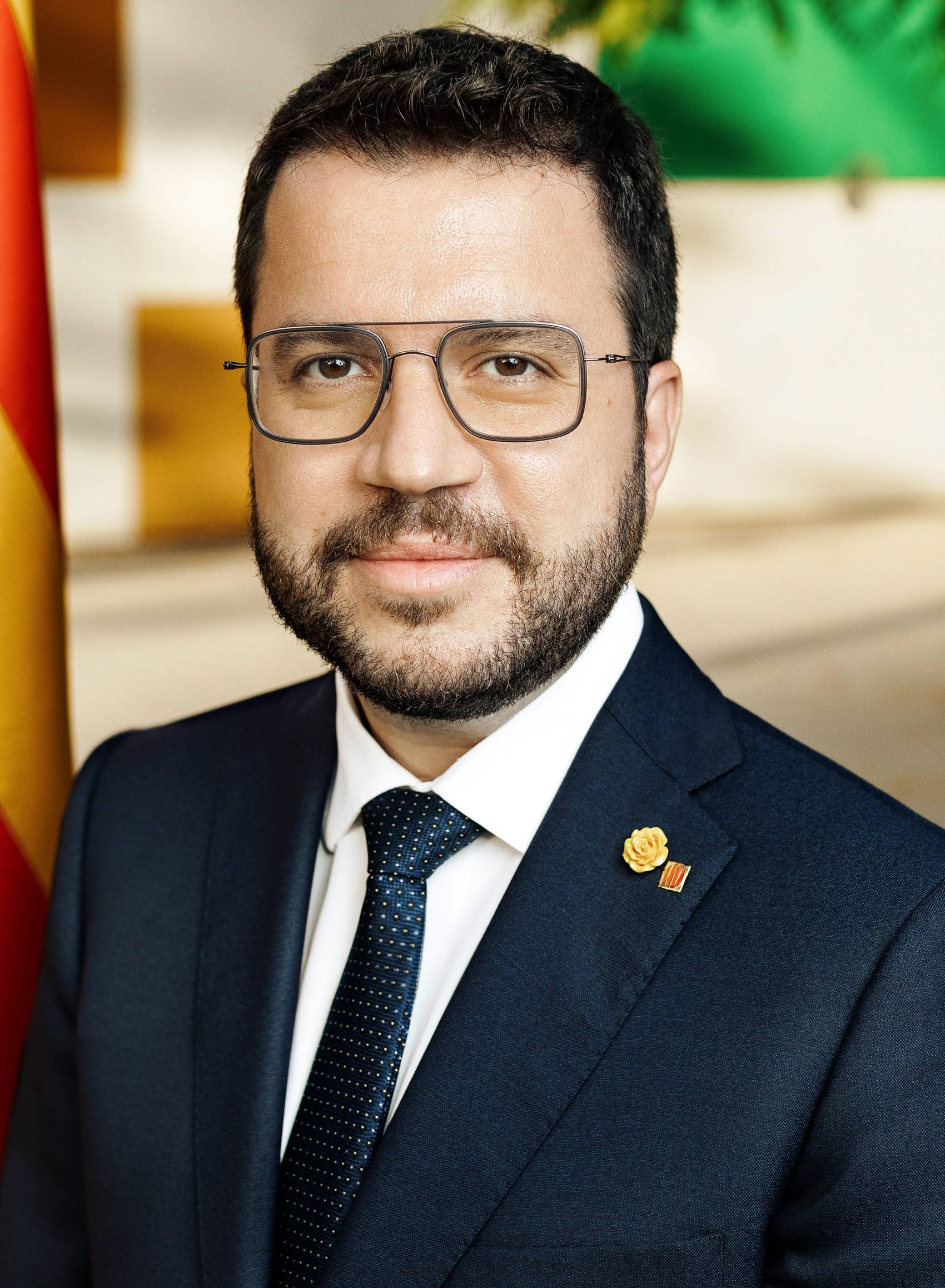
- Official portrait, 2021

132nd President of the Government of Catalonia
- In office 24 May 2021 – 10 August 2024 (Acting: 29 September 2020 – 24 May 2021)
- Monarch: Felipe VI
- Vice President: Jordi Puigneró; Laura Vilagrà
- Preceded by: Quim Torra
- Succeeded by: Salvador Illa

Vice President of Catalonia
- In office 2 June 2018 – 24 May 2021
- President: Quim Torra
- Preceded by: Oriol Junqueras (Direct rule from 27 October 2017)
- Succeeded by: Jordi Puigneró

Minister of Economy and Finance of Catalonia
- In office 2 June 2018 – 24 May 2021
- President: Quim Torra
- Preceded by: Oriol Junqueras (Direct rule from 27 October 2017)
- Succeeded by: Jaume Giró

Member of the Parliament of Catalonia
- In office 12 March 2021 – 19 March 2024
- Constituency: Barcelona
- In office 5 December 2006 – 21 January 2016
- Preceded by: Josep Huguet
- Succeeded by: Maria Assumpta Rosell i Medall
- Constituency: Barcelona

Member of Pineda de Mar Municipal Council
- In office 11 June 2011 – 26 April 2018
- Succeeded by: Meritxell Mateu Estopa

Personal details
- Born: Pere Aragones i Garcia; 16 November 1982 (age 43) Pineda de Mar, Catalonia, Spain
- Citizenship: Spanish
- Party: Republican Left of Catalonia
- Education: Open University of Catalonia; University of Barcelona
- Occupation: Lawyer, academic
- Website: Official website

Pere Aragonès i Garcia (Catalan pronunciation: [ˈpeɾə əɾəɣuˈnɛz i ɣərˈsiə]; born 16 November 1982) is a Catalan lawyer and former politician who served as President of the Government of Catalonia from 2021 to 2024. He previously served between 2018 and 2021 as Vice President and Minister of Economy and Finance of Catalonia, as well as Acting President between September 2020 and May 2021. He is a member of the Republican Left of Catalonia (ERC) political party.

Born in 1982 in Pineda de Mar, Aragonès studied law at the Open University of Catalonia and economics at the University of Barcelona before becoming a lawyer and an academic. He was a member of the Parliament of Catalonia from December 2006 to January 2016 when he was appointed Secretary of Economy in the Catalan government. He was a member of the municipal council in Pineda de Mar from May 2011 to April 2018 and was appointed Vice President and Minister of Economy and Finance of Catalonia in June 2018.

== Early life ==
Aragonès was born on 16 November 1982 in Pineda de Mar, Catalonia, Spain. His grandfather Josep Aragonés i Montsant, a textile businessman and real estate tycoon, also served as the mayor of his hometown during the Francoist dictatorship, continuing in the post throughout the Transition as a member of Democratic Reform of Catalonia and People's Alliance up until 1987. In the 1990s, his father served as municipal councillor for Convergence and Union in Pineda. He has a degree in law from the Open University of Catalonia and a master's degree in economic history from the University of Barcelona (UB). He has also studied public policy and economic development at the Harvard University's Kennedy School of Government. He is currently studying for a Ph.D. in economic history from UB.

Aragonès joined the Young Republican Left of Catalonia, the youth wing of the Republican Left of Catalonia, in 1998 and was its national spokesperson from 2003 to 2007. He joined ERC in 2000. He has been a member of ERC's executive since 2003 and is currently number three in the party. He is also a member of the Òmnium Cultural.

== Career ==
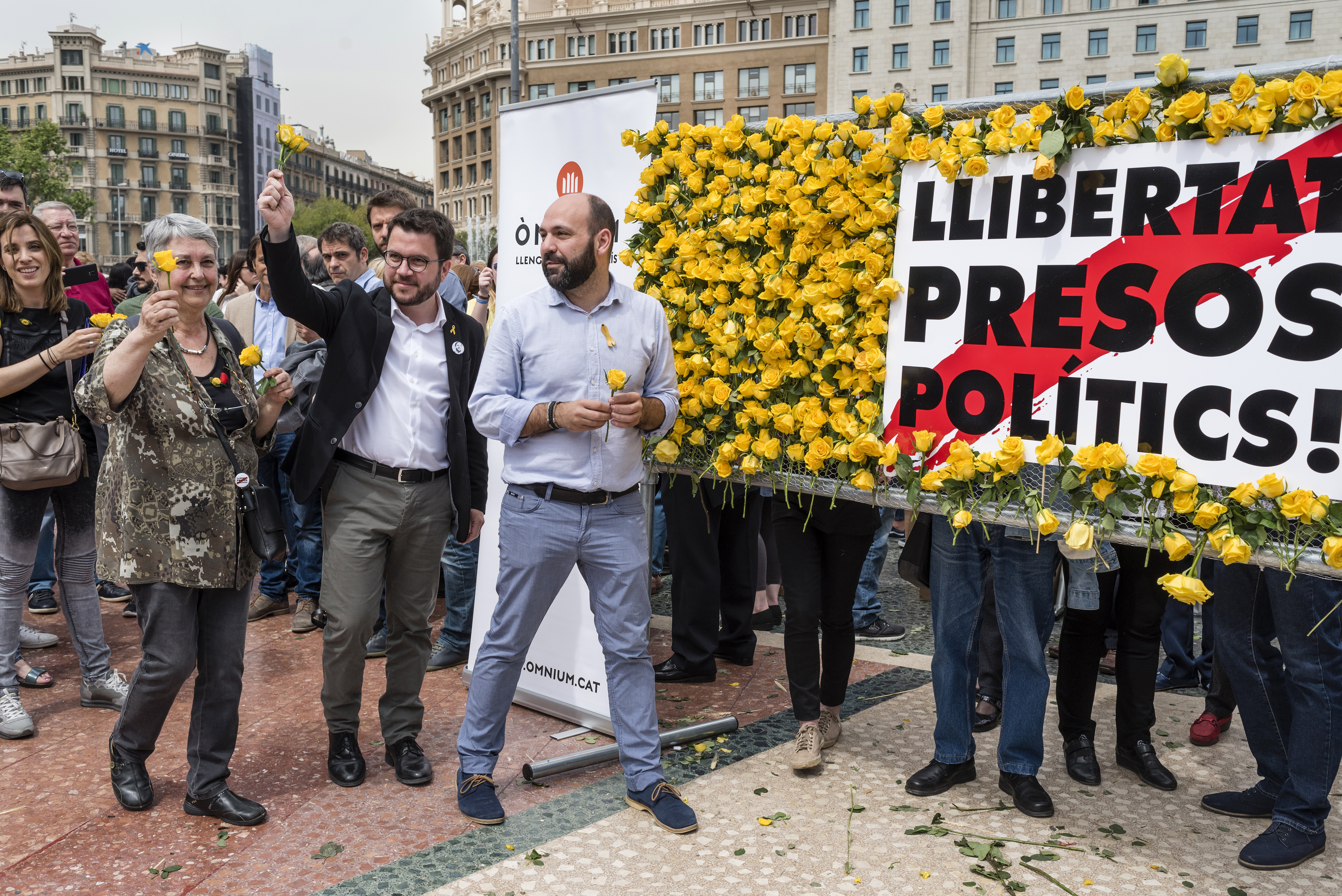
Aragonès at a Saint George's Day event on 23 April 2018

Aragonès worked at a law firm specialising in corporate and public administration law. He was a researcher at the Institut Ignasi Villalonga d'Economia i Empresa and an associate professor at the University of Perpignan. In January 2016 he was appointed the Generalitat de Catalunya's Secretary of Economy.

At the 2003 regional election Aragonès was placed 38th on the Republican Left of Catalonia's list of candidates in the Province of Barcelona but the party only won 13 seats in the province, and as a result he was not elected. At the 2006 regional election he was placed 12th on the ERC's list of candidates in the Province of Barcelona but the party only won 11 seats in the province and as a result he was not elected again. In December 2006, he was appointed to the Parliament of Catalonia following the resignation of Josep Huguet.

Aragonès was placed 7th on ERC's list of candidates 2010 in the Province of Barcelona and, although the party only won six seats in the province, he was re-elected after the second placed candidate Ernest Benach declined to take his seat in the Catalan parliament. He was re-elected at the 2012 and 2015 regional elections. He resigned from parliament upon being appointed Secretary of Economy.

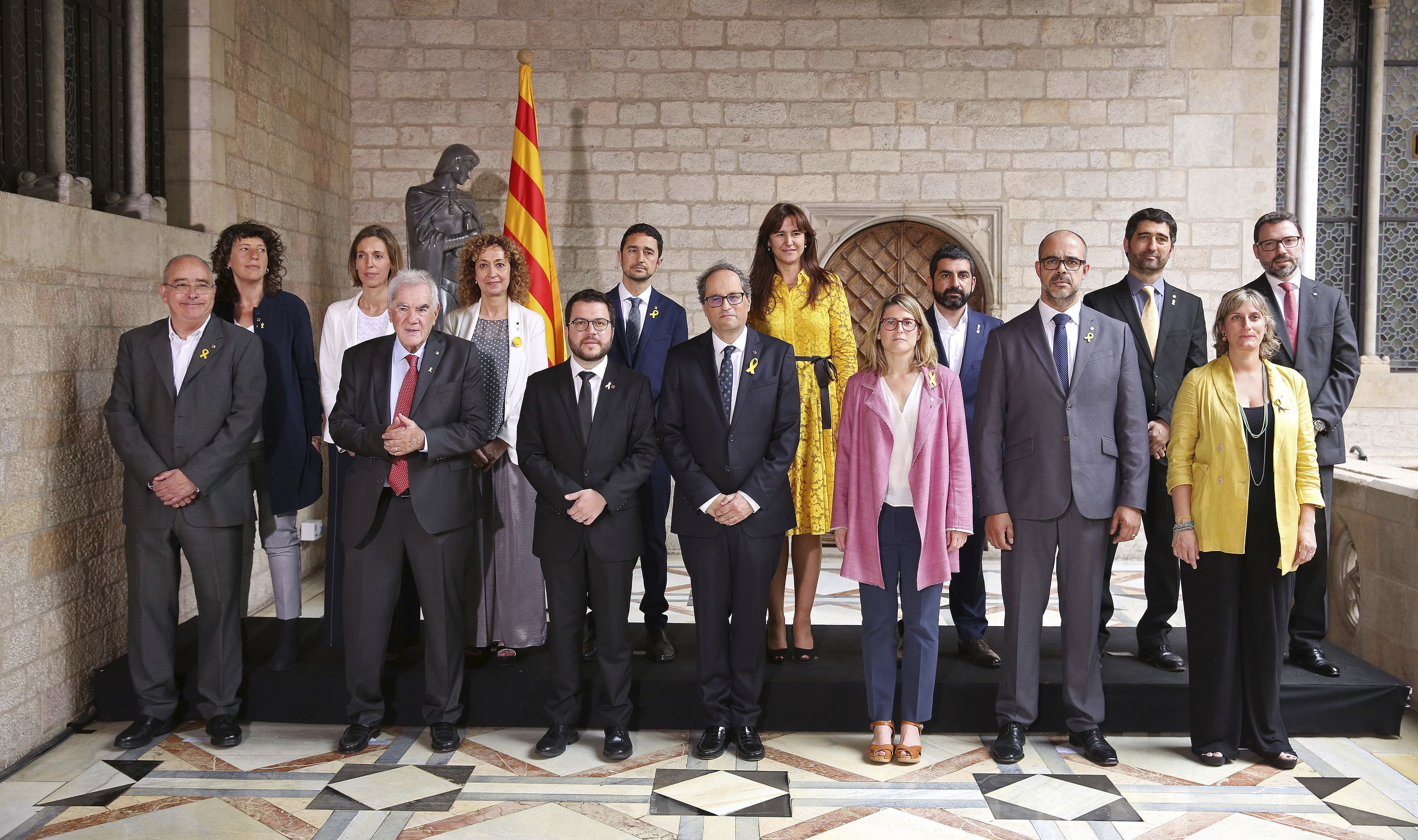
Aragonès and other members of the Catalan government on 2 June 2018

Aragonès contested the 2011 local elections as a Republican Left of Catalonia-Junts per Pineda-Acord Municipal (ERC-JP-AM) electoral alliance candidate in Pineda de Mar and was elected. He was re-elected at the 2015 local elections. He resigned from Pineda de Mar Municipal Council in April 2018.

On 19 May 2018, newly elected President of Catalonia Quim Torra nominated a new government in which Aragonès was to be Vice President and Minister of Economy and Finance. He was sworn in on 2 June 2018 at the Palau de la Generalitat de Catalunya.

On 15 March 2020 Aragonès announced on Twitter that he had contracted COVID-19 during the COVID-19 pandemic in Spain.

On 28 September 2020, following the rule issued by the Spanish Supreme Court that barred President of Catalonia Joaquim Torra from chairing any public office, he assumed the position as acting President of the region.

== Presidency ==
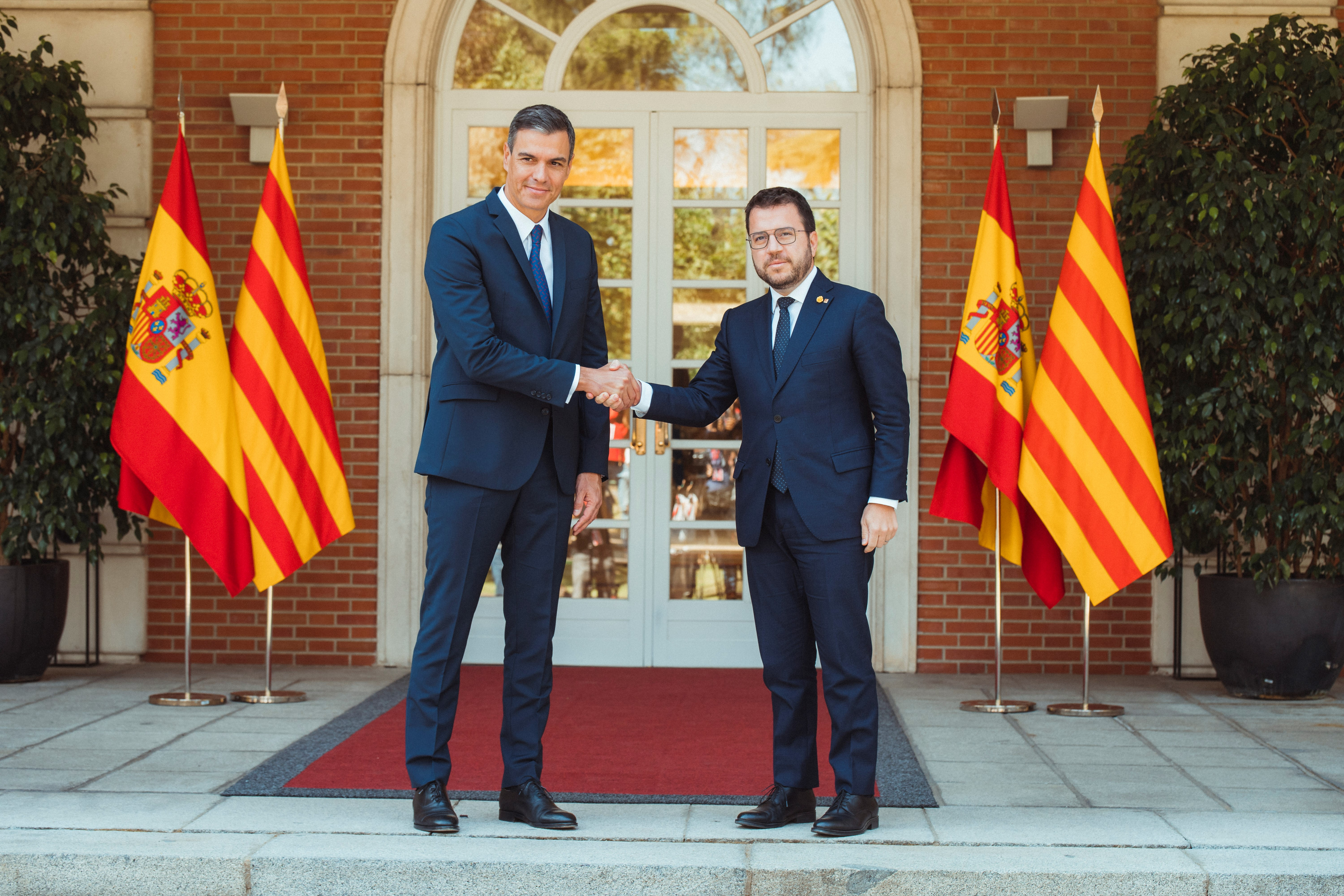
Aragonès with Spanish Prime Minister Pedro Sánchez on 15 July 2022

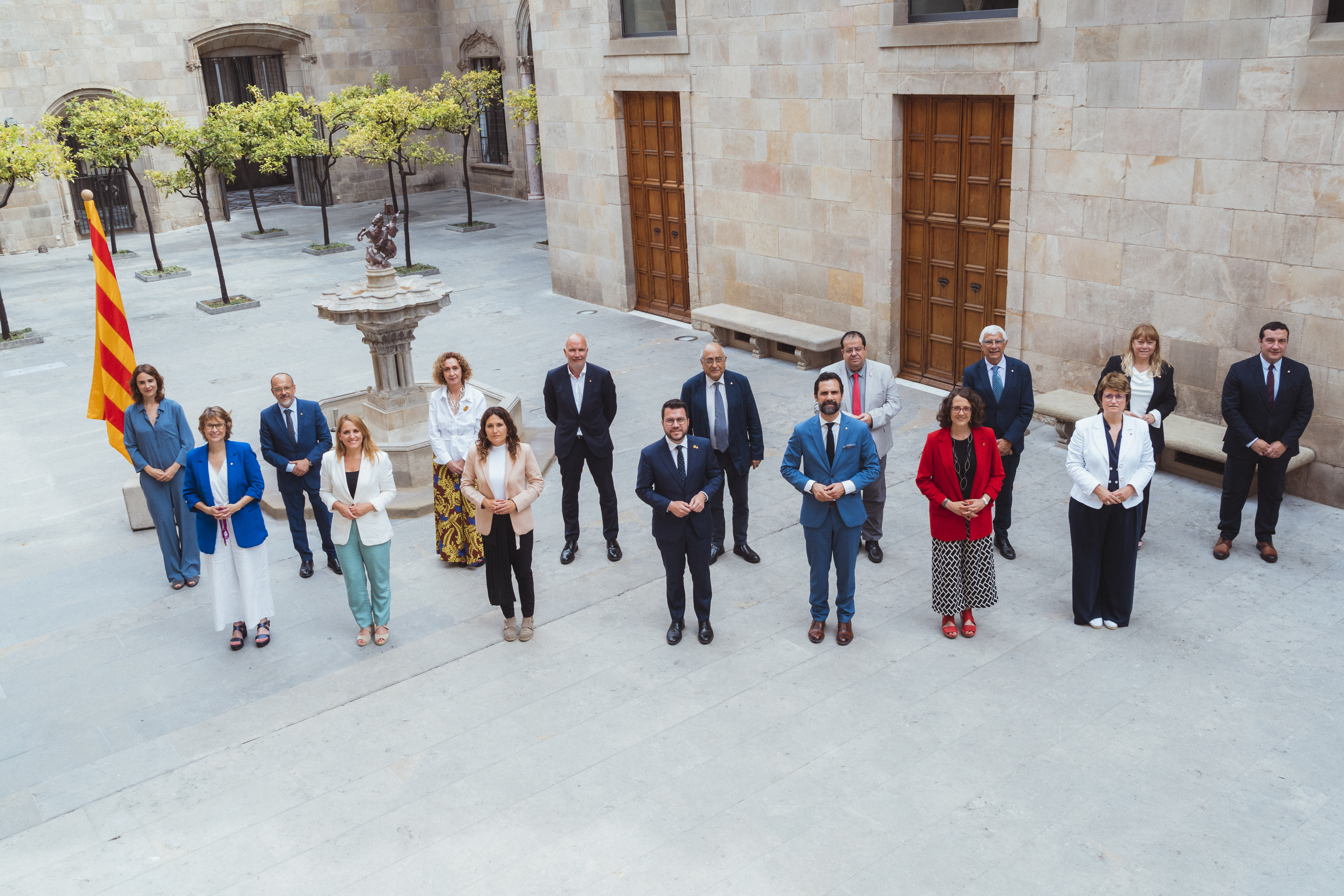
Aragonès late government (2023)

On 21 May 2021, after the 2021 Catalan elections and an agreement with Junts, he became the first President of Catalonia from Esquerra Republicana since Josep Tarradellas in the 1980s.

In June 2021, he welcomed the decision by Pedro Sánchez to pardon those convicted for the 2017 independence attempt but said that he would pursue amnesty for all those involved in that year's events, which would benefit over 3,000 people. Among the many measures, a "dialogue table" between the Catalan and Spanish governments to advance in the resolution of the political conflict was announced, though it would later go on to prove little to no effective.

In October 2022, the coalition government collapsed mainly due to internal skirmishes over the strategy to achieve independence between the two ruling coalition parties that had been brewing during all that year, leaving ERC with a minority government with the external support of the Socialists' Party of Catalonia.

During the 2023 Spanish government formation, ERC and the Spanish Socialist Worker's Party reached a deal to lead the "integral transfer" of the Spanish government operated Rodalies de Catalunya commuter rail to the Catalan Government. The negotiations for the transfer would go on to extend to the Illa administration.

In March 2024, he called for a snap election after the Parliament of Catalonia failed to pass the Government's yearly budget. The pro-independence camp would go on to lose parliamentary majority for the first time since 2012, with Aragonès announcing his retirement from politics the day after the election.

== Electoral history ==
Electoral history of Pere Aragonès
| Election | Constituency | Party | Alliance | No. | Result |
|---|---|---|---|---|---|
| 2003 regional | Province of Barcelona | Republican Left of Catalonia | | 38 | Not elected |
| 2006 regional | Province of Barcelona | Republican Left of Catalonia | | 12 | Not elected |
| 2010 regional | Province of Barcelona | Republican Left of Catalonia | | 7 | Elected |
| 2011 local | Pineda de Mar | Republican Left of Catalonia | Republican Left of Catalonia—Junts per Pineda-Acord Municipal | 1 | Elected |
| 2012 regional | Province of Barcelona | Republican Left of Catalonia | Republican Left of Catalonia–Catalonia Yes | 8 | Elected |
| 2015 local | Pineda de Mar | Republican Left of Catalonia | Republican Left of Catalonia—Junts per Pineda-Acord Municipal | 1 | Elected |
| 2015 regional | Province of Barcelona | Republican Left of Catalonia | Junts pel Sí | 21 | Elected |
| 2021 regional | Province of Barcelona | Republican Left of Catalonia | Republican Left of Catalonia | 1 | Elected |
| 2024 regional | Province of Barcelona | Republican Left of Catalonia | Republican Left of Catalonia | 1 | Elected (resigned) |
