= Together for Catalonia (2020) =

Together for Catalonia Junts per Catalunya
- Abbreviation: JxCat; Junts
- President: Carles Puigdemont
- Secretary-General: Jordi Turull
- Vice Presidents: Anna Erra; Josep Rius; Francesc de Dalmases; Aurora Madaula
- Founder: Carles Puigdemont
- Founded: 18 July 2020
- Registered: 11 July 2018
- Split from: Catalan European Democratic Party
- Preceded by: Together for Catalonia (2017)
- Headquarters: Passatge de Bofill, 9; 08013, Barcelona, Catalonia, Spain
- Youth wing: Nationalist Youth of Catalonia
- Membership (2024): ▲6,583
- Ideology: Catalan independence; Populism
- Political position: Centre-right
- European affiliation: European Democratic Party
- European Parliament group: Non-Inscrits
- Colours: Turquoise
- Slogan: Junts, per Catalunya ('Together, for Catalonia')
- Members: See list of members
- Congress of Deputies (Catalan seats): 7 / 48
- Senate (Catalan seats): 4 / 24
- European Parliament (Spanish seats): 0 / 61
- Parliament of Catalonia: 34 / 135
- Mayors: 334 / 947
- Town councilors: 2,683 / 9,139
- County councils: 20 / 40
- County councilors: 321 / 1,028

Website
- junts.cat
- Politics of Catalonia; Political parties; Elections; A: The party has also been described as a big tent/catch-all party.

Together for Catalonia (Catalan: Junts per Catalunya, JxCat), often shortened to Junts (Catalan: [ˈʒuns]), is a Catalan pro-independence and populist political party that sits on the centre-right of the political spectrum. It is the second-largest party in the Parliament of Catalonia, holding 35 of the 135 seats. The current party president since 2024 is Carles Puigdemont.

Junts was established in July 2020 by former Catalan President Carles Puigdemont, as a result of his rupture with the Catalan nationalist Catalan European Democratic Party (PDeCAT). The party adopted the name of the homonym alliance, founded in 2017 and held its founding congress between 25 July and 3 October 2020. The party soon divided between the most moderate separatist faction formed by former members of the PDeCAT and those more radical who came from the civil society.

The new Together for Catalonia was formed by the merger of the National Call for the Republic (CNxR), the Action for the Republic (AxR), The Greens–Green Alternative (EV–AV) and splinter elements from the PDeCAT such as Independence Rally (RI.cat), but it also aims at the eventual incorporation of members from the Democrats of Catalonia (DC) and the Popular Unity Candidacy (CUP) parties. The party is to co-exist with the old Together for Catalonia alliance as a result of the Puigdemont–PDeCAT clash over the trademark's property rights, with those of the party having been taken over by the former but the latter still retaining the rights over the electoral coalition and the public funding.

Ahead of the 2024 Catalan regional election, the party announced that it would run under the Together+Carles Puigdemont for Catalonia platform (abbreviated as Cat–Junts+ or Junts+, Catalan: Junts+Carles Puigdemont per Catalunya).

== History ==
Convergence and Union (CiU), a Catalan nationalist alliance between the liberal Democratic Convergence of Catalonia (CDC) and the Christian democratic Democratic Union of Catalonia (UDC), had been the dominant political force in Catalonia since the Transition, having governed from 1980 to 2003 under Jordi Pujol. In 2010, CiU returned to the government under the leadership of Artur Mas, who embraced the pro-independence movement following the 2012 Diada. In the run-up to the 2015 regional election, CDC formed a joint list with other pro-independence parties, whereas UDC members narrowly voted to run independently, effectively dissolving CiU. The pro-independence faction of the UDC split and established Democrats of Catalonia (DC), joining the CDC and Republican Left of Catalonia (ERC), among others, to form Junts pel Sí (JxSí).

Ultimately, JxSí fell short of a majority in the election and the Popular Unity Candidacy (CUP) forced Mas to step down, leading to the election of Carles Puigdemont as President of Catalonia. In 2016, CDC was re-founded into the Catalan European Democratic Party (PDeCAT) in an attempt to distance itself from the corruption scandals involving CDC and elected Mas president of the party.

The government of Puigdemont held the 2017 Catalan independence referendum, which culminated in the unilateral Declaration of independence of Catalonia and the removal of Puigdemont and his government, with the central government calling for an early election on 21 December. Following the rupture of JxSí, the PDeCAT chose Puigdemont—who had chosen to self-exile himself in Belgium to escape from the Spanish judiciary—as their leading candidate. In November 2017, Puigdemont launched an electoral list under the name Together for Catalonia (JuntsxCat), comprising independents close to Puigdemont and members of the PDeCAT, but exluding the leadership of the party.

The election saw JuntsxCat becoming the main pro-independence force in the parliament, slightly ahead of ERC. The alliance's success in the election resulted in an increase of influence for Puigdemont within both the PDeCAT and the pro–Catalan independence camp, but his establishment of the National Call for the Republic (CNxR) as a rallying force for pro-independence parties would not achieve the expected results. Concurrently, the PDeCAT registered the trademark of Together for Catalonia as a political party on 11 July 2018, associated with the JxCat alliance but with not separate political activity at the time.

From 2019, negotiations between the PDeCAT and Puigdemont's CNxR would ensue for the reorganization of the post-convergent space under the "Together for Catalonia" umbrella, but the former's insistence on refusing to dissolve itself as a party would lead to Puigdemont breaking ties with the PDeCAT and announcing the foundation of a new party on 2 July 2020, with its founding congress starting telematically on 25 July and scheduled to last until 3 October. The new party's name, intending to make use of the "Together for Catalonia" label, sparked another conflict with the PDeCAT as the latter held the ownership rights over the trademark. Puigdemont's supporters within the PDeCAT took it over on 10 July by changing the registration data in the interior ministry to reflect its new ownership, but the change did not affect the electoral coalition comprising the PDeCAT nor its electoral rights, which Puigdemont's party renounced to use.

The new party unveiled its logo and corporate identity on 18 July, presented by Elsa Artadi and Marta Madrenas. Joan Canadell, the president of the Barcelona Chamber of Commerce, voiced his openness to collaborating with the new organization, although he claimed he did not see himself leading a future list at the ballots. Jordi Puigneró, incumbent regional minister of Digital Policies and Public Administration, had been also commented as a potential candidate for Junts in a future regional election in a list to be symbolically led by Puigdemont. The party was joined by Independence Rally (RI.cat) on 24 July, which broke the collaboration agreement under which it had been allied with CDC/PDeCAT since 2013.

From 29 August onwards and starting with the party's five senators, members from the PDeCAT aligned with Puigdemont started defecting en masse from the former, in response to it announcing a formal lawsuit against Puigdemont for taking over the JxCat's brand, with Puigdemont himself forfeiting his PDeCAT membership on 31 August.

== Composition ==
Party	Notes
National Call for the Republic (CNxR)	Merged in July 2020.
Action for the Republic (AxR)	Merged with Left Movement in November 2025.
Independence Rally (RI.cat)	
Left Independentists (IdE)	
The Greens–Green Alternative (EV–AV)	Left in 2020.
Democrats of Catalonia (DC)	Joined in December 2020.
Left Movement (MES)	Joined in December 2020.
Catalan Solidarity for Independence (SI)	Left in March 2024.
Catalan State	Joined in March 2024.
Republican Youth of Lleida (JRL)	Joined in March 2024.

== Ideology ==
The party's overall political stance was laid out in the manifestos launched by independents within the parliamentary Together for Catalonia (JxCat) together with several PDeCAT elected members during the final stages of the failed negotiations between the PDeCAT and Puigdemont. Aside of urging for the reorganization of the post-convergent space under the umbrella of "Together for Catalonia", the manifestos advocated for the defense of the right to self-determination, the unilateral enforcement of the "1 October commitment" to Catalan independence and a goal to "bring together the central current of Catalanism—today mostly pro-independence—with the articulation of a social, economic and modernizing agenda of a country small in size but large in aspirations", while advancing towards democratic souverainism, direct democracy and the fight against corruption.

One of the reasons cited for the breakup of negotiations between the PDeCAT and Puigdemont was on the issue of ideology, as the former—advocating for a project in the political centre ground—considered that Puigdemont's platform had drifted to the left-wing of the political spectrum in recent times. Paris Grau, associate professor of Political and Constitutional System in the University of Barcelona, commented on the new party promoted by Puigdemont by stating that, while it had been common for pro-independence parties to show different levels of support on the issue—ranging from unilateralism to more bilateral solutions inspired by the "Scottish way"—a new, unexpected situation was unveiling as "some of those [parties] who have been representative of the centre-right in Catalonia are increasingly revealing themselves more supportive of appealing to the centre-left or left-wing", in what he considered a clear move to dispute voters to Republican Left of Catalonia (ERC).

In an extraordinary assembly held on 19 July 2020, the small Action for the Republic party voted in favour of urging its members to "individually" join Junts and "actively participate in the process of constituting the new party", ideologically describing Junts as an organization "of progressive values, in the ideological big tent axis of [Catalonia's] centre-left majority, and decidedly republican".

Multiple sources refer to the party as being centre-right on the political spectrum. In 2022 and 2023, there have been a lesser number of sources that have called the party right-wing.

== Leadership ==
Portrait	Name (Birth–Death)	Term of office			Secretary-General (Tenure)
Portrait	Name (Birth–Death)	Took office	Left office	Duration	Secretary-General (Tenure)
	Carles Puigdemont (born 1962)	9 August 2020	4 June 2022	1 year and 299 days	Jordi Sànchez (2020–2022)
	Laura Borràs (born 1970)	4 June 2022	27 October 2024	2 years and 145 days	Jordi Turull (2022–present)
	Carles Puigdemont (born 1962)	27 October 2024	Incumbent	2 years and 23 days	Jordi Turull (2022–present)

== Electoral performance ==
=== Parliament of Catalonia ===
Parliament of Catalonia
Election	Leading candidate	Votes	%	Seats	Gov.
2021	Laura Borràs	570,539	20.1 (#3)	32 / 135	Yes (Note: 2021–2022.)
2021	Laura Borràs	570,539	20.1 (#3)	32 / 135	No (Note: 2022–2024.)
2024	Carles Puigdemont	681,470	21.6 (#2)	35 / 135	No

=== Cortes Generales ===
Cortes Generales
Election	Leading candidate	Congress			Senate			Gov.
Election	Leading candidate	Votes	%	Seats	Votes	%	Seats	Gov.
2023	Míriam Nogueras	395,429	1.6 (#6)	7 / 350	1,251,626	1.8 (#6)	1 / 208	(Note: Confidence and supply (2023–2025).)
2023	Míriam Nogueras	395,429	1.6 (#6)	7 / 350	1,251,626	1.8 (#6)	1 / 208	No (Note: 2025–present.)

=== European Parliament ===
European Parliament
Election	Leading candidate	Votes	%	Seats	EP Group
2024	Toni Comín	442,140	2.5 (#8)	1 / 61 (Note: Antoni Comín ran as a candidate for Junts in the 2024 European Parliament election and secured a seat as an MEP. However, Comín was unable to take office. The Central Electoral Board left the seat vacant because he failed to appear at the Congress of Deputies to swear allegiance to the Spanish Constitution—a requirement under Spanish electoral law for fully assuming the status of MEP. Subsequently, the European Parliament acknowledged the Central Electoral Board's notification and kept the seat vacant. Comín eventually took up his seat on 22 October 2026.)	NI
