= President of the Government of Catalonia =

Head of government

- President de la Generalitat de Catalunya
- Emblem of the Generalitat

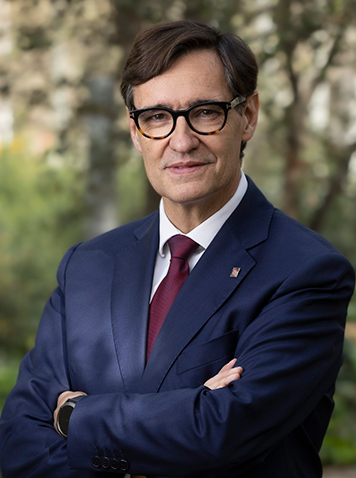
- Incumbent; Salvador Illa since 10 August 2024
- Executive Council of Catalonia; Generalitat de Catalunya
- Style: El Molt Honorable Senyor (The Right Honourable)
- Residence: Casa dels Canonges
- Seat: Barcelona
- Nominator: Parliament of Catalonia
- Appointer: The Monarch; countersigned by the Prime Minister
- Term length: Four years, renewable
- Inaugural holder: Berenguer de Cruïlles (1359)
- Formation: 1359
- Deputy: Vice President
- Salary: €136,177.50 per year
- Website: president.cat

The president of the Government of Catalonia (Catalan: President de la Generalitat de Catalunya, IPA: [pɾəziˈðen də lə ʒənəɾəliˈtad də kətəˈluɲə]) is the head of government of the executive branch of the Generalitat de Catalunya, government of Catalonia.

It is one of the institutions that the Statute of Autonomy of Catalonia stipulates as part of the Generalitat de Catalunya and leads the Executive Council of Catalonia. The president is elected by the Parliament of Catalonia.

The current president is Salvador Illa of the Socialists' Party of Catalonia, who won the 2024 Catalan regional election and was elected by conforming a majority with other progressive parties. Illa's government is the first non-independentist government in Catalonia since 2010.

== Functions of the president ==
The office of president of the Government of Catalonia has both executive and representative functions, as set by law.

=== Governmental functions ===
The president is a member and leader of the Executive Council of Catalonia. At the beginning of the legislature, the president establishes the Catalan ministries and appoints its ministers (officially called consellers in catalan, lit. 'councillors'), which may be dismissed or replaced at any time. The president also calls for meetings of the Executive Council, and signs and orders the publication of the decrees accorded in the meetings.

The president can also call for an extraordinary session of the Parliament of Catalonia which, given the case, can be ordered to be dissolved or hold a general debate. The President is also responsible for calling for elections (which must take place no later than four years after the last election).

Moreover, the president must coordinate the legislative agenda of its government, the elaboration of general normatives and give all the information that Parliament may decide to request.

=== Representative functions ===
The president holds the highest representation of the Generalitat and the ordinary of the State in the autonomous community. He is also in charge of the domestic relations with the other bodies of the State and with the autonomous communities that Catalonia shares interests with. As ordinary representative of the State in Catalonia, he promulgates laws in the autonomous community in name of the King.

== Election of the president ==
After each Catalan regional election, the Parliament of Catalonia constitutes a new legislature and elects the Board of the Parliament of Catalonia. After that, the president of the Parliament of Catalonia conducts a round of talks with the leaders of the different political parties and proposes the candidate that appears to have most support.

In the investiture session, the candidate presents its government program (without time limit) and asks the deputies for their support. The other parties then replicate the candidate and the voting is held. The candidate to presidency has to be voted by absolute majority and, in case it fails, it has a second attempt by simple majority.

If the candidate is not successful, the president of the Parliament must conduct another round of talks and propose again a candidate that appears to have most support (the failed candidate can be proposed again if the parties that rejected the vote change their position). If 2 months after the first voting no candidate has obtained a majority, the legislature is dissolved and a new election must take place.

If the vote is successful, the candidate is designated president of the Government of Catalonia and appointed by the King of Spain under proposition of the Parliament of Catalonia. No later than 5 days after the publication of its designation in the official bulletin, the new president takes possession of the office in a ceremony at the Palace of the Generalitat of Catalonia.

== See also ==
- Politics of Catalonia
- List of political parties in Catalonia
- History of Catalonia
