= Government of Salvador Illa =

- Executive Council of Catalonia
- 2024–present
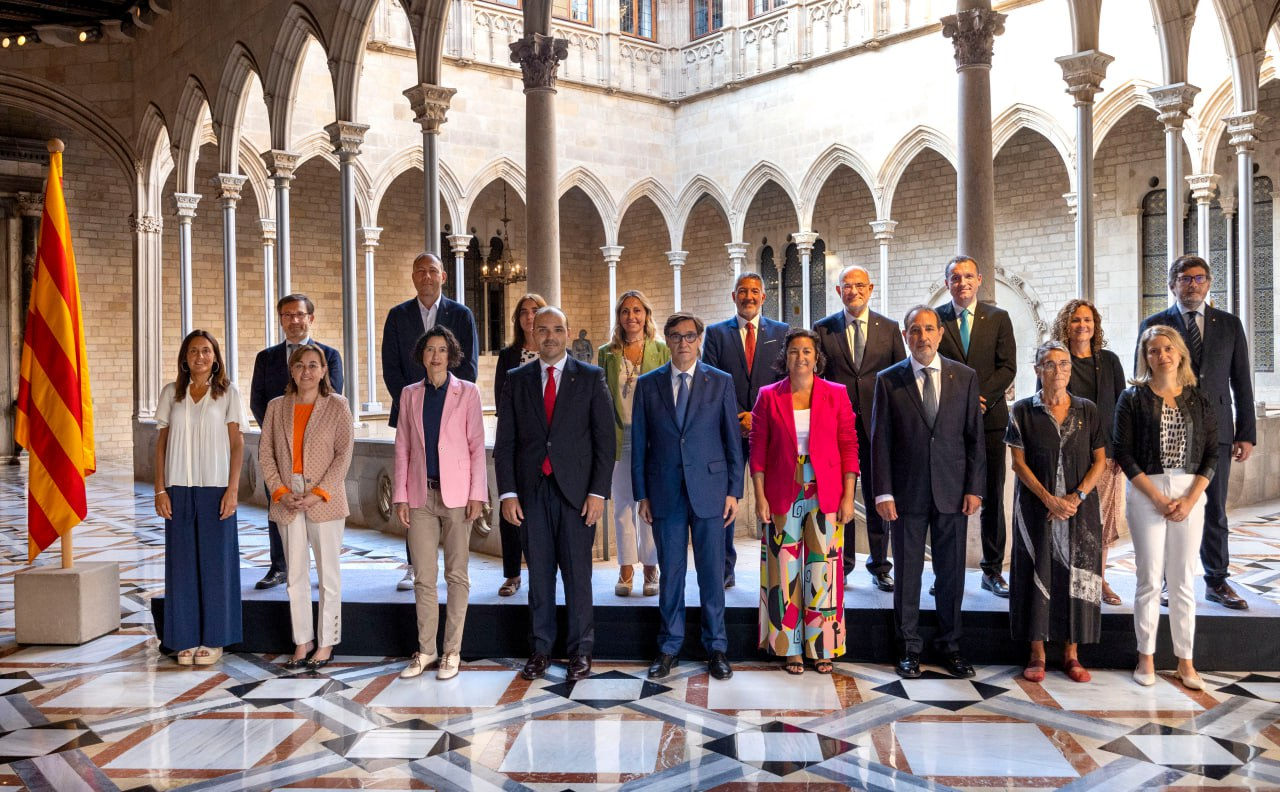
- The government in August 2024.
- Date formed: 12 August 2024

People and organisations
- Monarch: Felipe VI
- President: Salvador Illa
- No. of ministers: 16 (Note: Does not include the President.)
- Total no. of members: 17
- Member parties: PSC (Note: Including Els Units.)
- Status in legislature: Minority (single-party)
- Opposition party: Junts
- Opposition leader: TBD

History
- Election: 2024 regional election
- Legislature term: 15th Parliament
- Budget: 2026
- Predecessor: Aragonès

The government of Salvador Illa was formed on 12 August 2024 following the latter's election as President of the Government of Catalonia by the Parliament of Catalonia on 8 August and his swearing-in on 10 August, as a result of the Socialists' Party of Catalonia (PSC) being able to muster a majority of seats in the Parliament with external support from the Republican Left of Catalonia (ERC) and Commons Unite (Comuns Sumar) following the 2024 Catalan regional election. It succeeded the Aragonès government and has been the incumbent Government of Catalonia since 12 August 2024, a total of 707 days, or 1 year, 11 months and 8 days.

The cabinet comprises members of the PSC (including one member of United to Advance, which had contested the 2024 election in alliance with the PSC) and a number of independents.

== Investiture ==
Investiture; Salvador Illa (PSC)
Ballot →	8 August 2024
Required majority →	68 out of 135
Yes: • PSC (42); • ERC (20); • Comuns Sumar (6)	68 / 135
No: • Junts (34); • PP (15); • Vox (11); • CUP–DT (4); • Aliança.cat (2)	66 / 135
Abstentions	0 / 135
Absentees: • Junts (1)	1 / 135

== Executive Council ==
The Executive Council is structured into the offices for the president and 16 ministries.

← Illa Government → (12 August 2024 – present)
Portfolio	Name	Party	Took office	Left office	Ref.
President	Salvador Illa	PSC	10 August 2024	Incumbent	
Minister of the Presidency	Albert Dalmau	PSC	12 August 2024	Incumbent	
Minister of Economy and Finance	Alícia Romero	PSC	12 August 2024	Incumbent	
Minister of the Interior and Public Security	Núria Parlón	PSC	12 August 2024	Incumbent	
Minister of Justice and Democratic Quality	Ramon Espadaler	PSC^{/Els Units}	12 August 2024	Incumbent	
Minister of Territory, Housing and Ecological Transition	Sílvia Paneque	PSC	12 August 2024	Incumbent	
Minister of Health	Olga Pané	Independent	12 August 2024	Incumbent	
Minister of Education and Vocational Training	Esther Niubó	PSC	12 August 2024	Incumbent	
Minister of Social Rights and Inclusion	Mónica Martínez Bravo	PSC	12 August 2024	21 July 2026	
Minister of Business and Labour	Miquel Sàmper	Independent	12 August 2024	Incumbent	
Minister of Equality and Feminism	Eva Menor	PSC	12 August 2024	Incumbent	
Minister of European Union and Foreign Action	Jaume Duch	Independent	12 August 2024	Incumbent	
Minister of Research and Universities	Núria Montserrat Pulido	Independent	12 August 2024	Incumbent	
Minister of Agriculture, Livestock, Fisheries and Food	Òscar Ordeig	PSC	12 August 2024	Incumbent	
Minister of Sports	Berni Álvarez	PSC	12 August 2024	Incumbent	
Minister of Culture	Sònia Hernández Almodóvar	Independent	12 August 2024	Incumbent	
Minister of Language Policy	Francesc Xavier Vila	Independent	12 August 2024	Incumbent	
=== Changes July 2026 ===
Portfolio	Name	Party	Took office	Left office	Ref.
Minister of Social Rights and Inclusion	Raúl Moreno	PSC	21 July 2026	Incumbent	

== Departmental structure ==
Salvador Illa's government is organised into several superior and governing units, whose number, powers and hierarchical structure may vary depending on the ministerial department.

Unit/body rank

- (■) General secretary
- (■) Director-general

Office (Original name)	Portrait	Name	Took office	Left office	Alliance/party	Ref.
=== Presidency ===
Presidency (Presidència de la Generalitat)		Salvador Illa	10 August 2024	Incumbent	PSC	
=== Department of the Presidency ===
Department of the Presidency (Departament de la Presidència)		Albert Dalmau	12 August 2024	Incumbent	PSC	
=== Department of Economy and Finance ===
Department of Economy and Finance (Departament d'Economia i Finances)		Alícia Romero	12 August 2024	Incumbent	PSC	
=== Department of the Interior and Public Security ===
Department of the Interior and Public Security (Departament d'Interior i Seguretat Pública)		Núria Parlón	12 August 2024	Incumbent	PSC	
=== Department of Justice and Democratic Quality ===
Department of Justice and Democratic Quality (Departament de Justícia i Qualitat Democràtica)		Ramon Espadaler	12 August 2024	Incumbent	PSC (Els Units)	
=== Department of Territory, Housing and Ecological Transition ===
Department of Territory, Housing and Ecological Transition (Departament de Territori, Habitatge i Transició Ecològica)		Sílvia Paneque	12 August 2024	Incumbent	PSC	
=== Department of Health ===
Department of Health (Departament de Salut)		Olga Pané	12 August 2024	Incumbent	PSC (Independent)	
=== Department of Education and Vocational Training ===
Department of Education and Vocational Training (Departament d'Educació i Formació Professional)		Esther Niubó	12 August 2024	Incumbent	PSC	
=== Department of Social Rights and Inclusion ===
Department of Social Rights and Inclusion (Departament de Drets Socials i Inclusió)		Mónica Martínez Bravo	12 August 2024	21 July 2026	PSC	
Department of Social Rights and Inclusion (Departament de Drets Socials i Inclusió)		Raúl Moreno	21 July 2026	Incumbent	PSC	
=== Department of Business and Labour ===
Department of Business and Labour (Departament d'Empresa i Treball)		Miquel Sàmper	12 August 2024	Incumbent	PSC (Independent)	
=== Department of Equality and Feminism ===
Department of Equality and Feminism (Departament d'Igualtat i Feminisme)		Eva Menor	12 August 2024	Incumbent	PSC	
=== Department of European Union and Foreign Action ===
Department of European Union and Foreign Action (Departament d'Unió Europea i Acció Exterior)		Jaume Duch	12 August 2024	Incumbent	PSC (Independent)	
=== Department of Research and Universities ===
Department of Research and Universities (Departament de Recerca i Universitats)		Núria Montserrat Pulido	12 August 2024	Incumbent	PSC (Independent)	
=== Department of Agriculture, Livestock, Fisheries and Food ===
Department of Agriculture, Livestock, Fisheries and Food (Departament d'Agricultura, Ramaderia, Pesca i Alimentació)		Òscar Ordeig	12 August 2024	Incumbent	PSC	
=== Department of Sports ===
Department of Sports (Departament d'Esports)		Berni Álvarez	12 August 2024	Incumbent	PSC	
=== Department of Culture ===
Department of Culture (Departament de Cultura)		Sònia Hernández Almodóvar	12 August 2024	Incumbent	PSC (Independent)	
=== Department of Language Policy ===
Department of Language Policy (Departament de Política Lingüística)		Francesc Xavier Vila	12 August 2024	Incumbent	PSC (Independent)	

== Notes ==
Preceded by Aragonès	Government of Catalonia; 2024–present	Incumbent
