= Fifth government of Jordi Pujol =

Pujol V Government
- Executive Council of Catalonia
- 1996–1999
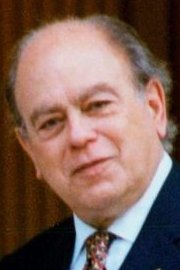
- Jordi Pujol
- Date formed: 12 January 1996
- Date dissolved: 29 November 1999

People and organisations
- Head of government: Jordi Pujol
- Member party: CiU
- Status in legislature: Minority government
- Opposition party: PSC
- Opposition leader: Joaquim Nadal

History
- Election: 1995 regional election
- Outgoing election: 1999 regional election
- Legislature term: V Legislature (1995–1999)
- Budget: 1996, 1997, 1998, 1999
- Predecessor: Pujol IV
- Successor: Pujol VI

The fifth government of Jordi Pujol was formed on 12 January 1996 following the latter's reelection as President of Catalonia by the Parliament of Catalonia on 16 December 1995 and his swearing-in on ?, as a result of the Convergence and Union (CiU) alliance emerging as the largest parliamentary force at the 1995 Catalan regional election, though managing to lose the absolute majority for the first time since 1980. It succeeded the fourth Pujol government and was the Government of Catalonia from 12 January 1996 to 29 November 1999, a total of 1,366 days, or 3 years, 10 months and 17 days

The cabinet was an all-CiU government, comprising members of the Democratic Convergence of Catalonia (CDC) and its sister party, the Democratic Union of Catalonia (UDC). It was automatically dismissed on 18 October 1999 as a consequence of the 1999 regional election, but remained in acting capacity until the next government was sworn in.

== Investiture ==
Investiture; Jordi Pujol (CiU (CDC))
Ballot →	14 December 1995	16 December 1995
Required majority →	68 out of 135	Simple
Yes: • CiU (60)	60 / 135	60 / 135
No: • ERC (13) (on 14 Dec); • IC (11)	24 / 135	11 / 135
Abstentions: • PSC (33) (31 on 14 Dec); • PP (17); • ERC (13) (on 16 Dec)	48 / 135	63 / 135
Absentees: • PSC (1) (3 on 14 Dec)	3 / 135	1 / 135

== Executive Council ==
The Executive Council was structured into the office for the president and 14/13 ministries.

← Pujol V Government → (11 January 1996 – 29 November 1999)
Portfolio	Name	Party	Took office	Left office	Ref.
President	Jordi Pujol	CiU (CDC)	21 December 1995	24 November 1999	
Minister of Presidency	Xavier Trias	CiU (CDC)	12 January 1996	29 November 1999	
Minister of Governance	Xavier Pomés	CiU (CDC)	12 January 1996	29 November 1999	
Minister of Economy and Finance	Macià Alavedra	CiU (CDC)	12 January 1996	30 July 1997	
Minister of Education	Joan Maria Pujals i Vallvé	CiU (CDC)	12 January 1996	7 June 1996	
Minister of Culture	Joan Guitart	CiU (CDC)	12 January 1996	7 June 1996	
Minister of Health and Social Security	Eduard Rius	CiU (CDC)	12 January 1996	29 November 1999	
Minister of Territorial Policy and Public Works	Artur Mas	CiU (CDC)	12 January 1996	29 November 1999	
Minister of Agriculture, Livestock and Fisheries	Francesc Xavier Marimon	CiU (CDC)	12 January 1996	29 November 1999	
Minister of Labour	Ignasi Farreres	CiU (UDC)	12 January 1996	29 November 1999	
Minister of Justice	Núria de Gispert	CiU (UDC)	12 January 1996	29 November 1999	
Minister of Industry and Energy	Antoni Subirà	CiU (CDC)	12 January 1996	7 June 1996	
Minister of Trade, Consumer Affairs and Tourism	Lluís Alegre	CiU (UDC)	12 January 1996	7 June 1996	
Minister of Social Welfare	Antoni Comas	CiU (CDC)	12 January 1996	29 November 1999	
Minister of the Environment	Albert Vilalta	CiU (CDC)	12 January 1996	7 June 1996	
=== Changes June 1996 ===
Portfolio	Name	Party	Took office	Left office	Ref.
Minister of Education	Xavier Hernández Moreno	CiU (CDC)	7 June 1996	29 November 1999	
Minister of Culture	Joan Maria Pujals i Vallvé	CiU (CDC)	7 June 1996	29 November 1999	
~~Minister of Industry and Energy~~ (Note: On 7 June 1996, the ministries of Industry and Energy and Trade, Consumer Affairs and Tourism were merged into the newly created ministry of Industry, Trade and Tourism.)	Disestablished on 7 June 1996.				
~~Minister of Trade, Consumer Affairs and Tourism~~	Disestablished on 7 June 1996.				
Minister of Industry, Trade and Tourism	Antoni Subirà	CiU (CDC)	7 June 1996	29 November 1999	
Minister of the Environment	Pere Macias	CiU (CDC)	7 June 1996	30 July 1997	
=== Changes July 1997 ===
Portfolio	Name	Party	Took office	Left office	Ref.
Minister of Economy and Finance	Artur Mas	CiU (CDC)	30 July 1997	29 November 1999	
Minister of Territorial Policy and Public Works	Pere Macias	CiU (CDC)	30 July 1997	29 November 1999	
Minister of the Environment	Joan Ignasi Puigdollers	CiU (UDC)	30 July 1997	29 November 1999	

== Notes ==
Preceded by Pujol IV	Government of Catalonia; 1996–1999	Succeeded by Pujol VI
