= Executive Council of Catalonia =

Government body in Spain

Government of Catalonia
- Govern de Catalunya
- Seal of the Generalitat de Catalunya

Government overview
- Formed: 1931 (by the Second Spanish Republic); 1977 (from exile)
- Dissolved: 1939 (by Francoist Spain)
- Jurisdiction: Catalonia
- Headquarters: Sala Tarradellas, Palau de la Generalitat de Catalunya, Barcelona
- Government executive: Salvador Illa, President of the Government of Catalonia
- Website: catalangovernment.eu

The Executive Council of Catalonia (Catalan: Consell Executiu) or the Executive Government of Catalonia (Catalan: Govern de Catalunya) is the executive branch of the Generalitat of Catalonia and its main collective decision-making body. It is responsible for the political action, regulation, and administration of the government of the autonomous region.

The President of the Generalitat is the head of government. The president may also appoint a First Minister (Catalan: Conseller(a) primer(a)) to serve as their deputy, although since 2006 the office has been replaced by that of the Vice-President of the Generalitat of Catalonia, who must be approved by the Parliament of Catalonia. The various ministers (Catalan: consellers) are also appointed by the President of the Generalitat. Ministers, who chair their respective departments, need not be deputies in the parliament, as they have an automatic right to intervene in parliamentary debates.

The Executive Council is made up by the President, the First Minister or Vice president, and the Ministers. Sessions of the council are called by the President, who chairs it, or, if absent, by the First Minister or Vice president. The mandatory quorum is half the Ministers and the chair. Decisions and resolutions are adopted by simple majority, and in case of tie, the vote cast by the President is tie-breaking. All decisions must be recorded in minutes drawn up by the Secretary of the Government. Members are required to keep secret the deliberations taken and members' individual opinions and votes. Members may not release documents known by the Council until their official publication.

Serving members of the government may not be arrested for any acts committed in Catalonia, except in flagrante delicto, and may only be judged before the High Court of Justice of Catalonia, or the Criminal Chamber of the Supreme Court of Spain outside of Catalonia.

The Parliament of Catalonia unilaterally issued a declaration of independence from Spain on 27 October 2017 in favour of a Catalan Republic. In response Spanish Prime Minister Mariano Rajoy dissolved the Parliament of Catalonia and called a snap regional election for 21 December 2017.

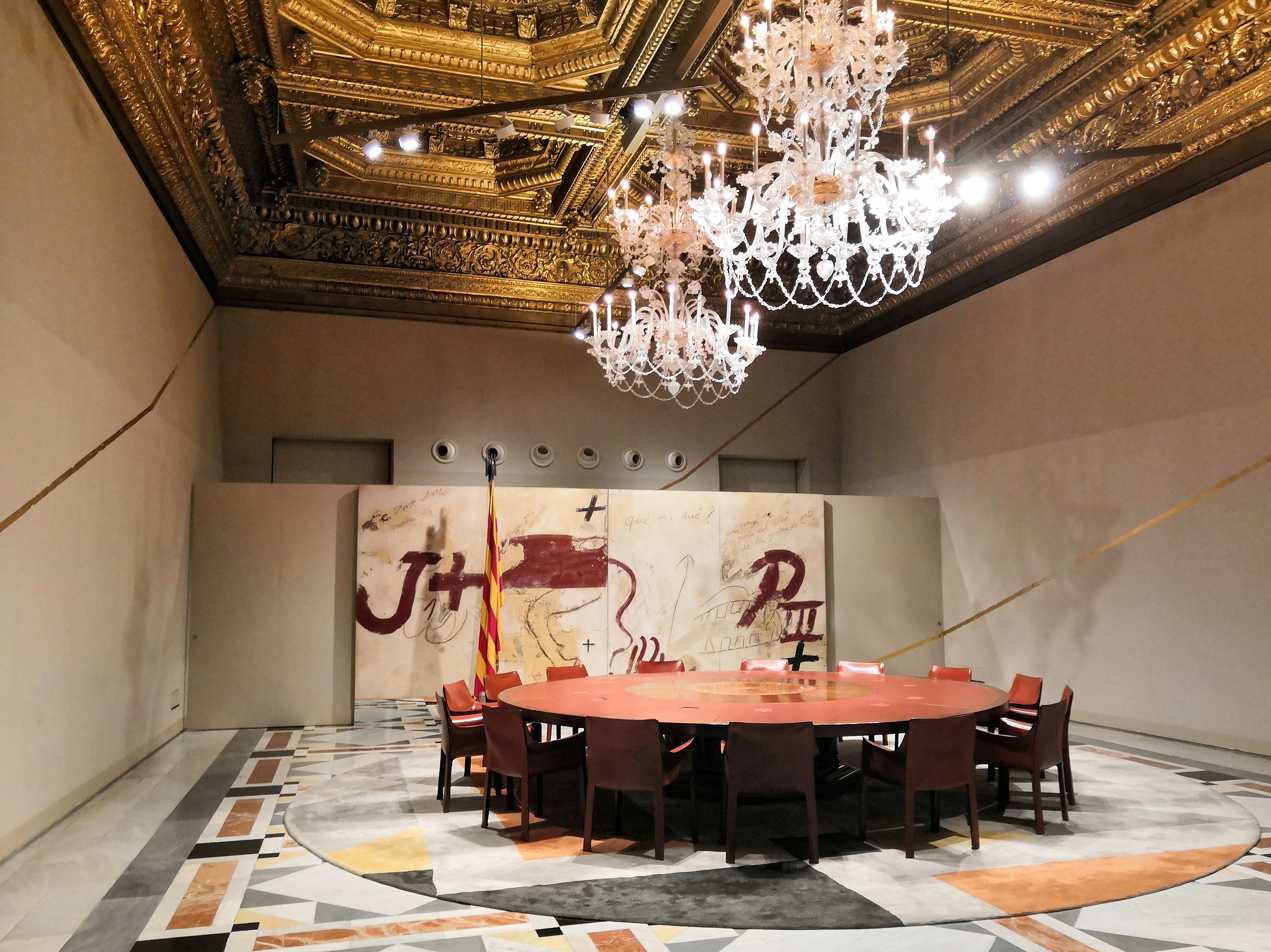
Sala Tarradellas, the meeting place of the Government of Catalonia

== Current government ==
← Illa Government → (12 August 2024 – present)
Portfolio	Name	Party	Took office	Left office	Ref.
President	Salvador Illa	PSC	10 August 2024	Incumbent	
Minister of the Presidency	Albert Dalmau	PSC	12 August 2024	Incumbent	
Minister of Economy and Finance	Alícia Romero	PSC	12 August 2024	Incumbent	
Minister of the Interior and Public Security	Núria Parlón	PSC	12 August 2024	Incumbent	
Minister of Justice and Democratic Quality	Ramon Espadaler	PSC (Els Units)	12 August 2024	Incumbent	
Minister of Territory, Housing and Ecological Transition	Sílvia Paneque	PSC	12 August 2024	Incumbent	
Minister of Health	Olga Pané	PSC (Ind.)	12 August 2024	Incumbent	
Minister of Education and Vocational Training	Esther Niubó	PSC	12 August 2024	Incumbent	
Minister of Social Rights and Inclusion	Mónica Martínez Bravo	PSC	12 August 2024	Incumbent	
Minister of Business and Labour	Miquel Sàmper	PSC (Ind.)	12 August 2024	Incumbent	
Minister of Equality and Feminism	Eva Menor	PSC	12 August 2024	Incumbent	
Minister of European Union and Foreign Action	Jaume Duch	PSC (Ind.)	12 August 2024	Incumbent	
Minister of Research and Universities	Núria Montserrat Pulido	PSC (Ind.)	12 August 2024	Incumbent	
Minister of Agriculture, Livestock, Fisheries and Food	Òscar Ordeig	PSC	12 August 2024	Incumbent	
Minister of Sports	Berni Álvarez	PSC	12 August 2024	Incumbent	
Minister of Culture	Sònia Hernández Almodóvar	PSC (Ind.)	12 August 2024	Incumbent	
Minister of Language Policy	Francesc Xavier Vila	PSC (Ind.)	12 August 2024	Incumbent	

== List of governments since 1977 ==
- Provisional government, 1977–1980
- First government of Jordi Pujol, 1980–1984
- Second government of Jordi Pujol, 1984–1988
- Third government of Jordi Pujol, 1988–1992
- Fourth government of Jordi Pujol, 1992–1996
- Fifth government of Jordi Pujol, 1996–1999
- Sixth government of Jordi Pujol, 1999–2003
- Government of Pasqual Maragall, 2003–2006
- Government of José Montilla, 2006–2010
- First government of Artur Mas, 2010–2012
- Second government of Artur Mas, 2012–2016
- Government of Carles Puigdemont, 2016–2017
- Government of Quim Torra, 2018–2020
- Government of Pere Aragonès, 2021–2024
- Government of Salvador Illa, 2024–
