= Fourth government of Jordi Pujol =

Catalan regional government

4th government of Jordi Pujol
- Executive Council of Catalonia
- 1992–1996
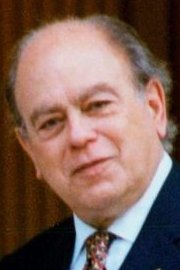
- Date formed: 16 April 1992
- Date dissolved: 11 January 1996

People and organisations
- Monarch: Juan Carlos I
- President: Jordi Pujol
- No. of ministers: 13 (Note: Does not include the President.)
- Total no. of members: 22
- Member party: Democratic Convergence of Catalonia; Democratic Union of Catalonia
- Status in legislature: Majority coalition government
- Opposition party: PSC–PSOE
- Opposition leader: Raimon Obiols

History
- Election: 1992 regional election
- Outgoing election: 1995 regional election
- Legislature term: 4th Parliament
- Budget: 1993, 1994, 1995
- Predecessor: Pujol III
- Successor: Pujol V

The fourth government of Jordi Pujol was formed on 16 April 1992 following the latter's reelection as President of Catalonia by the Parliament of Catalonia on 9 April and his swearing-in on 15 April, as a result of the Convergence and Union (CiU) alliance emerging as the largest parliamentary force at the 1992 Catalan regional election and securing a third consecutive absolute majority. It succeeded the third Pujol government and was the Government of Catalonia from 16 April 1992 to 11 January 1996, a total of 1,365 days, or 3 years, 8 months and 26 days.

The cabinet was an all-CiU government, comprising members of the Democratic Convergence of Catalonia (CDC) and its sister party, the Democratic Union of Catalonia (UDC). It was automatically dismissed on 20 November 1995 as a consequence of the 1995 regional election, but remained in acting capacity until the next government was sworn in.

== Investiture ==
Investiture; Jordi Pujol (CDC)
Ballot →	9 April 1992
Required majority →	68 out of 135
Yes: • CiU (70)	70 / 135
No: • PSC (40); • ERC (11); • IC (7)	58 / 135
Abstentions: • PP (7)	7 / 135
Absentees	0 / 135

== Executive Council ==
The Executive Council was structured into the office for the president and 13 ministries.

← Pujol IV Government → (16 April 1992 – 11 January 1996)
Portfolio	Name	Party	Took office	Left office	Ref.
President	Jordi Pujol	CDC	15 April 1992	21 December 1995	
Minister of Governance	Josep Gomis	CDC	16 April 1992	22 December 1992	
Minister of Economy and Finance	Macià Alavedra	CDC	16 April 1992	11 January 1996	
Minister of Education	Josep Laporte	CDC	16 April 1992	22 December 1992	
Minister of Culture	Joan Guitart	CDC	16 April 1992	11 January 1996	
Minister of Health and Social Security	Xavier Trias	CDC	16 April 1992	11 January 1996	
Minister of Territorial Policy and Public Works	Joaquim Molins	CDC	16 April 1992	29 April 1993	
Minister of Agriculture, Livestock and Fisheries	Joan Vallvé	CDC	16 April 1992	14 September 1992	
Minister of Labour	Ignasi Farreres	UDC	16 April 1992	11 January 1996	
Minister of Justice	Agustí Bassols	UDC	16 April 1992	22 December 1992	
Minister of Industry and Energy	Antoni Subirà	CDC	16 April 1992	11 January 1996	
Minister of Trade, Consumer Affairs and Tourism	Lluís Alegre	UDC	16 April 1992	11 January 1996	
Minister of Social Welfare	Antoni Comas	CDC	16 April 1992	11 January 1996	
Minister of the Environment	Albert Vilalta	CDC	16 April 1992	11 January 1996	
=== Changes September 1992 ===
Portfolio	Name	Party	Took office	Left office	Ref.
Minister of Agriculture, Livestock and Fisheries	Francesc Xavier Marimón	CDC	14 September 1992	11 January 1996	
=== Changes December 1992 ===
Portfolio	Name	Party	Took office	Left office	Ref.
Minister of Governance	Maria Eugènia Cuenca	CDC	22 December 1992	1 February 1995	
Minister of Education	Joan Maria Pujals	CDC	22 December 1992	11 January 1996	
Minister of Justice	Antoni Isac	UDC	22 December 1992	1 February 1995	
=== Changes May 1993 ===
Portfolio	Name	Party	Took office	Left office	Ref.
Minister of Territorial Policy and Public Works	Josep Maria Cullell	CDC	6 May 1993	18 November 1994	
=== Changes November 1994 ===
Portfolio	Name	Party	Took office	Left office	Ref.
Minister of Territorial Policy and Public Works	Jaume Roma	CDC	18 November 1994	15 June 1995	
=== Changes February 1995 ===
Portfolio	Name	Party	Took office	Left office	Ref.
Minister of Governance	Xavier Pomés	CDC	1 February 1995	11 January 1996	
Minister of Justice	Núria de Gispert	UDC	1 February 1995	11 January 1996	
=== Changes June 1995 ===
Portfolio	Name	Party	Took office	Left office	Ref.
Minister of Territorial Policy and Public Works	Artur Mas	CDC	16 June 1995	11 January 1996	

== Notes ==
Preceded by Pujol III	Government of Catalonia; 1992–1996	Succeeded by Pujol V
