= Alavedra =

Alavedra might refer to:

- Baldiri Alavedra (1944–2020), Spanish footballer
- Macià Alavedra, Spanish politician
