= List of ministers of the interior of Catalonia =

Minister of the Interior of Catalonia
- Conseller d'Interior de Catalunya
- Seal of the Generalitat of Catalonia

- Flag of Catalonia

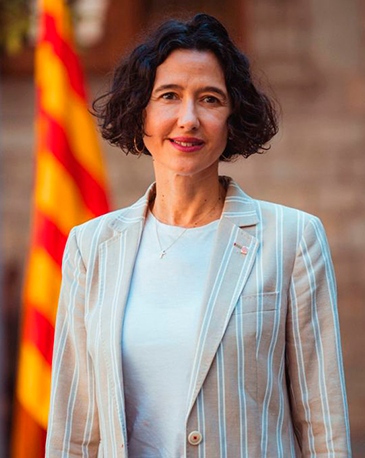
- Incumbent; Núria Parlón since 12 August 2024
- Department of Interior
- Member of: Executive Council of Catalonia
- Reports to: President of Catalonia
- Seat: Barcelona
- Appointer: President of Catalonia
- Precursor: Minister of Governance
- Inaugural holder: Josep Antoni Duran i Lleida
- Formation: 29 November 1999
- Website: Department of Interior, Catalonia

This article lists the ministers of the interior of Catalonia.

== List ==
Ministers of the Interior
Name	Portrait	Party	Took office	Left office	President	Ministerial title	Refs
Xavier Pomés i Abella		Democratic Convergence of Catalonia	29 November 1999	4 November 2002	Jordi Pujol	Minister of the Interior	
Núria de Gispert		Democratic Union of Catalonia	4 November 2002	17 December 2003	Jordi Pujol	Minister of Justice and the Interior	
Montserrat Tura		Socialists' Party of Catalonia	17 December 2003	29 November 2006	Pasqual Maragall	Minister of the Interior	
Joan Saura		Initiative for Catalonia Greens	29 November 2006	29 December 2010	José Montilla	Minister of the Interior, Institutional Relations and Participation	
Felip Puig		Democratic Convergence of Catalonia	29 December 2010	27 December 2012	Artur Mas	Minister of the Interior	
Ramon Espadaler Parcerisas		Democratic Union of Catalonia	27 December 2012	22 June 2015	Artur Mas	Minister of the Interior	
Jordi Jané i Guasch		Democratic Convergence of Catalonia	22 June 2015	14 July 2017	Artur Mas	Minister of the Interior	
Jordi Jané i Guasch		Democratic Convergence of Catalonia	22 June 2015	14 July 2017	Carles Puigdemont	Minister of the Interior	
Joaquim Forn		Catalan European Democratic Party	14 July 2017	28 October 2017	Carles Puigdemont	Minister of the Interior	
Miquel Buch		Catalan European Democratic Party	2 June 2018	3 September 2020	Quim Torra	Minister of the Interior	
Miquel Sàmper		Together for Catalonia	3 September 2020	26 May 2021	Quim Torra	Minister of the Interior	
Joan Ignasi Elena		Independent (nominated by Republican Left of Catalonia)	26 May 2021	12 August 2024	Pere Aragonès	Minister of the Interior	
Núria Parlón		Socialists' Party of Catalonia	12 August 2024	Incumbent	Salvador Illa	Minister of the Interior	
