= Sixth government of Jordi Pujol =

Pujol VI Government
- Executive Council of Catalonia
- 1999–2003
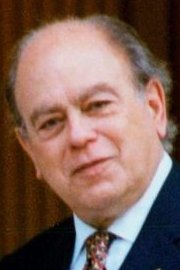
- Jordi Pujol
- Date formed: 30 November 1999
- Date dissolved: 22 December 2003

People and organisations
- Head of government: Jordi Pujol
- Deputy head of government: Artur Mas
- Member party: CiU
- Status in legislature: Minority government
- Opposition party: PSC
- Opposition leader: Pasqual Maragall

History
- Election: 1999 regional election
- Outgoing election: 2003 regional election
- Legislature term: VI Legislature (1999–2003)
- Budget: 2000, 2001, 2002, 2003
- Predecessor: Pujol V
- Successor: Maragall

The sixth government of Jordi Pujol was formed on 30 November 1999 following the latter's reelection as President of Catalonia by the Parliament of Catalonia on 16 November 1999 and his swearing-in on 29 November 1999, as a result of the Socialists' Party of Catalonia (PSC) and the opposition falling one seat short of a parliamentary majority at the 1995 Catalan regional election, thus allowing Convergence and Union (CiU) to continue to rule with the external support of the People's Party (PP). It succeeded the fifth Pujol government and was the Government of Catalonia from 30 November 1999 to 22 December 2003, a total of 1,483 days, or 4 years and 22 days

The cabinet was an all-CiU government, comprising members of the Democratic Convergence of Catalonia (CDC) and its sister party, the Democratic Union of Catalonia (UDC). It was automatically dismissed on 17 November 2003 as a consequence of the 2003 regional election, but remained in acting capacity until the next government was sworn in.

== Investiture ==
Investiture; Jordi Pujol (CiU (CDC))
Ballot →	16 November 1999
Required majority →	68 out of 135
Yes: • CiU (56); • PP (12)	68 / 135
No: • PSC–CpC (50); • IC–V (5)	55 / 135
Abstentions: • ERC (12)	12 / 135
Absentees	0 / 135

== Executive Council ==
The Executive Council was structured into the office for the president and 14/13 ministries.

← Pujol VI Government → (30 November 1999 – 22 December 2003)
Portfolio	Name	Party	Took office	Left office	Ref.
President	Jordi Pujol	CiU (CDC)	24 November 1999	18 December 2003	
Minister of Presidency	Xavier Trias	CiU (CDC)	30 November 1999	7 February 2000	
Minister of Governance and Institutional Relations	Josep Antoni Duran i Lleida	CiU (UDC)	30 November 1999	6 February 2001	
Minister of Economy, Finance and Planification	Artur Mas	CiU (CDC)	30 November 1999	18 January 2001	
Minister of Education	Carme Laura Gil	CiU (CDC)	30 November 1999	22 December 2003	
Minister of Culture	Jordi Vilajoana i Rovira	CiU (CDC)	30 November 1999	22 December 2003	
Minister of Health and Social Security	Eduard Rius	CiU (CDC)	30 November 1999	5 November 2002	
Minister of Territorial Policy and Public Works	Pere Macias	CiU (CDC)	30 November 1999	21 November 2001	
Minister of Agriculture, Livestock and Fisheries	Josep Grau i Seris	CiU (CDC)	30 November 1999	22 December 2003	
Minister of Labour	Lluís Franco i Sala	CiU (UDC)	30 November 1999	5 November 2002	
Minister of Justice	Núria de Gispert	CiU (UDC)	30 November 1999	6 February 2001	
Minister of Industry, Trade and Tourism	Antoni Subirà i Claus	CiU (CDC)	30 November 1999	5 November 2002	
Minister of Social Welfare	Irene Rigau	CiU (CDC)	30 November 1999	5 November 2002	
Minister of the Environment	Felip Puig	CiU (CDC)	30 November 1999	21 November 2001	
Minister of the Interior	Xavier Pomés i Abella	CiU (CDC)	30 November 1999	5 November 2002	
=== Changes February 2000 ===
Portfolio	Name	Party	Took office	Left office	Ref.
Minister of Presidency	Joaquim Triadú i Vila-Abadal	CiU (CDC)	7 February 2000	18 January 2001	
=== Changes April 2000 ===
Portfolio	Name	Party	Took office	Left office	Ref.
Minister of Universities, Research and Information Society	Andreu Mas-Colell	CiU (CDC)	3 April 2000	22 December 2003	
=== Changes January 2001 ===
Portfolio	Name	Party	Took office	Left office	Ref.
First Minister; Minister of Presidency	Artur Mas	CiU (CDC)	18 January 2001	22 December 2003	
Minister of Economy, Finance and Planification	Francesc Homs i Ferret	CiU (CDC)	18 January 2001	22 December 2003	
=== Changes February 2001 ===
Portfolio	Name	Party	Took office	Left office	Ref.
Minister of Governance and Institutional Relations	Núria de Gispert	CiU (UDC)	6 February 2001	5 November 2002	
Minister of Justice	Josep-Delfí Guàrdia i Canela	CiU (UDC)	6 February 2001	5 November 2002	
=== Changes November 2001 ===
Portfolio	Name	Party	Took office	Left office	Ref.
Minister of Territorial Policy and Public Works	Felip Puig	CiU (CDC)	21 November 2001	22 December 2003	
Minister of the Environment	Ramon Espadaler	CiU (UDC)	21 November 2001	22 December 2003	
=== Changes November 2002 ===
Portfolio	Name	Party	Took office	Left office	Ref.
Minister of Justice and the Interior	Núria de Gispert	CiU (UDC)	5 November 2002	22 December 2003	
Minister of Governance and Institutional Relations	Josep Maria Pelegrí i Aixut	CiU (UDC)	5 November 2002	22 December 2003	
Minister of Health and Social Security	Xavier Pomés i Abella	CiU (CDC)	5 November 2002	22 December 2003	
~~Minister of Labour~~ (Note: On 5 November 2002, the ministries of Labour and Industry, Trade and Tourism were merged into the newly created ministry of Labour, Industry, Trade and Tourism.)	Disestablished on 5 November 2002.				
~~Minister of Industry, Trade and Tourism~~	Disestablished on 5 November 2002.				
Minister of Labour, Industry, Trade and Tourism	Antoni Fernández i Teixidó	CiU (CDC)	5 November 2002	22 December 2003	
Minister of Welfare and Family	Irene Rigau	CiU (CDC)	5 November 2002	22 December 2003	

== Notes ==
Preceded by Pujol V	Government of Catalonia; 1999–2003	Succeeded by Maragall
