= Catalan Labour, Economic and Social Affairs Council =

Catalonian governmental advisory body

- Consell de Treball, Econòmic i Social de Catalunya
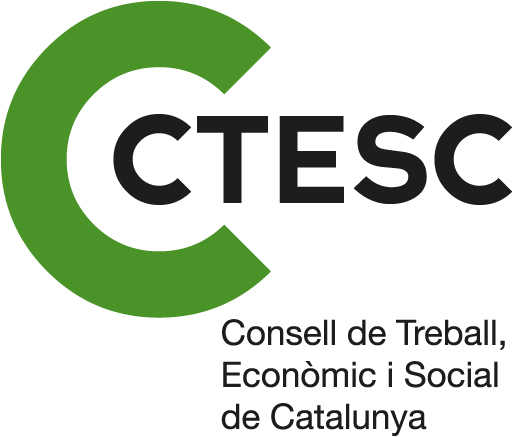
- Catalan Labour, Economic and Social Affairs Council logo

Advisory body overview
- Formed: February 19, 2002; 24 years ago
- Jurisdiction: Government of Catalonia
- Headquarters: Diputació Street, 284, Barcelona
- Advisory body executive: Lluís Franco i Sala, President

The Catalan Labour, Economic and Social Affairs Council (CTESC) is a consultative and advisory body to the Government of Catalonia in socioeconomic, labour and occupational matters. It was created under Law 3/1997, of May 16, and Law 7/2005, of June 8, developed by Decree 43/2007 of February 20 and by the Internal Regulation, which established its new regulatory framework.

== Functions ==
The main function of the council is to issue mandatory, non-binding opinions, prior to the corresponding procedure, on the draft bills and draft legislative decrees that regulate socio-economic, labour and employment matters. The council also prepares annual reports reflecting its considerations regarding the socioeconomic and labour situation in Catalonia and the situation of self-employed workers in Catalonia.

== Composition ==
Article 3 of Law 7/2005, of June 8, of the Catalan Labour, Economic and Social Affairs Council and article 4 of Decree 43/2007, of February 20, on the development of the Law, provide that the council is composed of thirty-seven members, distributed as follows:

- The person who holds the Presidency.
- The First Group, made up by twelve members, representing the most significant trade union organizations (CCOO and UGT).
- The Second Group, made up by twelve members, representing the most significant employers’ organizations (Foment, Pimec and Fepime).
- The Third Group, made up by twelve members: six representing the agrarian sector, the maritime-fishing sector and the social economy sector, currently represented by the following organizations: Catalonian Farmers Union (Unió de Pagesos de Catalunya, UP), Young Farmers and Cattle Ranchers of Catalonia ( Joves Agricultors i Ramaders de Catalunya, JARC), Catalan National Federation of Fishermen's Associations (FNCP), Confederation of Cooperatives of Catalonia (CCC), Board of Entities of the Third Social Sector of Catalonia, and six others, which have to be respected experts in the subjects belonging to the competence field of the council.

== Organs ==
The bodies of the Catalan Labour, Economic and Social Council, in accordance with the provisions of article 6 of Law 7/2005 and article 5 of Decree 43 / 2007, are the following ones:

- The Plenary
- The Executive Commission
- The work commissions
- The Presidency
- The vice presidencies
- The Executive Secretar

== Latest publications ==
- Opinions
- Socio-economic and labour memory of Catalonia
- Situation of autonomous work in Catalonia
- Management report
- Families support policies
- Integration of social and health care
