= Mònica Martínez Bravo =

Spanish politician (born 1982)

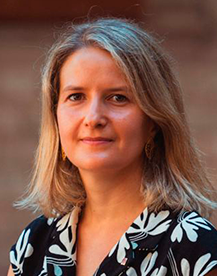
- Martínez Bravo in 2024

Minister of Social Rights and Inclusion
- In office 12 August 2024 – 21 July 2026
- President: Salvador Illa
- Preceded by: Carles Campuzano
- Succeeded by: Raúl Moreno

Personal details
- Born: 1982 (age 43–44)
- Party: Socialists' Party of Catalonia

Mònica Martínez Bravo (born 1982) is a Spanish politician serving as minister of social rights and inclusion of Catalonia since 2024. From January to August 2024, she served as secretary general of inclusion of the Ministry of Inclusion, Social Security and Migration.
