= Sílvia Paneque =

Creating Sílvia Paneque
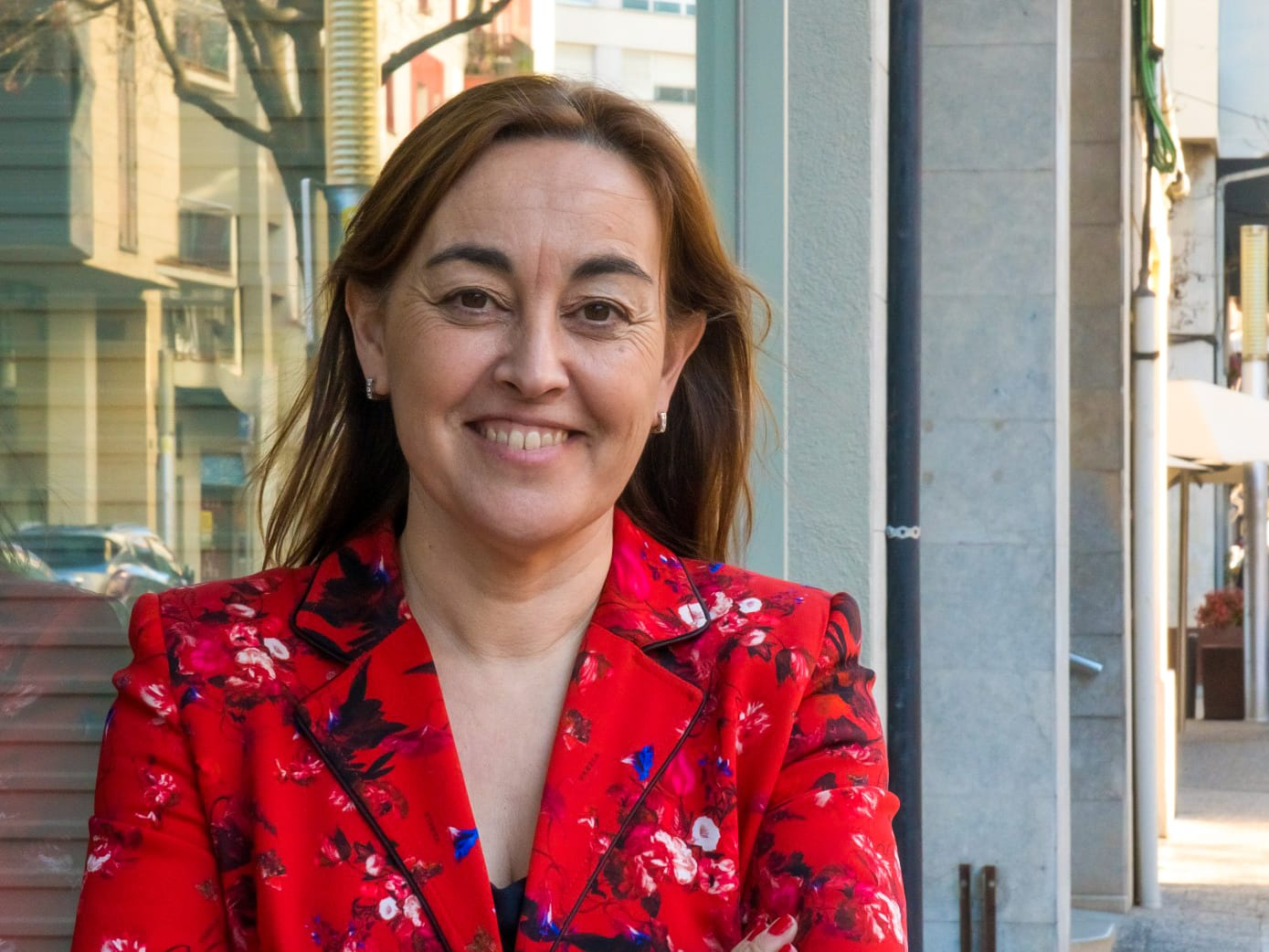

Government Spokesperson Catalonia
- Incumbent
- Assumed office 12 August 2024
- President: Salvador Illa
- Preceded by: Patricia Plaja Perez

Minister of Territory, Housing and Ecological Transition
- Incumbent
- Assumed office 12 August 2024
- Preceded by: Ester Capella

Member of the Parliament of Catalonia
- Incumbent
- Assumed office 12 March 2021
- Constituency: Girona

Personal details
- Born: 12 December 1972 (age 53) Girona, Catalonia
- Party: Socialists' Party of Catalonia
- Education: University of Girona
- Occupation: Politician

Sílvia Paneque i Sureda (born 22 December 1972 in Girona) is a politician from Girona, a member of the Socialist Party of Catalonia. She has been a councillor of Girona City Council from 2011 to August 2024 and a member of the Parliament of Catalonia since 2021. On 12 August 2024, she took office as Minister of Territory, Ecological Transition and Housing of the Generalitat de Catalunya and spokesperson for the government. translated from the corresponding article on Catalan Wikipedia

== Biography ==
With a background in chemistry, she is a founding partner of the Vinico cork factory, and has been an external advisor to companies in the tourism sector. She has also worked as an associate professor and researcher at the University of Girona.

Graduated in chemical sciences from the UdG (1995), she has a master's degree in integrated management of quality, the environment and occupational risks from the Catalan Institute of Technology (1998) and another in technical business management from the University of Girona (2001).

In 2011, she was elected as a councilor in Girona City Council. On 31 March 2012, she was appointed First Secretary of the PSC Group of Girona, and on 4 July 2014, she was elected in primary elections as a candidate for mayor of Girona, with the support of 98.7% of the votes cast. On 28 November 2014, she became spokesperson for the PSC municipal group following an episode in which six of the seven councilors of the socialist group chose to leave the party and remain in the plenary as non-attached councilors.

In the 2015 municipal elections, the socialist list obtained 14.50% of the votes, for which it obtained four councilors. The PSC appointed it as its representative to the Federal Council of the PSOE, from which it resigned in October 2016.On 22 January 2016, Albert Ballesta was inaugurated as mayor of Girona, replacing Carles Puigdemont, the new president of the Generalitat. Ballesta held the position until 8 March, when he was succeeded by Marta Madrenas, inaugurated thanks to an agreement with the socialist municipal group, by which she would assume the responsibilities of Culture, Security, Social Rights, Youth, Employment, Occupational Risks and the management of the Municipal Unit of Territorial Analysis (UMAT). On March 23, Paneque became first deputy mayor and head of the area of Equality, Social Rights, Labor, Youth and Security, maintaining the position of spokesperson for the PSC municipal group and co-councilor of Santa Eugènia - Can Gibert del Pla.

In 2019, she again led the Socialist candidacy for Girona, obtaining 18.71% of the votes and 6 councilors,starting her third term as a councilor of Girona City Council. In the 2021 elections to the Parliament of Catalonia, she was the head of the PSC list for the Girona constituency and was elected as a deputy.[18] She ran as a mayoral candidate in the 2023 municipal elections, coming in first place with 25.22% and 8 councilors, but did not win the mayoralty, which went to Lluc Salellas, of Guanyem Girona, after the pact with Junts and ERC.

A year later, after the 2024 elections to the Parliament of Catalonia, with the electoral victory of the Socialists, she was appointed Minister of Territory, Housing and Ecological Transition in the government of Salvador Illa i Roca. In addition to the positions in the Catalan executive, Sílvia Paneque maintains her seat in parliament as a deputy of the Socialists and United for Advance Parliamentary Group in the 15th legislature. One of the first actions taken by the minister and spokesperson in this mandate was to form her team to lead the department, with a general secretariat and three sectoral secretariats, and to appoint the PSC's organizational secretary in the Girona regions, Alfons Jiménez, who had already worked with the President of the Generalitat, José Montilla, and the mayor of Girona, Anna Pagans, as head of cabinet of her own ministry, an action that was harshly criticized as nepotism and for having been published with alleged secrecy during a Sunday in August. As head of External Relations and Protocol of the ministry, she appointed Quim Lladó, professor of Protocol of the Degree in Advertising and Public Relations of the University of Girona, who until then had served as head of press and protocol of the Delegation of the Generalitat in Girona.

The minister appointed the historic Valencian politician Jordi Terrades as secretary general of the Department of Territory, Housing and Ecological Transition to address, among other challenges, the transfer of Rodalies.Paneque initially maintained a good part of the senior positions of the former Department of Climate Action with the ERC government. Among her priorities, she stated her support for improving high-speed connections and renewable energies and, especially for improving housing policies.
