= Olga Pané =

Olga Pané i Mena
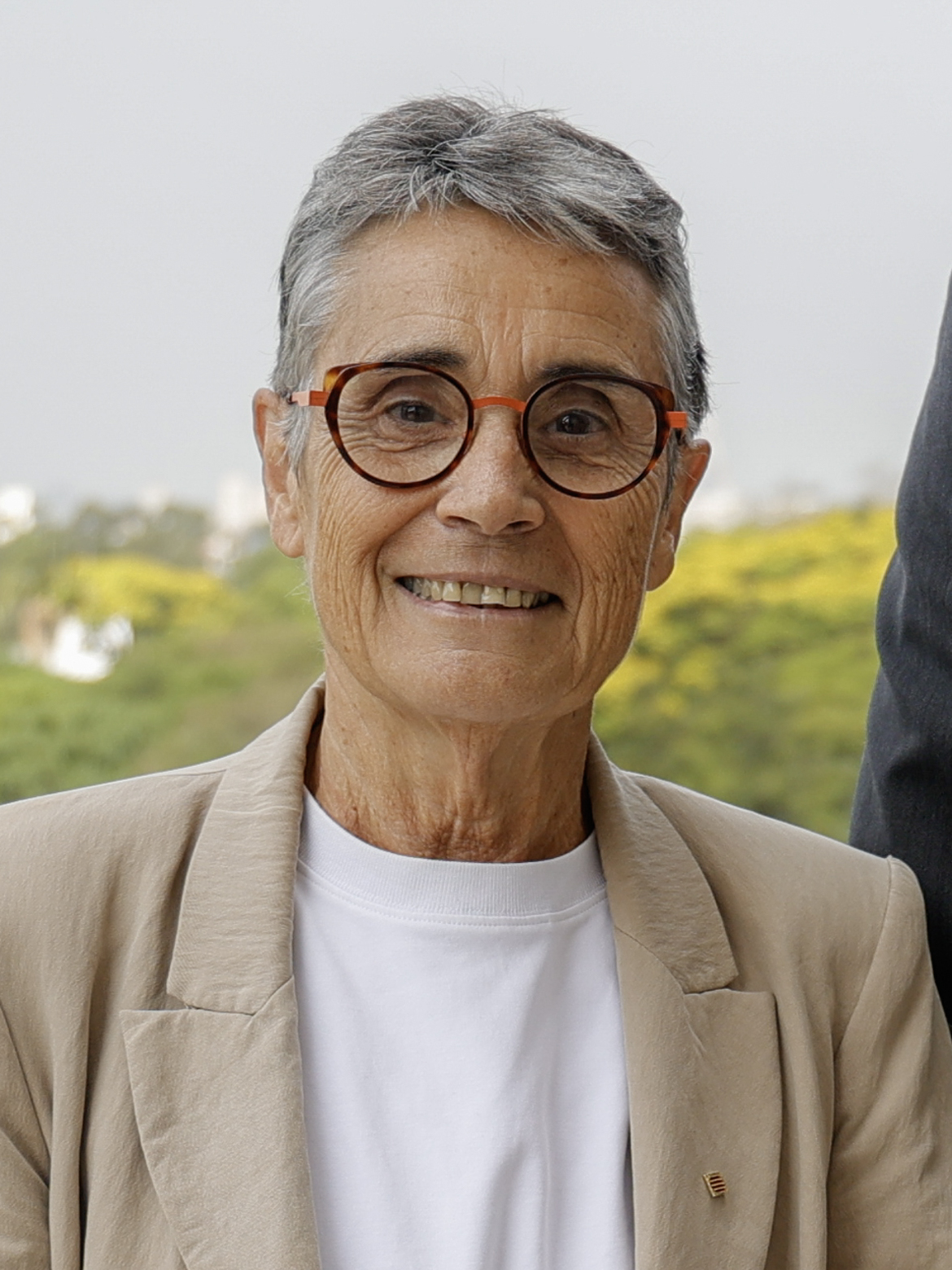

Minister of Health
- Incumbent
- Assumed office 12 August 2024
- President: Salvador Illa
- Preceded by: Manuel Balcells i Díaz

Personal details
- Born: 30 July 1956 (age 69) Barcelona, Catalonia
- Party: Socialists' Party of Catalonia
- Occupation: Politician

Olga Pané i Mena (born July 30, 1956, in Barcelona) is a Catalan doctor and politician from the Socialists' Party of Catalonia who was appointed to the position of Minister of Health of the Generalitat of Catalonia in the government of the Generalitat of August 2024.
