= Jaume Duch =

The Honourable Jaume Duch
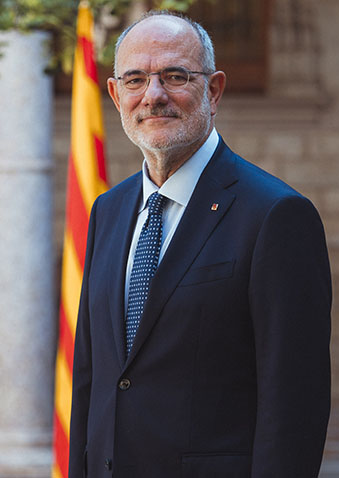

Minister of European Union and Foreign Action of Catalonia
- Incumbent
- Assumed office 12 August 2024
- President: Salvador Illa
- Preceded by: Meritxell Serret

Director-General for Communication and Spokesperson of the European Parliament
- In office February 2017 – 12 August 2024

Personal details
- Born: February 1962 (age 64) Barcelona, Spain
- Party: Centrists of Catalonia (1980–1983)
- Other political affiliations: UCD (1980–1983)

Jaume Duch Guillot (Catalan pronunciation: [ˈʒawmə ˈdug giˈʎɔt]; born 4 February 1962), is a Spanish politician, currently serving as Minister of European Union and Foreign Action of Catalonia since 2024 and former spokesperson of the European Parliament and Director-General of Communication of the institution, a position he held between February 2017 and August 2024, after more than a decade as the Media Director.

== Function ==
As the spokesperson of the European Parliament Duch Guillot responds to media inquiries, namely by the accredited Brussels-based correspondents, on matters relating to the European Parliament as an institution. In this capacity he regularly chairs press briefings on the activities of Parliament's plenary meetings and supports the Parliament's President in his relations with the media at different occasions.

Since February 2017, he is also the Director-General for Communication at the European Parliament. He is in charge of the Media Directorate – which includes the press service, the online communication unit, audiovisual services and the online television 'EuroparlTV'-, the Citizens' Relations Directorate and the information offices of the European Parliament in the Member States.

== Biographical Information ==
Before becoming spokesperson and director, Duch Guillot was head of the Media Directorate (2006–2017), the press room unit (1999–2006) and press adviser with the private office of the then President of the European Parliament José Maria Gil-Robles (1997–1999).

He started his career within the Parliament administration as an official in 1990, prior to which he was an assistant to a Member of the European Parliament (1987–1989) from a Catalan party and associate professor for international public law and European law at the University of Barcelona (1986–1990). He holds a Master in law from the University of Barcelona.

In July 2006, he held the post of Media Director and spokesman for the European Parliament, firstly on an interim basis and since July 2008 as a permanent position.

In February 2017, he was appointed Director General of Communication of the European Parliament, a charge that he combines with being the spokesman.

Duch Guillot speaks Spanish, Catalan, English, French and Italian. He is married with three children and lives in Brussels. He has published various articles on matters related to the EU and communication.

Since June 2014 he is a member of the Advisory Board of Jean Monnet Fondation, based in Lausanne (Switzerland).

That same year he received the "Best Spokesperson Award", awarded by the Catalan Journalists' Association.

In December 2016 he was awarded by Aquí Europa, a Spanish publication specializing in information on the European Union, in the category of "Distinguished Spanish personality in communication that has promoted the European project".
