= Miquel Buch =

Spanish politician

The Honourable Miquel Buch
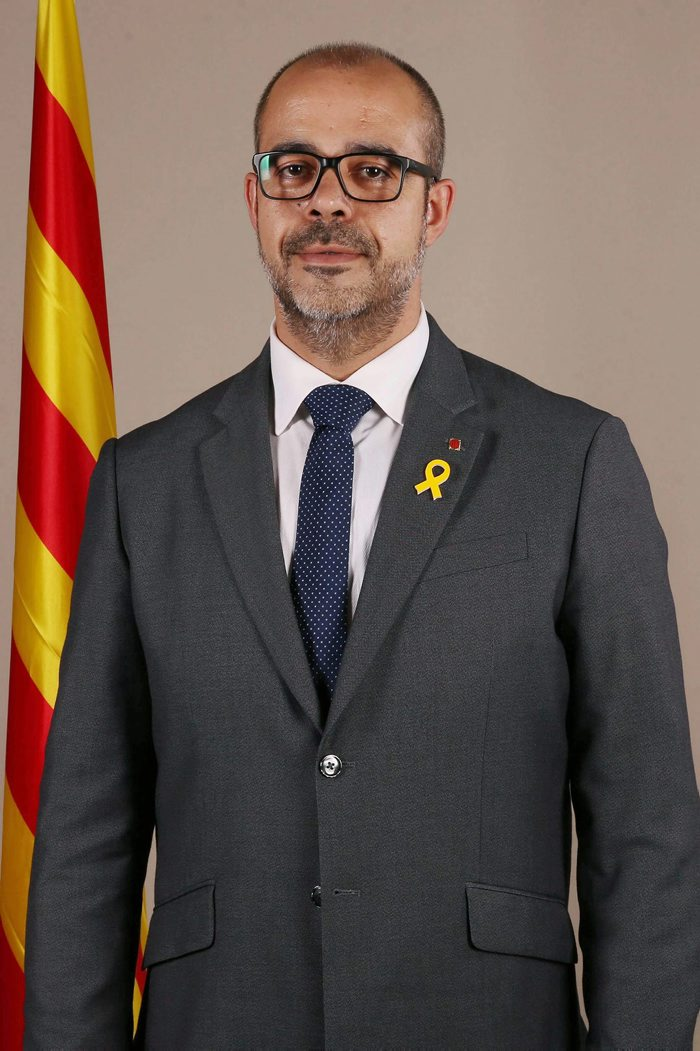
- Buch in June 2018

Catalan Minister of the Interior
- In office 2 June 2018 – 3 September 2020
- President: Quim Torra
- Preceded by: Joaquim Forn (Direct rule from 27 October 2017)
- Succeeded by: Miquel Sàmper

Mayor of Premià de Mar
- In office February 2007 – December 2017
- Preceded by: Jaume Batlle i Garriga
- Succeeded by: Miquel Àngel Méndez Gil

Member of the Municipality Council of Premià de Mar
- In office 2000 – December 2017
- Preceded by: Lluís Cerdà

Personal details
- Born: Miquel Buch i Moya; 3 August 1975 (age 51) Premià de Mar, Catalonia, Spain
- Citizenship: Spanish
- Party: Together for Catalonia
- Website: miquelbuch.cat

Miquel Buch i Moya (born 3 August 1975) is a Spanish politician from Catalonia, Minister of the Interior of the autonomous community between 2018 and 2020. He was previously mayor of Premià de Mar, a municipality in north-eastern Spain.

== Early life ==
Buch was born on 3 August 1975 in Premià de Mar, Catalonia. He joined the Nationalist Youth of Catalonia (Joventut Nacionalista de Catalunya, JNC) and Democratic Convergence of Catalonia (CDC) in 1996. He was national counsellor for JNC from 1997 to 2006 and for CDC since 2004. He was a doorman in Titus discotheque in Badalona.

== Career ==
Buch worked for the family business and the Red Cross before entering local politics. Buch contested the 1999 local elections as a Convergence and Union (CiU) electoral alliance candidate in Premià de Mar but failed to get elected. However, following the death of Lluís Cerdà he was appointed to the municipal council. He was re-elected at the 2003 local elections. After the election CiU formed an administration and Buch was appointed Deputy Mayor. He became Mayor of Premià de Mar following the death of Jaume Batlle i Garriga in February 2007. He was re-elected at the 2007, 2011 and 2015 local elections.

Buch has served as president of the Catalan Association of Municipalities and Counties (ACMC), president of the Council of Local Government of Catalonia and vice-president of the Association of Municipalities for Independence. He was also a member of the provincial deputation for Barcelona.

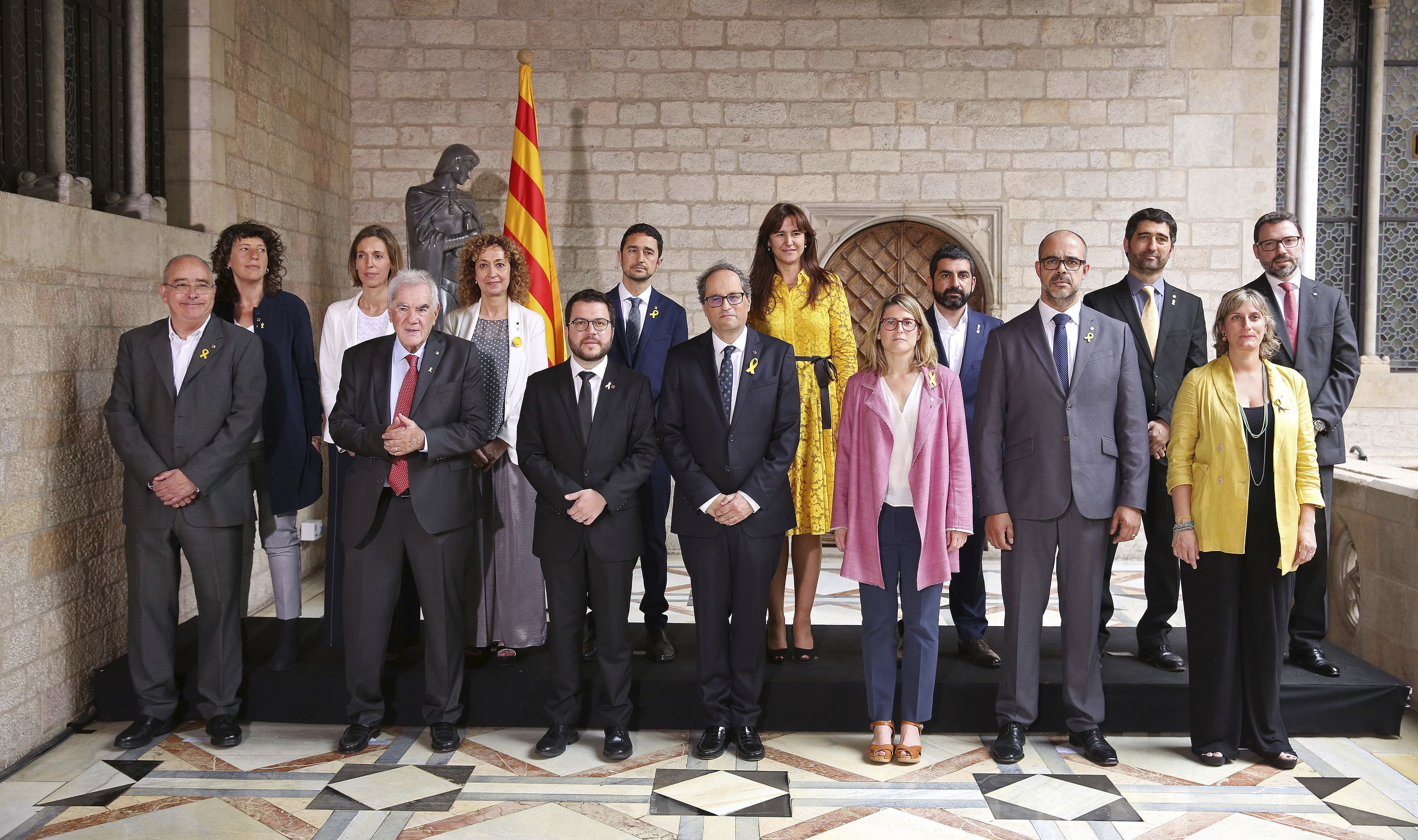
Buch and other members of the Catalan government on 2 June 2018

Buch resigned as mayor in December 2017. At the 2017 regional election Buch was placed 22nd on the Together for Catalonia (JuntsxCat) list of candidates in the Province of Barcelona but the alliance only managed to win 17 seats in the province and as a result he was not elected to the Parliament of Catalonia. At the election Catalan secessionists retained a slim majority in the Catalan Parliament. On 19 May 2018 newly elected President Quim Torra nominated a new government in which Buch was to be Minister of the Interior. He was sworn in on 2 June 2018 at the Palau de la Generalitat de Catalunya.

In July 2020 Buch joined the newly formed Together for Catalonia political party.

== Personal life ==
Buch is married to Cesca and has three children - Oriol, Biel and Clara. At 21 he was diagnosed with multiple sclerosis.

== Electoral history ==
Electoral history of Miquel Buch
Election	Constituency	Party	Alliance	No.	Result
1999 local	Premià de Mar	Democratic Convergence of Catalonia	Convergence and Union		Not elected
2003 local	Premià de Mar	Democratic Convergence of Catalonia	Convergence and Union	3	Elected
2007 local	Premià de Mar	Democratic Convergence of Catalonia	Convergence and Union	1	Elected
2011 local	Premià de Mar	Democratic Convergence of Catalonia	Convergence and Union	1	Elected
2015 local	Premià de Mar	Democratic Convergence of Catalonia	Convergence and Union	1	Elected
2017 regional	Province of Barcelona	Catalan European Democratic Party	Together for Catalonia	22	Not elected
