= Miquel Sàmper =

Spanish lawyer and politician

The Honourable Miquel Sàmper
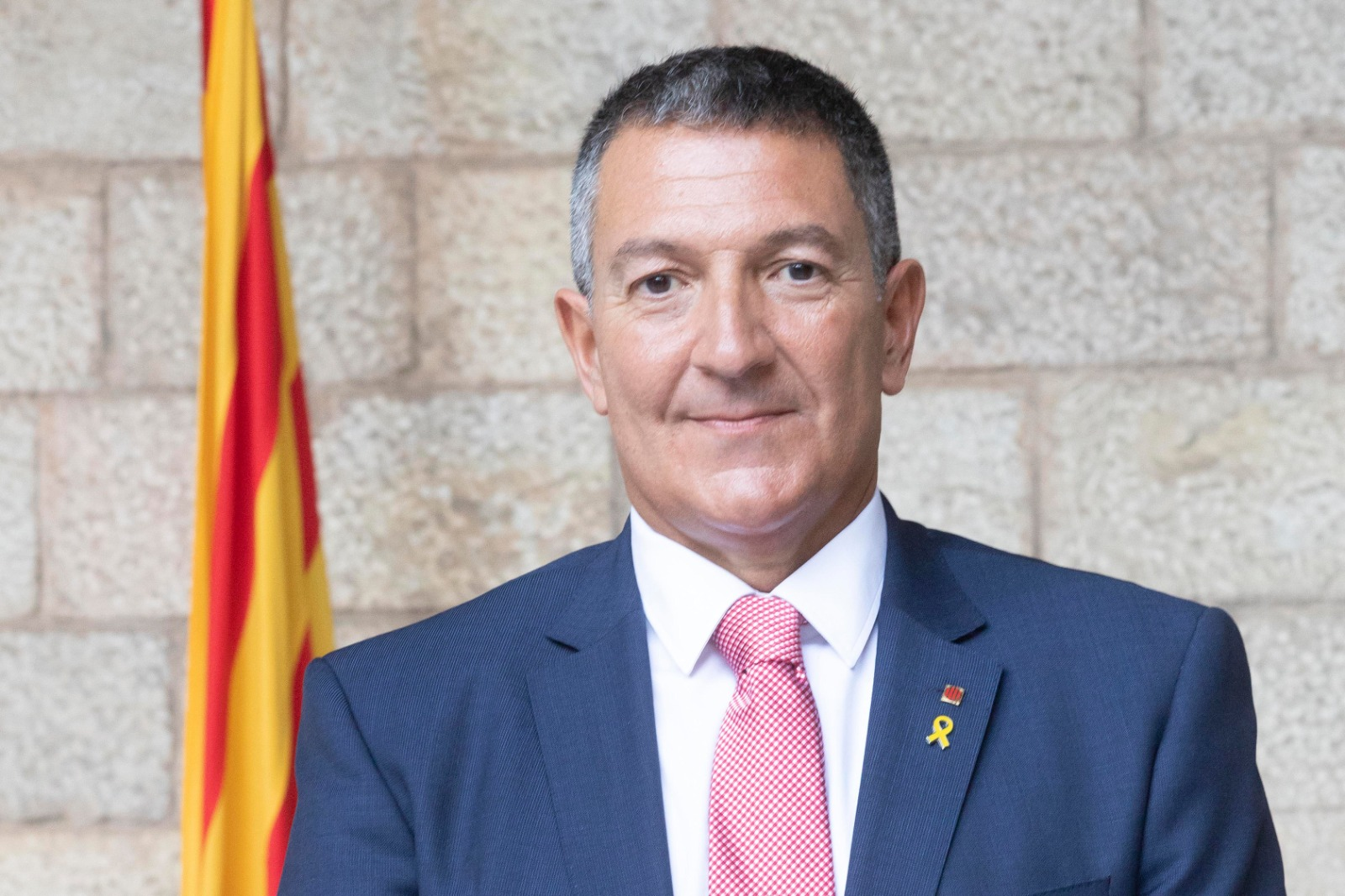

Minister of Business and Labour of Catalonia
- Incumbent
- Assumed office 12 August 2024
- President: Salvador Illa
- Preceded by: Roger Torrent

Minister of the Interior of Catalonia
- In office 3 September 2020 – 26 May 2021
- President: Quim Torra
- Preceded by: Miquel Buch
- Succeeded by: Joan Ignasi Elena

Personal details
- Born: 1966 (age 59–60) Terrassa, Catalonia, Spain
- Citizenship: Spanish
- Party: Independent (since 2024)
- Other political affiliations: Junts (2020–2024); PDeCAT (2016–2020); CDC (until 2016)
- Spouse: Montse Riba
- Children: 4

Miquel Sàmper i Rodríguez (born 1966) is a Spanish lawyer and politician from Catalonia and, since 12 August 2024, Minister of Business and Labour of Catalonia of the Generalitat de Catalunya.

He was also Minister of the Interior from 2020 to 2021.

== Career ==
He received a degree in Law and Political Science. Before he entered politics, he owned a law office in his hometown of Terrassa. He was Dean of the Bar Association of Terrace, President of the Catalan Lawyers and Deputy President of the General Council of Spanish Lawyers. He was also one of the promoters of the first Mortgage Brokerage Office in Spain.

In 2015, he was the CiU candidate for mayor of Terrassa and finished in fourth place with three councilors. After the elections, he and his party abstained during the mayoral election, thereby facilitating the election of Jordi Ballart, the PSC candidate, as mayor. Four years later, he ran for re-election, this time under the name of Junts per Terrassa. However, he ran as number two on the party list, giving the number one spot to the exiled councilor Lluís Puig. His party won two seats in that election.

On 3 September 2020, during a cabinet reshuffle, he was chosen by Catalan President Quim Torra to replace Miquel Buch as Minister of the Interior of the Generalitat de Catalunya.
