= Eva Menor =

Eva Menor Cantador
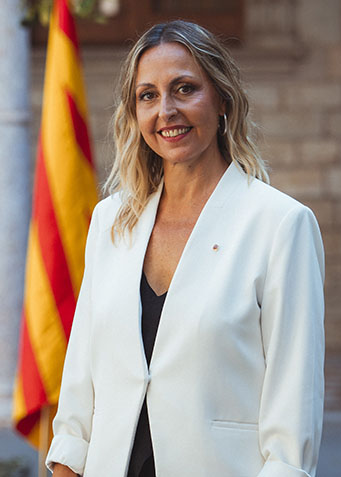

Minister of Equality and Feminism
- Incumbent
- Assumed office 12 August 2024
- President: Salvador Illa
- Preceded by: Tània Verge

Member of the Parliament of Catalonia
- Incumbent
- Assumed office 12 May 2024
- Constituency: Barcelona

Mayor of Badia del Valles
- In office 21 March 2009 – 28 June 2024
- Preceded by: José Luis Jimeno Sáez
- Succeeded by: Josep Martínez Valencia

Personal details
- Born: 21 September 1972 (age 53) Madrid
- Party: Socialists' Party of Catalonia
- Education: Autonomous University of Madrid
- Occupation: Politician,Lawyer

Eva Menor Cantador (Madrid, 21 September 1972) is a Catalan lawyer and politician, Minister of the Department of Equality and Feminism of the Government of the Generalitat of Catalonia since August 2024. Previously, she was mayor of Badia del Vallès between 2009 and 2024. She is a member of the Socialist Party of Catalonia.

== Biography ==
Eva Menor Born in 1972 in Madrid, she graduated in law from the Autonomous University of Madrid (UAM). A lawyer by profession and established in Badia del Vallès, she joined the Socialist Party of Catalonia (PSC) in 1998. A councillor of the Badia del Vallès City Council since 2003, on 21 March 2009 she was inaugurated as mayor of the municipality, replacing José Luis Jimeno. On 25 September 2014 she entered as a member of the plenary session of the Provincial Council of Barcelona, after the resignation of Manuel Bustos as provincial deputy.

She was elected as a deputy of the Parliament of Catalonia in the last Catalan elections on May 12, 2024. On June 26, 2024, she resigned as mayor of Badia del Vallès in an extraordinary plenary session.
