= Joan Ignasi Elena =

Spanish politician (born 1968)

The Honourable Joan Ignasi Elena
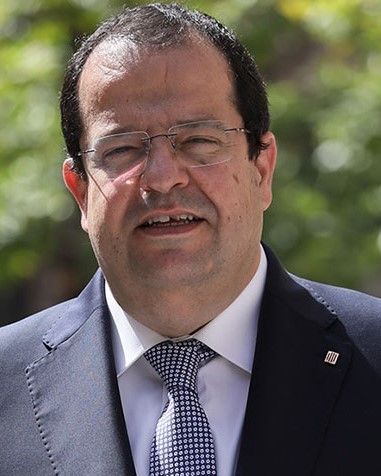
- Elena in May 2021

Minister of the Interior of Catalonia
- In office 26 May 2021 – 12 August 2024
- President: Pere Aragonès
- Preceded by: Miquel Sàmper
- Succeeded by: Núria Parlón

Member of the Parliament of Catalonia
- In office 17 December 2012 – 30 September 2014
- Succeeded by: Sergi Vilamala i Bastarras
- Constituency: Barcelona
- In office 28 February 1994 – 26 September 1995
- Preceded by: Antoni Castells
- Constituency: Barcelona

Mayor of Vilanova i la Geltrú
- In office 14 July 2005 – 11 June 2011
- Preceded by: Sixte Moral i Reixach
- Succeeded by: Neus Lloveras i Massana

Member of Vilanova i la Geltrú Municipal Council
- In office 1999–2011

Personal details
- Born: Joan Ignasi Elena i Garcia; 27 June 1968 (age 58) Barcelona, Catalonia, Spain
- Citizenship: Spanish
- Party: Avancem
- Education: University of Barcelona
- Occupation: Lawyer

Joan Ignasi Elena i Garcia (born 27 June 1968) is a Spanish lawyer and politician from Catalonia, former member of the Parliament of Catalonia and the current Minister of the Interior of Catalonia.

== Early life ==
Elena was born on 27 June 1968 in Barcelona, Catalonia. He has a degree in law from the University of Barcelona. He joined the Socialist Youth of Catalonia (Joventut Socialista de Catalunya) in 1983 and was its first secretary from 1991 to 1993. He joined the Socialists' Party of Catalonia (PSC) in 1986 and was a youth councillor in Horta-Guinardó from 1987 to 1991.

== Career ==
Elena is a lawyer specialising in employment and copyright law.

At the 1992 regional election Elena was placed 30th on PSC's list of candidates in the Province of Barcelona but the party only managed to win 27 seats in the province and as a result he failed to get elected. However, in February 1994, he was appointed to the Parliament of Catalonia following the resignation of Antoni Castells. At the 1995 regional election he was placed 30th on PSC's list of candidates in the Province of Barcelona but the party only managed to win 22 seats in the province and as a result he failed to get re-elected. At the 1999 regional election Elena was placed 39th on the Socialists' Party of Catalonia-Citizens for Change electoral alliance's list of candidates in the Province of Barcelona but the party only managed to win 36 seats in the province and as a result he failed to get elected.

Elena contested the 1999 local elections as a Socialists' Party of Catalonia–Municipal Progress electoral alliance candidate in Vilanova i la Geltrú and was elected. He was re-elected at the 2003 local elections. He succeeded Sixte Moral i Reixach as Mayor of Vilanova i la Geltrú in 2005. He was re-elected at the 2007 local elections.

At the PSC's 12th congress in December 2011 Elena ran for the leadership of the party but was resoundingly defeated by Pere Navarro, receiving 187 votes (25%) to Navarro's 545 votes (73%). In June 2012 Elena and other PSC members supportive of a referendum in Catalan independence formed Avancem. Elena contested the 2012 regional election as PSC candidate in the Province of Barcelona and was elected to the Parliament of Catalonia. In January 2013 five PSC MPs (Elena, Marina Geli, Rocío Martínez-Sampere, Àngel Ros and Núria Ventura) did not vote on the Parliamentary Catalan Declaration of Sovereignty, going against party policy to oppose the declaration.

In January 2014 Elena, Geli and Ventura went against PSC policy and supported a motion in the Parliament of Catalonia asking the Congress of Deputies for the power to hold a consultation on the possibility of Catalan independence. The party leadership requested the three dissident MPs to resign from Parliament. The trio were stripped of the party positions in Parliament and relegated to backbenchers. Elena resigned from the Socialists Group in Parliament in July 2014 and in September 2014 joined the Mixed Group. He resigned from Parliament in September 2014. Avancem formally split from PSC in June 2014 and started discussions with New Catalan Left about forming an alliance but these discussions collapsed in November 2014.

In December 2016, the Government of Catalonia established the National Pact for the Referendum (Pacte Nacional pel Referèndum) to bring together those who favoured holding a referendum on Catalan independence in agreement with the Spanish state. Elena was appointed chair of the organisation. In March 2017 Elena presented a petition signed by 500,000 supporting a referendum but the Spanish government refused to consider a referendum on self-determination. In July 2017 he was interviewed by the Civil Guard investigating preparations for the proposed unilateral referendum.

During the Trial of Catalonia independence leaders Elena acted as Republican Left of Catalonia's legal co-ordinator and accompanied the defendants during their defence in court. During the 2018 Catalan government formation, he was nominated by ERC to be Minister of Health but ultimately wasn't appointed by President Quim Torra due to the need to balance the distribution of portfolios amongst the coalition partners.

On 26 May 2021 he was sworn in as Minister of the Interior in the new government of President Pere Aragonès.

== Electoral history ==
Electoral history of Joan Ignasi Elena
Election	Constituency	Party	Alliance	No.	Result
1992 regional	Province of Barcelona	Socialists' Party of Catalonia		30	Not elected
1995 regional	Province of Barcelona	Socialists' Party of Catalonia		30	Not elected
1999 local	Vilanova i la Geltrú	Socialists' Party of Catalonia	Socialists' Party of Catalonia-Municipal Progress	7	Elected
1999 regional	Province of Barcelona	Socialists' Party of Catalonia	Socialists' Party of Catalonia-Citizens for Change	39	Not elected
2003 local	Vilanova i la Geltrú	Socialists' Party of Catalonia	Socialists' Party of Catalonia-Municipal Progress	5	Elected
2007 local	Vilanova i la Geltrú	Socialists' Party of Catalonia	Socialists' Party of Catalonia-Municipal Progress	1	Elected
2012 regional	Province of Barcelona	Socialists' Party of Catalonia		4	Elected
