= Òscar Ordeig =

Spanish politician (born 1978)

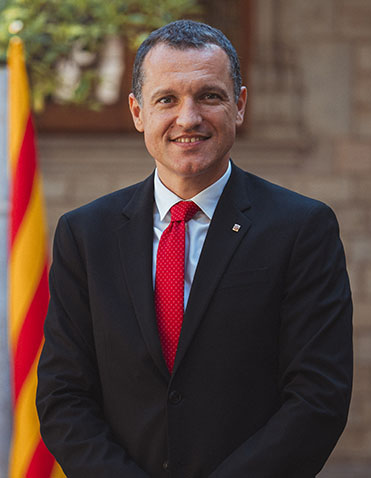
- Ordeig in 2024

Minister of Agriculture of Catalonia
- Incumbent
- Assumed office 12 August 2024
- President: Salvador Illa
- Preceded by: David Mascort

Personal details
- Born: 14 March 1978 (age 48)
- Party: Socialists' Party of Catalonia

Òscar Ordeig i Molist (born 14 March 1978) is a Spanish politician serving as minister of agriculture of Catalonia since 2024. He has been a member of the Parliament of Catalonia since 2014.
