= Raúl Moreno (politician) =

Spanish politician (born 1978)

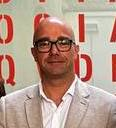
- Moreno in 2024

Member of the Parliament of Catalonia
- In office 26 October 2015 – 27 August 2024
- Constituency: Barcelona

Personal details
- Born: 20 December 1978 (age 47)
- Party: Socialists' Party of Catalonia (since 1996)

Raúl Moreno Montaña (born 20 December 1978) is a Spanish politician serving as secretary general of social rights and inclusion of Catalonia since 2024. From 2015 to 2024, he was a member of the Parliament of Catalonia.
