= Baldiri Alavedra =

Spanish footballer (1944–2020)

Personal information
- Full name: Baldiri Alavedra Pla
- Date of birth: 21 February 1944
- Place of birth: Gavà, Spain
- Date of death: 13 April 2020 (aged 76)
- Place of death: Gavà, Spain
- Height: 1.77 m (5 ft 10 in)
- Position: Midfielder

Senior career*
Years	Team	Apps	(Gls)
1963–1965	Condal	4	(0)
1965–1966	Sabadell	10	(0)
1966–1967	Condal	19	(0)
1967–1968	Xerez	7	(0)
1968–1969	Terrassa		
1969–1971	Gramenet		
1971–1975	Gavà		
Total		40+	(0+)
- * Club domestic league appearances and goals

Baldiri Alavedra Pla (21 February 1944 – 13 April 2020) was a Spanish professional footballer who played as a midfielder.

== Career ==
Born in Gavà, Alavedra played for Condal, Sabadell, Xerez, Terrassa, Gramenet and Gavà.

== Later life and death ==
Alavedra died from COVID-19 in Gavà, on 13 April 2020, at the age of 76, during the COVID-19 pandemic in Spain.
