= Alícia Romero =

Spanish politician (born 1976)

The Honourable Alícia Romero MP
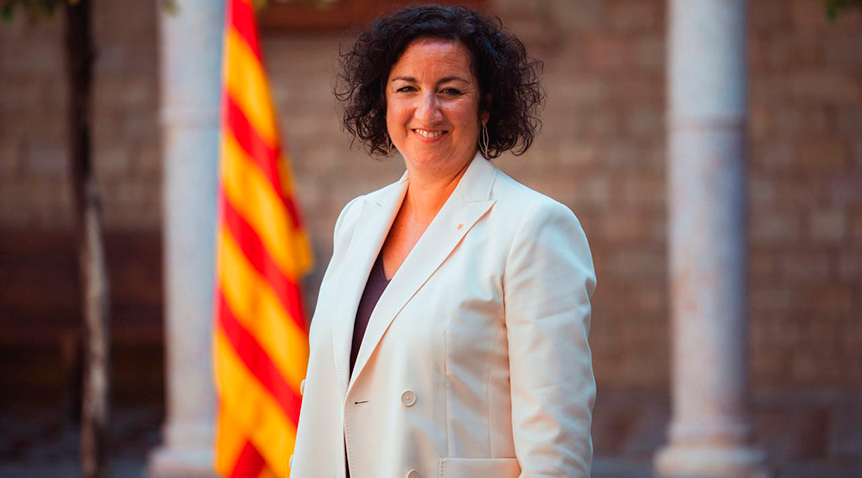
- Romero in 2024

Minister of Economy and Finance of Catalonia
- Incumbent
- Assumed office 12 August 2024
- President: Salvador Illa
- Preceded by: Natàlia Mas

Spokesperson of the Socialist Group in the Parliament of Catalonia
- In office 12 March 2021 – 12 August 2024
- Preceded by: Eva Granados
- Succeeded by: Elena Díaz

Member of the Parliament of Catalonia
- Incumbent
- Assumed office 17 December 2012
- Constituency: Barcelona

Member of the Mataró City Council
- In office 4 July 1999 – 11 June 2011

Personal details
- Born: 20 June 1976 (age 50) Caldes d'Estrac, Spain
- Party: Socialists' Party of Catalonia
- Education: Pompeu Fabra University; ESADE Business School

Alícia Romero Llano (born 20 June 1976) is a Spanish politician of the Socialists' Party of Catalonia who has served in the Parliament of Catalonia since 2012. She previously served on the city council of Mataró, where she was deputy mayor from 2005 to 2011. In 2024, she was designated as Minister of Economy and Finance of Catalonia in the government of Salvador Illa.
