= Esther Niubó =

Spanish politician (born 1980)

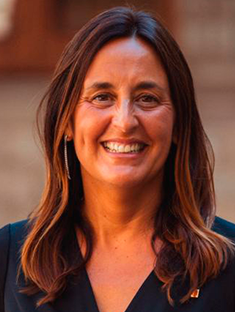
- Niubó in 2024

Minister of Education of Catalonia
- Incumbent
- Assumed office 12 August 2024
- President: Salvador Illa
- Preceded by: Anna Simó

Personal details
- Born: 1 October 1980 (age 45)
- Party: Socialists' Party of Catalonia (since 2002)

Esther Niubó Cidoncha (born 1 October 1980) is a Spanish politician serving as minister of education of Catalonia since 2024. She has been a member of the Parliament of Catalonia since 2015.
