= Núria Parlón =

Spanish politician

The Honourable Núria Parlón
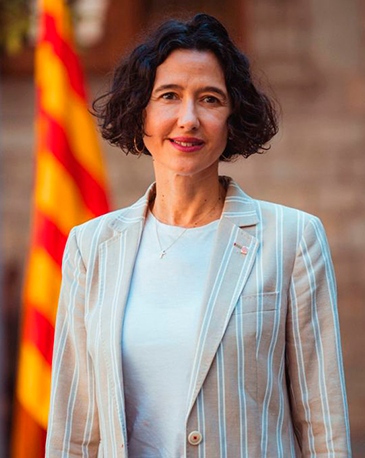

Minister of the Interior of Catalonia
- Incumbent
- Assumed office 12 August 2024
- President: Salvador Illa
- Preceded by: Joan Ignasi Elena

Mayor of Santa Coloma de Gramenet
- In office 17 November 2009 – 12 August 2024
- Preceded by: Bartolomé Muñoz Calvet
- Succeeded by: Mireia González

Personal details
- Born: 2 August 1974 (age 52) Barcelona, Catalonia, Spain
- Party: Socialists' Party of Catalonia
- Children: 1
- Education: Pompeu Fabra University

Núria Parlon Gil (born 2 August 1974) is a Spanish politician who belongs to the Socialists' Party of Catalonia. She served as Mayor of Santa Coloma de Gramenet between 2009 and 2024.
