= Albert Dalmau Miranda =

Spanish politician (born 1990)

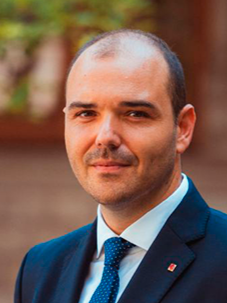
- Dalmau in 2024

Minister of the Presidency of Catalonia
- Incumbent
- Assumed office 12 August 2024
- President: Salvador Illa
- Preceded by: Laura Vilagrà

Personal details
- Born: 1990 (age 35–36)
- Party: Socialists' Party of Catalonia

Albert Dalmau Miranda (born 1990) is a Spanish politician serving as minister of the presidency of Catalonia since 2024. From 2023 to 2024, he was chief executive of the City Council of Barcelona.
