= Eduard Rius =

Spanish politician (1953–2023)

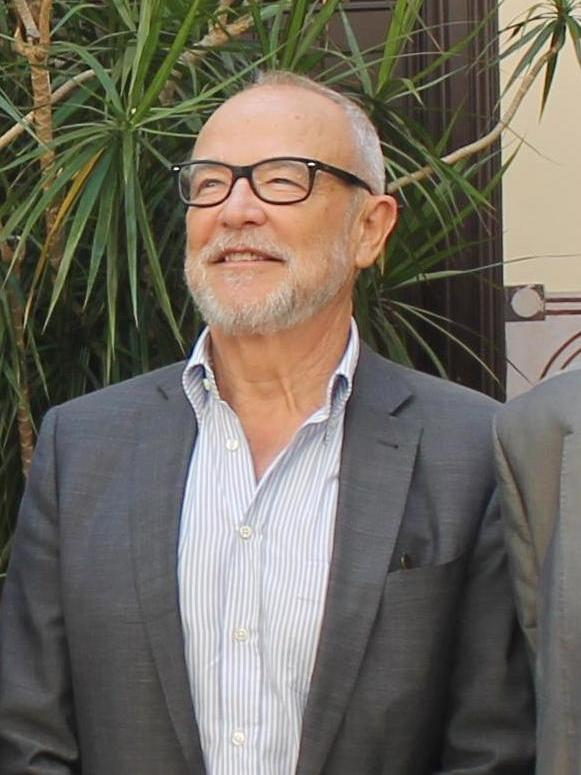
- Rius in 2016

Member of the Parliament of Catalonia
- In office 25 October 1999 – 23 September 2003

Minister of Health and Social Security of Catalonia
- In office 11 January 1996 – 4 November 2002
- Preceded by: Xavier Trias
- Succeeded by: Xavier Pomés

Personal details
- Born: Eduard Rius i Pey; 13 April 1953 Tarragona, Spain
- Died: 11 December 2023 (aged 70)
- Party: CDC
- Education: University of Barcelona
- Occupation: Physician

Eduard Rius i Pey (13 April 1953 – 11 December 2023) was a Spanish politician. A member of the Democratic Convergence of Catalonia, he served in the Parliament of Catalonia from 1999 to 2003.

Rius died on 11 December 2023, at the age of 70.
