= Joan Maria Pujals i Vallvé =

Joan Maria Pujals i Vallvé (born 24 June 1957) is a Catalan politician, counselor of the Generalitat of Catalonia and a Member of the Parliament of Catalonia in the fourth, fifth and sixth legislatures.

== Biography ==
He has a degree in Catalan Philology from the University of Barcelona, a diploma in Business Management from IESE and a Higher Technician in Public Administration. He has been Deputy Secretary of the International Association of Catalan Language and Literature (AILLC). He has chaired the Organizing Committee of the VII International Colloquium on Catalan Language and Literature (1982–1985). He was an Adviser to the Brau-theater group (1979–1982), which won the Serra d'Or Critics and Stanislavski Foundation Awards in Denmark.

Militant of Democratic Convergence of Catalonia, in the Spanish municipal elections of 1983 he was elected mayor of Vila-seca i Salou, a post he held until the Spanish municipal election of 1991, when he was elected mayor of Vila-seca until January 1993.

During his tenure as mayor he promoted tourism development in the area, thanks in particular to the creation of Port Aventura. From 1988 to 1992 he was President of the Diputación de Tarragona.

He was elected Member of the Parliament of Catalonia's elections in 1992, 1995 and 1999. In 1992 he was appointed Minister of Education of the Generalitat de Catalunya. During his term, the Criteria and Measures for the Implementation of the Educational Reform were approved (1994), the School Map of Catalonia, the Multiannual Investment Plan 1995-2000, the Trade Union Agreement (1995), the first Convention. with the Barcelona City Council (1995) and the Social Agreement (1996). He was responsible for the implantation of the linguistic model in the educational system of Catalonia, which was favorably sanctioned by the Spanish Constitutional Court.

In 1996 he left the Ministry of Education and was appointed Minister of Culture (with the General Secretariat for Sports and Youth). From the new post he promoted the approval of the Law on Language Policy (1998), with a favorable vote of 80% of the members of the Parliament of Catalonia, and also the Law of Support for Catalan Selections (1999). During its time, the Master Plan for Sports Facilities and Equipment of Catalonia was approved and the Gran Teatre del Liceu, the National Theater of Catalonia and the Auditorium of Barcelona were inaugurated. He left the ministry in 1999 after losing his temper with film distributors under the Film Act.

In January 2002, he resigned his seat and abandoned political activity. From 2002 to 2004 he was appointed director of the Institut Ramon Llull, a consortium created by the Catalan and Balearic governments with the support of the Ministry of Foreign Affairs of Spain to foster the external projection of the Catalan language and culture.

Since 2004 he has been dedicated to the private sector, creating the companies Óndisor, Impulsa, Grupo Ortiz and others. One of them, Sacresa, was involved in a real estate fraud of 30 million euros in the Consell Insular de Mallorca in which Maria Antònia Munar was tried. Joan Maria Pujals, however, was excused.

== Works ==
He has published articles in La Vanguardia, Avui, El Periódico, El País, ABC, Revista de Catalunya, Serra d'Or and others. In 2002 he received the Prat de la Riba Prize for newspaper articles.

- Study on Vila-seca and Salou (1978)
- The Athenian Pi and Margall (1979)
- Sant Bernat Calbó and its time (1980)
- Bat to Bat (1991)
- Nisan's Moon (1994)
- Landscapes of Tarragona. Costa Dorada (1995).
- Critical edition and prolog of Places and Fires of Ramon Muntanyola (1982)
- Critical edition of War and Exile Verses, by Artur Bladé i Desumvila,
- Critical edition of Complete Poetry, by Ramon Xirau
- The fights by the port of Salou (1983) Proceedings of the VII International Colloquium on Catalan Language and Literature (1986).
