= Antoni Subirà =

Spanish politician (1940–2018)

Antoni Subirà i Claus
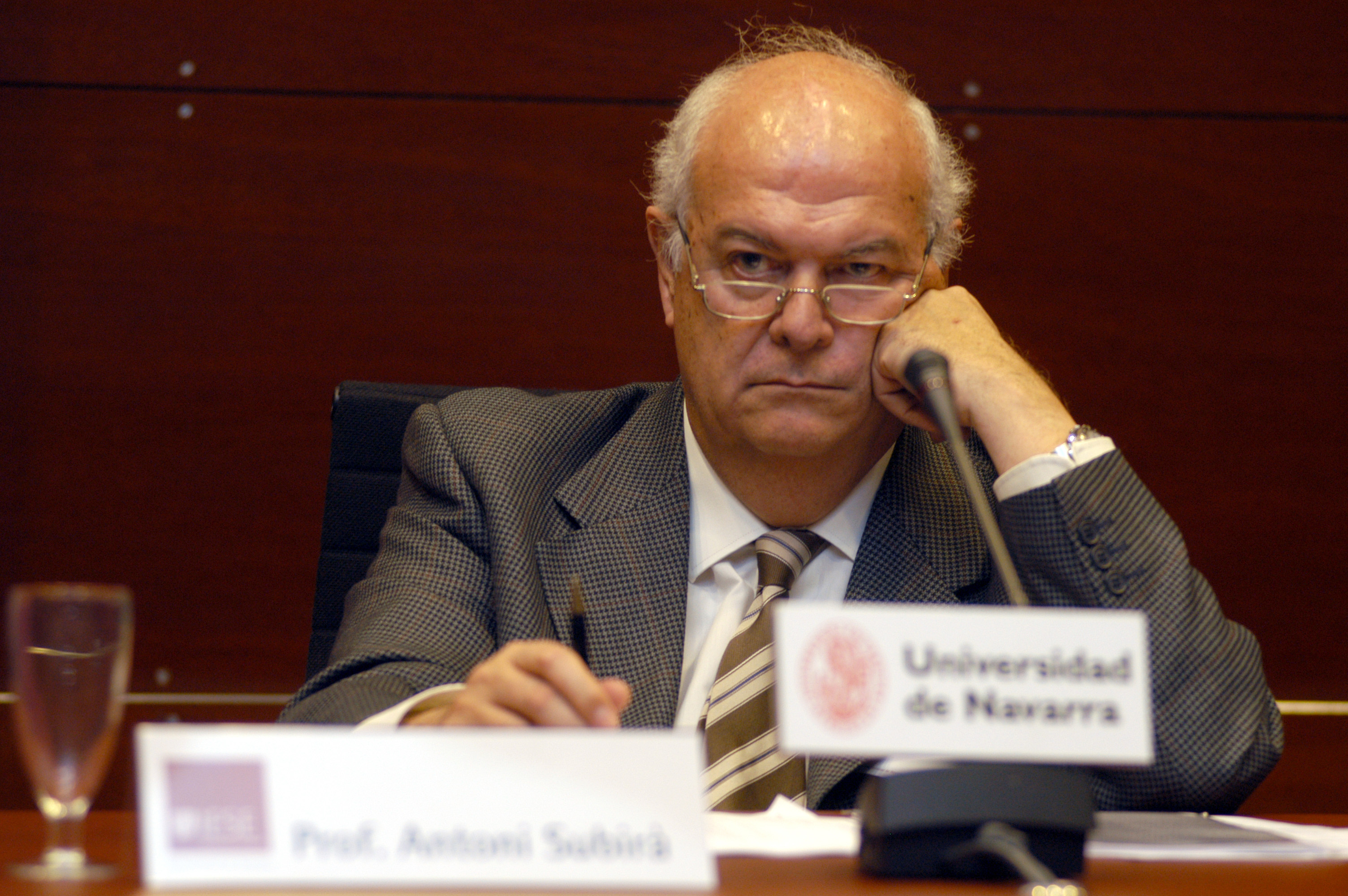
- Antoni Subirà

Member of the Parliament of Catalonia
- In office 1980–1993
- Constituency: Barcelona

Personal details
- Born: 19 February 1940 Mataró, Spain
- Died: 7 January 2018 (aged 77) Premià de Mar, Catalonia, Spain
- Party: Democratic Convergence of Catalonia

Antoni Subirà (19 February 1940 – 7 January 2018) was a Spanish politician who was a member of Parliament of Catalonia (1980–1993) and co-founder of Democratic Convergence of Catalonia.
