= Macià Alavedra =

Spanish politician

Macià Alavedra Moner
- Born: 26 March 1934; Barcelona, Spain
- Died: 29 September 2018 (aged 84); Barcelona, Spain
- Occupation: Politician
- Political party: Convergence and Union

Macià Alavedra Moner (26 March 1934 – 29 September 2018) was a Spanish politician from Convergence and Union. He served as a member of the constituent, first and third legislatures of the Congress of Deputies, representing Barcelona Province.

In October 2009 he was arrested on suspicion of involvement in corruption.

He died of leukemia in 2018.
