= Salvador Illa =

Spanish politician (born 1966)

The Right Honourable Salvador Illa MP
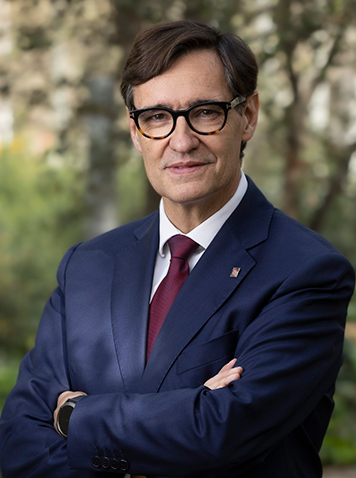
- Official portrait, 2024

President of the Government of Catalonia
- Incumbent
- Assumed office 10 August 2024
- Monarch: Felipe VI
- Preceded by: Pere Aragonès

Minister of Health of Spain
- In office 13 January 2020 – 27 January 2021
- Prime Minister: Pedro Sánchez
- Preceded by: María Luisa Carcedo
- Succeeded by: Carolina Darias

Leader of the Opposition in the Parliament of Catalonia
- In office 21 May 2021 – 10 August 2024
- President: Pere Aragonès
- Preceded by: Carlos Carrizosa
- Succeeded by: TBD

First Secretary of the Socialists' Party of Catalonia
- Incumbent
- Assumed office 19 December 2021
- Deputy: Meritxell Batet; Alícia Romero; Jaume Collboni; Lluïsa Moret; Marta Farrés
- Preceded by: Miquel Iceta

Mayor of La Roca del Vallès
- In office 4 June 1999 – 17 September 2005
- Preceded by: Josep Estapé Vilà
- Succeeded by: Rafael Ros Panedo
- In office 23 September 1995 – 5 February 1999
- Preceded by: Romà Planas i Miró
- Succeeded by: Josep Estapé Vilà

Member of the La Roca del Vallès City Council
- In office 30 June 1987 – 17 September 2005
- Constituency: Barcelona

Personal details
- Born: Salvador Illa Roca; 5 May 1966 (age 60) La Roca del Vallès, Catalonia, Spain
- Citizenship: Spain
- Party: Socialists' Party of Catalonia (since 1995)
- Other political affiliations: Independent (until 1995)
- Spouse: Marta Estruch Macías
- Children: 1
- Education: University of Barcelona (BA); University of Navarra (MBA)

Salvador Illa i Roca (Catalan pronunciation: [səlβəˈðo ˈiʎə ˈrɔkə]; born 5 May 1966) is a Spanish politician serving as the President of the Government of Catalonia since 2024. He also served as Minister of Health of Spain from 2020 to 2021. He has been the Secretary for Organization of the Socialists' Party of Catalonia since 2016, and the candidate for the presidency of Catalonia for this party. Previously, Illa served as Mayor of La Roca del Vallès from 1995 to 2005.

== Early years and studies ==
Born in La Roca del Vallès, Spain on 5 May 1966, Illa is the son of Josep Illa, a worker at the Textiles y Bordados (Textiles and Embroidery) factory in that municipality, and María Roca, who owned a small textile workshop. He has two younger brothers, Ramón and José María.

Illa attended Escola Pía School in Granollers and studied at the University of Barcelona, where he received his philosophy degree. He is Associate Professor of the Blanquerna School of Communication and International Relations. Illa also studied for a master's degree in economics and business management at the IESE Business School, University of Navarra. He completed compulsory military service, being discharged with the rank of alférez in a company of the Spanish Army Headquarters in Bruc, Barcelona.

== Early political career ==
He was elected councillor of the City Council of La Roca del Vallès in 1987 and he was appointed Councillor for Culture under Mayor Romà Planas i Miró. In 1995, he joined the Socialists' Party of Catalonia (PSC) and he became the replacement for the deceased mayor. During his first term, La Roca Village was built, a shopping center that attracts nearly 4 million visitors each year.

He was ousted as mayor after a successful vote of no confidence in early 1999, but he soon made a comeback as his party commanded a qualified majority at the June 1999 local elections. In 2009, he moved to the private sector, becoming CEO of the audiovisual production company Cromosoma, a position he held for nine months.

In September 2005, he was appointed Director-General for Infrastructure Management of the Department of Justice of the Regional Government of Catalonia. From 2010 to 2011 he was Director of the Economic Management Office of the City Council of Barcelona and Coordinator of the Local Socialist Group in the City Council from 2011 to 2016.

=== Secretary for Organization of PSC ===
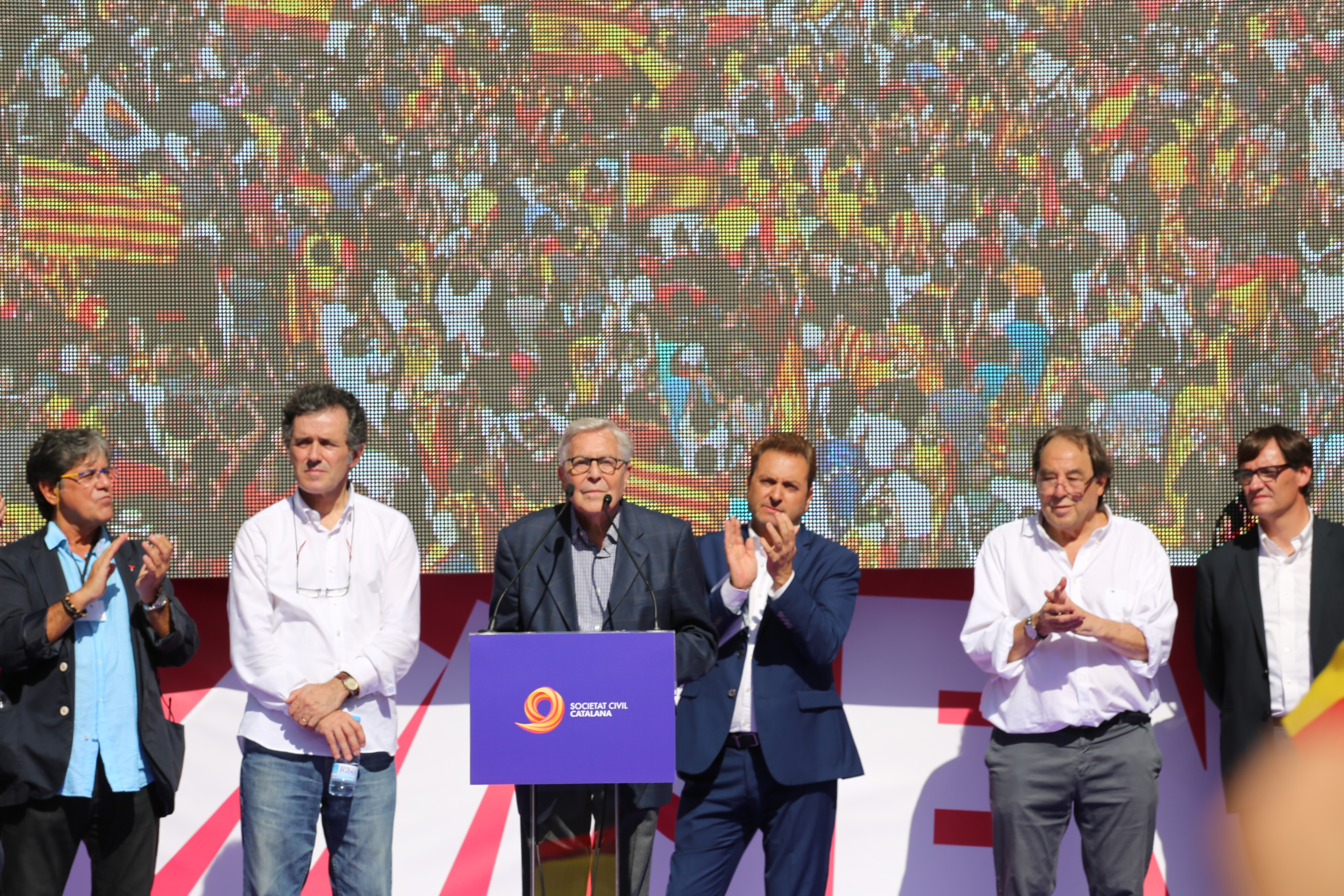
Illa (right), photographed at the October 8, 2017 demonstration along with Carlos Jiménez Villarejo and Francesc de Carreras, among others.

In November 2016, the PSC's leader Miquel Iceta appointed him to the position of Secretary for Organization. Illa was the highest-rank politician from among the PSC cadres who attended the "Prou! Recuperem el seny" (English: Enough! Let's recover common sense) anti-independence demonstration in Barcelona on 8 October 2017 organized by Societat Civil Catalana.

Along with Adriana Lastra and José Luis Ábalos, Illa was part of the negotiating team of the PSOE that reached an agreement with the ERC for their abstention in the investiture of Pedro Sánchez in January 2020.

== Minister of Health ==
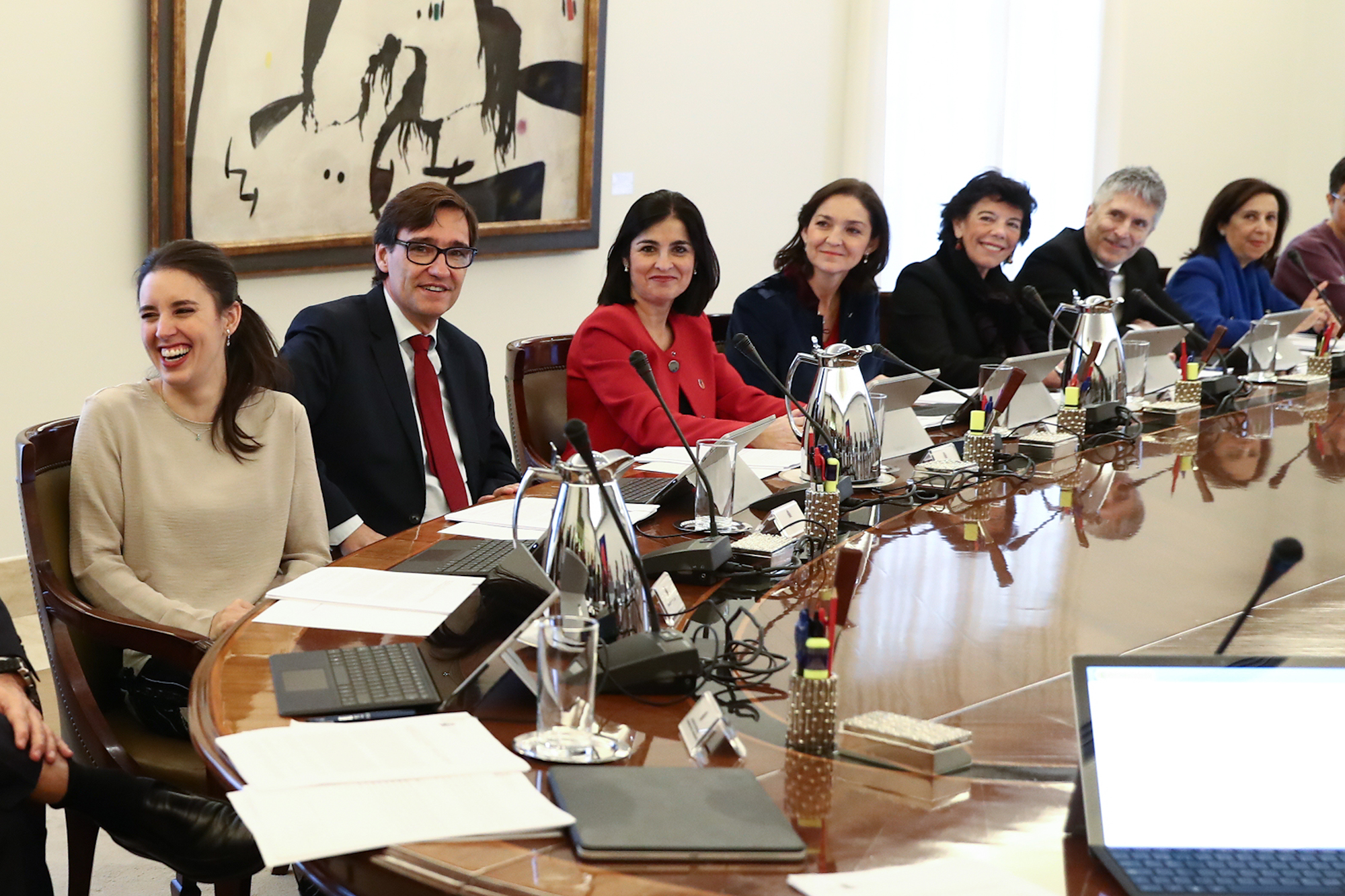
Illa in the first Cabinet meeting of the 14th Cortes Generales.

On 10 January 2020, he was unveiled as prospective Minister of Health, replacing María Luisa Carcedo. He was appointed by King Felipe VI of Spain on 13 January, taking oath before the Sovereign that day. Illa succeeded Carcedo in taking responsibility for public health affairs, but not in responsibilities for consumer affairs and social welfare, which were transferred to two newly established offices. Illa had no experience in health, his appointment was portrayed by the media as that of a "manager", noting that his possible role in the government was not merely carrying the health portfolio but a channel of communication with Catalan independentism.

=== COVID-19 pandemic ===
One of the first challenges faced by the minister was the outbreak of coronavirus in late 2019. Following the health crisis caused by COVID-19, various media reported that he temporarily moved to live at the Moncloa Palace.

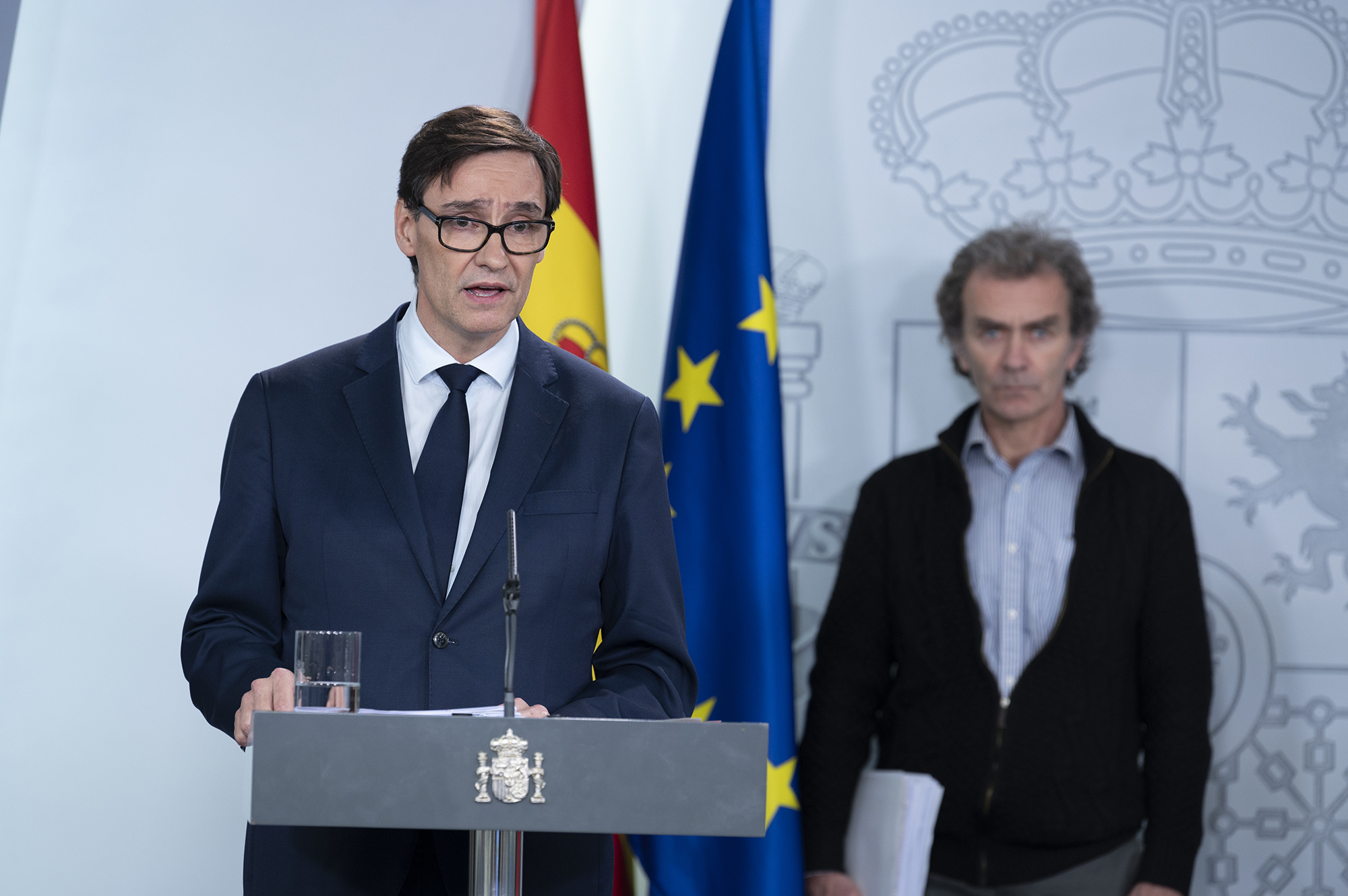
Illa during a press briefing to explain the measures taken by the Ministry of Health.

In late January 2020, the Ministry of Health, in coordination with the Ministry of Foreign Affairs, started the process to repatriate around twenty Spaniards from China. On 29 January it was announced that they would be held in quarantine for 14 days in a military hospital in Madrid. In a joint operation with the government of the United Kingdom, they arrived to Spain on 31 January and they were discharged on 13 February. The first case of coronavirus in Spain was recorded on 31 January 2020 in the Canary Island of La Gomera. The patient, one of a group of five people was taken into observation after they had come into contact with a German man diagnosed with the virus. Since then, multiple cases were recorded. On 3 March 2020, the health authorities announced that a post-mortem test proved that the first coronavirus death in Spain occurred on 13 February 2020. That day, the health ministry suspended all medical conferences indefinitely to ensure the availability of all medical professionals and it recommended sports matches played against Italian teams be played without fans.

On 10 March, the central government, led by the Health Ministry, adopted more stringent measures. Among them were halting flights to Italy and banning large scale gatherings in Madrid, Basque Country, and La Rioja (regions with high risk of contagious). This measures were complemented with other ones taken by regional governments such as shut down schools by the regional governments of Madrid, the Basque Country and La Rioja, as well as the suspension of the Fallas by the Valencian government, after the recommendation of the Ministry of Health.

Throughout the pandemic, Illa appeared regularly at the Congressional Health Committee to report on the exceptional situation that Spain went through in relation to the COVID-19 pandemic, amid criticism from the political opposition for the management of his department. In June 2020, he announced a National Preparedness and Response Plan for possible outbreaks.

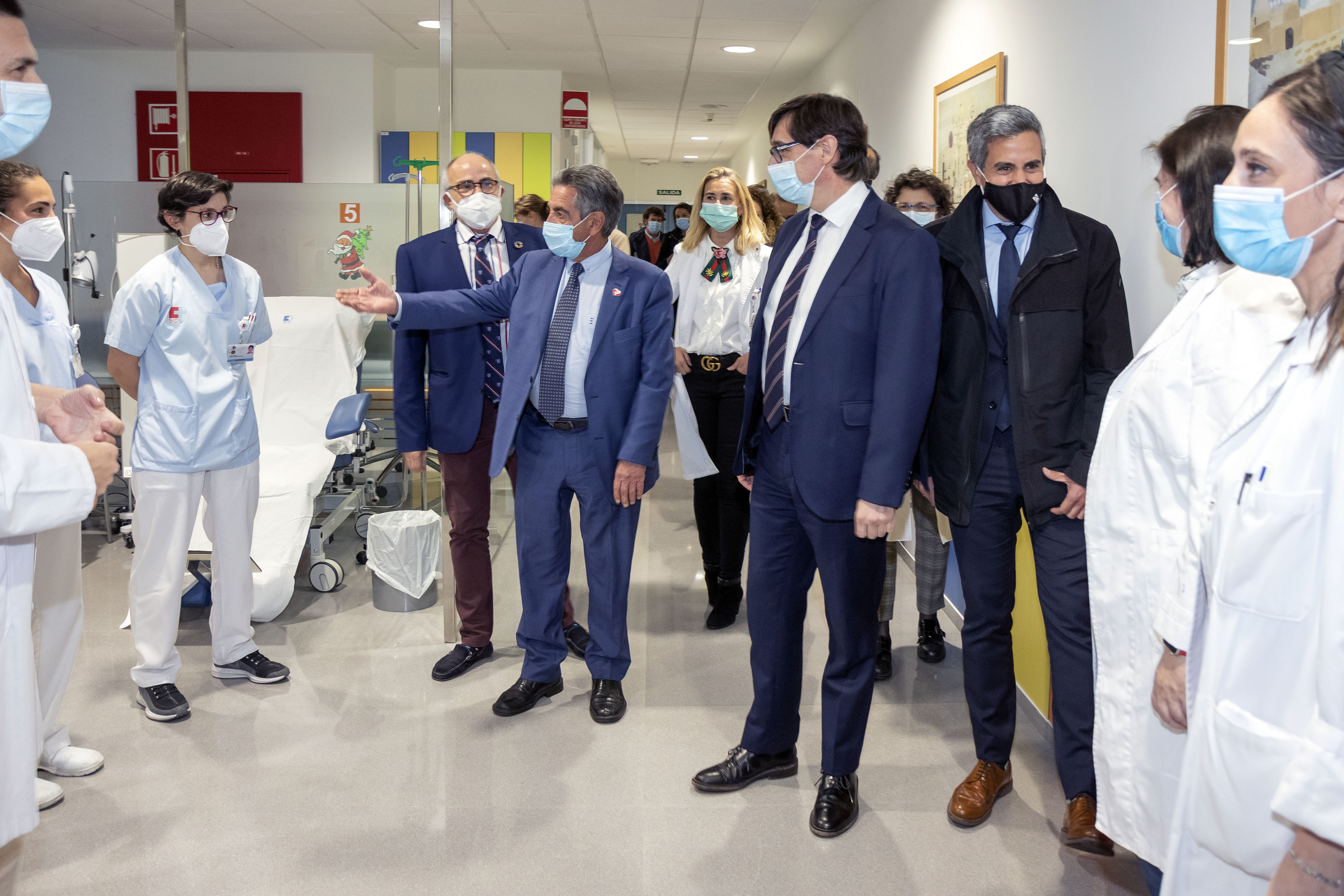
Minister Illa visiting the Valdecilla Hospital together with the president of Cantabria, Miguel Ángel Revilla, and other regional authorities.

In August, the minister carried out an important reform of the Ministry of Health, recovering the historic Secretariat of State for Health; he suppressed the General Secretariat for Health and created a new General Secretariat for Digital Health, all with the aim of improving the management of the pandemic by the Government and to achieve a more efficient and modern health system. In this sense, at the same time he announced that his department was going to develop a law to create a National Agency for Public Health. This objective was reflected in the general state budget for 2021 with an allocation of five million euros for the launch of the agency.

At the beginning of September 2020, Illa estimated that the vaccine could be ready and the vaccination campaign could begin at the end of December. Thus, in November 2020, the Minister of Health, together with the Secretary of State for Health, Silvia Calzón, presented the government's national vaccination strategy, which would begin at the end of December. On 21 December 2020, the European Medicines Agency approved the use of the first of the vaccines, the one developed by BioNTech and Pfizer. The first doses arrived in Spain and the rest of the member states of the European Union on 26 December and mass vaccination began a day later.

Illa resigned as Minister of Health in January 2021 to focus on the Catalan regional election.

== Return to regional politics ==
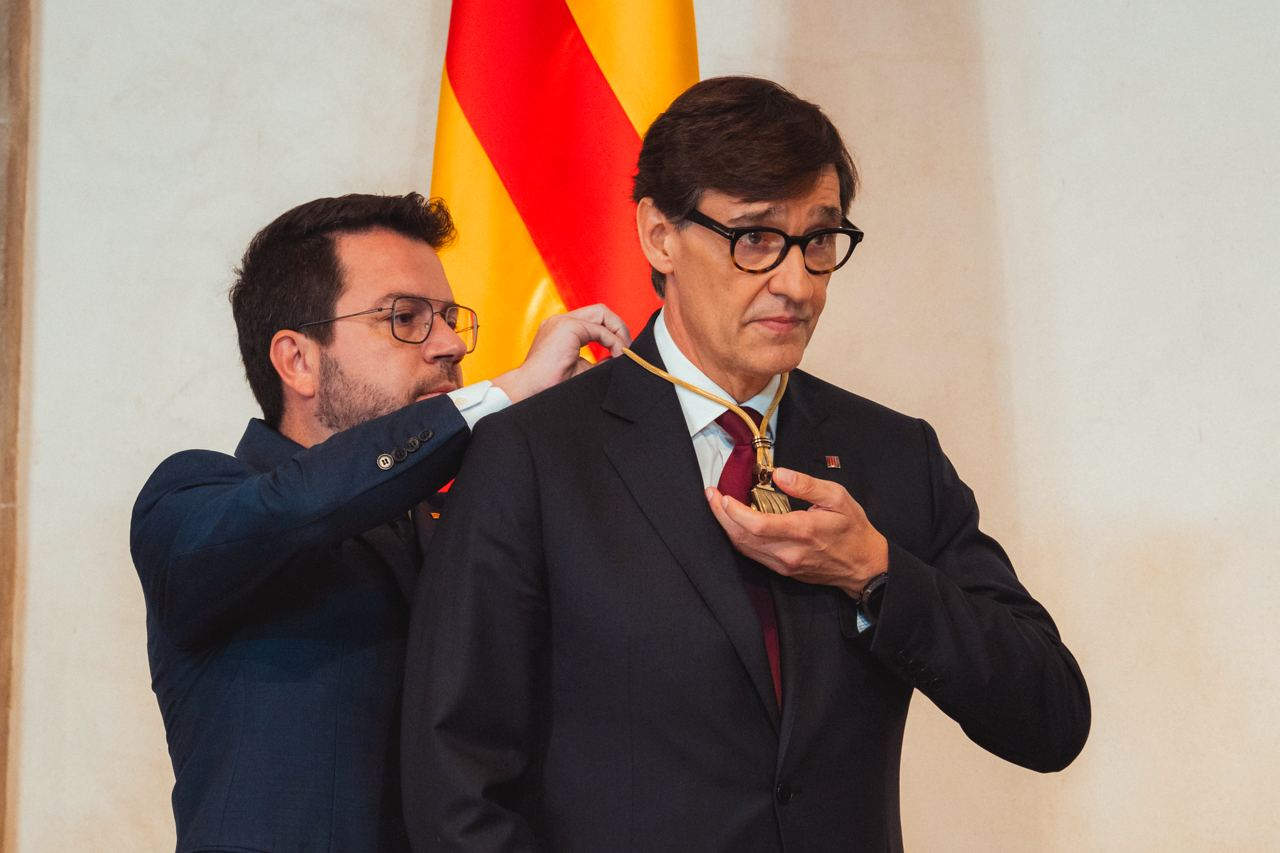
Illa being sworn in as president by Aragonès

On 30 December 2020, PSC leader Miquel Iceta announced his decision of stepping back and not to be the candidate of the party in the Catalan regional election of 14 February 2021 and announced that Illa would be the head of the candidacy. On 22 January 2021, it was announced that Illa had left the ministry to concentrate on the Catalan Elections scheduled for February 2021. He won the Catalan elections but could not form government, and stayed as head of opposition.

In March 2024, Illa was confirmed as PSC candidate at the 2024 Catalan Parliament election. Under his leadership the Socialist Party won the most seats and formed a confidence and supply agreement with ERC and Comuns Sumar allowing him to form a government composed solely of PSC and independent members. He became President of the Government of Catalonia on 10 August.

== Personal life ==
In January 2026, he was admitted to Vall d'Hebron University Hospital due to weakness and numbness in his legs caused by a osteomyelitis of the pubic symphysis. Therefore, during his illness, the duties of President of the Government of Catalonia were assumed by the Minister of the Presidency, Albert Dalmau Miranda.
