= Viviane Ogou =

Spanish politician (born 1997)

Member of the Congress of Deputies
- Incumbent
- Assumed office 10 February 2025
- Constituency: Barcelona

Personal details
- Born: 3 December 1997 (age 28) Barcelona, Spain
- Party: Sumar; Catalunya en Comú
- Education: University Pompeu Fabra
- Occupation: Politician, activist

Viviane Ogou Corbi (born 3 December 1997) is a Spanish anti-racist and left-wing activist and politician. She has been a Member of the Congress of Deputies for the Comuns, within the Plurinational Parliamentary Group Sumar, since February 2025, replacing Gala Pin.

Since 2020, she has presided over the nonpartisan association Puerta de África, which she founded herself and which aims to empower youth and promote African studies.

== Biography ==
Viviane Ogou Corbi is the daughter of a Spanish mother and an Ivorian father, Herve ŒgÚ Anuel (a distinguished law student at Pompeu Fabra University and a former student at the Autonomous University of Barcelona, with a degree in Political Science). She studied International Relations at the Rey Juan Carlos University in Madrid, where she began her involvement in anti-racist and student movements. During that period, she delved into the history and politics of West Africa, the African Union, and the conflicts in the Sahel. In the 2017–2018 academic year, after losing several family members to cancer, she moved to Barcelona to pursue a SICUE exchange program at Pompeu Fabra University, taking courses in Law, Global Studies, and Humanities.

After graduating, she returned to Barcelona to pursue a Master's in International Security at the Barcelona Institute of International Studies, specializing in peacekeeping in the Sahel. In 2022, she received the Talent Global scholarship at the Barcelona Centre for International Affairs to study anti-French sentiment in the Sahel. Although she considered pursuing a PhD after university, she ultimately chose to focus on the nonprofit and political sectors.

She has been highly active in the NGO and think tank sectors related to the United Nations, the European Union, and social entrepreneurship since her university years. In 2017, she co-founded an association for the promotion of peace and democracy in Mali, called La Llar de Sucre. In 2020, she founded "Puerta de África", and later participated in founding the Black African and Afro-descendant Community of Spain, joining the Catalonia regional section. She has also collaborated on several occasions with the public institution Casa África on activities related to migration and security in the Sahel.

In July 2023, she agreed to run on the Comuns-Sumar ticket for the Barcelona province as number 7, and in February 2025 she took office after the resignation of MP Gala Pin. Ogou is only the fourth black politician elected to congress after Rita Bosaho, Luc André Diouf and Ignacio Garriga.

== Political Activity ==
In 2017, she took part in pro-independence protests. In 2022, she agreed to coordinate the National Project on Migration for Sumar, later joining Barcelona en Comú, Catalunya en Comú, and Movimiento Sumar following the general election, under the leadership of Ada Colau and Janet Sanz; Jéssica Albiach, Candela López Tagliafico, and Gemma Tarafa Orpinell; and Yolanda Díaz and Ernest Urtasun. She is currently a member of the coordination committee of Barcelona en Comú.

In 2020 and 2021, she was appointed Spanish Youth Delegate to the Congress of Local and Regional Authorities of the Council of Europe, while also serving as the spokesperson for the Madrid chapter of the nonpartisan association Equipo Europa, which brought her visibility within the Spanish activist scene. As part of her work, she co-directed the short documentary “Empezar de Cero” about homeless strawberry harvesters in Lepe.

In 2022, she was commissioned by the Barcelona Youth Council to contribute to drafting the Pact for the Future as a Delegate in the Youth Caucus of United Cities and Local Governments.

In 2021 and 2022, she was recognized as a “Black Voice in Spain” by the Embassy of Spain in the United States. In 2021, she also won the “Messenger of Peace Hero” award from the World Organization of the Scout Movement, and in 2022 she received the “Woman of Europe” award from the European Movement and the European Women’s Lobby.

Known for her work as a researcher and educator, she has spoken in favor of welcoming migrants and refugees arriving through irregular channels in Spain and has supported the Popular Legislative Initiative for Extraordinary Regularization of undocumented migrants in Spain.

== Controversies ==
In 2023, she published a post on "X" opposing Ukraine's accession to the European Union. She stated that "it is not ready in terms of values, governance, or economy. Solidarity yes, suicide no. Thank you."

In February 2025, she publicly proposed creating a racial census and implementing racial quotas in employment in Spain, following the Anglo-Saxon model, aiming to combat inequality faced by Afro-descendants in the country. Shortly after, amid public backlash, she deleted the proposal from her social media accounts.

She is known for using passionate language in her posts, referring to “institutional racism” or asserting that “Spain is a racist country.” On social media, she has also repeatedly emphasized the need to adopt an “anti-racist and decolonial perspective.”

Viviane Ogou has described the New Pact on Migration and Asylum as "racist" on her "X" account.
