= Comarcal council =

Institution charged with local government and administration in Spain

The comarcal council (Catalan: consell comarcal, Galician: consello comarcal, Aragonese: concello comarcal, Spanish: consejo comarcal), also somewhat misleadingly referred to as county council, is a local administration and government body in the comarcas of some parts of Spain, mostly in the autonomous communities of Catalonia, Aragon and the Basque Country.

The comarcal council is normally constituted by representatives of the municipalities within the comarcal demarcation, who are elected according to law-regulated mechanisms.

== In Aragon ==
=== Membership of the councils ===
Council membership of a comarca is allocated according to its population using the following table:

Population	Council seats
Up to 10,000	19
From 10,001 to 25,000	25
From 25,001 to 50,000	35
From 50,001 onwards	39

== In the Basque Country ==
Only in the province of Álava comarcas have administrative status, known as kuadrilla in Basque and cuadrilla in Spanish. There are Añana, Ayala/Aiara, Gorbeialdea, Plain of Alava, Riojan Alava, Alava Mountains and Vitoria. Their comarcal councils bear the name kuadrillako batzarra in Basque or junta de cuadrilla in Spanish (county assembly in English).

Out of all 7 Alavan cuadrillas, only the Vitoria cuadrilla does not have any cuadrilla institutions, thus only keeping the name symbolically for the natural comarca, since all governance is assumed by the city council of the municipality of Vitoria-Gasteiz, the only municipality that makes up that cuadrilla.

== In Catalonia ==
Comarques of Catalonia

In Catalonia, the councilors of each of the comarcal councils are elected indirectly every four years from the results of the municipal elections of each of the municipalities that make up the comarca. They are elected under a mixed system of party-list proportional representation using the D'Hondt method, where both the number of votes obtained for each candidacy and the number of city councilors are taken into account.

Formally created in 1987, there are currently 41 comarcal councils in Catalonia. They establish the lowest system of government after the city council itself, with its organization comprising a collegial body, the plenary session, and a unipersonal body, the President. The plenary session is composed of councilors from each of the city councils of the municipalities that make up the comarca.

The plenary session chooses the President. They also have a manager fully integrated into the administration, akin to a city manager, who is fully dedicated to executing the tasks of the regional government and administration.

The Barcelonès comarcal council was formally abolished in 2019, rendering it the only comarca without one. Currently, due to its recent inception, it is only scheduled for the Lluçanès comarca to form its first comarcal council after the 2027 local elections.

=== Membership of the councils ===
Council membership of a comarca is allocated according to its population using the following table:

Population	Council seats
Up to 50,000	19
From 50,001 to 100,000	25
From 100,001 to 500,000	33
From 500,001 onwards	39

==== Comarcal Council of Alt Penedès ====
Councilors in the Comarcal Council of Alt Penedès since 1987
Key to parties CUP ICV–EUiA–EPM BComú–E (ENTESA) En Comú–ECG ERC AAAP PSC JxCat Junts PDeCAT CiU PP
Election	Distribution	President
1987	1 / 10 / 14	Joan Raventós Pujadó (CiU)
1991	1 / 10 / 14	Pere Parera Cartró (CiU)
1995	2 / 9 / 1 / 12 / 1	Joan Amat Solé (CiU) (1995-1997)
1995	2 / 9 / 1 / 12 / 1	Raimon Gusi Amigó (CiU) (1997-1999)
1999	2 / 10 / 1 / 11 / 1	Angèlica Rodríguez Herrera (CiU)
2003	3 / 11 / 10 / 1	Lluís Valls Comas (PSC) (2003-2005)
2003	3 / 11 / 10 / 1	Ramon Xena Pareta (ERC) (2005-2007)
2007	1 / 3 / 10 / 10 / 1	Francesc Olivella (CiU) (2007-2009)
2007	1 / 3 / 10 / 10 / 1	Jordi Girona Alaiza (PSC) (2009-2011)
2011	1 / 1 / 3 / 12 / 14 / 2	Francesc Olivella (CiU)
2015	3 / 2 / 6 / 9 / 12 / 1	Francesc Olivella (PDeCAT) (2015-2017)
2015	3 / 2 / 6 / 9 / 12 / 1	Xavier Lluch (PDeCAT) (2017-2019)
2019	3 / 1 / 10 / 7 / 12	Xavier Lluch (PDeCAT)
2023	2 / 10 / 9 / 11 / 1	Xavier Lluch (Impulsem-Junts)

==== Comarcal Council of Alt Urgell ====
Councilors in the Comarcal Council of Alt Urgell since 1987
Key to parties CUP ERC P.PIRINEU PSC JxCat Junts CiU PP AP
Election	Distribution	President
1987	3 / 4 / 11 / 1	Maria Dolors Majoral Moliné (CiU)
1991	3 / 4 / 11 / 1	Maria Dolors Majoral Moliné (CiU)
1995	1 / 3 / 3 / 11 / 1	Maria Dolors Majoral Moliné (CiU)
1999	3 / 5 / 10 / 1	Ventura Roca Martí (CiU)
2003	4 / 6 / 8 / 1	Ventura Roca Martí (CiU)
2007	3 / 6 / 9 / 1	Jesús Fierro Rugall (CiU)
2011	2 / 6 / 10 / 1	Jesús Fierro Rugall (CiU)
2015	5 / 3 / 11	Jesús Fierro Rugall (CiU)
2019	6 / 4 / 9	Miquel Sala Muntada (JxCat) (2019-2020)
2019	6 / 4 / 9	Josefina Lladós Torrent (Junts) (2020-2021)
2019	6 / 4 / 9	Martí Riera Rovira (ERC) (2021-2023)
2023	1 / 4 / 5 / 9	Josefina Lladós Torrent (Junts)

==== Comarcal Council of Alta Ribagorça ====
Councilors in the Comarcal Council of Alta Ribagorça since 1988
Key to parties En Comú–ECG ERC Diverse PSC JxCat Junts CiU PP
Election	Distribution	President
1987	8 / 2 / 9	Alejandro Rivera (PSC) (1987-1989)
1987	8 / 2 / 9	Nadal Badia (CiU) (1989-1991)
1991	8 / 2 / 9	Josefina Ribé (CiU)
1995	8 / 2 / 2 / 6 / 1	Maria Àngels Pons (CiU)
1999	1 / 5 / 2 / 10 / 1	Joan Perelada (CiU)
2003	2 / 4 / 13	Joan Perelada (CiU)
2007	1 / 9 / 1 / 8	Joan Perelada (PSC)
2011	8 / 1 / 9 / 1	José Antonio Troguet (CiU)
2015	3 / 5 / 10 / 1	Josep Lluís Farrero (CiU)
2019	3 / 3 / 2 / 11	Maria José Erta (JxCat)
2023	6 / 4 / 3 / 6	Albert Palacín (ERC)

==== Comarcal Council of Anoia ====
Councilors in the Comarcal Council of Anoia since 1987
Key to parties CUP ICV ICV–EUiA–EPM BComú–E (ENTESA) ERC AAEA AM-LVDVDM PSC JxCat Junts CiU Cs PP PxC Vox
Election	Distribution	President
1987	1 / 8 / 4 / 12	Manuel Miserachs (CiU)
1991	9 / 4 / 12	Antoni de Solà (Independent)
1995	1 / 1 / 1 / 1 / 8 / 13	Ramon Ferri (CiU)
1999	2 / 10 / 13	Ramon Ferri (CiU) (1999-2000)
1999	2 / 10 / 13	Josep Miserachs (CiU) (2000-2003)
2003	1 / 4 / 10 / 9 / 1	Joan Vich (PSC)
2007	1 / 7 / 13 / 11 / 1	Xavier Boquete (CiU) (2007-2009)
2007	1 / 7 / 13 / 11 / 1	Marc Castells (CiU) (2009-2011)
2011	1 / 7 / 9 / 13 / 2 / 1	Xavier Boquete (CiU)
2015	1 / 1 / 11 / 7 / 12 / 1	Xavier Boquete (CiU)
2019	2 / 11 / 1 / 8 / 10 / 1	Xavier Boquete (JxCat)
2023	2 / 10 / 1 / 9 / 10 / 1	Jordi Parcerisas (Junts)

==== Comarcal Council of Bages ====
Councilors in the Comarcal Council of Bages since 1987
Key to parties CUP ICV ICV–EUiA–EPM BComú–E (ENTESA) En Comú–ECG ECG–C ERC AAEB1 AAEB2 AAEB3 CIPROB GFP PSC JxCat Junts PDeCAT CiU Cs PP PxC
Election	Distribution	President
1987	8 / 3 / 3 / 19	Francesc Iglesias i Sala (CiU)
1991	10 / 1 / 4 / 18	Francesc Iglesias i Sala (CiU)
1995	1 / 3 / 3 / 10 / 15 / 1	Jaume Rabeya Casellas (CiU)
1999	1 / 2 / 5 / 11 / 14	Josep Joan Redó (ERC) (1999-2001)
1999	1 / 2 / 5 / 11 / 14	Ignasi Perramon (ERC) (2001-2003)
2003	2 / 7 / 11 / 12 / 1	Ezequiel Martínez (PSC) (2003-2005)
2003	2 / 7 / 11 / 12 / 1	Josep Balasch (CiU) (2005-2007)
2007	2 / 7 / 10 / 13 / 1	Cristòfol Gimeno (PSC) (2007-2009)
2007	2 / 7 / 10 / 13 / 1	Josep Candàliga (ERC) (2009-2011)
2011	1 / 1 / 8 / 7 / 14 / 1 / 1	Adriana Delgado (ERC) (2011-2013)
2011	1 / 1 / 8 / 7 / 14 / 1 / 1	Mercè Cardona (PSC) (2013-2015)
2015	3 / 1 / 11 / 5 / 13	Agustí Comas (ERC)
2019	3 / 1 / 13 / 6 / 9 / 1	Estefania Torrente (ERC) (2019-2021)
2019	3 / 1 / 13 / 6 / 9 / 1	Eloi Hernàndez (ERC) (2021-2023)
2023	2 / 1 / 14 / 6 / 1 / 8 / 1	Eloi Hernàndez (ERC)

==== Comarcal Council of Baix Camp ====
Councilors in the Comarcal Council of Baix Camp since 1987
Key to parties CUP ICV ICV–EUiA–EPM ERC FIC A (Ara) NMC PSC JxCat Junts PDeCAT CiU Cs PP Vox
Election	Distribution	President
1987	1 / 10 / 20 / 2	Enric Cardús i Llevat (CiU)
1991	1 / 10 / 21 / 1	Robert Ortiga (CiU)
1995	1 / 3 / 8 / 19 / 2	Robert Ortiga (CiU)
1999	4 / 8 / 1 / 18 / 2	Robert Ortiga (CiU)
2003	1 / 5 / 11 / 1 / 12 / 3	Robert Ortiga (CiU)
2007	1 / 5 / 11 / 1 / 12 / 3	Xavier Llauradó (ERC) (2007-2009)
2007	1 / 5 / 11 / 1 / 12 / 3	Josep Masdeu (PSC) (2009-2011)
2011	4 / 10 / 15 / 4	Quim Calatayud (CiU)
2015	3 / 8 / 5 / 1 / 12 / 2 / 2	Quim Calatayud (CiU)
2019	2 / 11 / 6 / 1 / 10 / 2 / 1	Quim Calatayud (JxCat) (2019-2021)
2019	2 / 11 / 6 / 1 / 10 / 2 / 1	Rosa Maria Abelló (ERC) (2021-2023)
2023	1 / 10 / 7 / 1 / 9 / 1 / 2 / 2	Ernest Roigé (ERC) (2023-2025)
2023	1 / 10 / 7 / 1 / 9 / 1 / 2 / 2	Joan Josep Garcia (Junts) (2025-2027)

==== Comarcal Council of Baix Ebre ====
Councilors in the Comarcal Council of Baix Ebre since 1987
Key to parties ICV ICV–EUiA–EPM BComú–E (ENTESA) En Comú–ECG ERC AEIA UA FIC PSC JxCat Junts CiU Cs PP
Election	Distribution	President
1987	1 / 8 / 1 / 1 / 10 / 4	Marià Curto i Forés (CiU)
1991	8 / 1 / 12 / 4	Marià Curto i Forés (CiU)
1995	1 / 5 / 1 / 1 / 12 / 5	Ramon Cardús (CiU)
1999	7 / 12 / 6	Joan Bertomeu (PP)
2003	4 / 8 / 2 / 8 / 3	Ferran Bel (CiU)
2007	6 / 8 / 10 / 1	Andreu Martí (CiU) (2007-2009)
2007	6 / 8 / 10 / 1	Dani Andreu (ERC) (2009-2011)
2011	6 / 6 / 11 / 2	Lluís Soler (CiU)
2015	1 / 8 / 5 / 10 / 1	Dani Andreu (ERC) (2015-2017)
2015	1 / 8 / 5 / 10 / 1	Enric Roig (PSC) (2017)
2015	1 / 8 / 5 / 10 / 1	Sandra Zaragoza (PDeCAT) (2017-2019)
2019	2 / 11 / 3 / 8 / 1	Xavier Faura (ERC)
2023	10 / 5 / 10	Antoni Gilabert (ERC)

==== Comarcal Council of Baix Empordà ====
Councilors in the Comarcal Council of Baix Empordà since 1987
Key to parties CUP ICV ICV–EUiA–EPM BComú–E (ENTESA) En Comú–ECG ECG–C ERC UPM TSF TE UPMcat PSC JxCat Junts CiU Cs PP
Election	Distribution	President
1987	5 / 2 / 18	Albert Vancells (CiU)
1991	7 / 1 / 17	Albert Vancells (CiU)
1995	1 / 1 / 2 / 6 / 15	Albert Vancells (CiU)
1999	1 / 1 / 1 / 6 / 16	Josep Sala (CiU)
2003	4 / 3 / 1 / 9 / 15 / 1	Ricard Herrero (PSC)
2007	3 / 6 / 12 / 1 / 10 / 1	Ricard Herrero (PSC)
2011	2 / 6 / 10 / 1 / 13 / 1	Joan Català (CiU)
2015	2 / 1 / 11 / 6 / 1 / 11 / 1	Joan Català (CiU, JxCat)
2019	2 / 1 / 12 / 1 / 5 / 4 / 7 / 1	Joan Loureiro (ERC)
2023	2 / 1 / 9 / 6 / 6 / 9	Glòria Marull (Junts) (2023-2025)
2023	2 / 1 / 9 / 6 / 6 / 9	TBD (ERC) (2025-2027)

==== Comarcal Council of Baix Llobregat ====
Councilors in the Comarcal Council of Baix Llobregat since 1987
Key to parties CUP EUiA ICV ICV–EUiA–EPM BComú–E (ENTESA) En Comú–ECG ECG–C ERC PSC JxCat Junts CDS CiU Cs PP PxC Vox
Election	Distribution	President
1987	9 / 18 / 1 / 11	José Montilla (PSC)
1991	7 / 19 / 12 / 1	José Montilla (PSC)
1995	9 / 1 / 16 / 9 / 4	José Montilla (PSC) (1995-1998)
1995	9 / 1 / 16 / 9 / 4	José Luis Morlanes (PSC) (1998-1999)
1999	1 / 7 / 1 / 19 / 8 / 3	José Luis Morlanes (PSC)
2003	8 / 4 / 17 / 6 / 4	Rosa Boladeras (PSC)
2007	7 / 4 / 17 / 6 / 1 / 4	Rosa Boladeras (PSC)
2011	8 / 2 / 14 / 8 / 6 / 1	Joaquim Balsera (PSC) (2011-2014)
2011	8 / 2 / 14 / 8 / 6 / 1	Lourdes Borrell (PSC) (acting 2014)
2011	8 / 2 / 14 / 8 / 6 / 1	Josep Perpinyà (PSC) (2014-2015)
2015	1 / 7 / 6 / 13 / 5 / 4 / 3	Josep Perpinyà (PSC)
2019	5 / 9 / 16 / 4 / 4 / 1	Eva Martínez (PSC)
2023	5 / 7 / 17 / 4 / 4 / 2	Eva Martínez (PSC)

==== Comarcal Council of Baix Penedès ====
Councilors in the Comarcal Council of Baix Penedès since 1987
Key to parties CUP ICV ICV–EUiA–EPM Si Se Puede El Vendrell / Si Es Pot El Vendrell BComú–E (ENTESA) En Comú–ECG ECG–C ERC UIBP ADMC PSC JxCat Junts PDeCAT CiU Cs PP PxC Vox
Election	Distribution	President
1987	9 / 10	Benet Jané (CiU)
1991	7 / 2 / 10	Benet Jané (CiU)
1995	1 / 6 / 11 / 1	Benet Jané (CiU)
1999	1 / 11 / 12 / 1	Benet Jané (CiU)
2003	2 / 10 / 1 / 11 / 1	Benet Jané (CiU)
2007	1 / 2 / 9 / 1 / 10 / 1 / 1	Jordi Sánchez (PSC)
2011	1 / 2 / 8 / 10 / 3 / 1	Joan Olivella (CiU)
2015	2 / 1 / 1 / 5 / 9 / 10 / 2 / 2 / 1	Eva Serramià (CiU, JxCat)
2019	1 / 1 / 7 / 12 / 8 / 3 / 1	Joan Sans (PSC)
2023	1 / 7 / 12 / 5 / 4 / 2 / 2	Ramon Ferré (PSC)

==== Comarcal Council of Barcelonès ====
Councilors in the Comarcal Council of Barcelonès between 1987 and 2019
Key to parties CUP ICV ICV–EUiA–EPM BComú–E (ENTESA) ERC PSC CiU Cs PP AP
Election	Distribution	President
1987	7 / 22 / 9 / 1	Joan Blanch (PSC)
1991	6 / 21 / 10 / 2	Joan Blanch (PSC)
1995	6 / 1 / 17 / 9 / 6	Joan Blanch (PSC)
1999	2 / 1 / 23 / 7 / 6	Maite Arqué (PSC)
2003	5 / 3 / 18 / 7 / 6	Joan Carles Mas (PSC)
2007	4 / 2 / 17 / 9 / 7	Joan Carles Mas (PSC)
2011	5 / 1 / 14 / 10 / 9	Jesús María Canga (PSC) (2011-2013)
2011	5 / 1 / 14 / 10 / 9	Francesc Josep Belver (PSC) (2013-2015)
2015	4 / 8 / 4 / 8 / 6 / 4 / 5	Francesc Josep Belver (PSC)
Council approved self-dissolution in 2017, formally abolished since 2019. Superseded by the Metropolitan Council of the Barcelona Metropolitan Area (AMB).

==== Comarcal Council of Berguedà ====
Councilors in the Comarcal Council of Berguedà since 1987
Key to parties CUP ICV ICV–EUiA–EPM ERC AAEB PB PSC JxCat Junts CiU PP
Election	Distribution	President
1987	4 / 3 / 12	Jaume Farguell i Sitges (CiU)
1991	4 / 3 / 12	Jaume Farguell i Sitges (CiU)
1995	1 / 2 / 1 / 3 / 12	Jaume Farguell i Sitges (CiU)
1999	2 / 5 / 11 / 1	Montserrat Ribera (CiU)
2003	3 / 6 / 10	Montserrat Ribera (CiU)
2007	1 / 2 / 6 / 10	Montserrat Ribera (CiU) (2007-2008)
2007	1 / 2 / 6 / 10	Sergi Roca (CiU) (2008-2011)
2011	1 / 2 / 5 / 11	Sergi Roca (CiU)
2015	2 / 6 / 2 / 9	David Font (CiU, JxCat) (2015-2018)
2015	2 / 6 / 2 / 9	Josep Lara (JxCat) (2018-2019)
2019	3 / 6 / 2 / 1 / 7	Josep Lara (JxCat, Junts)
2023	3 / 6 / 1 / 2 / 2 / 5	Ramon Caballé (Junts) (2023-2025)
2023	3 / 6 / 1 / 2 / 2 / 5	Moisès Masanas (ERC) (2025-2027)

==== Comarcal Council of Cerdanya ====
Councilors in the Comarcal Council of (Baixa) Cerdanya since 1987
Key to parties ICV–EUiA–EPM ERC P.PIRINEU Agrupació En-Cerd FLL PSC FTR JxCat Junts CiU
Election	Distribution	President
1987	1 / 2 / 15 / 1	Josep Tajà (CiU)
1991	2 / 2 / 2 / 13	Josep Tajà (CiU)
1995	2 / 3 / 2 / 12	Joan Pous (CiU)
1999	5 / 3 / 1 / 10	Pere Moya (CiU) (1999-2001)
1999	5 / 3 / 1 / 10	Joan Pous (CiU) (2001-2003)
2003	1 / 7 / 1 / 10	Joan Pous (CiU)
2007	8 / 2 / 9	Joan Pous (CiU) (2007-2009)
2007	8 / 2 / 9	Esteve Maurell (PSC) (2009-2011)
2011	1 / 4 / 2 / 12	Ramon Moliner (CiU)
2015	3 / 3 / 13	Ramon Moliner (CiU)
2019	7 / 3 / 9	Roser Bombardó (ERC)
2023	8 / 1 / 1 / 9	Isidre Chia (Junts)

==== Comarcal Council of Conca de Barberà ====
Councilors in the Comarcal Council of Conca de Barberà since 1987
Key to parties ICV ICV–EUiA–EPM ERC Independents per Montblanc Solivella Unida Unió Independents - Conca de Barberà Junts per Vimbodí FIC PSC JxCat Junts PDeCAT CiU PP
Election	Distribution	President
1987	3 / 1 / 2 / 13	Antoni Llort Güell (CiU)
1991	8 / 1 / 9 / 1	Eloi Pros (PP) (1991-1993)
1991	8 / 1 / 9 / 1	Antoni Llort (CiU) (1993-1995)
1995	1 / 1 / 6 / 11	Josep Maria Riba (CiU)
1999	1 / 2 / 1 / 3 / 11 / 1	Josep Maria Riba (CiU)
2003	4 / 3 / 1 / 2 / 9	Josep Maria Riba (CiU) (2003-2005)
2003	4 / 3 / 1 / 2 / 9	David Rovira (CiU) (2005-2007)
2007	4 / 4 / 3 / 8	David Rovira (CiU)
2011	1 / 5 / 2 / 2 / 9	Ramon Borràs (CiU) (2011-2014)
2011	1 / 5 / 2 / 2 / 9	Josep Amill (CiU) (2014-2015)
2015	7 / 1 / 3 / 8	Josep Pijoan (FIC) (2015-2017)
2015	7 / 1 / 3 / 8	Francesc Benet (ERC) (2017-2019)
2019	8 / 1 / 2 / 8	Magí Trullols (FIC) (2019-2021)
2019	8 / 1 / 2 / 8	Carme Pallàs (ERC) (2021-2023)
2023	7 / 1 / 2 / 8 / 1	Joan Canela (Junts)

==== Comarcal Council of Garraf ====
Councilors in the Comarcal Council of Garraf since 1987
Key to parties CUP ICV ICV–EUiA–EPM BComú–E (ENTESA) En Comú–ECG ECG–C ERC AAEG Entesa per Cubelles TRANSFORMEM-VNG PSC FIC JxCat Junts CDS CiU Cs PP Vox
Election	Distribution	President
1987	1 / 11 / 2 / 2 / 1 / 8	Jaume Casanovas (PSC)
1991	2 / 2 / 4 / 10 / 7	Francesc Xavier Robert (PSC)
1995	2 / 9 / 7 / 3	Víctor Forgas (PSC)
1999	5 / 1 / 10 / 7 / 2	Joaquim Mas (ICV)
2003	3 / 2 / 14 / 1 / 1 / 8 / 4	Josep Antoni Blanco (PSC)
2007	4 / 2 / 14 / 1 / 9 / 3	Josep Antoni Blanco (PSC)
2011	3 / 4 / 11 / 10 / 5	Juan Luis Ruiz (PSC)
2015	5 / 1 / 5 / 8 / 1 / 9 / 2 / 2	Gerard Martí Figueras (CiU) (2015-2016)
2015	5 / 1 / 5 / 8 / 1 / 9 / 2 / 2	Glòria Garcia (JxCat) (2016-2019)
2019	3 / 1 / 1 / 7 / 11 / 1 / 6 / 3	Abigail Garrido (PSC)
2023	2 / 2 / 3 / 13 / 1 / 8 / 2 / 2	Mònica Gallardo (Junts) (2023-2024)
2023	2 / 2 / 3 / 13 / 1 / 8 / 2 / 2	TBD (PSC) (2024-2027)

==== Comarcal Council of Garrigues ====
Councilors in the Comarcal Council of Garrigues since 1988
Key to parties ERC Xtu Borges Per La República-Xtu PSC JxCat Junts CiU PP
Election	Distribution	President
1987	1 / 5 / 13	Josep Domènech (CiU)
1991	1 / 4 / 14	Francesc Piñol (CiU)
1995	3 / 2 / 13 / 1	Francesc Piñol (CiU)
1999	5 / 1 / 12 / 1	Francesc Piñol (CiU)
2003	5 / 4 / 10	Juli Muro (CiU)
2007	6 / 4 / 9	Josep Lluís Balsells (CiU)
2011	5 / 4 / 10	Juli Muro (CiU)
2015	7 / 1 / 11	Antoni Villas (CiU)
2019	8 / 1 / 10	Jaume Setó (JxCat)
2023	1 / 1 / 7 / 1 / 9	Antoni Villas (Junts)

==== Comarcal Council of Garrotxa ====
Councilors in the Comarcal Council of Garrotxa since 1987
Key to parties CUP ICV ICV–EUiA–EPM ERC Unió Independent per Besalú AAEG AEIG Independents per Argelaguer PSC ELPH JxCat Junts Convergència de Begudà, la Canya i Sant Joan CiU
Election	Distribution	President
1987	3 / 3 / 13	Isabel Brussosa (CiU)
1991	1 / 2 / 2 / 14	Isabel Brussosa (CiU)
1995	1 / 4 / 1 / 13	Isabel Brussosa (CiU)
1999	1 / 4 / 14	Miquel Noguer (CiU)
2003	1 / 2 / 6 / 10	Miquel Noguer (CiU) (2003-2006)
2003	1 / 2 / 6 / 10	Joan Espona (CiU) (2006-2007)
2007	1 / 4 / 8 / 12	Joan Espona (CiU)
2011	3 / 5 / 17	Joan Espona (CiU)
2015	2 / 7 / 2 / 14	Joan Espona (CiU)
2019	1 / 9 / 1 / 14	Santi Reixach (JxCat, Junts)
2023	2 / 8 / 2 / 1 / 12	Santi Reixach (JxCat, Junts)

==== Comarcal Council of Gironès ====
Councilors in the Comarcal Council of Gironès since 1988
Key to parties CUP ICV ICV–EUiA–EPM BComú–E (ENTESA) ERC PSC AAE JxCat Junts CiU Cs PP Vox
Election	Distribution	President
1987	11 / 22	Manel Nonó (CiU)
1991	1 / 10 / 21 / 1	Josep Maria Dausà (CiU)
1995	1 / 3 / 9 / 19 / 1	Josep Maria Dausà (CiU)
1999	3 / 9 / 2 / 18 / 1	Gabriel Casas (CiU)
2003	1 / 6 / 10 / 2 / 13 / 1	Gabriel Casas (CiU)
2007	2 / 7 / 10 / 13 / 1	Lluís Freixas (CiU) (2007-2009)
2007	2 / 7 / 10 / 13 / 1	Cristina Alsina (ERC) (2009-2011)
2011	2 / 1 / 6 / 6 / 16 / 2	Jaume Busquets (CiU)
2015	4 / 1 / 9 / 3 / 14 / 1 / 1	Jaume Busquets (CiU)
2019	5 / 11 / 4 / 12 / 1	Joaquim Roca (JxCat, Junts)
2023	6 / 10 / 5 / 11 / 1	Sònia Gràcia (Junts)

==== Comarcal Council of Lluçanès ====
TBD

==== Comarcal Council of Maresme ====
Councilors in the Comarcal Council of Maresme since 1987
Key to parties CUP ICV ICV–EUiA–EPM BComú–E (ENTESA) En Comú–ECG ECG–C ERC AAEM PSC JxCat Junts PDeCAT CiU Cs PP PxC Vox
Election	Distribution	President
1987	1 / 11 / 3 / 17 / 1	Ramon Camp (CiU)
1991	1 / 1 / 2 / 11 / 16 / 2	Ramon Camp (CiU)
1991	1 / 1 / 2 / 11 / 16 / 2	Joaquim Rey (CiU)
1995	2 / 3 / 9 / 15 / 4	Joaquim Rey (CiU)
1999	2 / 3 / 12 / 12 / 4	Josep Jo (PSC)
2003	3 / 5 / 10 / 11 / 4	Manuel Mas (PSC) (2003-2004)
2003	3 / 5 / 10 / 11 / 4	Pere Almera (PSC) (2004-2007)
2007	3 / 5 / 11 / 11 / 3	Josep Jo (PSC)
2011	1 / 3 / 4 / 9 / 12 / 4 / 1	Miquel Àngel Martínez (CiU)
2015	3 / 2 / 9 / 6 / 9 / 2 / 2	Miquel Àngel Martínez (PDeCAT) (2015-2018)
2015	3 / 2 / 9 / 6 / 9 / 2 / 2	Josep Triadó (JxCat) (2018-2019)
2019	2 / 2 / 12 / 8 / 6 / 2 / 1	Damià del Clot (ERC)
2023	1 / 2 / 8 / 9 / 9 / 1 / 2 / 1	Francesc Alemany (ERC)

==== Comarcal Council of Moianès ====
Councilors in the Comarcal Council of Moianès since 2015
Key to parties CUP ERC CeP PSC JxCat Junts CiU
Election	Distribution	President
2015	10 / 1 / 2 / 6	Dionís Guiteras (ERC)
2019	2 / 7 / 2 / 1 / 7	Ramon Vilar Camprubí (ERC)
2023	10 / 1 / 1 / 7	Laia Bonells Oliver (Ara Moià–ERC)

==== Comarcal Council of Montsià ====
Councilors in the Comarcal Council of Montsià since 1987
Key to parties ICV ICV–EUiA–EPM BComú–E (ENTESA) En Comú–ECG ECG–C ERC AAEM FIC PSC JxCat Junts PDeCAT CiU PP AP
Election	Distribution	President
1987	3 / 9 / 11 / 2	Joan Maria Roig (CiU)
1991	3 / 3 / 8 / 9 / 2	Joan Maria Roig (CiU)
1995	2 / 1 / 7 / 3 / 9 / 3	Daniel Rius (CiU)
1999	2 / 1 / 8 / 2 / 10 / 2	Daniel Rius (CiU)
2003	4 / 9 / 1 / 9 / 2	Miquel Alonso (PSC) (2003-2005)
2003	4 / 9 / 1 / 9 / 2	Alfons Montserrat (ERC) (2005-2007)
2007	1 / 5 / 8 / 9 / 2	Alfons Montserrat (ERC) (2007-2009)
2007	1 / 5 / 8 / 9 / 2	Joan Castor Gonell (PSC) (2009-2011)
2011	1 / 5 / 6 / 10 / 3	Joan Manuel Martín (CiU)
2015	1 / 9 / 5 / 9 / 1	Carme Navarro (ERC) (2015-2017)
2015	1 / 9 / 5 / 9 / 1	Francesc Miró (PSC) (2017)
2015	1 / 9 / 5 / 9 / 1	Carme Navarro (ERC) (2017-2019)
2019	2 / 13 / 5 / 5	Joan Roig (ERC)
2023	1 / 10 / 6 / 7 / 1	Sergi Guimerà (PSC)

==== Comarcal Council of Noguera ====
Councilors in the Comarcal Council of Noguera since 1987
Key to parties ERC AIPN PSC JxCat Junts PDeCAT CiU PP AP
Election	Distribution	President
1987	3 / 4 / 11 / 1	Josep Borràs (CiU)
1991	1 / 1 / 4 / 12 / 1	Marcel·lí Guillaumet (CiU) (1991-1993)
1991	1 / 1 / 4 / 12 / 1	Josep Roig (CiU) (1993-1995)
1995	2 / 1 / 3 / 11 / 2	Josep Borràs (CiU)
1999	2 / 1 / 3 / 11 / 2	Marcel·lí Guillaumet (CiU)
2003	4 / 4 / 10 / 1	Josep Roig (CiU)
2007	5 / 5 / 9	Vicent Font (ERC)
2011	5 / 4 / 10	Pere Prat (CiU) (2011-2014)
2011	5 / 4 / 10	Concepció Cañadell (CiU) (2014-2015)
2015	9 / 1 / 9	Concepció Cañadell (CiU, JxCat)
2019	10 / 1 / 8	Miquel Plensa (ERC)
2023	9 / 2 / 7 / 1	Miquel Plensa (ERC)

==== Comarcal Council of Osona ====
Councilors in the Comarcal Council of Osona since 1987
Key to parties CUP ICV ICV–EUiA–EPM ERC PMO AAE7 AAEO AAE1OSONA PSC JxCat Junts PDeCAT CiU PxC
Election	Distribution	President
1987	2 / 5 / 3 / 23	Joan Usart i Barreda (CiU)
1991	3 / 6 / 2 / 2 / 20	Jacint Codina (CiU)
1995	4 / 4 / 3 / 1 / 3 / 18	Ramon Vall (CiU)
1999	1 / 5 / 5 / 3 / 19	Ramon Vall (CiU) (1999-2001)
1999	1 / 5 / 5 / 3 / 19	Enric Castellnou (CiU) (2001-2003)
2003	1 / 8 / 7 / 2 / 15	Jaume Mas (ERC)
2007	2 / 8 / 7 / 2 / 13 / 1	Miquel Arisa (PSC)
2011	1 / 1 / 8 / 5 / 2 / 14 / 2	Joan Roca (CiU)
2015	2 / 12 / 3 / 3 / 13	Joan Roca (CiU)
2019	2 / 14 / 3 / 4 / 10	Joan Carles Rodríguez (ERC)
2023	2 / 11 / 3 / 4 / 11 / 2	Gerard Sancho (Junts)

==== Comarcal Council of Pallars Jussà ====
Councilors in the Comarcal Council of Pallars Jussà since 1988
Key to parties ERC Independents, Progressives and Nationalists AEICD PSC JxCat Junts CiU PP
Election	Distribution	President
1987	4 / 2 / 1 / 12	Josep Soldevila i Tartera (CiU)
1991	5 / 13 / 1	Josep Soldevila i Tartera (CiU)
1995	6 / 13	Josep Soldevila i Tartera (CiU)
1999	1 / 4 / 1 / 13	Agustí Graell (CiU)
2003	3 / 6 / 10	Xavier Pont (CiU)
2007	4 / 8 / 7	Xavier Pont (CiU)
2011	3 / 8 / 8	Joan Ubach (CiU)
2015	5 / 5 / 9	Constante Aranda (CiU, JxCat)
2019	8 / 5 / 6	Josep Maria Mullol (JxCat, Junts)
2023	8 / 5 / 6	Ramon Jordana (ERC)

==== Comarcal Council of Pallars Sobirà ====
Councilors in the Comarcal Council of Pallars Sobirà since 1987
Key to parties CUP ICV–EUiA–EPM AIPN AAEBPF AAE1PALLARSSOBIRA FM GENT DE POBLE PSC CDS JxCat Junts CiU PP
Election	Distribution	President
1987	2 / 7 / 1 / 9	Joan Civat i Diu (CiU)
1991	6 / 2 / 1 / 10	Agustí Lluís López (CiU)
1995	6 / 13	Agustí Lluís López (CiU)
1999	8 / 10 / 1	Agustí Lluís López (CiU) (1999-2000)
1999	8 / 10 / 1	Carles Isús (CiU) (2000-2003)
2003	7 / 11 / 1	Àngel Guiu (CiU)
2007	1 / 2 / 7 / 1 / 8	Vicenç Mitjana (PSC) (2007-2009)
2007	1 / 2 / 7 / 1 / 8	Xavier Ribera (PSC) (2009-2011)
2011	2 / 5 / 12	Llàtzer Sibís (CiU)
2015	1 / 4 / 1 / 3 / 10	Llàtzer Sibís (CiU) (2015-2016)
2015	1 / 4 / 1 / 3 / 10	Carles Isús (CiU) (2016-2019)
2019	9 / 2 / 8	Gerard Sabarich (JxCat) (2019)
2019	9 / 2 / 8	Carles Isús (Independent) (2019-2023)
2023	12 / 1 / 1 / 1 / 4	Carles Isús (Independent)

==== Comarcal Council of Pla d'Urgell ====
Councilors in the Comarcal Council of Pla d'Urgell since 1988
Key to parties ERC AIPN Independents Bell-lloc d'Urgell PSC JxCat Junts PDeCAT CiU
Election	Distribution	President
1987	2 / 1 / 5 / 10 / 1	Ramon Pallàs i Soberà (CiU)
1991	3 / 3 / 12 / 1	Ramon Pallàs i Soberà (CiU)
1995	1 / 1 / 2 / 14 / 1	Joan Reñé (CiU)
1999	4 / 3 / 12	Ramon Maria Guiu (CiU)
2003	3 / 5 / 11	Joan Reñé (CiU)
2007	5 / 4 / 10	Joan Reñé (CiU)
2011	3 / 3 / 13	Francesc Fabregat (CiU)
2015	7 / 12	Josep Maria Huguet (CiU, JxCat) (2015-2017)
2015	7 / 12	Joan Trull (JxCat) (2017-2019)
2019	9 / 10	Rafel Panadés (JxCat, Junts)
2023	10 / 1 / 7 / 1	Carles Palau (ERC)

==== Comarcal Council of Pla de l'Estany ====
Councilors in the Comarcal Council of Pla de l'Estany since 1988
Key to parties CUP ERC PP-CG IDP AAPE PSC JxCat Junts CMC CiU
Election	Distribution	President
1987	4 / 15	Anton Prat Daranas (CiU)
1991	3 / 16	Pere Hernández (CiU) (1991-1993)
1991	3 / 16	Joaquim Mercader (CiU) (1993-1995)
1995	2 / 3 / 1 / 13	Pere Lladó (CiU) (1995-1996)
1995	2 / 3 / 1 / 13	Lluís Ferrando (CiU) (1996-1999)
1999	5 / 1 / 1 / 1 / 1 / 10	Josep Vicenç (CiU) (1999-2003)
1999	5 / 1 / 1 / 1 / 1 / 10	Joan Casas (CiU) (2003)
2003	6 / 3 / 2 / 8	Jordi Xargay (CiU)
2007	9 / 1 / 9	Jordi Xargay (CiU)
2011	8 / 1 / 10	Jordi Xargay (CiU)
2015	1 / 8 / 10	Jordi Xargay (CiU, JxCat)
2019	1 / 9 / 9	Francesc Castañer (ERC)
2023	1 / 9 / 9	Francesc Castañer (ERC)

==== Comarcal Council of Priorat ====
Councilors in the Comarcal Council of Priorat since 1987
Key to parties CUP ERC AAE1PRIORAT AEA PSC FIC JxCat Junts CiU
Election	Distribution	President
1987	1 / 4 / 5 / 9	Josep Maria Buil Estaún (CiU)
1991	3 / 5 / 11	
1995	4 / 3 / 3 / 9	
1999	5 / 3 / 11	Miquel Gomis (CiU) (1999-2001)
1999	5 / 3 / 11	Jordi Argilés (CiU) (2001-2003)
2003	7 / 3 / 9	Agustí Masip (ERC) (2003-2005)
2003	7 / 3 / 9	Maria Secall (CiU) (2005-2007)
2007	8 / 4 / 7	Josep Antoni Robles (CiU)
2011	5 / 4 / 1 / 9	Cèsar López (FIC) (2011-2013)
2011	5 / 4 / 1 / 9	Joan Carles Garcia (PSC) (2013-2015)
2015	1 / 8 / 1 / 9	Joan Carles Garcia (CiU, JxCat) (2015-2017)
2015	1 / 8 / 1 / 9	Jordi Sabaté (ERC) (2017-2019)
2019	1 / 10 / 1 / 7	Xavier Gràcia (ERC)
2023	1 / 13 / 5	Sergi Méndez (ERC)

==== Comarcal Council of Ribera d'Ebre ====
Councilors in the Comarcal Council of Ribera d'Ebre since 1987
Key to parties UPM ICV Catalan Left ERC AAE1RIBERAEBRE AEA Xtu PSC FIC JxCat Junts CiU PP
Election	Distribution	President
1987	1 / 3 / 5 / 9 / 1	Santiago Campos (CiU)
1991	1 / 3 / 1 / 4 / 8 / 2	Santiago Campos (CiU)
1995	1 / 1 / 4 / 3 / 9 / 1	Santiago Campos (CiU)
1999	1 / 4 / 2 / 12	Santiago Campos (CiU)
2003	5 / 5 / 9	Pere Muñoz (ERC) (2003-2005)
2003	5 / 5 / 9	Josep Solé (PSC) (2005-2007)
2007	4 / 6 / 1 / 8	Josep Solé (PSC) (2007-2009)
2007	4 / 6 / 1 / 8	Bernat Pellisa (ERC) (2009-2011)
2011	4 / 5 / 10	Jordi Jardí (CiU)
2015	8 / 1 / 1 / 9	Gemma Carim (CiU, ERC)
2019	10 / 1 / 2 / 1 / 5	Gemma Carim (CiU, ERC)
2023	9 / 2 / 1 / 7	Francesc Barbero (ERC)

==== Comarcal Council of Ripollès ====
Councilors in the Comarcal Council of Ripollès since 1987
Key to parties CUP ICV ICV–EUiA–EPM ERC UPM EIA IDC ME–UPMcat PSC JxCat Junts CiU AC
Election	Distribution	President
1987	1 / 3 / 2 / 13	Eudald Casadesús i Barceló (CiU)
1991	5 / 14	Eudald Casadesús i Barceló (CiU)
1995	1 / 1 / 5 / 12	Domènec Pairó (CiU) (1995-1997)
1995	1 / 1 / 5 / 12	Miquel Rovira (CiU) (1997-1999)
1999	2 / 3 / 1 / 13	Miquel Rovira (CiU)
2003	1 / 5 / 4 / 9	Fina del Pozo (PSC) (2003-2005)
2003	1 / 5 / 4 / 9	Miquel Sitjar (ERC) (2005-2007)
2007	1 / 5 / 5 / 8	Enric Pérez (PSC)
2011	4 / 5 / 10	Miquel Rovira (CiU)
2015	1 / 5 / 2 / 1 / 10	Joan Manso (CiU) (2015-2018)
2015	1 / 5 / 2 / 1 / 10	Eudald Picas (JxCat) (2018-2019)
2019	1 / 8 / 1 / 2 / 7	Joaquim Colomer (Junts, Independent)
2023	1 / 6 / 3 / 1 / 1 / 5 / 2	Amadeu Rosell (ERC)

==== Comarcal Council of Segarra ====
Councilors in the Comarcal Council of Segarra since 1987
Key to parties CUP BComú–E (ENTESA) ERC AIPN INSE PSC FIC JxCat Junts CiU PP PxC
Election	Distribution	President
1987	1 / 18	Joan Salat i Tarrats (CiU)
1991	2 / 16 / 1	Joan Salat i Tarrats (CiU)
1995	1 / 1 / 1 / 14 / 2	Francesc Buireu (CiU)
1999	2 / 2 / 2 / 11 / 2	Francesc Buireu (CiU)
2003	5 / 1 / 2 / 10 / 1	Francesc Buireu (CiU) (2003)
2003	5 / 1 / 2 / 10 / 1	Salvador Bordes (CiU) (2003-2004)
2003	5 / 1 / 2 / 10 / 1	Adrià Marquilles (CiU) (2004-2007)
2007	7 / 1 / 2 / 8 / 1	Xavier Casoliva (ERC)
2011	6 / 2 / 10 / 1	Adrià Marquilles (CiU)
2015	1 / 1 / 7 / 1 / 1 / 8	Xavier Casoliva (ERC)
2019	1 / 9 / 1 / 8	Francesc Lluch (ERC)
2023	7 / 1 / 3 / 8	Ramon Augé (Junts)

==== Comarcal Council of Segrià ====
Councilors in the Comarcal Council of Segrià since 1987
Key to parties CUP ICV ICV–EUiA–EPM BComú–E (ENTESA) En Comú–ECG ECG–C ERC Comú de Lleida PSC JxCat Junts PDeCAT CiU Cs PP Vox
Election	Distribution	President
1987	13 / 18 / 2	Manel Oronich (CiU) (1987-1989)
1987	13 / 18 / 2	Jordi Marimon (CiU) (1989-1991)
1991	15 / 16 / 2	
1995	2 / 11 / 17 / 3	
1999	2 / 12 / 16 / 3	Francesc Teixidó (CiU)
2003	1 / 5 / 11 / 13 / 3	Gonçal Serrate (CiU)
2007	1 / 5 / 14 / 11 / 2	Ricard Pons (PSC)
2011	1 / 3 / 13 / 12 / 4	Pau Cabré (CiU)
2015	1 / 1 / 7 / 6 / 1 / 13 / 2 / 2	María José Invernón (CiU, JxCat)
2019	1 / 10 / 6 / 13 / 2 / 1	David Masot (JxCat)
2023	1 / 1 / 9 / 7 / 10 / 1 / 3 / 1	David Masot (Impulsem Lleida–Junts)

==== Comarcal Council of Selva ====
Councilors in the Comarcal Council of Selva since 1987
Key to parties CUP ICV ICV–EUiA–EPM BComú–E (ENTESA) En Comú–ECG ECG–C ERC UMS AAEIS AAE1SELVA1 AAE1SELVA2 MILLOR IdSELVA PSC FIC JxCat Junts PDeCAT CiU Cs PP
Election	Distribution	President
1987	1 / 6 / 18	Josep Maria Puig i Vendrell (CiU) (1988-1990)
1987	1 / 6 / 18	Josep Micaló (CiU) (1990-1991)
1991	1 / 2 / 4 / 8 / 18	Josep Micaló (CiU)
1995	3 / 1 / 4 / 6 / 19	Carme Benages (CiU)
1999	4 / 3 / 8 / 1 / 16 / 1	Joan Puig (ERC)
2003	2 / 6 / 2 / 8 / 14 / 1	Jordi Iglesias (CiU)
2007	3 / 6 / 2 / 7 / 14 / 1	Robert Fauria (CiU) (2007-2009)
2007	3 / 6 / 2 / 7 / 14 / 1	Jordi Gironès (PSC) (2009-2011)
2011	2 / 6 / 7 / 1 / 3 / 12 / 2	Robert Fauria (CiU) (2011-2013)
2011	2 / 6 / 7 / 1 / 3 / 12 / 2	Salvador Balliu (CiU) (2013-2015)
2015	1 / 2 / 8 / 5 / 3 / 12 / 1 / 1	Salvador Balliu (CiU, JxCat)
2019	1 / 2 / 10 / 5 / 4 / 10 / 1	Salvador Balliu (JxCat, Junts)
2023	1 / 1 / 9 / 5 / 4 / 12 / 1	Martí Pujals (Junts)

==== Comarcal Council of Solsonès ====
Councilors in the Comarcal Council of Solsonès since 1987
Key to parties CUP ERC UMS ISLL COMU AAE1SOLSONES PSC FIC JxCat Junts PDeCAT CiU PP AP
Election	Distribution	President
1987	1 / 16 / 2	Ramon Llumà Guitart (CiU)
1991	2 / 15 / 2	Ramon Llumà Guitart (CiU) (1991-1992)
1991	2 / 15 / 2	Francesc Xavier Ballabriga (CiU) (1993-1995)
1995	18 / 1	Francesc Xavier Ballabriga (CiU)
1999	1 / 1 / 3 / 13 / 1	Joan Serra (CiU)
2003	3 / 5 / 11	Joan Serra (CiU)
2007	4 / 2 / 2 / 11	Marià Chaure (CiU)
2011	8 / 1 / 10	Joan Solà (CiU)
2015	1 / 8 / 2 / 8	Sara Alarcón (ERC)
2019	1 / 9 / 2 / 7	Sara Alarcón (ERC)
2023	1 / 7 / 8 / 3	Benjamí Puig (ERC) (2023-2025)
2023	1 / 7 / 8 / 3	Claustre Sunyer (Junts) (2025-2027)

==== Comarcal Council of Tarragonès ====
Councilors in the Comarcal Council of Tarragonès since 1987
Key to parties CUP ICV ICV–EUiA–EPM BComú–E (ENTESA) En Comú–ECG ECG–C ERC AAEG Entesa per Cubelles PSC FIC JxCat Junts CDS CiU Cs PP AP Vox
Election	Distribution	President
1987	10 / 1 / 20 / 2	Joan Miquel Nadal i Malé (CiU)
1991	1 / 9 / 21 / 2	Joan Carrera (CiU)
1995	2 / 2 / 7 / 19 / 3	Montserrat Güell i Anglès (CiU)
1999	1 / 2 / 8 / 18 / 4	Carles Sala (CiU)
2003	2 / 3 / 10 / 14 / 4	Carles Sala (CiU)
2007	2 / 3 / 12 / 12 / 4	Eudald Roca (ERC)
2011	2 / 2 / 11 / 13 / 5	Frederic Adan (CiU)
2015	1 / 2 / 5 / 9 / 9 / 4 / 3	Pere Virgili (CiU) (2015-2017)
2015	1 / 2 / 5 / 9 / 9 / 4 / 3	Daniel Cid (PSC) (2017-2019)
2019	1 / 2 / 9 / 9 / 7 / 4 / 1	Joan Martí (JxCat) (2019-2021)
2019	1 / 2 / 9 / 9 / 7 / 4 / 1	Óscar Sánchez (PSC) (2021-2023)
2023	1 / 2 / 8 / 11 / 6 / 3 / 2	Salvador Ferré (PSC) (2023-2025)
2023	1 / 2 / 8 / 11 / 6 / 3 / 2	Joan Martí (Junts) (2025-2027)

==== Comarcal Council of Terra Alta ====
Councilors in the Comarcal Council of Terra Alta since 1987
Key to parties BComú–E (ENTESA) En Comú–ECG (ENTESA) ECG–C (Movem Terres de l'Ebre) ERC AAEETERRAAL UPTA 100%xB UPTA–PSC PSC FIC JxCat Junts CiU PP AP
Election	Distribution	President
1987	2 / 2 / 10 / 5	Francesc Bové i Tarragó (CiU)
1991	2 / 3 / 10 / 4	Francesc Bové i Tarragó (CiU)
1995	1 / 2 / 4 / 9 / 3	Francesc Bové i Tarragó (CiU)
1999	1 / 5 / 11 / 2	Xavier Pallarès (CiU)
2003	1 / 4 / 2 / 11 / 1	Xavier Pallarès (CiU) (2003-2006)
2003	1 / 4 / 2 / 11 / 1	Pere Martí (CiU) (2006-2007)
2007	2 / 6 / 1 / 9 / 1	Pere Martí (CiU) (2007-2009)
2007	2 / 6 / 1 / 9 / 1	Àngel Ferràs (CiU) (2009-2011)
2011	2 / 5 / 2 / 9 / 1	Carles Luz (CiU, JxCat)
2015	1 / 5 / 1 / 1 / 1 / 9 / 1	Carles Luz (CiU, JxCat)
2019	1 / 6 / 2 / 1 / 9	Neus Sanromà (ERC)
2023	2 / 6 / 3 / 8	Lluís Agut (UPTA–PSC) (2023-2025)
2023	2 / 6 / 3 / 8	TBD (ERC) (2025-2027)

==== Comarcal Council of Urgell ====
Councilors in the Comarcal Council of Urgell since 1988
Key to parties CUP ERC AIPN Independents Tàrrega and Aggregated PSC Reagrupament i Solidaritat–E Sumem per Tàrrega JxCat Junts CiU PP
Election	Distribution	President
1987	1 / 3 / 2 / 1 / 12	Jaume Aligué i Escudé (CiU)
1991	3 / 1 / 15	Jaume Aligué i Escudé (CiU)
1995	1 / 1 / 3 / 12 / 2	Pere Grau (CiU)
1999	1 / 1 / 3 / 13 / 1	Pere Grau (CiU) (1999-2000)
1999	1 / 1 / 3 / 13 / 1	Rosa Maria Mora (CiU) (2000-2003)
2003	3 / 2 / 3 / 10 / 1	Rosa Maria Mora (CiU)
2007	5 / 4 / 10	Rosa Maria Mora (CiU)
2011	4 / 3 / 1 / 10 / 1	Rosa Maria Mora (CiU)
2015	2 / 7 / 10	Salvador Bonjoch (CiU, JxCat)
2019	1 / 8 / 1 / 9	Gerard Balcells (ERC)
2023	1 / 9 / 1 / 8	José Luis Marín (ERC)

==== Comarcal Council of Vallès Occidental ====
Councilors in the Comarcal Council of Vallès Occidental since 1987
Key to parties CUP ICV ICV–EUiA–EPM BComú–E (ENTESA) En Comú–ECG ECG–C ERC Independent TxT PSC JxCat Junts CiU Cs PP Vox
Election	Distribution	President
1987	11 / 14 / 13 / 1	Antoni Farrés i Sabater (PSUC)
1991	8 / 1 / 15 / 14 / 1	Oriol Civil (PSC)
1991	8 / 1 / 15 / 14 / 1	Carles Ferré (PSC)
1995	10 / 2 / 12 / 11 / 4	Carles Ferré (PSC)
1999	1 / 6 / 2 / 16 / 10 / 4	Carles Ferré (PSC) (1999-2001)
1999	1 / 6 / 2 / 16 / 10 / 4	Teresa Padrós (PSC) (2001-2003)
2003	5 / 5 / 17 / 8 / 4	Josep Vilaró (PSC)
2007	5 / 4 / 1 / 16 / 9 / 4	Antoni Rebolleda (PSC)
2011	5 / 3 / 1 / 13 / 11 / 6	Pepita Pedraza (PSC)
2015	5 / 6 / 7 / 9 / 6 / 4 / 2	Ignasi Giménez Renom (PSC)
2019	2 / 3 / 10 / 2 / 12 / 5 / 4 / 1	Ignasi Giménez Renom (PSC)
2023	2 / 3 / 7 / 2 / 14 / 5 / 3 / 3	Ignasi Giménez Renom (PSC)

==== Comarcal Council of Vallès Oriental ====
Councilors in the Comarcal Council of Vallès Oriental since 1987
Key to parties CUP ICV ICV–EUiA–EPM BComú–E (ENTESA) En Comú–ECG ECG–C ERC AAEVO PSC JxCat Junts PDeCAT CiU Cs PP Vox
Election	Distribution	President
1987	3 / 2 / 11 / 17	Josep Serratusell (CiU)
1991	3 / 1 / 3 / 12 / 14	Jordi Terrades (PSC)
1995	3 / 3 / 3 / 10 / 12 / 2	Jordi Terrades (PSC)
1999	1 / 3 / 14 / 13 / 2	Jordi Terrades (PSC)
2003	4 / 5 / 12 / 10 / 2	Joan Castaño (PSC)
2007	3 / 4 / 14 / 10 / 2	Antonio Rísquez (PSC)
2011	4 / 4 / 12 / 10 / 3	José Orive (PSC)
2015	2 / 4 / 8 / 9 / 8 / 1 / 1	David Ricart (ERC)
2019	1 / 2 / 11 / 10 / 7 / 2	Emilio Cordero (PSC)
2023	1 / 3 / 8 / 12 / 8 / 1	Emilio Cordero (PSC)

== Bibliography ==
- Moreno, Angel M. (June 2016). Merloni, Francesco (ed.). Regionalisation Trends in European Countries 2007-2015: Spain. Congress of Local and Regional Authorities of The Council of Europe. pp. 183–191.
- Albet i Mas, Abel (2019). "The municipal map in Spain: structure, evolution and problems" (PDF). Geopolitica(s). Revista de estudios sobre espacio y poder (in Spanish). 10 (1): 11–40. doi:10.5209/GEOP.63834.

== See also ==
- Local government in Spain
- Comarcas of Spain
