= Potaxie =

Internet slang

Potaxie is a term used primarily by Generation Z, Generation Alpha, millennials, and especially by the Spanish-speaking LGBT community, in TikTok and on other Internet platforms. It is used to refer to a group of Internet users who create and consume humorous content within the narrative framework known as the Potaxie Lore. This lore has an imaginary universe featuring kingdoms, hierarchies, conflicts and canonized figures that serve as icons for humorous and collective identity, often illustrated using artificial intelligence. Part of this content aims to counteract the presence of sexist and homophobic attitudes in the Internet. It is related to Floptok, and there are similarities between the two, most noticeably with the shared importance of the "Jiafei" meme and American rapper, Cupcakke.

== Origin and universe ==
The avocado emoji used as an identity symbol of the "potaxie" community

According to this Internet subculture, "potaxie" is the antonym of "fifa", "fife", or "fifx", terms that are used to describe men or heterosexual people who like football (soccer) and display sexist attitudes. The term "potaxie" seems to have its origin in a 2020 video of a Dominican content creator who, when talking about the properties of avocado, a fruit rich in potassium, pronounced it as "potaxium". Hence, the main emoji used to denote the same is an avocado.

According to the TikTok account Memetaverso, the so-called potaxie universe emerged in May 2021 when edited promotional videos of the Chinese company Douyin went viral. Know Your Meme traces its origins to the "Jiafei" meme. According to Urban Dictionary, the first record of the term is from March 2022 and is described as "Jiafei soldiers, talented in Spanish and killing fifx, besties of tilinx".

The trend became more popular in July 2022, when fans of the Jiafei meme called themselves "potaxies". People who identify themselves as potaxies or those who are on the "potaxie side" of TikTok, have also collectively developed a narrative featuring an own vocabulary, one of the most viral terms being "puchaina".

The Legends on Puchainas are fictional stories that reference female empowerment and are generally illustrated with images generated by artificial intelligence. The word "puchaina" derives from the English pronunciation of the song Vagina by the American singer and rapper Cupcakke.

The origin of the legends can be traced back to February 2024, when a video using the audio "The Theory of Black Puchaina" appeared. Later, on 19 March 2024, "The Legend of the Puchaina Who Disappeared in the Anekakanekulx Forest" of Jiafei Store, received more than nine million views in two months and prompted other creators to join the trend.

== Impact ==
During the COVID-19 pandemic, the term potaxie was used by Netflix Mexico to include in several videos posted on its official TikTok account.

By August 2023, the hashtag #potaxie had reached 1.7 billion views on TikTok. According to some sources, the Potaxie community functions as a form of digital activism that advocates for a world in which diversity and freedom of expression are respected, positioning itself against more traditional and conservative worldviews.

Major companies like Dia or Telecinco joined the trend with their own Puchaina legends. Even the Spanish political party, Spanish Socialist Workers' Party, created its own Puchaina legend to promote itself for the European Parliament elections.

In 2024, the term gained prominence in various events in Spain such as the Benidorm Fest, and during the campaign for the Catalan parliamentary elections, including references by Jéssica Albiach and Comuns Sumar.

Interest in the phenomenon reached its highest level in 2024 and subsequently declined gradually over the following years.
