= Barcelona (Parliament of Catalonia constituency) =

Coordinates: 41°27′N 2°5′E

- Parliament of Catalonia; Electoral constituency
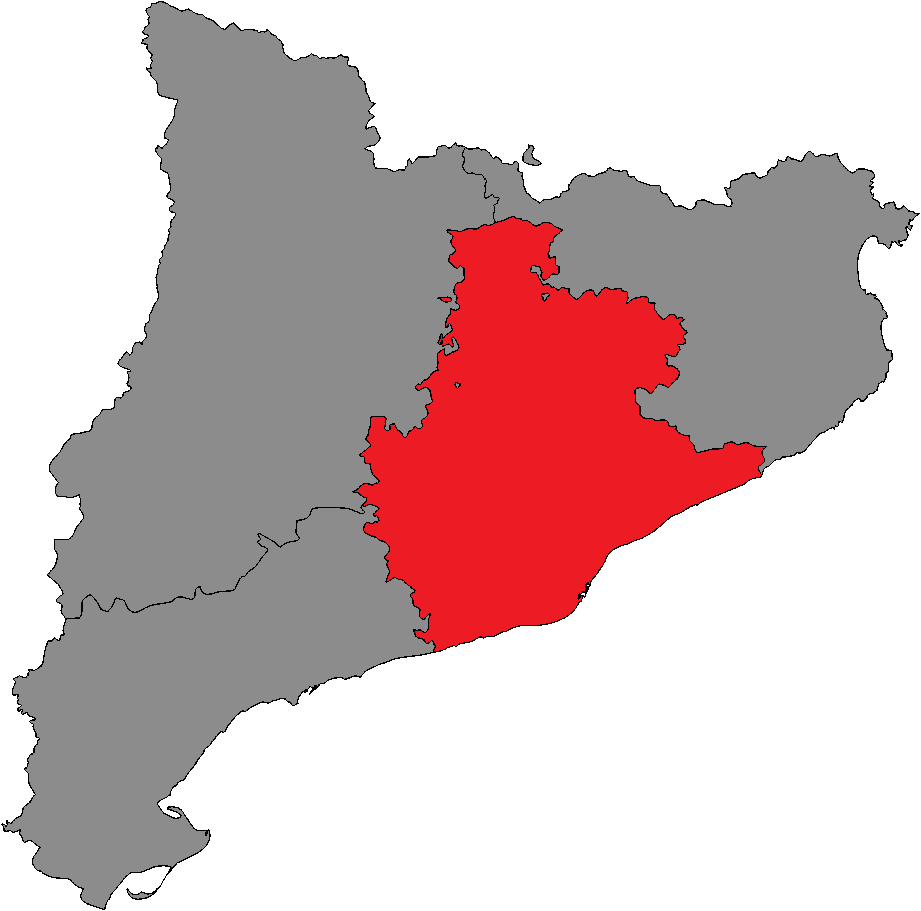
- Location of Barcelona within Catalonia
- Province: Barcelona
- Autonomous community: Catalonia
- Population: ▲5,899,063 (2024)
- Electorate: ▲4,278,557 (2024)
- Major settlements: Barcelona, Hospitalet de Llobregat, Badalona, Terrassa, Sabadell, Mataró, Santa Coloma de Gramenet

Current constituency
- Created: 1980
- Seats: 85
- Members: PSC (28); Cat–Junts+ (18); ERC (12); PP (11); Vox (7); Comuns Sumar (6); CUP (3)

Barcelona is one of the four constituencies (Spanish: circunscripciones) represented in the Parliament of Catalonia, the regional legislature of the autonomous community of Catalonia. The constituency currently elects 85 deputies. Its boundaries correspond to those of the Spanish province of Barcelona. The electoral system uses the D'Hondt method and closed-list proportional representation, with a minimum threshold of three percent.

== Electoral system ==
The constituency was created as per the Statute of Autonomy of Catalonia of 1979 and was first contested in the 1980 regional election. The Statute requires for an electoral law to be passed by a two-thirds supermajority in the Parliament of Catalonia, but transitory provisions provide for the four provinces in Catalonia—Barcelona, Girona, Lleida and Tarragona—to be established as multi-member districts in the Parliament. Each constituency is allocated a fixed number of seats: 85 for Barcelona, 17 for Girona, 15 for Lleida and 18 for Tarragona.

Voting is on the basis of universal suffrage, which comprises all nationals over eighteen, registered in Catalonia and in full enjoyment of their political rights. Amendments to the electoral law in 2011 required for Catalans abroad to apply for voting before being permitted to vote, a system known as "begged" or expat vote (Spanish: Voto rogado) which was abolished in 2022. Seats are elected using the D'Hondt method and a closed list proportional representation, with an electoral threshold of three percent of valid votes—which includes blank ballots—being applied in each constituency. The use of the D'Hondt method may result in a higher effective threshold, depending on the district magnitude.

The electoral law allows for parties and federations registered in the interior ministry, coalitions and groupings of electors to present lists of candidates. Parties and federations intending to form a coalition ahead of an election are required to inform the relevant Electoral Commission within ten days of the election call—fifteen before 1985—whereas groupings of electors need to secure the signature of at least one percent of the electorate in the constituencies for which they seek election—one-thousandth of the electorate, with a compulsory minimum of 500 signatures, until 1985—disallowing electors from signing for more than one list of candidates.

== Deputies ==
Deputies 1980–present
Key to parties CUP JxSí PSUC IC/ICV–EUiA CatSíqueesPot CatComú–Podem ECP Comuns Sumar ERC/ERC–CatSí PSA–PA PSC CDS JxCat/Junts JuntsxCat Cs SI CiU CC–UCD PP CP AP Vox
| Parliament | Election | Distribution |
| 1st | 1980 | 20 / 8 / 2 / 22 / 26 / 7 |
| 2nd | 1984 | 5 / 3 / 29 / 41 / 7 |
| 3rd | 1988 | 8 / 3 / 28 / 3 / 39 / 4 |
| 4th | 1992 | 6 / 6 / 27 / 41 / 5 |
| 5th | 1995 | 10 / 7 / 22 / 34 / 12 |
| 6th | 1999 | 3 / 7 / 36 / 31 / 8 |
| 7th | 2003 | 7 / 13 / 29 / 25 / 11 |
| 8th | 2006 | 9 / 11 / 25 / 3 / 27 / 10 |
| 9th | 2010 | 8 / 6 / 18 / 3 / 3 / 35 / 12 |
| 10th | 2012 | 3 / 10 / 12 / 14 / 8 / 26 / 12 |
| 11th | 2015 | 7 / 32 / 9 / 12 / 17 / 8 |
| 12th | 2017 | 3 / 7 / 18 / 13 / 17 / 24 / 3 |
| 13/14th | 2021 | 5 / 7 / 19 / 23 / 16 / 5 / 3 / 7 |
| 15th | 2024 | 3 / 6 / 12 / 28 / 18 / 11 / 7 |

== Regional elections ==
=== 2024 ===
Summary of the 12 May 2024 Parliament of Catalonia election results in Barcelona
| Parties and alliances | Popular vote | | | Seats | |
| Parties and alliances | Votes | % | ±pp | Total | +/− |
|---|---|---|---|---|---|
| Socialists' Party of Catalonia (PSC–PSOE) | 707,234 | 29.88 | +4.84 | 28 | +5 |
| Together+Carles Puigdemont for Catalonia (Cat–Junts+) | 457,744 | 19.34 | +1.42 | 18 | +2 |
| Republican Left of Catalonia (ERC) | 316,212 | 13.36 | –7.06 | 12 | –7 |
| People's Party (PP) | 274,054 | 11.58 | +7.53 | 11 | +8 |
| Vox (Vox) | 188,828 | 7.98 | +0.18 | 7 | ±0 |
| Commons Unite (Comuns Sumar)^{1} | 158,343 | 6.69 | –1.07 | 6 | –1 |
| Popular Unity Candidacy–Let's Defend the Land (CUP–DT) | 94,123 | 3.98 | –2.33 | 3 | –2 |
| Catalan Alliance (Aliança.cat) | 67,896 | 2.87 | New | 0 | ±0 |
| Animalist Party with the Environment (PACMA) | 28,067 | 1.19 | New | 0 | ±0 |
| Citizens–Party of the Citizenry (Cs) | 19,633 | 0.83 | –5.27 | 0 | –5 |
| At the Same Time (Alhora)^{2} | 10,627 | 0.45 | +0.24 | 0 | ±0 |
| Workers' Front (FO) | 8,218 | 0.35 | New | 0 | ±0 |
| Communist Party of the Workers of Catalonia (PCTC) | 3,267 | 0.14 | –0.03 | 0 | ±0 |
| Zero Cuts (Recortes Cero) | 2,835 | 0.12 | –0.40 | 0 | ±0 |
| For a Fairer World (PUM+J) | 2,049 | 0.09 | New | 0 | ±0 |
| Left for Spain (IZQP–Unidos–DEf)^{3} | 1,706 | 0.07 | –0.02 | 0 | ±0 |
| Blank ballots | 25,873 | 1.09 | +0.28 | | |
| Total | 2,366,709 | | | 85 | ±0 |
| Valid votes | 2,366,709 | 99.27 | +0.55 | | |
| Invalid votes | 17,510 | 0.73 | –0.55 | | |
| Votes cast / turnout | 2,384,219 | 55.72 | +4.32 | | |
| Abstentions | 1,894,848 | 44.28 | –4.32 | | |
| Registered voters | 4,279,067 | | | | |
Sources
Footnotes: ^{1} Commons Unite results are compared to In Common We Can–We Can In Common totals in the 2021 election.; ^{2} At the Same Time results are compared to Primaries for the Independence of Catalonia Movement totals in the 2021 election.; ^{3} Left for Spain results are compared to Left in Positive totals in the 2021 election.

=== 2021 ===
Summary of the 14 February 2021 Parliament of Catalonia election results in Barcelona
| Parties and alliances | Popular vote | | | Seats | |
| Parties and alliances | Votes | % | ±pp | Total | +/− |
|---|---|---|---|---|---|
| Socialists' Party of Catalonia (PSC–PSOE) | 533,051 | 25.04 | +9.89 | 23 | +10 |
| Republican Left of Catalonia (ERC) | 434,685 | 20.42 | –0.21 | 19 | +1 |
| Together for Catalonia (JxCat)^{1} | 381,541 | 17.92 | n/a | 16 | +4 |
| Vox (Vox) | 166,166 | 7.80 | New | 7 | +7 |
| In Common We Can–We Can In Common (ECP–PEC)^{2} | 165,304 | 7.76 | –0.66 | 7 | ±0 |
| Popular Unity Candidacy–A New Cycle to Win (CUP–G) | 134,265 | 6.31 | +1.94 | 5 | +2 |
| Citizens–Party of the Citizenry (Cs) | 129,889 | 6.10 | –20.33 | 5 | –19 |
| People's Party (PP) | 86,266 | 4.05 | –0.30 | 3 | ±0 |
| Catalan European Democratic Party (PDeCAT)^{1} | 53,378 | 2.51 | n/a | 0 | –5 |
| Zero Cuts–Green Group–Municipalists (Recortes Cero–GV–M) | 10,981 | 0.52 | +0.26 | 0 | ±0 |
| Primaries for the Independence of Catalonia Movement (MPIC) | 4,405 | 0.21 | New | 0 | ±0 |
| Communist Party of the Workers of Catalonia (PCTC) | 3,557 | 0.17 | New | 0 | ±0 |
| National Front of Catalonia (FNC) | 3,247 | 0.15 | New | 0 | ±0 |
| Nationalist Party of Catalonia (PNC) | 3,147 | 0.15 | New | 0 | ±0 |
| Left in Positive (IZQP) | 1,904 | 0.09 | New | 0 | ±0 |
| Blank ballots | 17,194 | 0.81 | +0.38 | | |
| Total | 2,128,980 | | | 85 | ±0 |
| Valid votes | 2,128,980 | 98.72 | –0.95 | | |
| Invalid votes | 27,560 | 1.28 | +0.95 | | |
| Votes cast / turnout | 2,156,540 | 51.40 | –27.92 | | |
| Abstentions | 2,038,926 | 48.60 | +27.92 | | |
| Registered voters | 4,195,466 | | | | |
Sources
Footnotes: ^{1} Within the Together for Catalonia alliance in the 2017 election.; ^{2} In Common We Can–We Can In Common results are compared to Catalonia in Common–We Can totals in the 2017 election.

=== 2017 ===
Summary of the 21 December 2017 Parliament of Catalonia election results in Barcelona
| Parties and alliances | Popular vote | | | Seats | |
| Parties and alliances | Votes | % | ±pp | Total | +/− |
|---|---|---|---|---|---|
| Citizens–Party of the Citizenry (Cs) | 868,365 | 26.43 | +7.59 | 24 | +7 |
| Republican Left–Catalonia Yes (ERC–CatSí)^{1} | 678,030 | 20.63 | n/a | 18 | +3 |
| Together for Catalonia (JuntsxCat)^{1} | 624,261 | 19.00 | n/a | 17 | +1 |
| Socialists' Party of Catalonia (PSC–PSOE) | 497,650 | 15.15 | +1.48 | 13 | +1 |
| Catalonia in Common–We Can (CatComú–Podem)^{2} | 276,810 | 8.42 | –1.71 | 7 | –2 |
| Popular Unity Candidacy (CUP) | 143,711 | 4.37 | –3.91 | 3 | –4 |
| People's Party (PP) | 142,934 | 4.35 | –4.50 | 3 | –5 |
| Animalist Party Against Mistreatment of Animals (PACMA) | 31,330 | 0.95 | +0.17 | 0 | ±0 |
| Zero Cuts–Green Group (Recortes Cero–GV) | 8,621 | 0.26 | –0.14 | 0 | ±0 |
| Republican Dialogue (Diàleg) | 0 | 0.00 | New | 0 | ±0 |
| Together for Yes (Independents) (JxSí)^{1} | n/a | n/a | n/a | 0 | –1 |
| Blank ballots | 14,163 | 0.43 | –0.07 | | |
| Total | 3,285,875 | | | 85 | ±0 |
| Valid votes | 3,285,875 | 99.67 | ±0.00 | | |
| Invalid votes | 10,925 | 0.33 | ±0.00 | | |
| Votes cast / turnout | 3,296,800 | 79.32 | +4.29 | | |
| Abstentions | 859,509 | 20.68 | –4.29 | | |
| Registered voters | 4,156,309 | | | | |
Sources
Footnotes: ^{1} Within the Junts pel Sí alliance in the 2015 election. Totals for JuntsxCat are compared to CDC. Totals for ERC–CatSí include DC and MES. Also including JuntsxCat and ERC aligned independents from 2015.; ^{2} Catalonia in Common–We Can results are compared to Catalonia Yes We Can totals in the 2015 election.

=== 2015 ===
Summary of the 27 September 2015 Parliament of Catalonia election results in Barcelona
| Parties and alliances | Popular vote | | | Seats | |
| Parties and alliances | Votes | % | ±pp | Total | +/− |
|---|---|---|---|---|---|
| Together for Yes (JxSí)^{1} | 1,112,922 | 36.09 | –4.71 | 32 | –6 |
| Citizens–Party of the Citizenry (C's) | 581,032 | 18.84 | +10.41 | 17 | +9 |
| Socialists' Party of Catalonia (PSC–PSOE) | 421,487 | 13.67 | –1.73 | 12 | –2 |
| Catalonia Yes We Can (CatSíqueesPot)^{2} | 312,527 | 10.13 | –1.01 | 9 | –1 |
| People's Party (PP) | 272,804 | 8.85 | –4.42 | 8 | –4 |
| Popular Unity Candidacy (CUP) | 255,328 | 8.28 | +4.87 | 7 | +4 |
| Democratic Union of Catalonia (unio.cat) | 75,700 | 2.45 | New | 0 | ±0 |
| Animalist Party Against Mistreatment of Animals (PACMA) | 24,426 | 0.78 | +0.18 | 0 | ±0 |
| Zero Cuts–The Greens (Recortes Cero–EV) | 12,329 | 0.40 | New | 0 | ±0 |
| Blank ballots | 15,493 | 0.50 | –0.89 | | |
| Total | 3,084,048 | | | 85 | ±0 |
| Valid votes | 3,084,048 | 99.67 | +0.52 | | |
| Invalid votes | 10,314 | 0.33 | –0.52 | | |
| Votes cast / turnout | 3,094,362 | 75.03 | +7.03 | | |
| Abstentions | 1,029,987 | 24.97 | –7.03 | | |
| Registered voters | 4,124,349 | | | | |
Sources
Footnotes: ^{1} Together for Yes results are compared to the combined totals of Convergence and Union and Republican Left of Catalonia in the 2012 election.; ^{2} Catalonia Yes We Can results are compared to Initiative for Catalonia Greens–United and Alternative Left totals in the 2012 election.

=== 2012 ===
Summary of the 25 November 2012 Parliament of Catalonia election results in Barcelona
| Parties and alliances | Popular vote | | | Seats | |
| Parties and alliances | Votes | % | ±pp | Total | +/− |
|---|---|---|---|---|---|
| Convergence and Union (CiU) | 765,330 | 28.08 | –8.72 | 26 | –9 |
| Socialists' Party of Catalonia (PSC–PSOE) | 419,779 | 15.40 | –3.79 | 14 | –4 |
| People's Party (PP) | 361,656 | 13.27 | +0.40 | 12 | ±0 |
| Republican Left of Catalonia–Catalonia Yes (ERC–CatSí) | 346,662 | 12.72 | +6.36 | 12 | +6 |
| Initiative for Catalonia Greens–United and Alternative Left (ICV–EUiA) | 303,625 | 11.14 | +2.88 | 10 | +2 |
| Citizens–Party of the Citizenry (C's) | 229,746 | 8.43 | +4.59 | 8 | +5 |
| Popular Unity Candidacy–Left Alternative (CUP) | 92,794 | 3.41 | New | 3 | +3 |
| Platform for Catalonia (PxC) | 51,403 | 1.89 | –0.56 | 0 | ±0 |
| Catalan Solidarity for Independence (SI) | 32,296 | 1.19 | –1.91 | 0 | –3 |
| Blank Seats (EB) | 22,817 | 0.84 | +0.23 | 0 | ±0 |
| Animalist Party Against Mistreatment of Animals (PACMA) | 16,479 | 0.60 | +0.11 | 0 | ±0 |
| Pirates of Catalonia (Pirata.cat) | 15,241 | 0.56 | +0.35 | 0 | ±0 |
| Union, Progress and Democracy (UPyD) | 12,147 | 0.45 | +0.25 | 0 | ±0 |
| Hartos.org (Hartos.org) | 9,185 | 0.32 | New | 0 | ±0 |
| Democratic Way (VD) | 5,984 | 0.16 | New | 0 | ±0 |
| Communist Unification of Spain (UCE) | 1,998 | 0.07 | +0.04 | 0 | ±0 |
| Blank ballots | 37,999 | 1.39 | –1.52 | | |
| Total | 2,725,141 | | | 85 | ±0 |
| Valid votes | 2,725,141 | 99.15 | –0.22 | | |
| Invalid votes | 23,341 | 0.85 | +0.22 | | |
| Votes cast / turnout | 2,748,482 | 68.00 | +9.12 | | |
| Abstentions | 1,293,428 | 32.00 | –9.12 | | |
| Registered voters | 4,041,910 | | | | |

=== 2010 ===
Summary of the 28 November 2010 Parliament of Catalonia election results in Barcelona
| Parties and alliances | Popular vote | | | Seats | |
| Parties and alliances | Votes | % | ±pp | Total | +/− |
|---|---|---|---|---|---|
| Convergence and Union (CiU) | 862,010 | 36.80 | +6.91 | 35 | +8 |
| Socialists' Party of Catalonia (PSC–PSOE) | 449,549 | 19.19 | –8.71 | 18 | –7 |
| People's Party (PP) | 301,440 | 12.87 | +1.71 | 12 | +2 |
| Initiative for Catalonia Greens–United and Alternative Left (ICV–EUiA) | 193,545 | 8.26 | –2.12 | 8 | –1 |
| Republican Left of Catalonia (ERC) | 148,973 | 6.36 | –6.25 | 6 | –5 |
| Citizens–Party of the Citizenry (C's) | 89,990 | 3.84 | +0.31 | 3 | ±0 |
| Catalan Solidarity for Independence (SI) | 72,693 | 3.10 | New | 3 | +3 |
| Platform for Catalonia (PxC) | 57,381 | 2.45 | New | 0 | ±0 |
| Independence Rally (RI.cat) | 23,185 | 0.99 | New | 0 | ±0 |
| Blank Seats–Citizens for Blank Votes (EB–CenB)^{1} | 14,185 | 0.61 | +0.36 | 0 | ±0 |
| The Greens–European Green Group (EV–GVE) | 12,087 | 0.52 | –0.28 | 0 | ±0 |
| Anti-Bullfighting Party Against Mistreatment of Animals (PACMA) | 11,593 | 0.49 | –0.01 | 0 | ±0 |
| From Below (Des de Baix) | 5,613 | 0.24 | New | 0 | ±0 |
| Pirates of Catalonia (Pirata.cat) | 5,001 | 0.21 | New | 0 | ±0 |
| Union, Progress and Democracy (UPyD) | 4,634 | 0.20 | New | 0 | ±0 |
| Reus Independent Coordinator (CORI) | 4,425 | 0.19 | New | 0 | ±0 |
| Pensioners in Action Party (PDLPEA) | 2,508 | 0.11 | New | 0 | ±0 |
| Communist Party of the Catalan People (PCPC) | 2,262 | 0.10 | –0.06 | 0 | ±0 |
| Government Alternative (AG) | 2,208 | 0.09 | New | 0 | ±0 |
| For a Fairer World (PUM+J) | 1,774 | 0.08 | New | 0 | ±0 |
| Family and Life Party (PFiV) | 1,624 | 0.07 | –0.02 | 0 | ±0 |
| Internationalist Socialist Workers' Party (POSI) | 1,399 | 0.06 | –0.12 | 0 | ±0 |
| Spanish Phalanx of the CNSO (FE de las JONS) | 1,250 | 0.05 | New | 0 | ±0 |
| Left Republican Party–Republican Left (PRE–IR) | 1,101 | 0.05 | New | 0 | ±0 |
| Castilian Party (PCAS) | 1,066 | 0.05 | New | 0 | ±0 |
| Humanist Party (PH) | 856 | 0.04 | –0.06 | 0 | ±0 |
| Communist Unification of Spain (UCE) | 726 | 0.03 | New | 0 | ±0 |
| Our People (GN) | 597 | 0.03 | New | 0 | ±0 |
| Republican Social Movement (MSR) | 490 | 0.02 | –0.01 | 0 | ±0 |
| Blank ballots | 68,241 | 2.89 | +0.85 | | |
| Total | 2,342,406 | | | 85 | ±0 |
| Valid votes | 2,342,406 | 99.37 | –0.24 | | |
| Invalid votes | 14,857 | 0.63 | +0.24 | | |
| Votes cast / turnout | 2,357,263 | 58.88 | +2.94 | | |
| Abstentions | 1,646,488 | 41.12 | –2.94 | | |
| Registered voters | 4,003,751 | | | | |
Sources
Footnotes: ^{1} Blank Seats–Citizens for Blank Votes results are compared to the combined totals of Unsubmissive Seats–Alternative of Discontented Democrats and Citizens for Blank Votes in the 2006 election.

=== 2006 ===
Summary of the 1 November 2006 Parliament of Catalonia election results in Barcelona
| Parties and alliances | Popular vote | | | Seats | |
| Parties and alliances | Votes | % | ±pp | Total | +/− |
|---|---|---|---|---|---|
| Convergence and Union (CiU) | 664,723 | 29.89 | +1.11 | 27 | +2 |
| Socialists' Party of Catalonia–Citizens for Change (PSC–CpC) | 620,601 | 27.90 | –5.27 | 25 | –4 |
| Republican Left of Catalonia (ERC) | 280,566 | 12.61 | –2.55 | 11 | –2 |
| People's Party (PP) | 248,165 | 11.16 | –1.39 | 10 | –1 |
| Initiative for Catalonia Greens–United and Alternative Left (ICV–EUiA) | 230,968 | 10.38 | +2.35 | 9 | +2 |
| Citizens–Party of the Citizenry (C's) | 78,525 | 3.53 | New | 3 | +3 |
| The Greens–Ecologists and Greens of Catalonia (EV–EVC) | 17,900 | 0.80 | +0.06 | 0 | ±0 |
| Anti-Bullfighting Party Against Mistreatment of Animals (PACMA) | 11,085 | 0.50 | New | 0 | ±0 |
| Unsubmissive Seats–Alternative of Discontented Democrats (Ei–ADD) | 5,662 | 0.25 | +0.17 | 0 | ±0 |
| Internationalist Socialist Workers' Party (POSI) | 4,039 | 0.18 | +0.07 | 0 | ±0 |
| Catalan Republican Party (RC) | 4,003 | 0.18 | New | 0 | ±0 |
| Communist Party of the Catalan People (PCPC) | 3,527 | 0.16 | +0.08 | 0 | ±0 |
| Humanist Party of Catalonia (PHC) | 2,135 | 0.10 | +0.05 | 0 | ±0 |
| Forward Catalonia Platform (AES–DN) | 2,131 | 0.10 | New | 0 | ±0 |
| Family and Life Party (PFiV) | 2,048 | 0.09 | New | 0 | ±0 |
| Carmel/Blue Party (PAzul) | 1,039 | 0.05 | New | 0 | ±0 |
| Republican Social Movement (MSR) | 776 | 0.03 | +0.01 | 0 | ±0 |
| Catalonia Decides (Decideix.cat) | 668 | 0.03 | New | 0 | ±0 |
| Blank ballots | 45,558 | 2.05 | +1.14 | | |
| Total | 2,224,119 | | | 85 | ±0 |
| Valid votes | 2,224,119 | 99.61 | –0.17 | | |
| Invalid votes | 8,753 | 0.39 | +0.17 | | |
| Votes cast / turnout | 2,232,872 | 55.94 | –6.16 | | |
| Abstentions | 1,759,032 | 44.06 | +6.16 | | |
| Registered voters | 3,991,904 | | | | |

=== 2003 ===
Summary of the 16 November 2003 Parliament of Catalonia election results in Barcelona
| Parties and alliances | Popular vote | | | Seats | |
| Parties and alliances | Votes | % | ±pp | Total | +/− |
|---|---|---|---|---|---|
| Socialists' Party of Catalonia–Citizens for Change (PSC–CpC) | 824,270 | 33.17 | –6.82 | 29 | –7 |
| Convergence and Union (CiU) | 715,140 | 28.78 | –6.36 | 25 | –6 |
| Republican Left of Catalonia (ERC) | 376,669 | 15.16 | +7.43 | 13 | +6 |
| People's Party (PP) | 311,928 | 12.55 | +2.64 | 11 | +3 |
| Initiative for Catalonia Greens–Alternative Left (ICV–EA)^{1} | 199,553 | 8.03 | +3.08 | 7 | +4 |
| The Greens–The Ecologist Alternative (EV–AE) | 18,470 | 0.74 | New | 0 | ±0 |
| Platform for Catalonia (PxC) | 3,060 | 0.12 | New | 0 | ±0 |
| Internationalist Socialist Workers' Party (POSI) | 2,773 | 0.11 | –0.01 | 0 | ±0 |
| Unsubmissive Seats (Ei) | 1,905 | 0.08 | New | 0 | ±0 |
| Communist Party of the Catalan People (PCPC) | 1,891 | 0.08 | New | 0 | ±0 |
| Another Democracy is Possible (UADeP) | 1,211 | 0.05 | New | 0 | ±0 |
| Humanist Party of Catalonia (PHC) | 1,188 | 0.05 | +0.01 | 0 | ±0 |
| Catalan State (EC) | 1,162 | 0.05 | ±0.00 | 0 | ±0 |
| Democratic and Social Centre (CDS) | 1,073 | 0.04 | –0.01 | 0 | ±0 |
| Caló Nationalist Party (PNCA) | 636 | 0.03 | New | 0 | ±0 |
| Spaniards Under Separatism (EBS) | 603 | 0.02 | New | 0 | ±0 |
| Republican Social Movement (MSR) | 602 | 0.02 | New | 0 | ±0 |
| Internationalist Struggle (LI (LIT–CI)) | 491 | 0.02 | +0.01 | 0 | ±0 |
| Blank ballots | 22,546 | 0.91 | –0.01 | | |
| Total | 2,485,171 | | | 85 | ±0 |
| Valid votes | 2,485,171 | 99.78 | ±0.00 | | |
| Invalid votes | 5,416 | 0.22 | ±0.00 | | |
| Votes cast / turnout | 2,490,587 | 62.10 | +3.25 | | |
| Abstentions | 1,520,247 | 37.90 | –3.25 | | |
| Registered voters | 4,010,834 | | | | |
Sources
Footnotes: ^{1} Initiative for Catalonia Greens–Alternative Left results are compared to the combined totals of Initiative for Catalonia–Greens and United and Alternative Left in the 1999 election.

=== 1999 ===
Summary of the 17 October 1999 Parliament of Catalonia election results in Barcelona
| Parties and alliances | Popular vote | | | Seats | |
| Parties and alliances | Votes | % | ±pp | Total | +/− |
|---|---|---|---|---|---|
| Socialists' Party of Catalonia–Citizens for Change (PSC–CpC) | 948,202 | 39.99 | +14.56 | 36 | +14 |
| Convergence and Union (CiU) | 833,168 | 35.14 | –3.91 | 31 | –3 |
| People's Party (PP) | 234,957 | 9.91 | –3.71 | 8 | –4 |
| Republican Left of Catalonia (ERC) | 183,270 | 7.73 | –0.97 | 7 | ±0 |
| Initiative for Catalonia–Greens (IC–V)^{1} | 78,441 | 3.31 | n/a | 3 | –5 |
| United and Alternative Left (EUiA)^{1} | 38,836 | 1.64 | n/a | 0 | –1 |
| The Greens–Ecologist Confederation of Catalonia (EV–CEC)^{1} | 17,684 | 0.75 | n/a | 0 | –1 |
| The Greens–Green Alternative (EV–AV) | 5,000 | 0.21 | New | 0 | ±0 |
| Internationalist Socialist Workers' Party (POSI) | 2,784 | 0.12 | New | 0 | ±0 |
| Spanish Phalanx of the CNSO (FE–JONS) | 1,281 | 0.05 | New | 0 | ±0 |
| Democratic and Social Centre (CDS) | 1,161 | 0.05 | New | 0 | ±0 |
| Catalan State (EC) | 1,137 | 0.05 | New | 0 | ±0 |
| Humanist Party of Catalonia (PHC) | 974 | 0.04 | New | 0 | ±0 |
| Natural Law Party (PLN) | 738 | 0.03 | New | 0 | ±0 |
| Espinalist Party (PE) | 546 | 0.02 | New | 0 | ±0 |
| Federal Democratic Union (UFD) | 447 | 0.02 | New | 0 | ±0 |
| Internationalist Struggle (LI (LIT–CI)) | 323 | 0.01 | New | 0 | ±0 |
| Blank ballots | 21,926 | 0.92 | –0.07 | | |
| Total | 2,370,875 | | | 85 | ±0 |
| Valid votes | 2,370,875 | 99.78 | +0.02 | | |
| Invalid votes | 5,175 | 0.22 | –0.02 | | |
| Votes cast / turnout | 2,376,050 | 58.85 | –4.04 | | |
| Abstentions | 1,661,439 | 41.15 | +4.04 | | |
| Registered voters | 4,037,489 | | | | |
Sources
Footnotes: ^{1} Within the Initiative for Catalonia–The Greens alliance in the 1995 election.

=== 1995 ===
Summary of the 19 November 1995 Parliament of Catalonia election results in Barcelona
| Parties and alliances | Popular vote | | | Seats | |
| Parties and alliances | Votes | % | ±pp | Total | +/− |
|---|---|---|---|---|---|
| Convergence and Union (CiU) | 953,419 | 39.05 | –5.53 | 34 | –7 |
| Socialists' Party of Catalonia (PSC–PSOE) | 620,756 | 25.43 | –3.46 | 22 | –5 |
| People's Party (PP) | 332,417 | 13.62 | +7.69 | 12 | +7 |
| Initiative for Catalonia–The Greens (IC–EV)^{1} | 274,222 | 11.23 | +2.64 | 10 | +4 |
| Republican Left of Catalonia (ERC) | 212,335 | 8.70 | +1.51 | 7 | +1 |
| Ecologist Alternative of Catalonia (AEC)^{2} | 11,356 | 0.47 | –0.17 | 0 | ±0 |
| Ecologist Party of Catalonia–VERDE (PEC–VERDE) | 5,639 | 0.23 | –0.16 | 0 | ±0 |
| Revolutionary Workers' Party (POR) | 3,054 | 0.13 | +0.05 | 0 | ±0 |
| Workers' Revolutionary Party (PRT)^{3} | 1,942 | 0.08 | –0.29 | 0 | ±0 |
| Citizens of Catalonia–Platform of Independents of Spain (PICC–PIE) | 1,326 | 0.05 | New | 0 | ±0 |
| Civic Platform–New Socialist Party (PC–NPS)^{4} | 750 | 0.03 | –0.03 | 0 | ±0 |
| Blank ballots | 24,230 | 0.99 | –0.16 | | |
| Total | 2,441,446 | | | 85 | ±0 |
| Valid votes | 2,441,446 | 99.76 | +0.10 | | |
| Invalid votes | 5,895 | 0.24 | –0.10 | | |
| Votes cast / turnout | 2,447,341 | 62.89 | +9.53 | | |
| Abstentions | 1,444,094 | 37.11 | –9.53 | | |
| Registered voters | 3,891,435 | | | | |
Sources
Footnotes: ^{1} Initiative for Catalonia–The Greens results are compared to the combined totals of Initiative for Catalonia, Party of the Communists of Catalonia and Green Alternative–Nationalist Left Movement in the 1992 election.; ^{2} Ecologist Alternative of Catalonia results are compared to The Greens–Green Union totals in the 1992 election.; ^{3} Workers' Revolutionary Party results are compared to Workers' Socialist Party totals in the 1992 election.; ^{4} Civic Platform–New Socialist Party results are compared to Independent Socialists totals in the 1992 election.

=== 1992 ===
Summary of the 15 March 1992 Parliament of Catalonia election results in Barcelona
| Parties and alliances | Popular vote | | | Seats | |
| Parties and alliances | Votes | % | ±pp | Total | +/− |
|---|---|---|---|---|---|
| Convergence and Union (CiU) | 882,758 | 44.58 | +0.98 | 41 | +2 |
| Socialists' Party of Catalonia (PSC–PSOE) | 572,036 | 28.89 | –2.49 | 27 | –1 |
| Initiative for Catalonia (IC) | 146,937 | 7.42 | –1.40 | 6 | –2 |
| Republican Left of Catalonia (ERC) | 142,381 | 7.19 | +3.48 | 6 | +3 |
| People's Party (PP)^{1} | 117,409 | 5.93 | +0.70 | 5 | +1 |
| Democratic and Social Centre (CDS) | 19,505 | 0.99 | –2.86 | 0 | –3 |
| Party of the Communists of Catalonia (PCC) | 19,065 | 0.96 | New | 0 | ±0 |
| The Greens–Green Union (EV–UV) | 12,750 | 0.64 | New | 0 | ±0 |
| The Ecologists (LVE) | 9,879 | 0.50 | +0.18 | 0 | ±0 |
| Ecologist Party of Catalonia–VERDE (PEC–VERDE) | 7,786 | 0.39 | +0.14 | 0 | ±0 |
| Ruiz-Mateos Group (ARM) | 7,639 | 0.39 | New | 0 | ±0 |
| Workers' Socialist Party (PST) | 7,397 | 0.37 | +0.17 | 0 | ±0 |
| Green Alternative–Nationalist Left Movement (AV–MEN) | 4,138 | 0.21 | –0.36 | 0 | ±0 |
| Free Catalonia (CLL) | 3,374 | 0.17 | New | 0 | ±0 |
| Revolutionary Workers' Party of Spain (PORE) | 1,679 | 0.08 | –0.01 | 0 | ±0 |
| Humanist Party (PH) | 1,310 | 0.07 | –0.01 | 0 | ±0 |
| Independent Socialists (SI)^{2} | 1,251 | 0.06 | +0.02 | 0 | ±0 |
| Blank ballots | 22,711 | 1.15 | +0.55 | | |
| Total | 1,980,005 | | | 85 | ±0 |
| Valid votes | 1,980,005 | 99.66 | +0.12 | | |
| Invalid votes | 6,716 | 0.34 | –0.12 | | |
| Votes cast / turnout | 1,986,721 | 53.36 | –5.22 | | |
| Abstentions | 1,736,207 | 46.64 | +5.22 | | |
| Registered voters | 3,722,928 | | | | |
Sources
Footnotes: ^{1} People's Party results are compared to People's Alliance totals in the 1988 election.; ^{2} Independent Socialists results are compared to Alliance for the Republic totals in the 1988 election.

=== 1988 ===
Summary of the 29 May 1988 Parliament of Catalonia election results in Barcelona
| Parties and alliances | Popular vote | | | Seats | |
| Parties and alliances | Votes | % | ±pp | Total | +/− |
|---|---|---|---|---|---|
| Convergence and Union (CiU) | 894,120 | 43.60 | –0.74 | 39 | –2 |
| Socialists' Party of Catalonia (PSC–PSOE) | 643,535 | 31.38 | –0.89 | 28 | –1 |
| Initiative for Catalonia (IC)^{1} | 180,872 | 8.82 | –1.17 | 8 | +3 |
| People's Alliance (AP)^{2} | 107,217 | 5.23 | –2.33 | 4 | –3 |
| Democratic and Social Centre (CDS) | 78,927 | 3.85 | New | 3 | +3 |
| Republican Left of Catalonia (ERC) | 76,099 | 3.71 | –0.38 | 3 | ±0 |
| Green Alternative–Ecologist Movement of Catalonia (AV–MEC) | 11,589 | 0.57 | New | 0 | ±0 |
| The Ecologist Greens (EVE) | 6,526 | 0.32 | New | 0 | ±0 |
| The Greens (EV) | 6,096 | 0.30 | New | 0 | ±0 |
| Ecologist Party of Catalonia–VERDE (PEC–VERDE) | 5,017 | 0.24 | –0.15 | 0 | ±0 |
| Andalusian Party of Catalonia (PAC) | 4,947 | 0.24 | New | 0 | ±0 |
| Workers' Socialist Party (PST) | 4,031 | 0.20 | +0.02 | 0 | ±0 |
| Social Democratic Party of Catalonia (PSDC) | 3,731 | 0.18 | –0.06 | 0 | ±0 |
| Spanish Juntas (JJEE) | 3,729 | 0.18 | New | 0 | ±0 |
| Communist Unification of Spain (UCE) | 2,684 | 0.13 | New | 0 | ±0 |
| Spanish Phalanx of the CNSO (FE–JONS) | 2,009 | 0.10 | New | 0 | ±0 |
| Revolutionary Workers' Party of Spain (PORE) | 1,938 | 0.09 | ±0.00 | 0 | ±0 |
| Humanist Party of Catalonia (PHC) | 1,679 | 0.08 | New | 0 | ±0 |
| Communist Workers' League (LOC) | 1,661 | 0.08 | New | 0 | ±0 |
| Republican Popular Unity (UPR)^{3} | 788 | 0.04 | –0.02 | 0 | ±0 |
| Alliance for the Republic (AxR)^{4} | 783 | 0.04 | –0.07 | 0 | ±0 |
| Centrist Unity–Democratic Spanish Party (PED) | 590 | 0.03 | New | 0 | ±0 |
| Blank ballots | 12,208 | 0.60 | +0.12 | | |
| Total | 2,050,776 | | | 85 | ±0 |
| Valid votes | 2,050,776 | 99.54 | +0.02 | | |
| Invalid votes | 9,465 | 0.46 | –0.02 | | |
| Votes cast / turnout | 2,060,241 | 58.58 | –5.28 | | |
| Abstentions | 1,456,559 | 41.42 | +5.28 | | |
| Registered voters | 3,516,800 | | | | |
Sources
Footnotes: ^{1} Initiative for Catalonia results are compared to the combined totals of Unified Socialist Party of Catalonia, Party of the Communists of Catalonia and Agreement of the Catalan Left in the 1984 election.; ^{2} People's Alliance results are compared to People's Coalition totals in the 1984 election.; ^{3} Republican Popular Unity results are compared to Communist Party of Spain (Marxist–Leninist) totals in the 1984 election.; ^{4} Alliance for the Republic results are compared to Internationalist Socialist Workers' Party totals in the 1984 election.

=== 1984 ===
Summary of the 29 April 1984 Parliament of Catalonia election results in Barcelona
| Parties and alliances | Popular vote | | | Seats | |
| Parties and alliances | Votes | % | ±pp | Total | +/− |
|---|---|---|---|---|---|
| Convergence and Union (CiU) | 978,576 | 44.34 | +17.10 | 41 | +15 |
| Socialists' Party of Catalonia (PSC–PSOE) | 712,278 | 32.27 | +9.10 | 29 | +7 |
| People's Coalition (AP–PDP–UL)^{1} | 166,905 | 7.56 | +4.98 | 7 | +7 |
| Unified Socialist Party of Catalonia (PSUC) | 134,777 | 6.11 | –14.70 | 5 | –15 |
| Republican Left of Catalonia (ERC) | 90,255 | 4.09 | –4.21 | 3 | –5 |
| Party of the Communists of Catalonia (PCC)^{2} | 60,900 | 2.76 | +2.49 | 0 | ±0 |
| Agreement of the Catalan Left (EEC)^{3} | 24,702 | 1.12 | –0.42 | 0 | ±0 |
| Spanish Vertex Ecological Development Revindication (VERDE) | 8,714 | 0.39 | New | 0 | ±0 |
| Social Democratic Party of Catalonia (PSDC) | 5,250 | 0.24 | New | 0 | ±0 |
| Workers' Socialist Party (PST) | 3,930 | 0.18 | New | 0 | ±0 |
| Internationalist Socialist Workers' Party (POSI) | 2,467 | 0.11 | New | 0 | ±0 |
| Communist Workers' Party of Catalonia (PCOC) | 2,131 | 0.10 | –0.52 | 0 | ±0 |
| Revolutionary Workers' Party of Spain (PORE) | 1,920 | 0.09 | New | 0 | ±0 |
| Communist Party of Spain (Marxist–Leninist) (PCE (m–l)) | 1,418 | 0.06 | New | 0 | ±0 |
| Revolutionary Communist League (LCR) | 1,376 | 0.06 | New | 0 | ±0 |
| Spanish Democratic Party (PDE) | 1,110 | 0.05 | New | 0 | ±0 |
| Communist Movement of Catalonia (MCC)^{4} | 0 | 0.00 | –1.21 | 0 | ±0 |
| Centrists of Catalonia (CC–UCD) | n/a | n/a | –8.17 | 0 | –7 |
| Socialist Party of Andalusia–Andalusian Party (PSA–PA) | n/a | n/a | –3.03 | 0 | –2 |
| Blank ballots | 10,495 | 0.48 | –0.20 | | |
| Total | 2,207,204 | | | 85 | ±0 |
| Valid votes | 2,207,204 | 99.52 | ±0.00 | | |
| Invalid votes | 10,627 | 0.48 | ±0.00 | | |
| Votes cast / turnout | 2,217,831 | 63.86 | +2.76 | | |
| Abstentions | 1,255,220 | 36.14 | –2.76 | | |
| Registered voters | 3,473,051 | | | | |
Sources
Footnotes: ^{1} People's Coalition results are compared to Catalan Solidarity totals in the 1980 election.; ^{2} Party of the Communists of Catalonia results are compared to Communist Unity totals in the 1980 election.; ^{3} Agreement of the Catalan Left results are compared to Left Nationalists totals in the 1980 election.; ^{4} Communist Movement of Catalonia results are compared to Unity for Socialism totals in the 1980 election.

=== 1980 ===
Summary of the 20 March 1980 Parliament of Catalonia election results in Barcelona
| Parties and alliances | Popular vote | | | Seats | |
| Parties and alliances | Votes | % | ±pp | Total | +/− |
|---|---|---|---|---|---|
| Convergence and Union (CiU) | 570,670 | 27.24 | n/a | 26 | n/a |
| Socialists' Party of Catalonia (PSC–PSOE) | 485,324 | 23.17 | n/a | 22 | n/a |
| Unified Socialist Party of Catalonia (PSUC) | 435,887 | 20.81 | n/a | 20 | n/a |
| Republican Left of Catalonia (ERC) | 173,815 | 8.30 | n/a | 8 | n/a |
| Centrists of Catalonia (CC–UCD) | 171,122 | 8.17 | n/a | 7 | n/a |
| Socialist Party of Andalusia–Andalusian Party (PSA–PA) | 63,442 | 3.03 | n/a | 2 | n/a |
| Catalan Solidarity (SC) | 53,967 | 2.58 | n/a | 0 | n/a |
| Left Nationalists (NE) | 32,324 | 1.54 | n/a | 0 | n/a |
| Unity for Socialism (CUPS) | 28,499 | 1.36 | n/a | 0 | n/a |
| New Force (FN) | 20,074 | 0.96 | n/a | 0 | n/a |
| Communist Workers' Party of Catalonia (PCOC) | 12,963 | 0.62 | n/a | 0 | n/a |
| Left Bloc for National Liberation (BEAN) | 11,620 | 0.55 | n/a | 0 | n/a |
| Spanish Phalanx of the CNSO (FE–JONS) | 6,029 | 0.29 | n/a | 0 | n/a |
| Communist Unity (UC) | 5,710 | 0.27 | n/a | 0 | n/a |
| Independent National Party (PNI) | 4,741 | 0.23 | n/a | 0 | n/a |
| Conservatives of Catalonia (CiC) | 4,095 | 0.20 | n/a | 0 | n/a |
| Blank ballots | 14,399 | 0.68 | n/a | | |
| Total | 2,094,681 | | | 85 | n/a |
| Valid votes | 2,094,681 | 99.52 | n/a | | |
| Invalid votes | 10,086 | 0.48 | n/a | | |
| Votes cast / turnout | 2,104,767 | 61.10 | n/a | | |
| Abstentions | 1,340,012 | 38.90 | n/a | | |
| Registered voters | 3,444,779 | | | | |
