= Jéssica Albiach =

Spanish journalist and politician (born 1979)

Jéssica Albiach MP
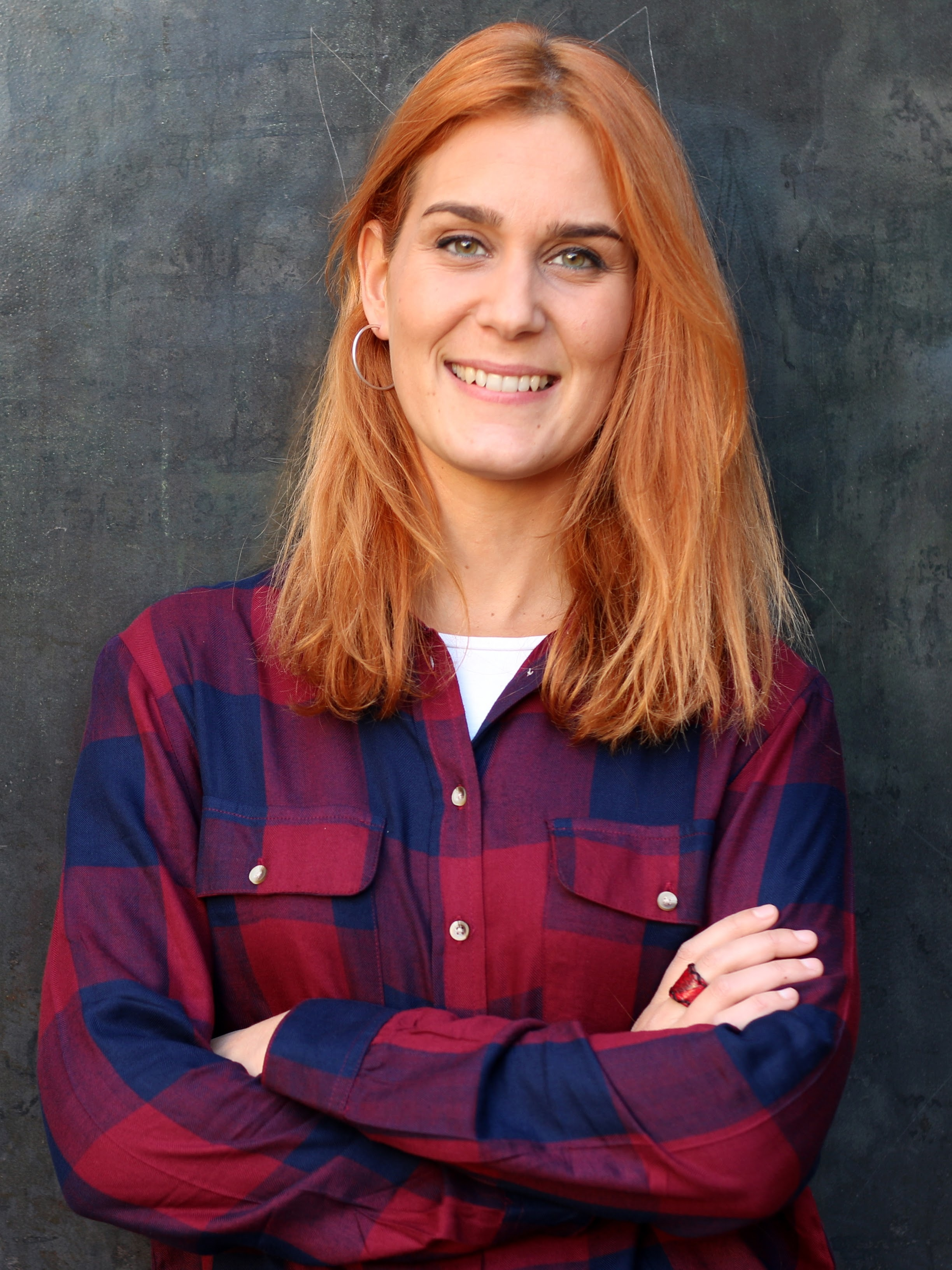
- Jéssica Albiach in 2025

Member of the Parliament of Catalonia
- Incumbent
- Assumed office 25 October 2015
- Constituency: Barcelona

Personal details
- Born: Jéssica Albiach Satorres; 29 May 1979 (age 47) Valencia, Spain
- Party: Catalunya en Comú (since 2017)
- Other political affiliations: Podemos (2014–2023)
- Education: CEU Cardinal Herrera University
- Occupation: Journalist; politician; photographer

Jéssica Albiach Satorres (Valencian pronunciation: [ˈdʒesika albiˈak]; born 29 May 1979) is a Spanish journalist and politician. A member of Catalunya en Comú and formerly Podemos, she was elected to the Parliament of Catalonia in 2015. She has also led the En Comú Podem and Comuns Sumar coalitions.

== Early life and education ==
Jéssica Albiach was born in Valencia. She studied journalism at CEU Cardinal Herrera University. Albiach had a six-month Erasmus stint at KU Leuven in Belgium. Soon after, she studied photography and took a course in Anthropology at the National University of Distance Education, which she did not finish. She moved to Prague to dedicate herself to photography, and on returning, she taught the Catalan language to immigrants for Caritas Internationalis.

== Career ==
Albiach was seventh on the list of Catalunya Sí que es Pot, a Podemos-led electoral coalition, in the Barcelona constituency during the 2015 Catalan regional election. She was one of 11 deputies elected by the coalition to the Parliament of Catalonia, becoming its fourth power. In October 2015, Albiach was chosen as one of two spokespeople for En Comú Podem ahead of national elections in December.

In the 2017 Catalan regional election, Catalunya en Comú–Podem ran with Xavier Domènech in first and Albiach in third for the Barcelona constituency. The group lost three seats, ending up with eight in parliament, and fell to being the fifth largest force. In September 2018, after the exit of Domènech, Albiach was elected as En Comú Podem's leader in the Catalan parliament.

On 27 February 2020, Albiach received the backing of mayor of Barcelona Ada Colau to lead the party in the 2021 Catalan election. It retained its eight seats, with a drop in percentage of vote and going from the fifth to sixth largest group in the parliament. Albiach called for a three-party left-wing government with the Socialists' Party of Catalonia (PSC) and the Republican Left of Catalonia (ERC). She ended negotiations with the ERC as the latter would not write off a deal with Junts.

On 5 December 2023, Albiach quit Podemos, as the party had separated from Catalunya en Comú, making joint membership impossible.

In the 2024 Catalan regional election, Albiach led Comuns Sumar, who fell from eight to six seats. Her party cast the crucial votes that installed Salvador Illa of the PSC as President of the Government of Catalonia, signing a deal to increase social housing and tram networks, as well as stop a large Hard Rock Cafe casino from being built.

== Political views ==
Albiach has criticised unilateral measures by the Catalan independence movement, such as the 2017 independence referendum, as being counter-productive for the movement. She proposes a regulated referendum as the solution to the debate.

In June 2020, during the George Floyd protests, Albiach supported the removal of the Monument to Christopher Columbus in Barcelona, saying that "we have nothing to celebrate on 12 October (Spain's national day, based on the date of Columbus's arrival in the Americas)".

In the 2021 regional election campaign, Albiach proposed further devolution of power to Catalonia, including in the sectors of housing, railways, immigration, and dialogue with the European Union.
