= Jaume Asens =

Spanish politician (born 1972)

Jaume Asens MEP
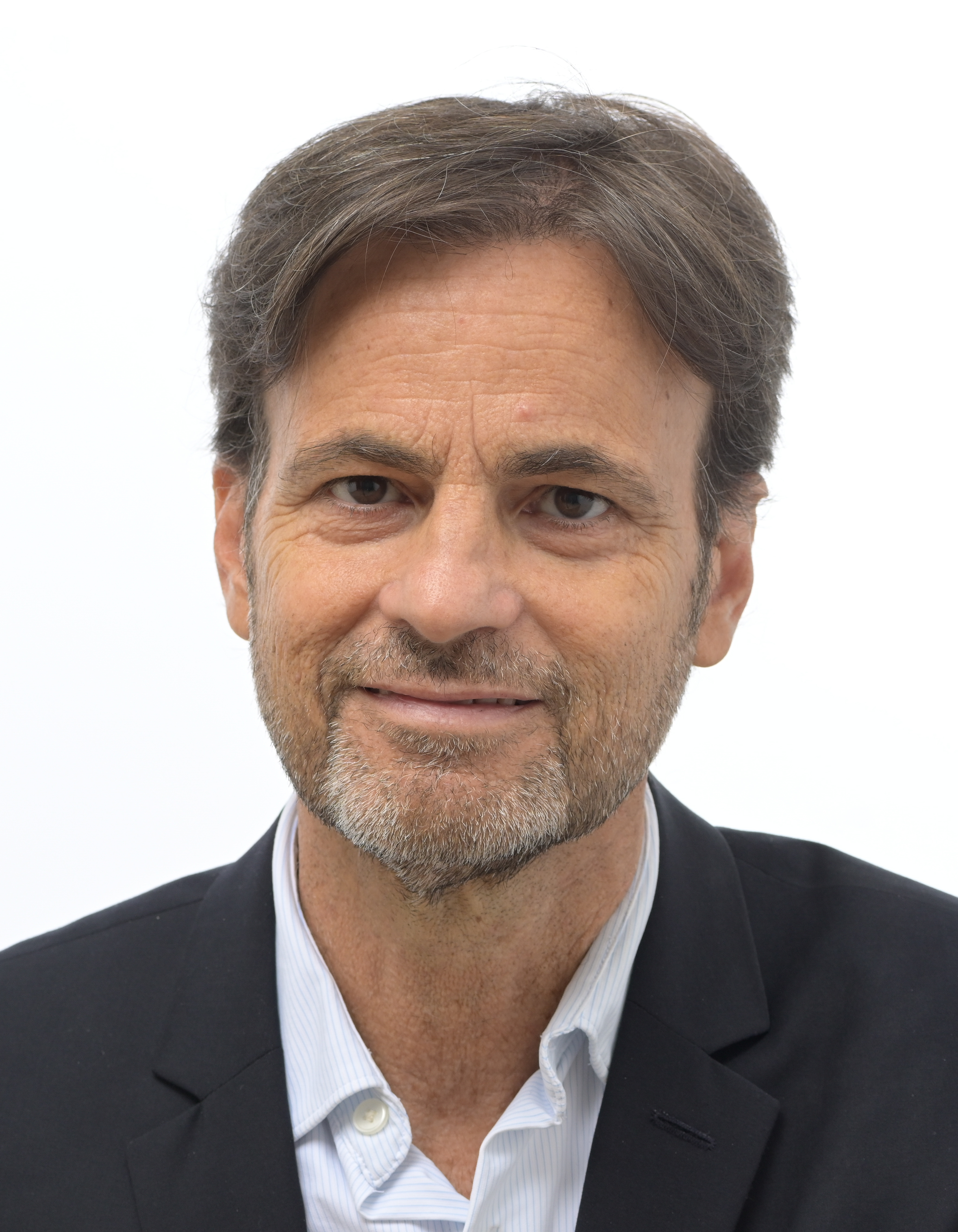
- Asens in 2024

Member of the European Parliament
- Incumbent
- Assumed office 16 July 2024
- Constituency: Spain

Member of the Congress of Deputies
- In office 21 May 2019 – 17 August 2023
- Constituency: Barcelona

Member of the Barcelona City Council
- In office 13 June 2015 – 15 June 2019

Personal details
- Born: Jaume Asens Llodrà; 29 March 1972 (age 54)
- Party: Barcelona en Comú (since 2014); Catalunya en Comú (since 2017)
- Other political affiliations: European Green Party

Jaume Asens i Llodrà (Catalan pronunciation: [ˈʒawmə əˈsɛns]; born 29 March 1972) is a Spanish politician of Catalunya en Comú who was elected member of the European Parliament in 2024.

Asens was a co-founder of Barcelona en Comú, and served as a deputy mayor of Barcelona under Ada Colau. He was the lead candidate of En Comú Podem for the Barcelona constituency in the 2019 general elections, and was elected to the Congress of Deputies. In 2020 he succeeded Pablo Iglesias Turrión as president of the Unidas Podemos parliamentary group, and served until 2023 when he chose not to run for re-election to the chamber.
