= Catalunya en Comú–Podem =

Catalonia in Common–We Can Catalunya en Comú–Podem
- Abbreviation: CatComú–Podem, CatECP
- Leader: Ada Colau
- Spokesperson: Jéssica Albiach
- Founded: 13 November 2017
- Dissolved: 28 December 2020
- Preceded by: Catalunya Sí que es Pot
- Succeeded by: En Comú Podem
- Headquarters: C/ Or, 44, 3º-2ª 08012, Barcelona
- Ideology: Eco-socialism; Alter-globalization; Left-wing populism Republicanism; Democratic socialism
- Political position: Left-wing
- Members: See list of members

Website
- catalunyaencomupodem.cat

Catalunya en Comú–Podem (English: "Catalonia in Common–We Can", CatComú–Podem), alternatively spelled out as Catalunya–En Comú Podem (English: "Catalonia–In Common We Can", CatECP), was a left-wing and self-governance electoral and parliamentary alliance in Catalonia formed by Catalunya en Comú and Podem ahead of the 2017 Catalan regional election. It was the successor of the 2015 Catalunya Sí que es Pot alliance, and its leading candidate was Xavier Domènech.

Ahead of the 2019 Spanish general election, the alliance was maintained recovering the En Comú Podem−Guanyem el Canvi label (English: "In Common We Can−Let's Win Change") which had been used by the previous "En Comú Podem" alliance in the 2016 general election. The label was maintained for Unidas Podemos Cambiar Europa's lists in the four Catalan provinces for the 2019 European Parliament election, where it scored 8.4% of the vote. By the time of the 2021 Catalan regional election, the CatComú–Podem format was fully discarded in favour of the "En Comú Podem" brand.

== History ==
The foundation congress of the Catalunya en Comú (CatComú) party that was to serve as the permanent umbrella platform for Barcelona en Comú (BComú), Initiative for Catalonia Greens (ICV), United and Alternative Left (EUiA), Equo and Podem had seen the latter ultimately not joining, over regional Podem secretary-general Albano Dante Fachin's concerns on the voting system selected to elect the leadership team and the ideological principles that should govern the new party.

Following the events resulting from the 2017 Catalan independence referendum and the enforcement of direct rule over Catalonia, the Parliament of Catalonia was dissolved and a regional election called for 21 December. Internal divisions on the referendum issue had internally shattered Catalunya Sí que es Pot, the confluence which—without BComú—had represented the political space of ICV, EUiA, Podem and Equo in parliament since 2015, and which ahead of the December election had fallen out of favour to a prospective alliance between CatComú and Podem, favoured by the former and Podemos's national leadership. This was opposed by Dante Fachin, who had voiced his support for a "common strategy" and engaging in talks with the parties that had backed the 1 October referendum, leading to his disavowal by Podemos leader Pablo Iglesias, who overrode the former's powers and called an internal vote to gather the support of party members to the alliance with CatComú. The result of the vote, with members backing the alliance by a 72–28% margin on a 60% turnout, led to the establishment of "Catalunya en Comú–Podem" with Xavier Domènech—En Comú Podem's spokesperson in the Congress of Deputies—as its leading candidate, while forcing the resignation of Dante Fachin as Podem leader, who subsequently left the party and went on to form the Som Alternativa platform.

== Composition ==
Party
Catalonia in Common (CatComú)
We Can (Podemos/Podem)

== Electoral performance ==
=== Parliament of Catalonia ===
Parliament of Catalonia
Election	Leading candidate	Votes	%	Seats	Gov.
2017	Xavier Domènech	326,360	7.5 (#5)	8 / 135	No

=== European Parliament ===
European Parliament
Election	Leading candidate	Votes	%	Seats	EP Group
2019	María Eugenia Rodríguez Palop	Within UPCE		1 / 59	Greens/EFA
