= Candela López =

Spanish politician (born 1985)

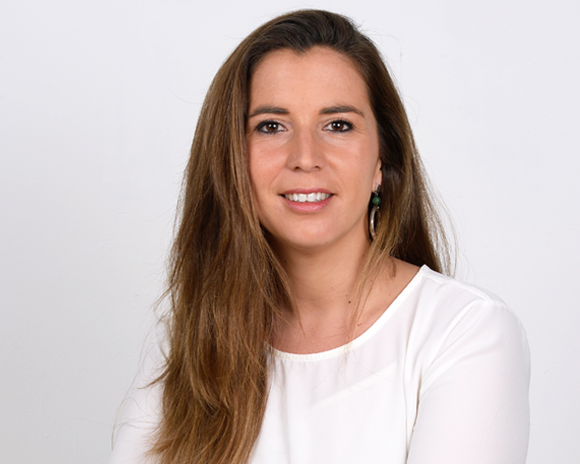
- López in 2015

Member of the Congress of Deputies
- Incumbent
- Assumed office 30 January 2024
- Preceded by: Lilith Verstrynge
- Constituency: Barcelona

Personal details
- Born: 29 May 1985 (age 41)
- Party: Catalunya en Comú

Candela López Tagliafico (born 29 May 1985) is an Argentine-born Spanish politician serving as a member of the Congress of Deputies since 2024. From 2015 to 2017, she served as mayor of Castelldefels.
