= En Comú Podem =

Political coalition in Catalonia

In Common We Can En Comú Podem
- Abbreviation: ECP
- Leader: Aina Vidal; Jéssica Albiach
- Spokesperson: Jaume Asens
- Founded: 28 October 2015
- Dissolved: 27 March 2024
- Preceded by: Catalunya Sí que es Pot; Catalunya en Comú–Podem
- Succeeded by: Comuns Sumar
- Headquarters: C/ Marina, 131; 08013, Barcelona
- Youth wing: Confluència Jove
- Ideology: Democratic socialism; Eco-socialism; Regionalism
- Political position: Left-wing
- National affiliation: Podemos (2015–2016, confluence); Unidas Podemos (2016–2023, confluence); Sumar (2023–2024, confluence)
- Members: See list of members

Website
- encomupodem.cat

En Comú Podem (English: "In Common We Can", ECP) was an electoral coalition in Catalonia, originally formed in October 2015 by Podem, Barcelona en Comú, Initiative for Catalonia Greens, United and Alternative Left, and Equo, and led by the Mayor of Barcelona, Ada Colau, to contest the 2015 Spanish general election.

For the 2016 general election, it was then registered as a party under the En Comú Podem−Guanyem el Canvi label (Catalan for "In Common We Can−Let's Win Change"). Ahead of the 2019 Spanish general election, the alliance maintained its 2016 label, but was reforged as a continuation of the Catalunya en Comú–Podem alliance, the coalition of Catalunya en Comú and Podemos in the 2017 Catalan regional election. For the 2021 Catalan regional election, ran under the En Comú Podem−Podem en Comú label (English: "In Common We Can−We Can In Common"). The alliance was dissolved ahead of the 2024 Catalan regional election.

== History ==
Following the negative results of the Catalunya Sí que es Pot alliance in the 2015 Catalan regional election, Podemos, Initiative for Catalonia Greens (ICV) and United and Alternative Left (EUiA) started negotiations with Barcelona en Comú—Barcelona mayor Ada Colau's party—to form a joint list to contest the upcoming general election in Catalonia. An agreement was reached on 28 October 2015 to constitute an alliance under the "En Comú Podem" label, aiming at mirroring Colau's success in the 2015 Barcelona local election. If successful, the alliance was planned to be maintained in a permanent level ahead of future electoral contests. The candidacy was to be led into the election by historian Xavier Domènech, comprising members from Podemos, ICV, EUiA, Barcelona en Comú and Equo and featuring Colau herself in a "symbolic" position in the list for Barcelona.

Under the promise of holding a legal and binding referendum on independence if accessing the national government, En Comú Podem emerged as the largest force in Catalonia in the 20 December general election, securing 24.7% of the share and 12 seats in the Congress of Deputies. The alliance was renewed for the 2016 general election, with an unsuccessful attempt to incorporate Pirates of Catalonia into the lists despite the party having initially expressed interest in doing so. ECP maintained its status as the largest political list in Catalonia on 26 June, but fell short of achieving a landslide victory at the scale predicted by opinion polls.

ECP initially aimed at forming its own parliamentary group, separately from Podemos. However, this move was blocked by the board of the Congress of Deputies as a result of ECP being a coalition comprising Podemos—which had also contested the general election elsewhere in Spain—and due to the legal impossibility for parties "not competing each other in the election" to form separate groups, forcing ECP-elected deputies to join a "confederal" group with Podemos. In the electoral repetition of 2016, and in order to try to circumvent this legal clause, the newly-established Unidos Podemos alliance signed that it would not be running in Catalonia as ECP would stand as a political party within an "instrumental" coalition, in order to preserve its previous electoral rights. This ultimately proved to not be enough, and in July 2016, ECP renounced to form its own group and joined Unidos Podemos's one, though it would attempt to reform the Congress's regulations for them to allow the formation of such group throughout the term of the resulting parliament.

After the launching of Más País by former Podemos founder Íñigo Errejón ahead of the November 2019 Spanish general election and his announcement of a general agreement with Equo to run in alliance in a number of constituencies, including Barcelona, Equo's branch in Catalonia refused to join Errejón's lists and pledged its support to the En Comú Podem alliance.

== Composition ==
| Party | Notes |
|---|---|
| We Can (Podem) | |
| Catalonia in Common (CatComú) | Founded in April 2017. |
| Barcelona in Common (BComú) | Integrated within CatComú in April 2017. |
| Equo (Equo) | Integrated within CatComú in April 2017. |
| Initiative for Catalonia Greens (ICV) | Integrated within CatComú in April 2017, dissolved in 2019. |
| United and Alternative Left (EUiA) | Integrated within CatComú in April 2017, expelled in 2019 |

== Electoral performance ==
=== Parliament of Catalonia ===
Parliament of Catalonia
| Election | Leading candidate | Votes | % | Seats | Gov. |
| 2021 | Jéssica Albiach | 195,345 | 6.9 (#5) | 8 / 135 | No |

=== Cortes Generales ===
Cortes Generales
| Election | Catalonia | | | | | |
| Election | Congress | | | | Senate | |
| Election | Votes | % | Seats | +/– | Seats | +/– |
| 2015 | 929,880 | 24.71 (#1) | 12 / 47 | 9 (Note: Compared to ICV–EUiA totals in the 2011 general election.) | 4 / 16 | 3 |
| 2016 | 853,102 | 24.53 (#1) | 12 / 47 | 0 | 4 / 16 | 0 |
| Apr. 2019 | 615,665 | 14.85 (#3) | 7 / 48 | 5 | 0 / 16 | 4 |
| Nov. 2019 | 549,173 | 14.17 (#3) | 7 / 48 | 0 | 0 / 16 | 0 |
| 2023 | 497,617 | 14.04 (#2) | 7 / 48 | 0 | 0 / 16 | 0 |

== Symbols ==
Ballot logo in the 2015 and 2016 general elections.

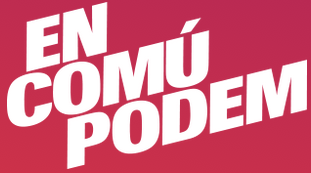
Logo from October to December 2015.

Logo from December 2015 to March 2019.

Logo from March 2019 to July 2020.

Logo from July 2020 to January 2021.

Logo from January 2021.

== See also ==
- A la valenciana
- En Marea
