= Xavier Domènech =

Spanish historian, activist, and politician (born 1974)

Xavier Domènech MP
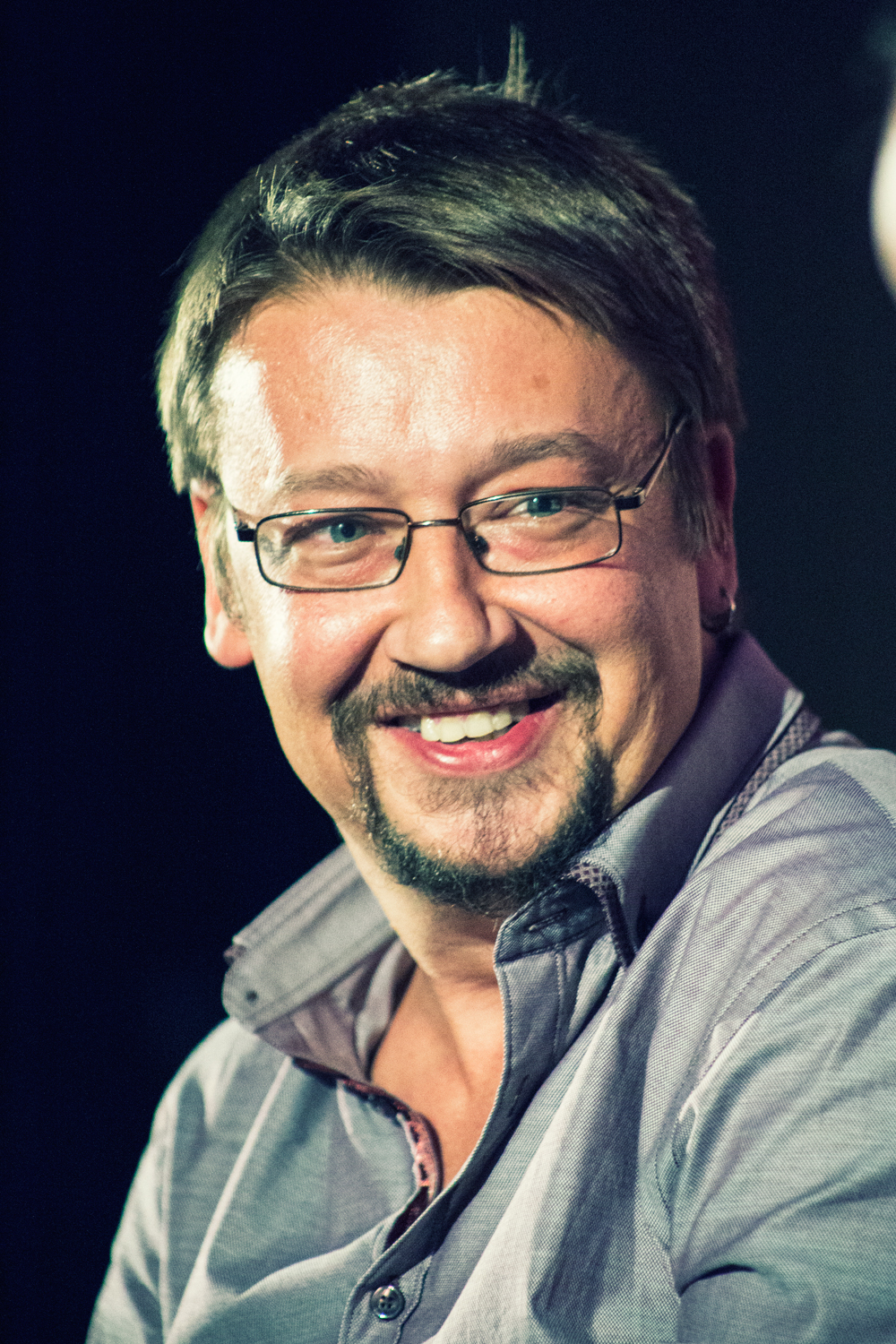

Member of the Parliament of Catalonia
- In office 17 January 2018 – 4 September 2018
- Constituency: Barcelona

Member of the Congress of Deputies
- In office 13 January 2016 – 17 January 2018
- Constituency: Barcelona

Personal details
- Born: Xavier Domènech i Sampere; 2 December 1974 (age 51) Sabadell, Spain
- Party: Podemos (since 2014); Catalunya en Comú (since 2017)
- Other political affiliations: Procés Constituent
- Occupation: politician, writer, historian, essayist

Xavier Domenech i Sampere (born 1974, Sabadell), is a Spanish historian, activist and politician based in Barcelona, Spain. He led the En Comú Podem (Together We Can) electoral ticket that stood in Catalonia at the 2015 Spanish general election on 20 December 2015.

== Career ==
Prior to 2015, Domènech was a lecturer. In June 2015, Domènech was appointed Commissioner for Strategic Studies and Historical Memory at Barcelona City Hall by the government of Barcelona en Comú. As a lecturer and programme manager, he earned an annual salary of €43,919.

Barcelona en Comú's historical memory policies under Domenech have included removing the bust of former King of Spain, Juan Carlos, from the city council chamber, and denying the use of Monjuic Castle for a service in memory of executed Nationalist supporters.

== Politics ==
Domènech is a Catalan sovereignist, an anti-nationalist, and a libertarian socialist with a Marxist outlook. He was a member of the left-wing Catalan movement Procés Constituent, which supported the left-libertarian Barcelona en Comú electoral platform, which in turn entered into coalition with Podemos to form En Comú Podem for the 2015 elections.

== Books ==
Domènech is the author of a number of history books, including Quan el carrer va deixar de ser seu. Moviment obrer, societat civil i canvi polític a Sabadell (Barcelona, 2002), Temps d'Interseccions. Una història de la Joventut Comunista de Catalunya (Barcelona, 2007), Quan plovien Bombes. La Guerra Civil i els bombardeigs de Barcelona (Barcelona 2007), Clase Obrera, antifranquismo y cambio político (2008), Lucha de clases, dictadura y democracia (1939–1977), and Political Change and the Labor Movement under Francoism. Class Struggle, Dictatorship and Democracy 1939–1977 (Madrid, 2012).

== Personal life ==
He has a partner Sònia, and a son called Drac.
