= Comuns Sumar =

Commons Unite Comuns Sumar
- Leader: Jéssica Albiach
- Founded: 29 March 2024
- Preceded by: En Comú Podem
- Ideology: Left-wing populism; Green politics; Progressivism
- Political position: Left-wing
- Colors: Carmine
- Members: See list of members
- Parliament of Catalonia: 6 / 135

Comuns Sumar (English: Commons Unite) is a Catalan-based electoral alliance formed by Catalunya en Comú, Barcelona in Common and Movimiento Sumar ahead of the 2024 Catalan regional election.

== Composition ==
Party
Catalonia In Common (CatComú)
Barcelona in Common (BComú)
Unite Movement (MS)

== Electoral performance ==
Parliament of Catalonia
Election	Leading candidate	Votes	%	Seats	+/–	Government
2024	Jéssica Albiach	181,795	5.80 (#6)	6 / 135	2 (Note: Compared to En Comú Podem totals in the 2021 regional election.)	Confidence and supply
