= Catalunya en Comú =

Catalonia in Common Catalunya en Comú
- Abbreviation: CatComú, Comuns
- Coordinator-National: Ada Colau; Jéssica Albiach; Candela López
- Founder: Ada Colau
- Founded: 19 December 2016
- Headquarters: C/ Or, 44, 3º-2ª 08012, Barcelona
- Youth wing: Joves Ecosocialistes
- Ideology: Green politics; Left-wing populism; Progressivism; Catalanism
- Political position: Centre-left to Left-wing
- National affiliation: Unidas Podemos (2016–2023); Sumar (since 2023); Broad Front (since 2026)
- Regional affiliation: En Comú Podem (2016–2024); Catalunya en Comú–Podem (2017–2020); Comuns Sumar (since 2024)
- European affiliation: European Green Party (associate member)
- European Parliament group: Greens/EFA
- International affiliation: Progressive International
- Members: See list of members
- European Parliament (Spanish seats): 1 / 61
- Congress of Deputies (Catalan seats): 6 / 48
- Spanish Senate (Catalan seats): 0 / 23
- Parliament of Catalonia: 5 / 135
- Mayors: 8 / 946
- Town councillors: 244 / 9,077

Website
- comuns.cat

Catalunya en Comú (English: "Catalonia in Common", CatComú), previously Un País en Comú (English: "A Country in Common") and collectively dubbed as Comuns (English: Commons), is a Catalan-based political party established in December 2016 as an umbrella for Barcelona en Comú, Initiative for Catalonia Greens (ICV), United and Alternative Left (EUiA) and Equo, which until then had been collaborating through electoral alliances under the Catalunya Sí que es Pot and En Comú Podem labels in the September 2015 regional and December 2015 and June 2016 general elections.

Its spokesman until 2018 was En Comú Podem's spokesperson in the Congress of Deputies, Xavier Domènech, with the new party being sponsored by Mayor of Barcelona Ada Colau. It contested the 2017 Catalan regional election under the Catalunya en Comú–Podem label, in coalition with Podemos, then joined the En Comú Podem alliance ahead of the April and November 2019 Spanish general elections.

== History ==
The first steps for constituting the political space previously represented by the Catalunya Sí que es Pot and En Comú Podem alliances into a permanent political party can be traced to January 2016, when the party's trademark was provisionally registered in the interior ministry and Mayor of Barcelona Ada Colau announced her intention of establishing her own, autonomous party separate from Podemos. On 19 December 2016, the "Un País en Comú" (English: "A Country in Common") platform was launched with the aim of constituting the political space previously represented by the Catalunya Sí que es Pot and En Comú Podem alliances into a permanent political party.

The platform's establishment had been supported by Initiative for Catalonia Greens (ICV), United and Alternative Left (EUiA), Barcelona en Comú and Equo, with it holding its first public event on 29 January 2017 in Barcelona, and the party's founding congress on 8 April. Organizational disagreements in March over the voting system selected to elect the leadership team and the ideological principles that should govern the new platform had seen regional Podemos/Podem leader, Albano Dante Fachin, opting out of the founding congress at the last moment, promising future collaboration with the other constituent parties but rejecting to integrate Podem into the new party. Despite this, several Podem members disaffected with Fachin's leadership, such as Jéssica Albiach o Marc Bertomeu, did join the new party on their own accord.

The definitive name of the party was to be chosen in a voting among party members following the founding assembly, with several proposals being registered in advance to prevent a similar case as what happened to the "Guanyem" trademark in 2014: Catalunya en Comú (Catalan for "Catalonia in Common"), En Comú Podem ("In Common We Can"), En Comú ("In Common") or Comuns ("Commons"). In a final voting held on 22 May 2017, name "Catalunya en Comú" was picked by party members over "En Comú Podem" in a 54–46% vote.

== Ideology ==
Catalunya en Comú is considered to be a democratic socialist party with an emphasis on social equality, strengthening of the welfare state, expansive fiscal policy and in favor of degrowth and redistributive measures. As a merger of several parties, they come from a eurocommunist, left-wing ecologist and anti-austerity tradition. They have their main political hold in the city of Barcelona and its metro area, and therefore they hold strong municipalist stances and tend to focus on urban issues. The party is a strong supporter of feminism, environmentalism, LGBTQ+ rights, immigration and the fight against racism and colonialism. Given this, they are considered anti-fascist and are strong supporters of the Palestinian cause. They are pro-european, but they are critical of the Union's more neoliberal stances.

Catalunya en Comú is a catalanist party and therefore defends the status of Catalonia as a nation, is in favor of further devolution to the Catalan government and advocates for a Catalan-favoring language policy. The party, however, is considered to not be either pro-independence nor anti-independence, often classified as "other", leaving the issue up to the individual members and supporters. Mostly, both its leaders and voting base are in favor of Catalan statehood but not full separation from Spain and propose a federalist or confederalist relationship with the rest of Spain. Despite this, significant leaders and close to 25% of voters are pro-independence. The party, nevertheless, does openly support the celebration of an independence referendum.

== Composition ==
=== Current members ===
Party	Notes
Barcelona in Common (BComú)	
Greens Equo (VQ)	
United Left Catalonia (EUCat)	Founded in July 2019.
Green Left (EV)	Founded in March 2021.

=== Former members ===
Party	Notes
Podem (Podemos/Podem)	Left in 2017.
Initiative for Catalonia Greens (ICV)	Dissolved in 2019.
United and Alternative Left (EUiA)	Expelled in 2019.

== Electoral performance ==
=== Parliament of Catalonia ===
Parliament of Catalonia
Election	Votes	%	#	Seats	+/–	Leading candidate	Status in legislature
2017	Within CatComú–Podem			5 / 135	1 (Note: Compared to Initiative for Catalonia Greens and United and Alternative Left totals (within Catalunya Sí que es Pot) in the 2015 regional election.)	Xavier Domènech	Opposition
2021	Within ECP-PEC			6 / 135	1	Jéssica Albiach	Opposition
2024	Within Comuns Sumar			5 / 135	1	Jéssica Albiach	Confidence and supply

=== Cortes Generales ===
Cortes Generales
Election	Catalonia						
Election	Congress					Senate	
Election	Votes	%	#	Seats	+/–	Seats	+/–
2019 (Apr)	Within ECP–GeC			5 / 48	4 (Note: Compared to Barcelona en Comú, Initiative for Catalonia Greens and United and Alternative Left totals (within En Comú Podem) in the 2016 general election.)	0 / 16	2
2019 (Nov)	Within ECP–GeC			5 / 48	0	0 / 16	0
2023	Within Sumar–ECP			5 / 48	0	0 / 16	0

=== European Parliament ===
European Parliament
Election	Leading candidate	Votes	%	#	Seats	+/–	EP Group
2019	Ernest Urtasun	Within UPCE			1 / 59	1	Greens/EFA
2024	Jaume Asens	Within Sumar			1 / 61	0	Greens/EFA

== Symbols ==
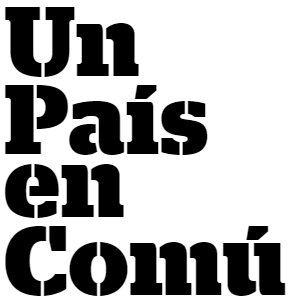
Logo from December 2016 to June 2017.

Logo from June 2017 to November 2021.

Logo from November 2021 to April 2 2024.

Logo from April 2 2024 to April 5 2024.

Logo from April 5 2024 to present.
