= Barcelona en Comú =

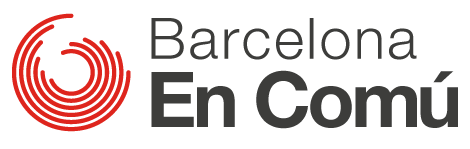
- Spokesperson: Ada Colau
- Founded: 2014
- Merger of: Podem; ICV; EUiA; Procés Constituent; Equo
- Headquarters: Barcelona
- Ideology: Left-wing populism Participatory democracy
- Political position: Left-wing
- Regional affiliation: En Comú Podem (2015–2024) (Note: Since 2017 integrated within Catalunya en Comú); Catalunya en Comú (since 2017)
- Barcelona City Council: 9 / 41

Website
- barcelonaencomu.cat

Barcelona en Comú (Catalan for "Barcelona in Common") is a political party launched initially as a grouping of electors in June 2014. Its policy agenda includes defending social justice and community rights, promoting participatory democracy, introducing mechanisms to tackle corruption, and developing a new model of tourism for Barcelona.

== Membership of Barcelona en Comú ==
Many of the platform's founding members had been active for many years in social and political movements in Barcelona, including the Platform for People Affected by Mortgages (PAH) and 15M.

The spokespeople of Barcelona en Comú include former anti-evictions activist Ada Colau, Jaume Asens (lawyer), Gerardo Pisarello (constitutional law scholar), Gala Pin (social activist), and Joan Subirats (political scientist). Ada Colau has appeared in national polls as a popular alternative to current elected representatives in Spain, and has since been nominated as the platform's candidate for and elected as the mayor of Barcelona.

== History ==
The platform has its origins in the new social and political movements that emerged in the wake of the Spanish economic crisis and the 15M protests.

=== Launch and validation ===
Over 2000 people attended the launch of the initiative at a public meeting at the Collasso i Gil school in the Raval neighbourhood of Barcelona on 26 June 2014. The platform launched a validation process in order to assess the level of support among Barcelona residents for its proposal of creating a united progressive electoral list to stand at the 2015 municipal elections. It set itself the target of collecting 30,000 signatures of support for its initial manifesto by September 2014. As part of the validation process, it also held a series of 'neighbourhood chats' across the city.

=== Code of political ethics ===
Barcelona en Comú's Code of Political Ethics applies to all individuals and parties standing for election under the platform's name. It was drawn up using a participatory methodology consisting of two days of open debate on 10–11 October 2014, and an online platform where the proposed document was open to comments and amendments.

=== Electoral list ===
From its launch, Barcelona en Comú entered into discussions with local political parties including the Citizen Network X Party, Podemos Barcelona, ICV-EUiA, Procés Constituent, Equo, and the Trobada Popular Municipalista of the CUP to explore the possibility of creating a joint electoral list at the 2015 Barcelona elections. At its first party congress on 18–19 October, Podemos made official its decision not to stand directly in the 2015 municipal elections in Spain and to support local citizen candidacies, including Guanyem Barcelona. On 22 November 2014, the Trobada Popular Municipalista decided not to join the Guanyem platform due to disagreements over salary limits for elected representatives. The following day, Procés Constituent confirmed its participation in the Guanyem candidacy. On 6 February 2015, members of Podemos in Barcelona voted 91% in favour of joining the candidacy.

=== Conflict over 'Guanyem Barcelona' ===
Having achieved the 30,000 target of signatures of support for the Guanyem Barcelona initiative, on 28 August 2014, representatives of the platform applied to register the name 'Guanyem Barcelona' as a political party with the Spanish Interior Ministry. They were informed that the party 'Guanyem Barcelona' had been registered two days previously by Julià de Fabià, a city councilor of Santa Maria de Palautordera. In November, Fabià requested a meeting with the platform in which he offered to give up the registration in exchange for a role in the coordination of all of the Guanyem platforms across Spain, a proposal which the platform rejected and denounced as blackmail. In their communications with the Interior Ministry, members of Guanyem Barcelona pointed to their pre-existing registration of 'Guanyem' as a political party with a public notary on 13 August 2014, and the false address given by Fabià in his registration of the name with the Ministry. The Interior Ministry rejected these appeals, upholding the registration of the party by Fabià, and obliging Guanyem to stand under a new name. On 10 of February, the platform announced its intention to stand as Barcelona en Comú.

=== The Pujol case ===
On 2 September 2014, Guanyem Barcelona initiated legal action against the family of the ex-Catalan President, Jordi Pujol, with the Spanish political party Podemos and for alleged tax evasion and corruption.

Guanyem and Podemos claim that: "The Pujol Ferrusola family has, since the transition to democracy in Spain, been part of a business scheme that has worked in the interests of the family and companies close to them... It enjoyed impunity as long as Jordi Pujol has continued to support the parties of the current ruling regime (the Popular Party and the Spanish Socialist Party) as they rotate in and out of government. This is demonstrated by the shutting down of the preliminary investigation into the Banca Catalana and by the claims by the former anti-corruption prosecutor, Carlos Jiménez Villarejo, that he was ordered not to investigate Pujol by the Socialist Party".

== Electoral performance ==
=== Barcelona City Council ===
Barcelona City Council
Election	Leading candidate	Votes	%	Seats	+/–	Government
2015	Ada Colau	176,612	25.21 (#1)	11 / 41	6 (Note: Compared to Initiative for Catalonia Greens–EUiA–Agreement totals in the 2011 Barcelona City Council election.)	Government
2019	Ada Colau	156,493	20.74 (#2)	10 / 41	▼1	Government
2023	Ada Colau	131,594	19.8 (#3)	9 / 41	▼1	Confidence and supply

== Other Guanyems ==
Since its launch, 'Guanyem/Ganemos' ('Let's win...') movements have been set up in a number of other Spanish cities, including Madrid, Malaga, Terrassa, Hospitalet and Seville. None of these other platforms are officially affiliated with Guanyem Barcelona, however, Guanyem Barcelona has published a 'Handy Guide to Setting Up a Guanyem' that explains the basic political and organizational principles by which any citizen platform which wishes to adopt its name should abide.

== See also ==
- Plataforma de Afectados por la Hipoteca
