= El hijo de la Africana =

Pau Guix's book

El hijo de la africana: Reflexiones de un catalán libre de nacionalismo
- First edition
- Author: Pau Guix
- Publisher: Ediciones Hildy S.L.
- ISBN: 978-84-947019-2-4

El hijo de la Africana is a book written by Pau Guix which collects his articles written for the digital news paper Crónica Global, Economía Digital, elCatalán.es and katoikos.eu in the years 2014–2017. These articles explain the point of view of Pau Guix regarding catalan nationalism and independentism. They use arguments against catalanism and catalan independentism intellectual basis considering both of them of supremacist nature. The book was presented on April 5, 2018 in Societat Civil Catalana headquarters with the presence of Pau Guix, José Rosiñol, Josep Ramon Bosch, Sergio Fidalgo and Juan Arza.

Pau Guix states he selected the title of the book to denounce being called "son of the African" by some people in Vic due to his mother being natural of the south of Spain.

The book has a prologue written by Antonio Robles, Augusto Ferrer-Dalmau, Dolça Catalunya, Dolores Agenjo, Félix Ovejero, Joan Ferran, José Rosiñol, Josep Ramon Bosch, Juan Arza, Manel Manchón, Miquel Escudero, Miquel Porta Perales, Miriam Tey, Pablo Planas, Ramón de España, Sergio Fidalgo, Sergio Sanz and Teresa Freixes. The cover is an illustration ceded by the painter Augusto Ferrer-Dalmau.

== See also ==
- Societat Civil Catalana
- Somatemps
- Tabarnia
