= José Domingo Domingo =

José Domingo Domingo (born March 3, 1959, in Barcelona) is a politician and Catalan lawyer, a member of the Parliament of Catalonia in the eighth term.

== Biography ==
He was born in the neighborhood of Verdum. A sympathizer of the Labor Party of Spain in his youth, he graduated in Law from the Autonomous University of Barcelona in 1981 and has been a Social Security lawyer since 1989. In 2000, he was elected president of the Professional Association from the Department of Social Security Administration (APLASS), a post he held until 2006. He has also been part of the Boards of Directors of the Spanish Association of Health and Social Security (AESSS) and of the Federation of Superior Bodies of the Civil Administration of the State (FEDECA).

In 1995 he joined the Association for the Tolerance of Barcelona, from which he was elected vice president and coordinated different initiatives, such as the Tolerance Magazine, the legal section of the Association and the Tolerance Film Cycle. In 2006 he resigned the vice president of the entity to devote himself entirely to political activity.

Since 2005, from the group that promoted the platform (and later association) Ciutadans de Catalunya, he participated in the creation of the Ciutadans-Partit de la Ciutadania (C's) party, as part of the first Executive Committee elected to the Founding Congress of C's, in July 2006 and being the most voted candidate for the General Council of the party at the II National Congress of C's (2007).

In the elections to the 2006 Parliament of Catalonia, he was elected deputy for the province of Barcelona in the list of C's, being assigned to the Mixed Group, of which he was Deputy Spokesman. He was a member of the executive committee of Citizens and wrote part of the appeal of unconstitutionality (admitted to proceeding) that was presented, on behalf of the party, against the Statute of Autonomy of Catalonia of 2006.

In May 2009, he renounced Citizens' militancy by the pact of this political force with the Libertas formation, under which both organizations co-opted to the European elections headed by Miguel Durán, considering that this agreement broke with the fundamental principles that gave birth to C's. Although he was speculated about his possible admission to another formation, he remained at his seat as a non-attached autonomous deputy until the end of the legislature and abandoned the active politics, resigning to concur to the elections and returning to associative activism.

Since then, he has been the president of the Civic Impulse Civic Association, which he promoted and founded in October 2009. His activity has been highlighted by the denunciation and questioning, both social and legal, of the linguistic politics promoted by the Generalitat de Catalunya (including linguistic immersion or the lettering regulations in Catalan), as well as the promotion of unitary civic platforms against Catalan nationalism and in defense of plurality and constitutional values in Catalonia. This thesis is aligned with Spanish nationalists which state that education in Catalonia is being used to indoctrinate children into Catalan nationalism.

In October 2013 he was one of the organizers of the "Som Catalunya, Som Espanya" concentration. Member linked to the Catalan Civil Society, he was the founder of another unionist platform called Spain and Catalans. He has collaborated in social gatherings of various media, such as El matí de Catalunya Ràdio. He has participated in events of Somatemps.
