= Josep Alsina =

Spanish activist (born 1954)

José Alsina Calvés (born in Ripoll, 1954), is an activist for Spanish Nationalism. Former president of far-right organisation Somatemps and director of the magazine Nihil Obstat. He also was one of the founders of Catalan Civil Society (SCC, Societat Civil Catalana).

He has graduated in biology at University of Barcelona, did a Master's degree in History of Sciences and obtained a PhD in philosophy at Autonomous University of Barcelona. He has worked as a secondary school teacher of Natural Sciences. Other intellectual work involves publications related to Natural History, biotechnology, philosophy and politics.

In 2015 José Alsina participated in a debate at Catalunya Ràdio with Jordi Borràs. In the debate Josep Alsina's ideology and activism are discussed as well as Borràs investigation tasks.

In 2016 he received the award Ramiro de Maeztu.

In May 2018 he received the award Pascual Tamburri Bariain to the best short essay, given by the publication Revista Razón Española and Asociación Cultural Ruta Norte.

== Politics ==
At the age of 17 he entered the neo-Nazi NSSP, the National Socialist Spanish Party (Partido Español Nacional Socialista in Spanish, PENS). Later on he left for New Force (Fuerza Nueva in Spanish). After New Force he entered the MSR and SyL. Around 2011 - 2013 he joined Somatemps. At the same time he contributed to the foundation Catalan Civil Society but left it shortly after. As part of his focus on nationalism he directs the far-right publication Nihil Obstat.

His political claims revolve around the hispanity of Catalonia. He considers himself as hispanist, not constitutionalist. He describes the concept of hispanist as the person who believes in a Spain formed by a single political entity, which opposes the multiple nationalities and political entities of Spain developed through the centuries in the Iberian Peninsula:

In the hispanist version, which is the one we (Somatemps) defend, Spain is a single political nation, heir of a previous structure, the Hispanic Empire

— Josep Alsina

He also defends the theory of indoctrination into Catalan nationalism through the Catalan education system ("adoctrinamiento" in Castilian Spanish), theory supported by right-wing parties and associations of Spain. However, social studies do not find causality between children national identification and educational system.
