= Xavier Codorniu =

Spanish politician

Luis Javier Muñoz Codorniu (born in Barcelona, 1946), also known as Xavier Codorniu, is the secretary of Somatemps, a founder of Societat Civil Catalana (Catalan Civil Society) and president of Monarchical National Union of Spain.

He has been in People's Party of Catalonia (PP/PPC) electoral lists of 2007 and 2011 Catalonia local elections. Currently he is devoted to spanish nationalism activism and his own business. He postulates that Catalonia's language immersion education creates a conflict, citing personal experiences with migrants out of Spain asking why they have to learn Catalan if people speak Spanish. Additionally he believes that through the years children have been indoctrinated into Catalan nationalism in the schools, creating an education atmosphere of malinchism. As part of his activism, he has been involved in rallies against Catalan nationalist political parties, including one in front of Republican Left of Catalonia headquarters screaming the Francoist motto "Una, Grande y Libre".
