= Jordi Borràs i Abelló =

Catalan illustrator and photojournalist

Jordi Borràs
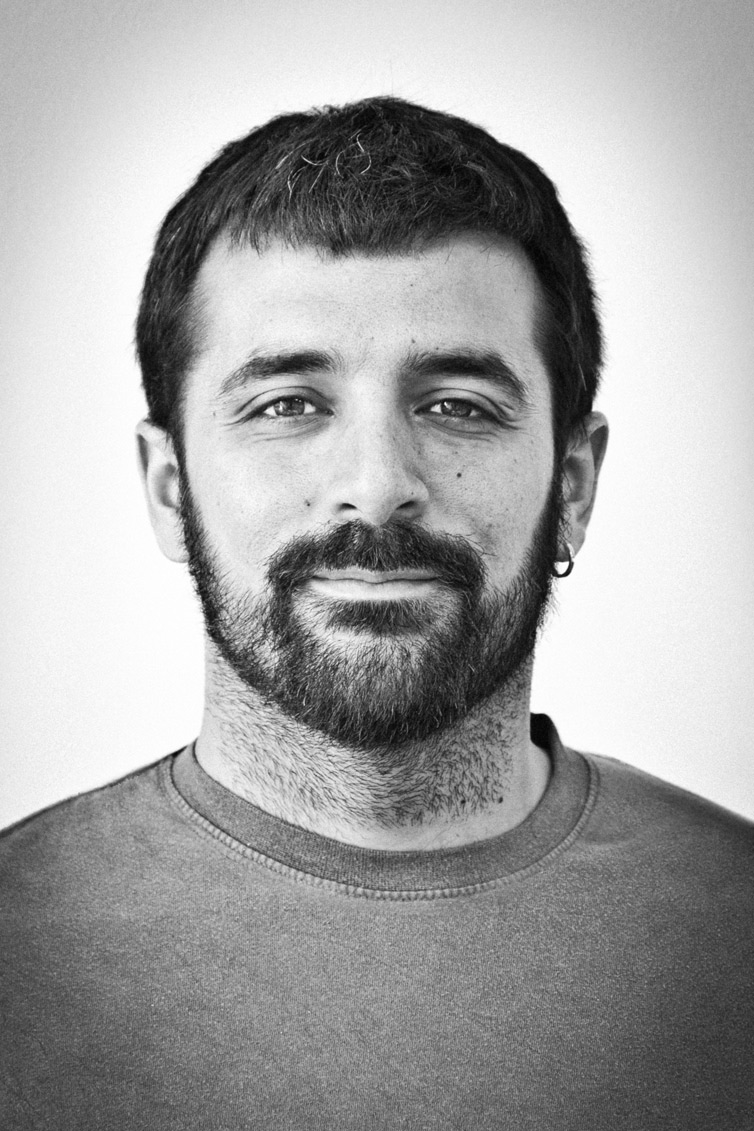
- Born: 1981 (age 43–44); Barcelona
- Known for: photojournalist specializing in far-right movements
- Notable work: Dies que duraran anys (Ara llibres, 2018)

Jordi Borràs i Abelló (1981, Barcelona) is a Catalan illustrator and photojournalist with an expertise in the far-right and neonazi movements from all over Europe.

== Biography ==
Borràs has a degree in Illustration from Barcelona's Massana School of Design, where he also discovered an interest in photography. Since then, he combines both disciplines professionally and has specialized in social issues in the field of photojournalism. He is a member of the Group of Journalists Ramon Barnils.

He has worked as an independent graphic reporter for various Catalan media including Nació Digital, La Directa, or El Temps, where he has also published several research pieces. He currently collaborates with El Crític, El Món and the Basque magazine Argia. He has specialized in social photo chronicles with a special interest in the extreme right that is active in Catalonia. Internationally, he has published photographs in several newspapers and international agencies and also in magazines specialized in the extreme right Hope Not Hate and Expo, as well as in the rest of Spain.

Since he began reporting, Borràs started to receive threats from fascist groups in 2013, which the police investigated.

In the field of photography, the edition of his first book, Warcelona, una història de violència (Polen Edicions, 2013) (War-celona, a history of violence). On 22 April 2015 he presented Plus Ultra. A graphic chronicle of Spanishism in Catalonia (Polen Edicions, 2015). In September 2015 he published the book Desmuntant Societat Civil Catalana (Saldonar, 2015) where he reveals the origins of and demonstrate the links of the group Societat Civil Catalana with the extreme right of Somatemps and other groups through various research reports.

In 2018 he presented Dies que duraran anys (Days that will last years) a book of photos from the Catalan Independence referendum of 1 October 2017. It was the second best-selling non-fiction book during the Sant Jordi Day book festival that same year.

In July 2018 he was attacked in the center of Barcelona by an off-duty police officer. The off-duty police officer claimed that Borràs started the fight with the police officer. Testimonials support Jordi Borràs explanation of facts. In January 2021 the police officer was sentenced to one year in prison for ideological assault against the Catalan journalist. In January 2022 the policeman was sentenced to one year in prison, a fine and a restraining order after admitting that the assault was ideologically motivated.

== Books ==
- Warcelona: Una història de violència (Pol·len edicions, 2013)
- Desmuntant Societat Civil Catalana (Edicions Saldonar, 2015)
- Plus Ultra: Una crònica gràfica de l'espanyolisme a Catalunya (Pol·len Edicions, 2015)
- La cara B del procés (Pagès Editors 2016)
- Dies que duraran anys (Ara Llibres, 2018)

== Awards ==
In 2016 he received Dignity Prize from The Dignity Commission Foundation, a catalan civil society organization.
