= Codorniu (surname) =

Codorniu is a surname. Notable people with the surname include:

- Juan Hidalgo Codorniu (1927–2018), Spanish composer, poet, and artist
- Manuel Codorniu (1788–1857), Spanish physician, educator, and politician
- Xavier Codorniu (born 1946), Spanish politician
