= Sabadell =

- Municipality
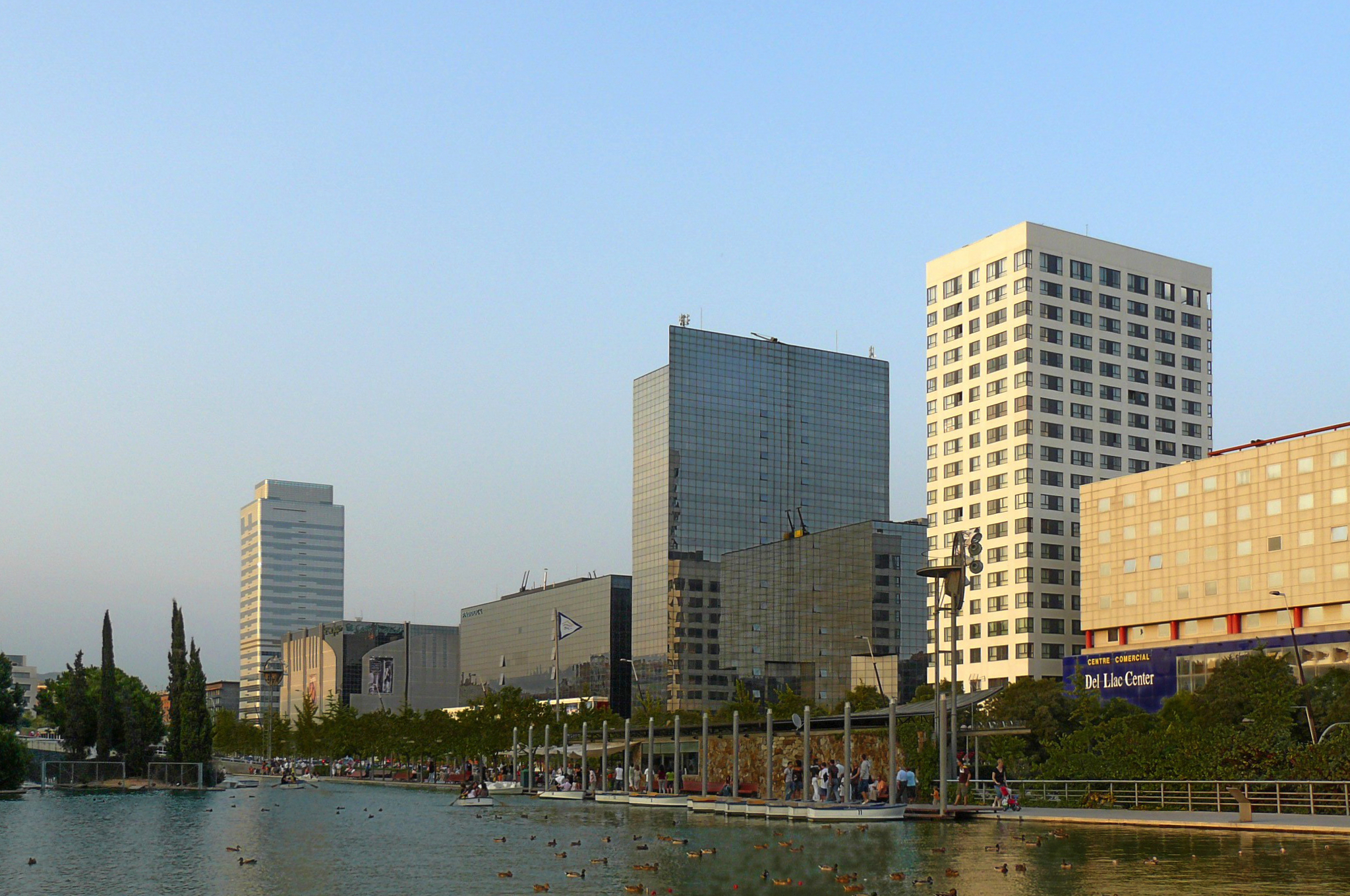
- Eix Macià business district

- Flag Coat of arms
- Location of Sabadell
- Location in Vallès Occidental county

- Location within Catalonia Location within Spain
- Coordinates: 41°32′51″N 2°6′32″E
- Country: Spain
- Autonomous community: Catalonia
- Province: Barcelona
- Comarca: Vallès Occidental

Government
  - Type: Ayuntamiento
  - Body: Ajuntament de Sabadell
  - Mayor: Marta Farrés (2019) (PSC)

Area
  - Total: 37.63 km^{2} (14.53 sq mi)
- Elevation: 190 m (620 ft)

Population (2025)
  - Total: 224,589
  - Density: 5,968/km^{2} (15,460/sq mi)
- Demonym(s): Sabadellenc, sabadellenca, sabadellense
- Time zone: UTC+1 (CET)
  - Summer (DST): UTC+2 (CEST)
- Postal code: 08200 to 08208 and 08805
- Website: sabadell.cat

Sabadell (Note: Pronunciation of Sabadell: Catalan: [səβəˈðeʎ] Spanish: [saβaˈðel]) is a city and municipality in the autonomous community of Catalonia in Spain. It is in the south of the comarca of Vallès Occidental, where it is one of the two capitals, the other being Terrassa. It is located on the River Ripoll, 20 km (12 mi) north of Barcelona, 190 m (620 ft) above sea level. With a population of 224,589, it is the 5th-largest city in Catalonia and the 23rd-largest in Spain.

Sabadell pioneered the Industrial Revolution in Catalonia with its textile mills, together with its archrival Terrassa. Thus, in the mid-19th century, it became the most important wool city in Spain, being nicknamed the "Catalan Manchester". Today many mills from that period can still be seen, with most of them having been refurbished as residential buildings or other services. Nowadays, Sabadell is basically a commercial and industrial city; there are no significant agricultural activities.

Sabadell is an important communications point. Two motorways run beside the city: the C-58 (from Barcelona to Manresa) and the AP-7 (from France and Girona to Tarragona, Valencia, and Andalusia), and some roads link Sabadell with nearby cities and towns: Barcelona, Terrassa, Cerdanyola del Vallès, Sant Quirze del Vallès, Barberà del Vallès, Sant Cugat del Vallès, Castellar del Vallès, Sant Llorenç Savall, Granollers, Rubí, Sentmenat, and Molins de Rei.

A railroad line crosses the city (the Rodalies Barcelona line from Barcelona to Lleida) and another one terminates in the city (the FGC line from Barcelona to Sabadell via Sant Cugat del Vallès).

== History ==
In Roman times, a little village called Arragone existed near where the church of La Salut now stands. This grew into the town called Arraona or Arrahona in the Middle Ages. Another little village was built just on the other side of the river. This second village, called Sabadell, located on a plain, began to grow and its population was about 600 people (152 houses) in 1378. Sabadell was enclosed by a wall, but due to population growth in the 16th century, some houses were built outside the wall. At that time the first textile industries appeared in the town, devoted especially to woolen clothing. The woolen industry grew over the next centuries, and in 1800 the town's population was about 2000 people.

The 19th century brought two important developments to the town: in 1856 the railway arrived, and in 1877 the town was dubbed a "city". In the 1897 census the population of the city was 23,064 people. The city had become the most important producer of woolen clothing in Spain, and these clothes achieved worldwide fame.

The modernisme movement (related to Art Nouveau) had an important influence in the architecture of the city in the early 20th century and distinctive buildings such as the modernista Hotel Suís (1902), Despatx Lluch (1908), and the Caixa d'Estalvis de Sabadell (1915), as well as the Torre de l'Aigua (1918) and the Mercat Central (1930), were built during the first half of the century.

In the early 20th century, Sabadell, with Terrassa, was the textile city par excellence, being the driving force of a territory poor in natural resources. The population was multiplied by eight, its industry boosted, particularly textiles and metals, and its economy was modernized in the service sector. Due to this industrial activity, Sabadell received massive waves of immigration in the 1950s, 1960s and early 1970s leading to uncontrolled urban expansion and the creation of some new neighborhoods such as Ca n'Oriac and Torre-Romeu.

Because both Terrassa and Sabadell wanted to be capitals of the Vallés Occidental, rivalry between them has lasted to contemporary times, birthing the popular sayings: "Sabadell mala pell" (Sabadell bad skin) and "Terrassa mala raça" (Terrassa bad race).

The growth of industry and population favored the emergence of an important workers' movement, and Catalanist, socialist and anarchist parties were very influential up until the upheavals of the Spanish Civil War (1936–39). The victory of the Fascist faction in the war was a step backwards for the city, but in the fifties industry recovered and grew once more. Industries needed workers, and many people came from Andalusia, Murcia, Extremadura, Castile and other parts of Spain to work in the textile and the metal industry. Again, a new workers' and Catalanist movement emerged, this time against Francisco Franco's regime and with the support of the Roman Catholic Church.

Sabadell was the host of some sessions of the Assemblea de Catalunya, a multi-party organization that brought together communists, socialists, Catalan nationalists, Catholics and others against the Franco regime. The 1973 oil crisis and Franco's death in 1975 meant an important change in Spain and, of course, in Sabadell. The economic crisis compelled the city to diversify its economic activities. New commercial and leisure areas (the Eix Macià) appeared next to the traditional industries, leading to important economic development for the city. An ETA car bombing in 1990 killed six police officers.

== Geography ==
Sabadell is located in the middle of the comarca named Vallès Occidental, approximately 20 km (12 mi) from Barcelona. It borders (clockwise, starting from the north) with Castellar del Vallès, Sentmenat, Polinyà, Santa Perpètua de Mogoda, Barberà del Vallès, Badia del Vallès, Cerdanyola del Vallès, Sant Quirze del Vallès, and Terrassa.

The city covers an area of 37.79 km^{2} (14.59 sq mi) and its population density is 5,337.57/km^{2} (13,824.2/sq mi) as of 2007. The altitude is 200 metres (660 ft).

=== Climate ===
Climate data for Sabadell (data from 1938–1969)
Month	Jan	Feb	Mar	Apr	May	Jun	Jul	Aug	Sep	Oct	Nov	Dec	Year
Mean daily maximum °C (°F)	11.2 (52.2)	12.2 (54.0)	14.4 (57.9)	17.6 (63.7)	20.8 (69.4)	24.3 (75.7)	27.6 (81.7)	27.1 (80.8)	24.0 (75.2)	19.3 (66.7)	14.7 (58.5)	11.9 (53.4)	18.8 (65.8)
Daily mean °C (°F)	8.0 (46.4)	8.9 (48.0)	10.9 (51.6)	12.9 (55.2)	16.3 (61.3)	20.2 (68.4)	23.0 (73.4)	23.1 (73.6)	20.4 (68.7)	15.9 (60.6)	11.6 (52.9)	8.6 (47.5)	15.0 (59.0)
Mean daily minimum °C (°F)	3.8 (38.8)	4.5 (40.1)	7.2 (45.0)	8.9 (48.0)	12.2 (54.0)	16.2 (61.2)	19.0 (66.2)	19.2 (66.6)	16.9 (62.4)	12.6 (54.7)	8.5 (47.3)	4.3 (39.7)	11.1 (52.0)
Source: Sistema de Clasificación Bioclimática Mundial

== Demographics ==
Historical population
Year	Pop.	±%
1842	2,000	—
1857	13,945	+597.2%
1877	18,247	+30.8%
1887	19,496	+6.8%
1900	23,375	+19.9%
1910	28,263	+20.9%
1920	37,074	+31.2%
1930	44,417	+19.8%
1940	48,403	+9.0%
1950	58,519	+20.9%
1960	105,339	+80.0%
1970	158,311	+50.3%
1981	186,123	+17.6%
1991	189,404	+1.8%
2001	183,788	−3.0%
2011	206,949	+12.6%
2021	216,759	+4.7%
Source: INE

As of 2025, the population is 224,589, of which 48.7% are males, and 51.3% are females. Minors make up 17.7% of the population, and seniors make up 19.4%.

=== Immigration ===
As of 2025, immigrants make up 20.9% of the population. The 5 largest foreign countries of birth are Morocco, Colombia, Ecuador, Bolivia, and Venezuela.

Foreign population by country of birth (2025)
Country	Population
Morocco	7,174
Colombia	4,057
Ecuador	3,373
Bolivia	3,268
Venezuela	3,097
Peru	2,385
Honduras	2,363
Argentina	1,776
Paraguay	1,601
Dominican Republic	1,527
Romania	1,364
Pakistan	1,298
China	1,256
Brazil	1,120
Cuba	802

== Sights ==
- Little church of Sant Nicolau (11th century) is a vestige of the town of Arraona
- Casa Duran is a traditional rural house (16th century) placed in the middle of the city
- Hotel Suís (Swiss Hotel, 1902)
- Caixa d'Estalvis (1915)
- Torre de l'Aigua (water tower, 1918)
- Mercat Central (Central Market, 1930)
- Tower of Feu (1879)

== Institutions ==
- Banco Sabadell, a major bank
- CE Sabadell FC, a football club

== Transport ==
Sabadell Airport, is located in the city centre but there no scheduled flights to and from airport. Air travel is currently served by Josep Tarradellas Barcelona–El Prat Airport which is located 38 km (24 mi) south west of Sababell.

== Sport ==
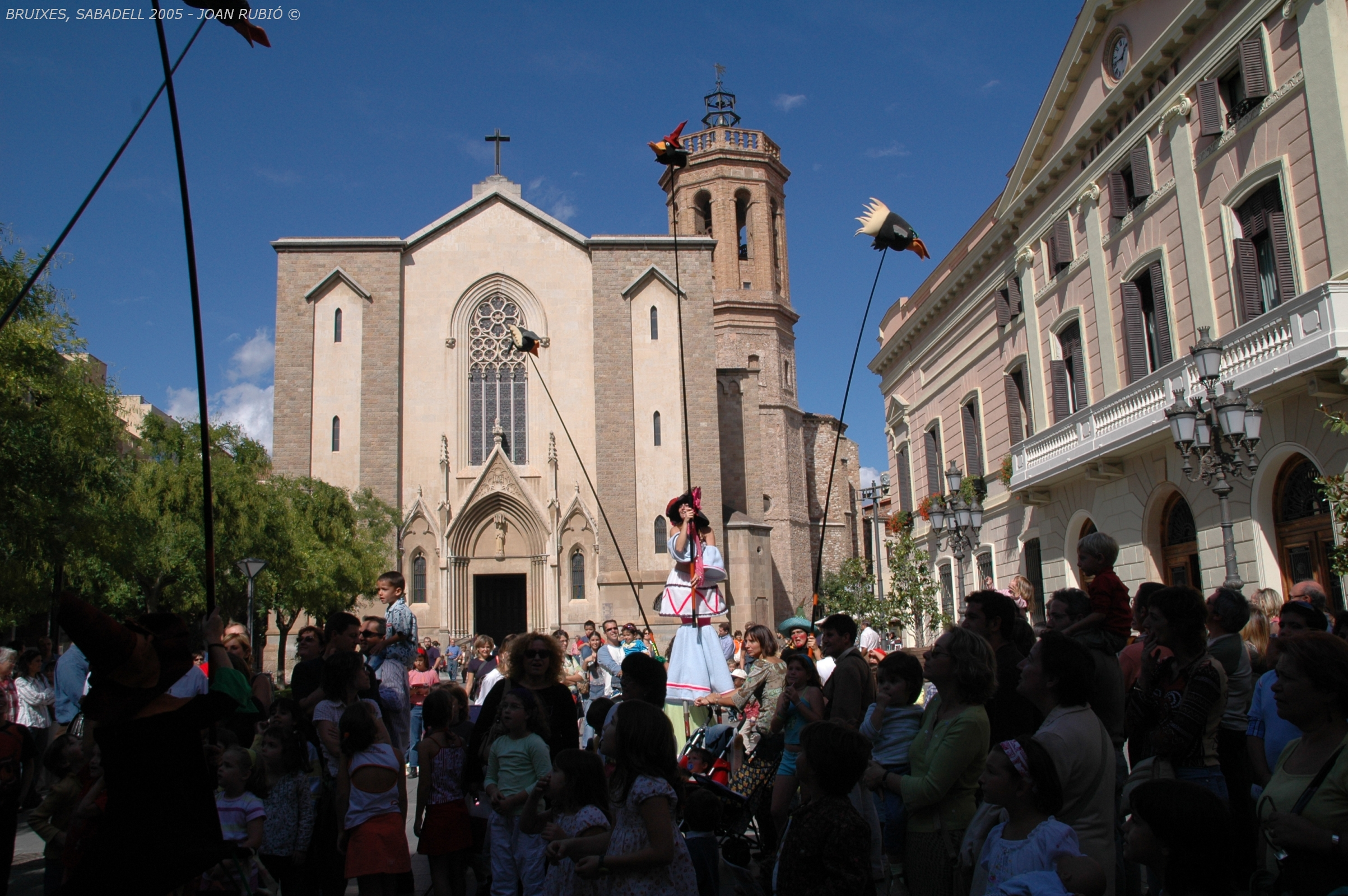
Plaça de Sant Roc in Sabadell

During the 1992 Barcelona Olympic Games, Sabadell was one of the cities where the football competition took place. The matches were played in the Nova Creu Alta stadium, which is also home to the main football club in town: Centre d'Esports Sabadell. This local team, currently in the Segunda División, has played 14 seasons in the Primera División (First Division), once in the UEFA Cup and has even reached the final of the Copa del Rey.

Other major sports clubs are Club Natació Sabadell (Waterpolo and Swimming Club), with more than 30,000 members, OAR Gràcia Sabadell (Handball), currently playing in the First National Division (Group C) of the Spanish Handball League, the Unió Excursionista de Sabadell - UES (Hikers Club), with almost 3,000 associates, two basketball teams, the Sabadell Bàsquet and Sant Nicolau, both of them currently playing at EBA League, the Fourth Division of the Spanish Basketball League, and two historical tennis clubs, Cercle Sabadellès 1856 and Club de Tennis Sabadell, with 4,000 and 3,500 associates respectively.

FC Barcelona player Sergio Busquets was born in Sabadell on 16 July 1988.

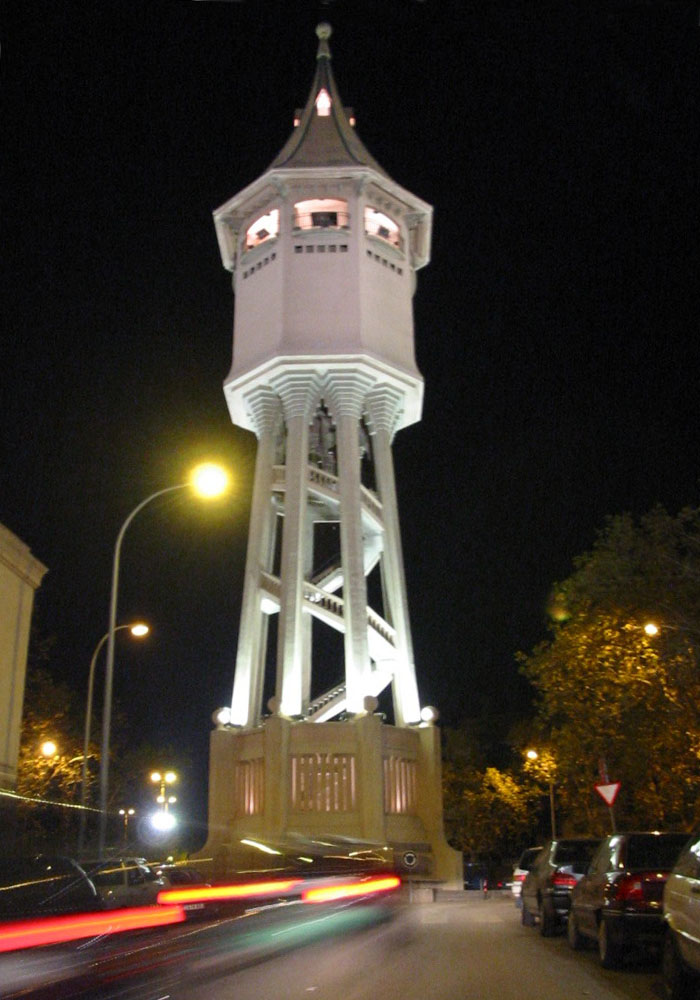
Torre de l'Aigua at night

== Notable people ==
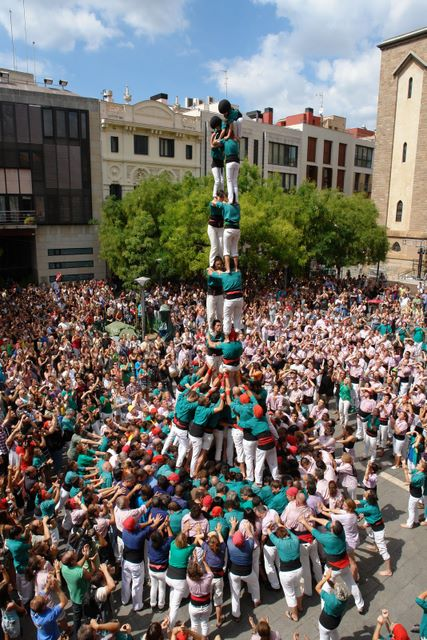
First 2 de 8 amb folre carregat by Castellers Sabadell in the Festa Major in 2011

- Agnès Armengol (1852–1934), writer, pianist, composer
- Ramon Barnils i Folguera (1940–2001), journalist and translator born in Sabadell
- Alfons Borrell i Palazón, painter
- Sergio Busquets (born 1988), footballer
- Aïcha Cámara (2006), footballer for Barcelona
- Benet Casablancas (1956–), composer and musicologist
- Sergio Dalma (1964–), pop singer
- Alberto Edjogo-Owono (born 1984), footballer (Equatorial Guinea international)
- Juvenal Edjogo Owono (born 1979), footballer (Equatorial Guinea international)
- Juan Fernández (1930–2020), racing driver
- Óscar García Junyent (born 1973), former footballer
- Roger García Junyent (born 1976), former footballer
- Jordi Gené (1970–), racing driver
- Marc Gené (1974–), racing driver and former F1 driver
- Aleix Gómez Abello (born 1997), handball player
- Moisés Hurtado (born 1981), footballer
- Kilian Jornet Burgada (born 1987), mountain runner
- Jimmy Jump, pitch invader
- Miguel Ángel Lozano (born 1978), footballer
- Jordi Masip (born 1989), footballer
- David Meca (1974–), professional swimmer
- Manel Navarro (born 1996), singer, entering Eurovision Song Contest 2017 with 'Do It for Your Lover'
- Eva Olid (born 1985), football manager
- Xavier Oriach (1927–), painter
- Dani Pedrosa (born 1985), Moto GP racer
- Oleguer Presas (born 1980), footballer
- Bernat Quintana, actor in El Cor de la Ciutat, Max
- Joan Oliver i Sallarès (1899–1986), Catalan-language poet and playwright, also known as Pere Quart
- Isaías Sánchez (born 1987), footballer
- Cristian Tello (born 1991), footballer
- Aschwin Wildeboer (1986–), swimmer
- Olaf Wildeboer (1983–), swimmer
- Ricard Zapata-Barrero (born 1965), scholar of migration studies

== International relations ==
- Sabadell is a member city of the Eurotowns network

== See also ==
- Transport in Sabadell
- Sabadell Metro
- Murder of Helena Jubany
