= Xavier Oriach =

French painter and engraver (1927–2024)

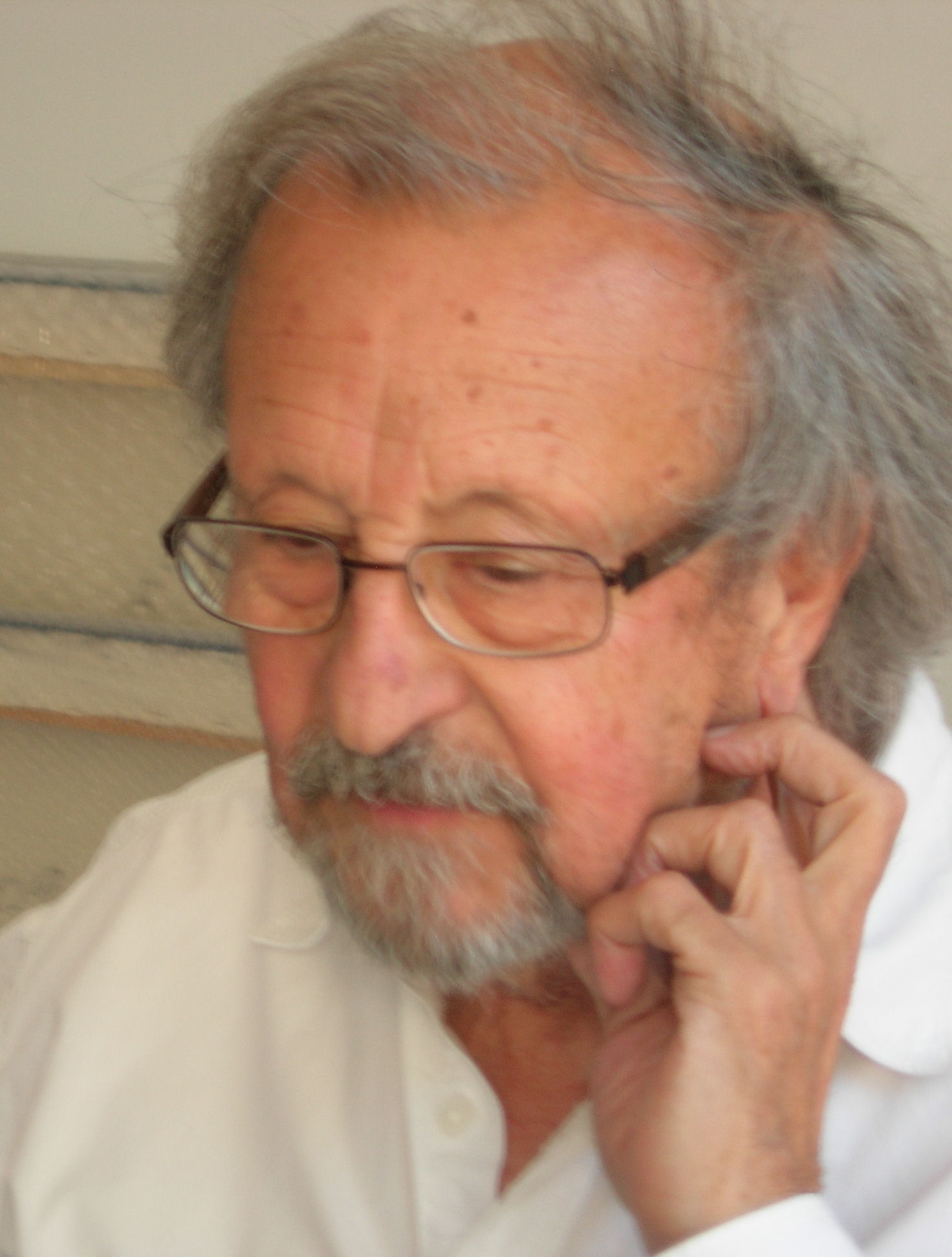
Xavier Oriach Portrait

Xavier Oriach (20 November 1927 – 9 September 2024) was a French painter and engraver from Catalonia. He is best known for his association with the School of Paris.

== Biography ==
Oriach was born in Sabadell in Catalonia; his family established itself there in the fifteenth century when his ancestors, the Oriacs of the Massif Central, settled in the area. His parents moved to Barcelona in 1930 to start a fashion house; they were accompanied there by Oriach's granduncle, the modernist photographer Albert Rifà. When his parents moved again, this time to Valencia, in 1934 to open a factory, Xavier returned with his great-uncle to Sabadell, spending much of the rest of his childhood in Rifà's studio. Encouraged by the succession of artists that frequented the atelier, Oriach began to draw and paint at the end of the 1930s.

In 1943 Oriach left his home village to rejoin his parents, working for a time in his father's business; it was his father that suggested he take drawing lessons. Consequently, in 1944 he entered the Fine Arts School of Valencia; it was there, in 1947, that he participated in the foundation of the avant-garde group Z. He began to incorporate elements of Fauvism into his work. The local French Institute accorded him a scholarship, which was enough to allow him, after a first exhibition of his work in Catalonia, to flee Francoist Spain.

In January 1951, Oriach settled in Paris, accompanied by his friend, guitarist Narciso Yepes. To continue painting he began experimenting with more diverse styles. He had, in his youth, met Antoni Clavé in Barcelona, and had known Manolo Gil in Valencia; in Paris he also came to know Antoni Tàpies, Eduardo Chillida, and Palazuelo. Some months after arriving he attracted the interest of Bernard Dorival, who invited him to the retrospective of Georges Braque then being organized at the Musée National d'Art Moderne. In 1953 Oriach was shown at the Galerie Breteau; not long afterwards he became involved in the New School of Paris, showing both at the Salon des Réalités Nouvelles ainsi and the Salon de Mai.

During the 1950s the Francoist State attempted to entice various artists in exile to return to Spain; notwithstanding the fact that most of the artists in question were ideologically opposed to the state it was hoped that such liberalization would help soften the government's image abroad. Nevertheless, Oriach refused to return; when he did leave Paris in 1979 it was only to establish himself at Jouy-sur-Eure (Normandy), where he had gone regularly since his arrival in France. There he turned his studio into a place for meetings and debates, creating a center for contemporary art where he showed the work of friends such as Pierre Tal Coat, Raoul Ubac, and Tàpies; he also founded a biennial for sculpture.

In 1991 Oriach moved again, this time to Normandy, where several retrospectives of his work have been organized; he also showed regularly in his native Catalonia.

Oriach died on 9 September 2024, at the age of 96.

== Work ==
Arriving in Paris as realism was losing favor, Oriach soon threw himself into the study of abstraction. Leaving aside the naturalism of his early style, he chose instead to focus on more nebulous, less concrete subjects. His work gradually grew larger, but has remained precise, combining elements of Catalan, French, and Spanish culture.
