= Javier Barraycoa =

Spanish writer and philosopher (born 1963)

Javier Barraycoa (born in Barcelona, 17 October 1963) is a philosopher and Spanish writer, associate professor of sociology at Abat Oliva CEU University in Barcelona. He has been secretary of the political party Comunión Tradicionalista Carlista in Catalonia and collaborates with La Gaceta. He is the current president and also founder of Somatemps. He states that is also a founder of Catalan Civil Society (Societat Civil Catalana, SCC) but the organisation negates it. However, Somatemps published in their blog a photograph of him being in a SCC meeting planning their political agenda while stating they gave the initial support to the entity.

He has published books delegitimizing Catalan nationalism by portraying it as racial nationalism, emphasizing the racism of some Catalan nationalists of the 19th century.

He denies that sardanas are Catalan, stating they were reinvented by andalusian-born Pep Ventura and that Catalan nationalism has hidden that fact.
