= Miriam Tey =

Spanish editor, writer and political activist

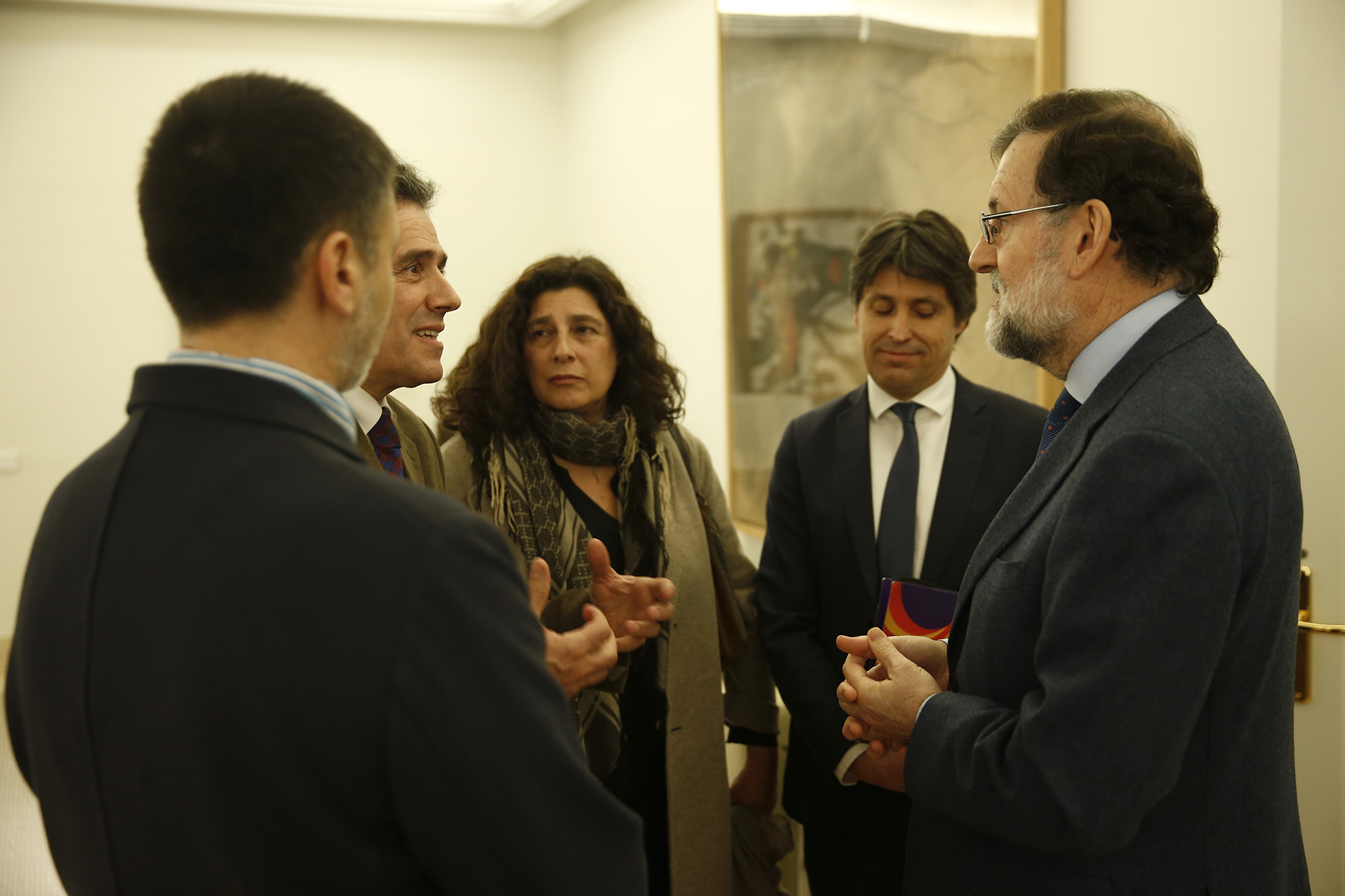
- Former President of Spain, Mariano Rajoy, receiving managers of Societat Civil Catalana. Tey pictured in center.
- Born: December 16, 1960 (age 64)
- Occupation(s): Editor, activist
- Organization: Societat Civil Catalana (SCC)
- Children: 1

Miriam Tey (born 16 December 1960) is a Spanish editor, writer and political activist. She served as vice-president of the Societat Civil Catalana until replaced by Álex Ramos year 2019 and is an outspoken opponent of Catalan nationalism and the separatist movement.

== Personal life ==
Miriam Tey was born in Barcelona, Spain on December 16, 1960. She has one adult son. Tey is the sister-in-law of diplomat, Jorge Moragas.

== Career ==
Tey began working at the publishing house, Tusquets Editores, when she was 19 years old. After working at Tusquets Editores, she worked as the literary director at the publishing house, Columna Edicions. While working at Columna Edicions, Tey founded Ediciones del Bronce, a publisher of foreign books translated into Spanish. After leaving Columna Edicions, Tey founded El Cobre Ediciones.

From 2003 to 2004, Tey served as director of Spain's Instituto de la Mujer, a public institute to further equality and women's rights. In 2003, El Cobre Ediciones published a novel by Hernan Migoya called Todas Putas (All Whores). The book caused a public backlash, and Tey received significant criticism regarding her perceived conflict as the publisher of the book and director of Instituto de la Mujer. Tey defended Todas Putas as a work of fiction, but ultimately withdrew the book.

== Activism ==
In 2015, she was a founding member of Centro Libre. Arte y Cultura (CLAC), a cultural and educational center founded to promote Catalan culture, art, and freedom of expression in Spain.

Miriam Tey has served as vice-president of Societat Civil Catalana since 2017. With Societat Civil Catalana and Josep Ramon Bosch, Tey worked to convince Manuel Valls to campaign in Spain's 2019 local elections as a Citizens candidate. Tey is an outspoken opponent of Catalan separatism, arguing that those in favor of separatism don't accurately reflect the wishes of the majority.
