= Central Market, Sabadell =

Coordinates: 41°32′50″N 2°06′18″E

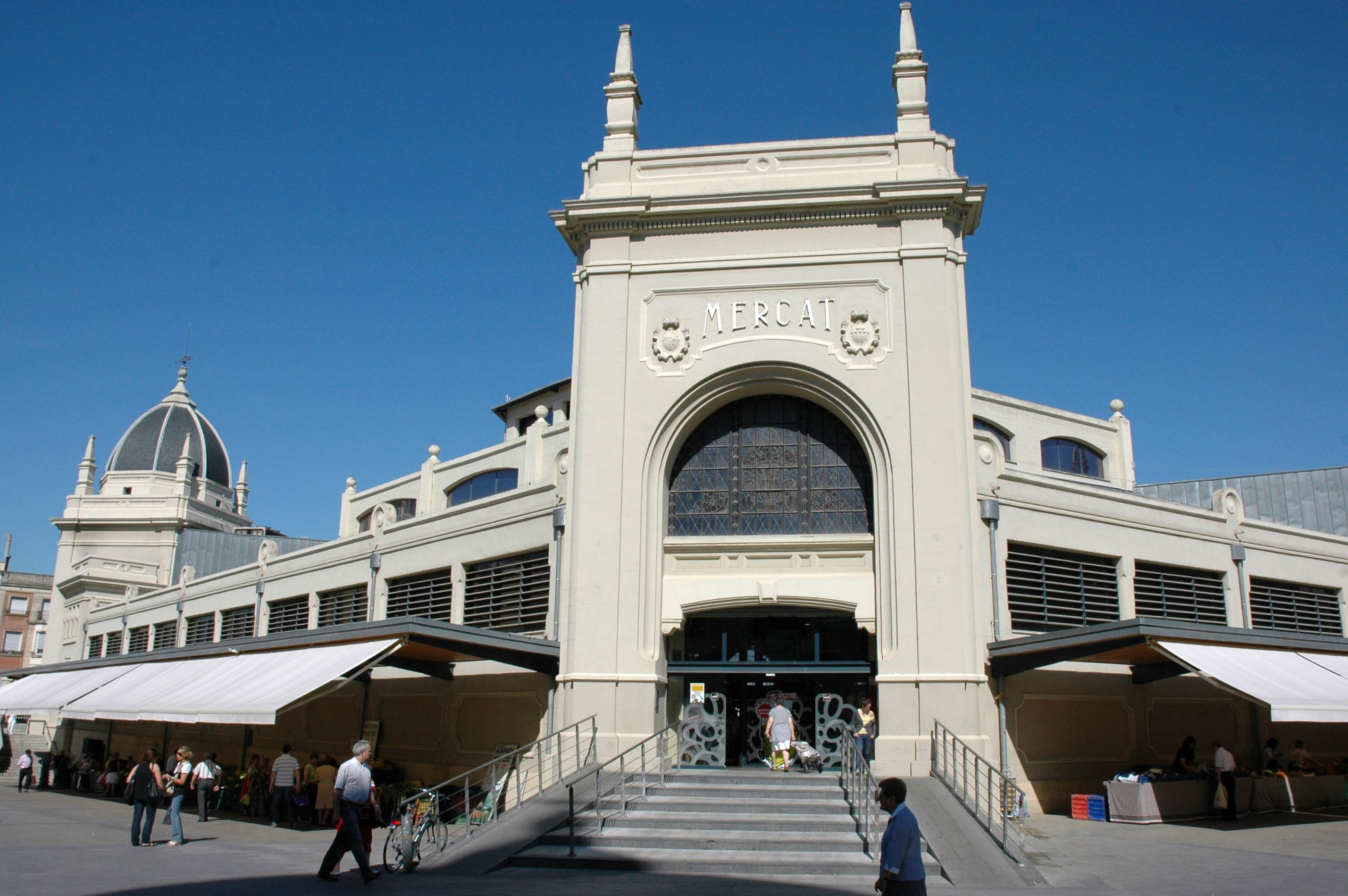
One of the entrances.

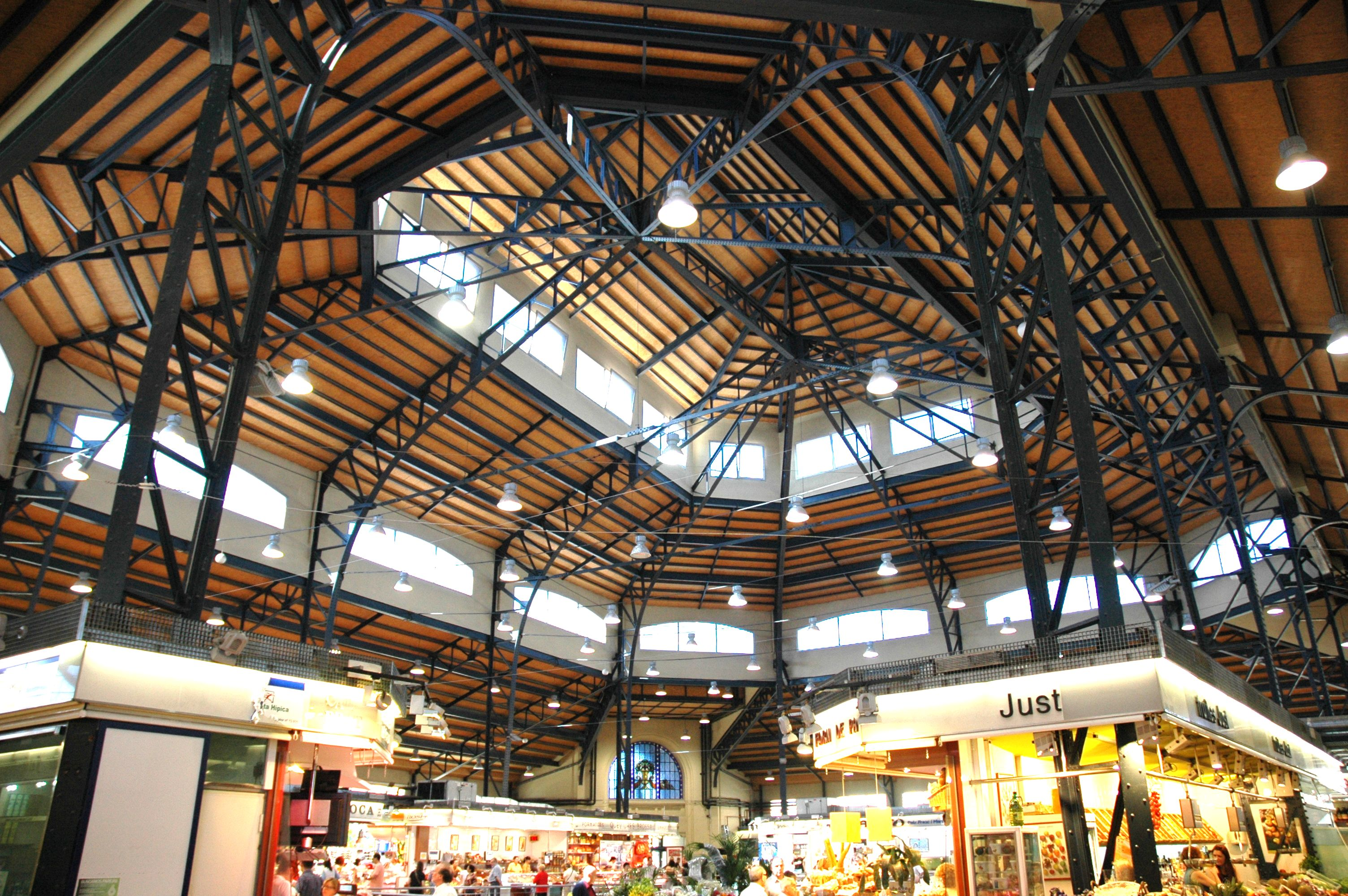
Interior.

The Central Market of Sabadell (Catalonia, Spain) is a large building designed between 1927 and 1930 by local architect Josep Renom i Costa, spanning both the "monumentalism" typical of the construction craze at the end of Miguel Primo de Rivera's dictatorship and the beginning of the Second Spanish Republic. In 2004 it underwent renovation work. It was devised at the time as a specially fine model for municipal structures of this sort. On the sides is inscribed the Catalan word for "market", mercat. Its floor is an irregular quadrilateral, and its basement included originally an ice factory which, however, was closed at the onset of the Republic because the former government didn't pay for its costs.

== Background ==
Prior to the construction of the current structure the area had been used as the city's market grounds for centuries. Researcher Joan Alsina located an early reference to a medieval market in a Latin volume called Liber Feudorum Maior calling it mercato de Sancto Salvatore, as early as February 12, 1064. Being used as an important public space and Sabadell already important in the Catalan region of Vallès, it attracted a good deal of tradesmen and farmers from other towns. The need to build a permanent market arose in the late 19th century, after a market in the same location had to be replaced due to its faulty construction, but a permanent solution wouldn't be found until the 1910s, along with further urbanisation of the city area, mostly under its architect Josep Renom i Costa.
