= Murder of Helena Jubany =

2001 murder in Catalonia, Spain

- Date: 2 December 2001
- Location: Sabadell (Catalonia)
- Type: Murder
- Cause: Murder
- Target: Helena Jubany i Lorente
- Deaths: 1
- Website: http://helena.jubany.cat/crim/

Helena Jubany Lorente (Mataró, 27 February 1974 – Sabadell, 2 December 2001) was a 27-year-old librarian found dead in Sabadell, Catalonia, after being thrown from a terrace into an inner courtyard. She was discovered stripped naked, with several burns on her body.

The case was dismissed, and a trial never took place. The circumstances, motive, and material perpetrators of the murder were never fully clarified. The proceedings were marred by irregularities, and the only person charged with the crime never admitted responsibility and committed suicide while in prison. On 23 March 2020, TV3’s program CRIMS aired a two-part feature on this case.

== Context ==
Helena Jubany was a journalist, librarian, and writer from Mataró who was actively involved in the cultural and social life of the region. She began her career as an intern at El Punt in Maresme, for the local TV station, and at the Robafaves local bookstore. In 2000, she worked as a librarian in Sentmenat, where she managed the children's section. Due to this new job, she moved to an apartment and lived alone in Sabadell. From that point on, she began collaborating with the Nature Section of Unió Excursionista de Sabadell, a local hiking association.

On 17 September 2001, Helena found a bottle of horchata and some small cakes on her doorstep, accompanied by a handwritten note. The note read:

Helena! Surprise!
We were near here and we thought:
Let's see what Helena can tell us.
we are ???? (We’ll give you a call!)
Let's have some fun!"

Horchata was her favorite drink, so the author of the note must have known this.

On 9 October, she found another gift on her doorstep, this time a bottle of Granini peach juice, accompanied by a second note. The note suggested she should accept the gift with good humor and that the mystery would soon be revealed. It read:

Helena, first of all we expect you to take this with the same sense of humor as we do.
In the third, you will discover the mystery. For sure you should see this as a laugh.
We would very much like to meet you again on a trip with the UES.
We’ll talk later!
Now let’s see if we find a good, nice and cheap place in Sabadell to perfect our English.
Ah! Enjoy the gift! Don’t be a spoilsport, ok?
Next time the drinks are on you! We are sure! Kisses!!

This time, Jubany tasted the juice but found it strange and didn’t finish it. Intrigued, she had it analyzed at a laboratory in Sabadell, where it was found to contain benzodiazepine, a sedative and anxiolytic drug.

== Murder ==
Helena Jubany left home at noon on Friday, 30 November, but never arrived at the Sentmenat Library where she worked. According to the investigation, she received a phone call that morning, and at noon, she reportedly left her house and drove to 48 Calvet d’Estrella Street in Sabadell. There, in the apartment of two acquaintances—Montse Careta, a teacher, and Santi Laiglesia, a criminal lawyer—she was allegedly drugged, left unconscious, and restrained. According to investigators and two forensic scientists, she remained in that state until Saturday. They explained that it takes many hours for benzodiazepine to be eliminated from the body through urine.

Later, while still alive, she was taken to the roof of the same building and thrown off between three and five o'clock in the morning on 2 December. She had a sedative dose 35 times higher than normal, though not enough to cause death. She died at the age of 27 from the impact after being thrown from the terrace. The autopsy confirmed that she was in a semi-coma when she was thrown.

The body fell through the clotheslines into the backyard of an adjacent building at 91-97 Guell i Ferrer Street. A neighbor discovered the body at 9 o'clock on the morning of 2 December, stripped naked and with burns on several parts. Her head was disfigured from the impact, making immediate identification impossible.

On Saturday, 1 December, Helena had arranged to have lunch with her father, Joan Jubany (born in Mataró, 1945). When she did not show up, he called her, but there was no answer. On Sunday, she had plans to meet a friend, but she did not appear. On Monday, her father contacted her workplace, where he was informed that she had not been to work the previous Friday. Her father then reported her missing.

== Investigation ==
The case was handled by Judge Manuel Horacio García of the Tribunal de Instrucción No. 3 in Sabadell. The initial police investigations suggested that the victim "fell" from the communal terrace of the property at 48 Calvet de Estrella Street, where Jubany's hair and clothes were found. The burns on her body were presumed to have occurred before she fell into the yard located at the confluence of Calvet de Estrella and Guell i Ferrer. A whitish substance was also found in her vagina, but the investigation did not clarify what it was.

Jubany's death had a profound impact in Mataró, where she was well known in cultural circles. The first interrogations of family members, coworkers, neighbors, and friends allowed the police to determine that Montserrat Careta i Herrera was the one person linked to the location where the body was found. Careta, who lived on Calvet de Estrella Street in the building with the terrace from which the victim was allegedly thrown, was identified as a key figure. Investigations later revealed a connection between Montserrat Careta, Santi Laiglesia, a criminal lawyer and Careta's partner, and Ana Echaguivel Rad. All three were associated with the hiking group Unió Excursionista de Sabadell.

It was also suggested that the handwritten notes may have been written by Montserrat Careta, with part of the second note possibly written by the other defendant, Ana Echaguivel. None of the defendants could verify their whereabouts on the night of the events or explain why they had not gone to work on the morning of 3 December. Both Careta and Laiglesia participated in a trip with the Sabadell Hiking Group on 2 December, although they had not been previously registered.

=== Arrest and suicide ===
On 12 February 2002, Montserrat Careta was arrested as the alleged perpetrator of the crime. She was detained at Wad-Ras prison in Barcelona. In her apartment, two pots of Noctamid, a psychopharmacological drug with hypnotic effects containing benzodiazepine—the same substance found in the victim's body—were discovered. The national police also found a box of matches similar to those located on the roof, which were allegedly used to burn Helena. During her time in prison, Careta consistently protested her innocence through letters she sent to family and friends.

While Careta was in jail, the judge indicted Santiago Laiglesia and Ana Echaguivel. On 23 March, he arrested Echaguivel, then 32 years old and a resident of Sabadell, after a calligraphy test determined that she had authored the first half of the second anonymous letter that Jubany had received in the weeks before her death.

On 7 May 2002, Montserrat Careta was found dead, hanging in the bathroom of her cell at Barcelona's Wad-Ras prison, according to her lawyer, Joaquim Escudé. She left a note in which she claimed innocence regarding the murder attributed to her. Ana Echaguivel, also in pre-trial detention, was released on bail a few days later, in June 2002.

The secrecy of the summary proceedings was lifted in the autumn of 2002, and Helena Jubany's relatives held a press conference on 3 October. During the conference, family lawyer Pep Manté presented a possible hypothesis for the murder, attributing it to a "role playing game." The family’s legal representative argued that under no circumstances did the young woman suspect she was part of a macabre game that would lead to her death. He claimed that Jubany had mentioned receiving anonymous notes, but she was not afraid—only intrigued and curious.

The investigation remained open to determine the events that occurred between noon on 30 November and 9 a.m. on 2 December, when the body was found. Santi Laiglesia, who was considered a co-author of the murder, did not appear in any of the nearly 1,000 pages of the investigation. Laiglesia's lawyer, Joaquim Escudé, declared, "See? We will never really know what happened."

=== Closing the case ===
The case was finally closed in October 2005, when the judge determined that the "solidity of the evidence" was not "sufficient" to sustain the accusation against Careta's partner, Santiago Laiglesia Pla, or Ana Echaguivel, both members of the UES.

In 2017, two journalism students, Anna Prats and Iago García, attempted to gather all the information in order to clarify the facts. Both the victim's family and Montserrat Careta's family believe that the perpetrator or perpetrators of the murder "remain free." Careta's relatives point out that Laiglesia, a lawyer and criminologist, almost always slept in the same building where the events occurred and, according to the Careta family, had the keys to the flat. Additionally, the family claims that the box of matches and Noctamid were positioned in such a way that quick and easy conclusions could have been drawn just two months after the event. Furthermore, the results of the first calligraphy test were discarded after later studies.

=== Request for reopening the case ===
The relatives of Jubany and Careta demanded the reopening of the case, citing irregularities in the investigation. They questioned why investigators didn't take fingerprints from Helena's car, the flat, or the terrace, and why the police waited for hours before searching Montserrat Careta's flat after her arrest. They also argued that the evidence appeared to be "prepared," suggesting that if Montserrat Careta had actually administered the drugs to Jubany and burned her, she would not have left the incriminating evidence at home for more than two months.

Another argument they put forward is that even if Careta were guilty, her small stature would not have allowed her to commit the crime alone. As detailed in the investigation, she would not have had the strength to carry Helena Jubany's unconscious body up the stairs. Careta lived on the third floor and would have had to carry the body to the roof, which was located on the fourth floor of a building without an elevator. Nor would she have had the strength to lift Jubany and throw her off the terrace. A language study published in December 2018 ruled out the theory that the anonymous letters had been written by Montserrat Careta. In fact, a national police officer strongly believes that the killer is Santiago Laiglesia.

The perpetrator and motive of the crime have yet to be determined, and in 2025, the crime will become unprosecutable in accordance with the law.

== Legacy ==
In 2007, the Helena Jubany Cultural Association was established to preserve her memory. An annual literary prize for short narratives or collections of stories is awarded each year in the capital of Maresme.
