= Reactions to the 2017 Catalan independence referendum =

As a result of the advisory 2017 Catalan independence referendum, reactions came from a multitude of avenues, including the domestic central state and other official bodies, as well as international commentary. Whilst the government and non-government community in Catalonia defended the vote, most of the international community either defended Spain's "territorial integrity" or simply criticised the central police's overhanded response. Other sub-national entities also supported Catalonia.

== Domestic ==
=== Catalonia ===
Catalonian President Carles Puigdemont said he will keep his pledge to declare independence unilaterally. He added that Catalonia "has won the right to become an independent state." He further blamed the situation in Catalonia on the "intransigence, the repression, the complete denial of reality, the hostility seen during the democratic demands made by our country" and that "on this day of hope and suffering, Catalonia's citizens have earned the right to have an independent state in the form of a republic ... We have earned the right to be listened to, respected and recognised."

Barcelona Mayor Ada Colau called on Spanish Prime Minister Mariano Rajoy to resign, She told TV3 that "Rajoy has been a coward, hiding behind the prosecutors and courts. Today he crossed all the red lines with the police actions against normal people, old people, families who were defending their fundamental rights. It seems obvious to me that Mariano Rajoy should resign." She added that Catalonia has "earned the right to demand" a proper vote on independence from Spain: "the European Union must take a stand on what has happened in Catalonia".

Jordi Sanchez, leader of the ANC, spoke in Barcelona's main square saying he hopes that "very soon we will see the birth of a new Catalan state." He also warned local leaders: "Now, don't let us down ... The moment of truth has arrived." Government Spokesman Jordi Turull said that Spain is "the shame of Europe" for its crackdown. He added that "what the police are doing is simply savage, it's an international scandal". The CCOO union called for a general strike on 3 October "to condemn the violence employed by security forces of the state to stop the referendum". It also called for protests on 2 October at 12:00 in front of town halls across Catalonia. Jordi Cuixart, the leader of Omnium, also urged a general strike in Catalonia on 3 October.

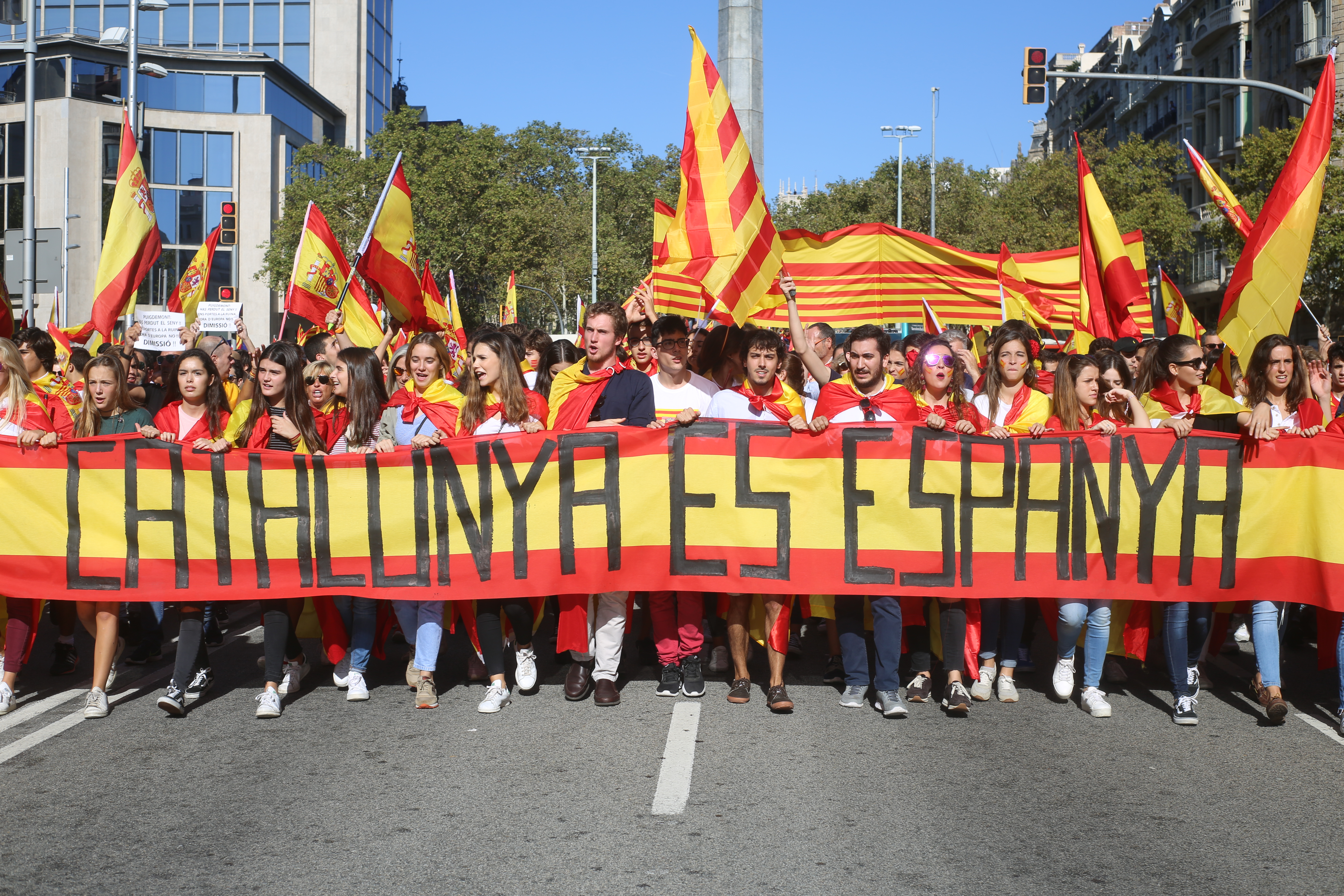
Demonstration on 8 October 2017

On 8 October 2017, Societat Civil Catalana gathered over a million people according to the organizers and the Spanish government and 350,000 people according to Barcelona police, in a rally against Catalan independence. To date this event was the largest pro-Constitution and anti-independence demonstration in the history of Catalonia.

On 12 October 2017, 65,000 people, according to the Barcelona local police, marched against independence in a smaller demonstration marking the Spanish national day. The turnout was thirteen times more than the prior year and the highest on record in Barcelona's history for this event.

On 29 October 2017, hundreds of thousands of people demonstrated on the streets of Barcelona in favor of the unity of Spain and celebrating the Spanish government forcing new regional elections in December, in a demonstration called by Societat Civil Catalana. According to the Delegation of the Spanish government in Catalonia the turnout was of 1,000,000 people whereas according to the Barcelona police it was of 300,000 people. Societat Civil Catalana itself estimated the turnout at 1,000,000 people.

=== Central government ===
In a televised statement, King Felipe VI said the referendum's organisers had jeopardised national stability "with their decisions, they have systematically undermined the rules approved legally and legitimately, showing an unacceptable disloyalty towards the powers of the state—a state that represents Catalan interests."

Prime Minister Mariano Rajoy claimed that no referendum had been held. He also praised the police for acting with "firmness and serenity." Foreign Minister Alfonso Dastis said the police actions were "unfortunate" and "unpleasant" but "proportionate." He told the Associated Press, that he blamed the violence exclusively on Puigdemont and his regional government: "if people insist in disregarding the law and doing something that has been consistently declared illegal and unconstitutional, law enforcement officers need to uphold the law." In regards to the constitution MP Rafael Hernando said: "The [Article] 155 needs wide-ranging backing because we don't know whether it will resolve problems, and if it's only backed by one party in congress then it will be difficult to obtain the backing of a majority of Catalans."

PSOE's General Secretary Pedro Sánchez said that the vote "has perverted the concept of democracy" and urged central government to begin negotiations with the regional Catalan leaders. He also blamed the "serious institutional crisis" on both the central government and the regional Catalan government. He further condemned Rajoy's cabinet for ordering the police charges against voters to halt the suspended referendum, but added that he would stand by Rajoy in order to support the stability of Spain in a moment of deep crisis. He then added that the vote "consecrates the Catalan government's flight forward, creating solely division and not providing any solution."

=== Economy ===
The following day the Madrid-based Ibex fell by over one percent, despite regional and global markets rising. The Euro also fell. On 4 October, after announcing its relocation to Madrid, Catalan enterprise Oryzon rose over a 20% in the Madrid Stock Exchange. One day later, Banco Sabadell agreed to move their headquarters to Alicante.

In successive days, La Caixa moved to Valencia and other enterprises left Catalonia, many of them helped by a decree of the Spanish government for easing the relocation of their registration. As of 10 October, 28 enterprises, including six of the seven Catalan enterprises that make up the index, left the region and six more companies reported it would do so if the independence of Catalonia is declared by a Unilateral declaration of independence.

As of 18 October, this number increased to 805, including companies like Codorníu Winery, established in 1551, which moved to La Rioja, or the airline Volotea, that relocated their headquarters in Asturias.

=== Sport ===
FC Barcelona played their weekend La Liga match against Las Palmas behind closed doors, partially due to safety purposes, as well as in protest. During Spain national football team's training session on 2 October 2017, Piqué was the target of insults by many Spanish fans, due to his comments after Barcelona's 3–0 win over Las Palmas. The session had to be ended after just 23 minutes due to this. Barcelona captain Andrés Iniesta urged dialogue to resolve the situation. He wrote on Facebook: "I have never before publicly commented on situations that are so complex and involve such diverse emotions, but this situation we are experiencing is exceptional, one thing I know for sure: before we do any more harm, those who are responsible for all this must hold dialogue. Do it for all of us. We deserve to live in peace".

== International ==
=== Supranational bodies ===
- Council of Europe - Vice-President Roger Gale of the Parliamentary Assembly declared said: "It is with deep regret that I have seen the incidents of violence that have occurred in Catalonia today. I call on all sides to exercise restraint and self-discipline and to work to restore calm and reestablish dialogue."
  - Venice Commission – The Commission said the vote "does not meet" the commission's standards for a fair referendum, as it is not recognised by the Spanish government or its constitution. Secretary General Thomas Markert did make the point of referencing the 2014 Scottish referendum, highlighting it as an example of a fair, legally-approved vote as it gained the support of the U.K. government.
- Organization for Security and Co-operation in Europe (OSCE) – The OSCE's Office for Democratic Institutions and Human Rights (ODIHR) told TASS on 2 October that it would not comment on the vote because it had no observers present. Earlier, the OSCE office's director called on Spanish authorities to "ensure that police use force only when necessary and in strict adherence to the principle of proportionality."
- United Nations - Secretary-General António Guterres "trusts that the democratic institutions of Spain will find a solution" to the crisis between Catalan separatists and the national government."
  - High Commissioner for Human Rights Prince Zeid Ra'ad al-Hussein voiced concern at the violence in saying police responses needed to be "at all times ...proportionate and necessary. I firmly believe that the current situation should be resolved through political dialogue, with full respect for democratic freedoms."
  - On 7 March 2018 the High Commissioner for Human Rights said "I was dismayed by the violence which broke out during October's referendum on independence in Catalonia. Given what appeared to be excessive use of force by police, the Government's characterization of police action on 1 October as "legal, legitimate and necessary" is questionable".

==== European Union ====
The European Commission suggested that the Catalan independence referendum was "not legal" under Spanish law. It described the vote as an "internal matter" and suggested it would not heed calls to intervene. A spokesperson Margaritis Schinas said: "This is an internal matter for Spain that has to be dealt with in line with the constitutional order of Spain." It issued a statement that read: "We call on all relevant players to now move very swiftly from confrontation to dialogue. Violence can never be an instrument in politics. We trust the leadership of Prime Minister Mariano Rajoy to manage this difficult process in full respect of the Spanish Constitution and of the fundamental rights of citizens enshrined therein. Beyond purely legal aspects, the Commission believes that these are times for unity and stability, not divisiveness and fragmentation."

President Donald Tusk later announced on Twitter that he had spoken with Rajoy and had called for a bid to find ways "to avoid further escalation and use of force." President of the European Parliament Antonio Tajani confirmed a debate. He wrote on Twitter: "I spoke to Mariano Rajoy. The European Parliament will debate on constitution, rule of law and fundamental rights in Spain in light of the events in Catalonia.".

The Vice President of the European Parliament, Ramón Luis Valcárcel, described the referendum as "a coup against Europe" in a statement that read: "Today we have witnessed a nationalistic propaganda act, undemocratic; a coup attempt against Spanish democracy, and so a coup against Europe. We are witnessing the first coup against democracy in the history of the European Union. A regional government is angling, in a unilateral, illegal and democratically deplorable manner, to secede from a member state. And [sic] in so doing, it is violating the fundamental rights of millions of citizens. Spain is an integral part of the EU, which respects and safeguards the national identities and constitutional structure of its member states. An attack on the constitution of one member state is therefore also an attack on the Union as a whole." The coup d'état claim was also shared by both Spanish MEP Carlos Iturgaiz and Ambassador to the UK Carlos Bastarreche.

European Commission First Vice President Frans Timmermans told the European Parliament: "It is a duty for any government to uphold the rule of law, and this sometimes requires the proportionate use of force. Respect for the rule of law is not optional; it's fundamental."

The Budget Commissioner Gunther Oettinger said "that the situation is very, very disturbing. A civil war is planned in the middle of Europe. One can only hope that a conversation will be made between Madrid and Barcelona soon." He added that the EU could only mediate talks "if asked."

===== MEPs =====
Spokesman for the European People's Party which is the largest group inside the European Parliament, said: "Someone needs to tell the Catalan people the truth. If you contest the law to abandon Spain you also need to know that you abandon the EU."

- The Leader of the Alliance of Liberals and Democrats for Europe group and Belgian MEP Guy Verhofstadt, who leads the EU-Brexit negotiations, called for de-escalation and a negotiated solution to the conflict. "In the European Union we try to find solutions through political dialogue and with respect for the constitutional order."
- The Chair of Europe of Freedom and Direct Democracy and British MEP Nigel Farage expressed his opinion in the European Parliament in saying: "Whether or not it was legal nationally for people in Catalonia to have a vote, surely people are allowed to express an opinion. We saw women being dragged out of polling stations by their hair, old ladies with gashes in their forehead. The most extraordinary display and what do we get from Mr. Juncker today? Not a dickie-bird. In fact previously we had that the rule of law must be maintained and I think it is quite extraordinary to realise that this union is prepared to turn a blind eye."
- German and Vice President of the Greens–European Free Alliance MEP Ska Keller said that "the Commission could act as an "honest broker" to promote compromise. "It is wrong if the Commission shies away and continues to turn a blind eye."
- Estonian MEP Urmas Paet issued a statement that read: "I would expect a clear stance from Estonia as the EU presidency concerning yesterday's police violence in Catalonia. In fact, I would have expected it yesterday already. Yet both the prime minister and the foreign minister remain silent. Why [is] the role of [the] EU presidency for Estonia if we are trying to avoid a stance on a matter so important? The position of [the] EU presidency entails responsibility in addition to honor."
- Czech MEP Pavel Svoboda said the actions of the Spanish government were deplorable and would only make more people embrace the separatist cause.
- Communist Party of Bohemia and Moravia and Crezh MEP Kateřina Konečná pointed out that the violence accompanying the referendum was likely to fuel opposition to the Spanish government and anger extremists, as well as normal citizens who may previously not have had a strong opinion on the matter, producing a strong backlash and the exact opposite of what the government intended. She said the Spanish government should look to the UK and the Scottish independence referendum for a lesson on how such things should best be handled.
- German MEP Manfred Weber said: "If Catalonia leaves Spain that also means 'leaving the European Union.'"
- Philippe Lamberts, a Belgian MEP who co-leads the Greens group in the European Parliament, warns that events in Catalonia "threaten the spirit of European integration, even more than Brexit."

=== Countries ===
- Australia - Prime Minister Malcolm Turnbull referred to the referendum as "unauthorised" during a press conference with Foreign Affairs Minister Julie Bishop.
- Azerbaijan - The Spokesperson of the Foreign Ministry Hikmat Hajiyev said: "The Republic of Azerbaijan respects the territorial integrity and sovereignty of the Kingdom of Spain within its internationally recognised borders. We are looking forward to settlement of existing situation by peaceful means on the basis of the Constitution and laws of Spain."
- Belgium – Prime Minister Charles Michel condemned the unfolding violence and called for political dialogue between the two sides. He also wrote: "Violence can never be the answer!"
- Botswana – In a statement via Facebook, the Government of Botswana condemned and regretted "the illegal signing of a unilateral declaration of independence" of Catalonia.
- Canada – Prime Minister Justin Trudeau expressed support for "One united Spain", adding that "We understand there are significant internal discussions that they are going through right now and we simply call for those discussions to be done according to the rule of law, according to the Spanish constitution, according to the principles of international law. But mostly that those conversations and discussions happen in a peaceful, non-violent way."
  - (Quebec) Québec – Premier Philippe Couillard wrote on Twitter: "Québec condemns all forms of violence. The answer: dialogue between [both] sides." Parti Québécois leader Jean-François Lisée wrote on Twitter: "I salute the Catalan people who are standing in front of the unworthy and disgraceful violence of the Spanish state" and that this was "[a] dark day for Europe and democracy. All leaders must denounce Spain." Montréal Mayor Denis Coderre affirmed his solidarity with his Barcelona counterpart, Ada Colau, by writing on Twitter: "We must condemn all violence and protect democracy." Opposition party Coalition Avenir Québec stated in a press release that it "deplores the use of force and repression by the Spanish state;" it further reaffirmed Catalonia's "right of self[-]determination."
  - On 4 October, the National Assembly of Quebec unanimously adopted a resolution deploring "the authoritarian attitude of the Spanish government which led to acts of violence" during the referendum as well as "the number of people injured." The resolution further called on Catalonia and Spain to begin a "political and democratic dialogue to peacefully and consensually resolve their differences [...] with international mediation if both parties consent to it." The vote was 113-0. Though the resolution was initially proposed by the sovereigntist opposition Parti Québécois, the Liberal government, which opposes Quebec independence, agreed to support it after the motion was amended so that the call for international mediation was conditioned on both parties accepting it.
- Croatia - Prime Minister Andrej Plenković also condemned violence and stressed that Croatia considers this referendum an internal issue of Spain. In an official statement, the Ministry of Foreign and European Affairs called for calming down the situation after the referendum and expressed concern over the violence. He also called on the Spanish and Catalan government's to launch a dialogue on finding a peaceful solution to the problem.
- Cyprus - The Foreign Ministry issued a statement that read Spain's national sovereignty and territorial integrity need to be respected, arguing that the referendum was carried out "in violation" of the Spanish constitution. "Spain's unity must be upheld as well as its constitutional order...dialogue and restraint are only the way forward."
- Czech Republic: Deputy Prime Minister for Science, Research and Innovation Pavel Bělobradek said that political issues should not be resolved by force. Defence Minister Martin Stropnický said that while he was against Catalonia breaking away from Spain, he considered the use of force against civilians a big mistake; he asked "is this really Europe 2017?", while the Foreign Ministry commented on "improper force" being used and noted the "high number of people injured."
- Denmark - Foreign Minister Anders Samuelsen said: "I am not in a situation where I must condemn what is happening. I will express my concern, as I should do. I do not like to see images like this in Europe. I think that everyone must by now have learned that dialogue is the way forward. [This is] entirely an internal Spanish matter."
- France - President Emmanuel Macron's office issued a statement afterward in support of Spain's "constitutional unity."
- Germany - Interim Foreign Minister Sigmar Gabriel released a statement, echoing the EU's calls for dialogue, that read: "the images that reached us yesterday from Spain show how important it is to interrupt the spiral of escalation."
  - Green party co-leader Cem Özdemir, condemned the force used in writing: "Whether or not the referendum was legitimate, the violence by police against voters was disproportionate and harmful to such an important dialogue."
- Greece: President Prokopis Pavlopoulos said, during a visit to Belgrade, speaking of the need to "defend the unity and cohesion of the European Union."
- Holy See - Pope Francis said, in a speech to university students during a visit to Bologna, "don't be afraid of unity! May special interests and nationalism not render the courageous dreams of the founders of the European Union in vain." He also recalled that the European Union was borne out of the ashes of war to guarantee peace.
- Hungary - Prime Minister Viktor Orbán said: "The Catal[oni]an referendum is a Spanish internal issue and accordingly Hungary is not commenting on the subject."
- Indonesia - Minister of Foreign Affairs Retno Marsudi said: "Indonesia does not recognize the unilateral statement of Catalonian independence. Catalonia is an integral part of Spain."
- (Republic of Ireland) Ireland - Taoiseach Leo Varadkar said Ireland respects the courts and constitution of Spain, but criticised the violence. He further added Spain is a "friend and ally" of Ireland and that he was "distressed" by the scenes of violence.
  - Leader of Sinn Féin TD Gerry Adams welcomed the result of the referendum and said the voice of the Catalan people "must be respected by the Spanish government and the international community."
- Israel - During a press conference, Prime Minister Benjamin Netanyahu's spokesman David Keyes directed inquiries on Catalonia to the Foreign Ministry where its spokesman Emmanuel Nahshon said: "We see it as an internal Spanish matter."
- Italy
  - Sardinia: After the actions of the Spanish government against the referendum, the region of Sardinia expressed its support and solidarity to the Catalan community by means of unanimous resolution of the regional council, and offered to the government of Catalonia to print ballots for the referendum and to guard them, rejecting the negative attitude of the Spanish government towards political dialogue. On 25 October, the Sardinian council issued a new resolution condemning the use of violence adopted by the Civil Guard and expressing the wish that Catalans may pursue a pacific path towards the right to choose any political option, including self-determination. On 31 October over 100 Sardinian mayors and administrators issued a statement symbolically recognizing Catalonia's independence.
  - Veneto – Stefano Valdegamberi said his region would support Catalonia during its fight against Madrid's attempts to stop the region from becoming independent. Speaking to RT UK, he said: "The Veneto region and the Veneto people are very close to the Catalan people. We want to recognise that the will of Catalans is the most important thing for the international community. Spain recognises other countries like Montenegro but they don't accept something similar for themselves. They demonstrated they are not a democratic government."
- Japan - The Foreign Ministry issued a statement that read they are not taking any sides in the referendum as is an internal issue. No significant effects to tourism between the Catalonia region and Japan was reported.
- Lithuania - The Foreign Ministry issued a statement that read: "The Catalan referendum of 1 October 2017 failed to comply with the Spanish Constitution. Lithuania fully supports the territorial integrity and sovereignty of the Kingdom of Spain. The rule of law has to be upheld. We call upon parties to engage in a constructive dialogue and calm tensions."
- Malta - Foreign Minister Carmelo Abela condemned the violence in Catalonia. In a statement, the Foreign Ministry suggested: "The Ministry for Foreign Affairs & Trade Promotion are closely following the events in Catalonia. We respect the Spanish Constitutional Court's decision that Sunday's vote was not legal, and this is an internal matter for Spain. We condemn violence of any kind, and believe dialogue is always the way forward."
- Mexico - Secretary of Foreign Affairs Luis Videgaray said that "if Catalonia goes for becoming independent from Spain, the Government of Mexico will not recognise it as a sovereign state."
- New Zealand
  - A joke account of Prime Minister Jacinda Ardern's cat, Paddles, tweeted "I think they need more cats and the cats they do have need more pats. That would solve a lot." after being asked "What are your thoughts on the current situation in #CATalonia? [sic]".
- Poland - The Ministry of Foreign Affairs published a statement fully respecting "the principles of sovereignty, territorial integrity, and unity of the Kingdom of Spain."
  - Silesia - The Movement for the Autonomy of Slask (RAS) said that the events in Catalonia were proof of the temptation to use repression to control political dissent. "The European community should work out rules and procedures for solving similar conflicts. It's indifference with respect to the forceful repression of aspirations of Catalan people for self-rule will be interpreted as a sign of weakness and will deepen the confidence crisis that many Europeans feel towards EU institutions."
- Portugal - Foreign Minister Augusto Santos Silva declined to comment on the referendum, but he believes the Spanish government will be able to resolve the issue in agreement with the Spanish constitution and law. Silva added that this is an internal affair of Spain.
  - In a manifesto signed by almost a hundred people, academics, deputies, journalists, doctors, journalists and notably by the former Socialist presidential candidate Manuel Alegre and the former leader of the Left Bloc Francisco Louçã appealed to a "negotiated political solution" to the political situation in Catalonia, considering themselves "outraged" by the civil rights abuses committed by the Spanish government.
- Russia - President Vladimir Putin said that Russia regards the Catalonia conflict as a "domestic affair." He also hoped the country could overcome the crisis.
  - The Head of the International Affairs committee at Russia's upper house Konstantin Kosachev called on the Spain government to lead dialogue with Catalans. Otherwise, he argued, their contradictions would only deepen, which could end with the breakup of the state, as in Ukraine. This polling, like the earlier polling in Iraqi Kurdistan, "is another clear and evident clash of the basic principles the humanity follows: the territorial integrity and the right to self-determination. A state should be talking to its citizens, should reach accord. Like we are doing in Russia."
  - Chair of the Federation Council's Committee on Information Policy Aleksei Pushkov wrote on Twitter: "In Catalonia the police [have] started beating the peacefully protesting people who are not making provocations. PACE and the PA OSCE will definitely not notice this. Democracy!"
  - Writing on Facebook, former MP Sergei Markov wrote that Moscow was taking a "very cautious" approach. He also noted that interfering would be "counterproductive" and wanted to avoid allegations of interference, in part hoping such behavior would be noted by the European Union. He added: "The allegations in the U.S. are more than enough. Russia is literally being hounded." Russia wants to "underline that the European Union has no moral right to lecture Russia." He added that Russia also had no particular "compassion" for Madrid, which it sees as part of the "front of Western powers pressuring Russia with sanctions. So Russia for the moment is silent, and Russian television stations are focusing on the violence in Catalonia."
- Serbia - Foreign Minister Ivica Dacic supported Spain, saying: "Our position is clear and principled, Spain is one of the greatest friends of Serbia...[in] the same position on the issue of the territorial integrity of Serbia."
- Slovenia – Prime Minister Miro Cerar was "concerned".
- Switzerland – The Foreign Office was prepared to mediate in the stalemate.
- Turkey – The Foreign Minister issued a statement on 3 October reading: "Ankara prioritises the territorial integrity of Spain." It further noted Turkey closely follows the "referendum initiative." It further warned against the violence used by Spanish police against voters. "During this process it is important to respect Spain's laws and avoid violence, the ministry said. We believe that Spain, which we have a history of close friendship and alliance relations, will overcome such tests and establish a national dialogue environment in the best way with a democratic approach."
- United Kingdom – Foreign Secretary Boris Johnson said the issue was a matter for the Spanish government and people and that it was important the Spanish constitution be respected and the rule of law upheld. A statement from the Foreign Office had earlier read: "The referendum is a matter for the Spanish government and people. We want to see Spanish law and the Spanish constitution respected and the rule of law upheld. Spain is a close ally and a good friend, whose strength and unity matters to us."
  - Scotland – First Minister Nicola Sturgeon called the U.K. Foreign Office's statement "shamefully weak." She added that "regardless of [one's] views on independence, we should all condemn the scenes being witnessed."
  - Wales – First Minister Carwyn Jones stated his condemnation on Twitter by writing: "Horrific scenes on the streets of #Catalonia today. When violence replaces democracy and dialogue there are no winners."
  - Conservative MP Peter Bone said: "If this has been a region of Russia they would have been jumping up and screaming at the Russians for being anti-democratic and how outrageous it was and dictatorial. I haven't heard a peep out of them. It does seem a very strange state of affairs. It's double standards, I'm afraid."
  - Labour leader and Leader of the Opposition Jeremy Corbyn asked Theresa May to intervene "to find political solution to the crisis".
  - Liberal Democrat leader Vince Cable urged Boris Johnson to make clear that the violence against voters was unacceptable. Liberal Democrat ex-MP for Cambridge Julian Huppert tweeted: "Madrid has dealt with this whole thing atrociously. There is no excuse for police brutality!".
  - UKIP newly elected leader Henry Bolton gave a suggestion for mediation and wrote on Twitter: "Catalonia has requested international mediation, I suggest @osce_odihr based in Warsaw would be ideal."
  - British Overseas Territories
    - Gibraltar – Chief Minister Fabian Picardo said: "I am very concerned to see violence in the streets of our neighbouring nation. The claim by Spain to the land that I call my home is anachronistic and remnant of a bygone era. But anyone who visits Gibraltar realizes it is far from anachronistic – it is modern, it is digital, it is thrusting and it is prosperous."
- Venezuela – President Nicolás Maduro criticized the Spanish police response to the referendum. In a televised statement, Maduro said "our hand goes out to the people of Catalonia. Resist, Catalonia! Latin America admires you".

=== Business ===
Moody's Investors Service has warned that the increased tensions over Catalonia's push for independence could hurt the country's overall debt worthiness. The agency said the "ratcheting-up of tensions has negative credit implications" that could be worsened if Catalonia's regional government declares independence after claiming victory in the referendum. It added that the probability of Catalan independence remains low, mainly because it remains unclear that a majority of Catalans actually want independence. It expects the sides to negotiate a deal for greater powers for the region. The agency further noted that Catalonia represents about a fifth of Spain's economy, with a high per capita GDP, so independence could seriously affect Spain's public finances.

Fitch Ratings announced that it would place Catalonia on "rating watch negative" (RWN) over uncertainties over the region's debt obligations. The rating agency explained that the stand-off with Spanish authorities and the possibility of Catalonia's independence "may lead to unforeseeable events, including a potential disruption of the state liquidity funds to Catalonia." It said however that this was not its "base case scenario" and that it expected that "current tensions will ease" and allow it to "resolve the RWN within the next six months". Another rating agency, S&P, also placed Catalonia on "CreditWatch with negative implications". It said that the "escalation" between Barcelona and Madrid "may damage the coordination and communication between the two governments, which is essential to Catalonia's ability to service its debt on time and in full." However it said it expected to "resolve the CreditWatch within the next three months."

Charles St-Arnaud, an investment strategist at Lombard Odier Asset Management, said: "The answer of politicians is key. The separatist movement has avoided calling independence, so that's putting the market in a wait-and-see mode." Jasper Lawler, head of research at London Capital Group, said: "The resolve of regional officials in Catalonia to announce independence from Spain has caught markets off guard."

President of the British Chamber of Commerce in Spain Christopher Dottie said that U.K. companies were monitoring events closely because they did not want to embark on new projects without knowing what the future held. They were aware that any separation implied costs and they would opt for whichever involved the least impact.

=== Media ===
The Guardian wrote:

Rajoy's subsequent choice to employ physical force to impose his will on civilians exercising a basic democratic right carried a chill echo of Spain's past and a dire warning for the future. That is dictatorship. Surely no one believes the cause of Catalan independence will fade away after Sunday's bloody confrontations that left hundreds injured. Rajoy's actions may have ensured, on the contrary, that the campaign enters a new, more radical phase, potentially giving rise to ongoing clashes, reciprocal violence, and copycat protests elsewhere, for example among the left-behind population of economically deprived Galicia. In Spain's Basque country, where Eta separatists waged a decades-long terror campaign that killed more than 800 people and injured thousands, the dream of independence is on ice – but not forgotten. The danger is that a new generation of younger Basques who feel ignored by Madrid, and repelled by what happened in Barcelona, may be tempted to revisit Eta's unilateral 2010 ceasefire and its subsequent disarmament.

The Guardian also added, on 20 October, the article "The Catalan case is persuasive. But that way lies ruin (Natalie Nougayrède), who stated "...the 1 October referendum was hardly a model of sound, democratic expression. Only a minority of Catalans took part (turnout was 43%), and its organisation ran counter to Catalonia's own legislation. The two laws that led to it were voted through without the two-thirds majority the Catalan charter (the Estatut) requires for such a momentous reform process. Nor was the vote overseen by the regional constitutional court. The Council of Europe, Europe's democracy watchdog, said it did not abide by its fundamental criteria. Reporters without Borders, an organisation that scrutinises freedom of the press, denounced the harassment and intimidation – sometimes physical – of reporters who did not toe the pro-independence line. These points often get drowned out in the romantic wave of commentary that Catalonia and its history can understandably inspire, within and beyond Spain. Catalan radicals have taken to social media to try to raise support across Europe, using English-language videos."

BBC Diplomatic Correspondent James Landale asked: "How could an EU that opposed independence for, say, the Kurds or Crimea suddenly decide to welcome it for the Catalans? The EU would find it hard to back a vote for self-determination that had been so clearly ruled illegal by a country's constitutional court." Deutsche Welle drew parallels between Catalonia and European separatist movements in the Basque country, Scotland, Flanders, Padania, South Tyrol, and Corsica.

The New York Times criticised both Rajoy and Puigdemont for their belligerency. It added "[I]n European sovereignty, not in more national flags, lies the bright future of every European of good will."

CNN mentioned the violence as "terrifying, but it can and should be a lesson for the world about the importance of upholding the spirit of democracy and the protection of human rights." It concluded: "But [sic] the United Nations at large can do more. Through official means, it should send a message to any actors who instigate, dictate, justify and/or perpetrate violations of fundamental rights. It should also advise that all concerned parties put human rights, accountability and the protection of civilians at the center of political negotiations and peace processes. Let's hope our institutions -- national, regional and global -- pass the test of protecting democratic values in Catalonia."

The Africa Confidential wrote: "Religion, poverty and oil exacerbate ethnic and tribal divisions in Nigeria, which is why people in its southern region once known as the self-declared Republic of Biafra have a keen eye on Catalonian secessionists." It added that "...There is a nightmare scenario under which south-east secessionists link up with Niger Delta militants and try to stall the economy. Some officials speculate about the risks of militants from the Delta and the south-east teaming up with campaigners from Anglophone south-west Cameroon who are demanding an independent state, known as Ambazonia."

=== Individuals ===
On 2 September, following violent police clashes, co-founder of Wikipedia Jimmy Wales wrote on Twitter: "Without any reservations I condemn the violence against peaceful voters in the Catalan referendum."

Dr Marina Bock, a lecturer in civil engineering at the University of Wolverhampton who was born in Barcelona and studied at the city's Polytechnic University of Catalonia, said: "I was born in the city of Barcelona in Catalonia where I spent almost 30 years of my life before moving to the U.K. a few years ago. My feelings are hard to describe but I would say they are a combination of sadness and anger. I don't consider myself a strong Catalan nationalist but would strongly defend my language, culture, traditions and people which the Spanish government seems not to have been respecting as they should, especially since Mariano Rajoy['s] party came back into [the] government in 2011 with an unduly anti-Catalanism approach. For instance, imposing Spanish as a main language in schools as they believe Catalans are able to speak Catalan only. As a person educated in Barcelona, I absolutely have no problems communicating in both Spanish and Catalan. Neither do most of the educated Catalan population."

Aleksei Martynov, a Russian political commentator, argued in an opinion piece for Izvestia that the EU was rattled by the Brexit referendum and was now using "all possible means" to hold the bloc together. "Emerging from the stupor of animal fear, the Euro-bureaucrats have cursed the very word 'referendum' and today are ready, having transcended their own rhetorical principles, to repressively defend the European Union in its current form through all possible means, but by the hands of national governments, today's events in Spanish Catalonia in any case mark the end of European political romanticism. Harsh, gray days lie ahead. Orwell lives."
