= Societat Civil Catalana =

Spanish unionist organisation

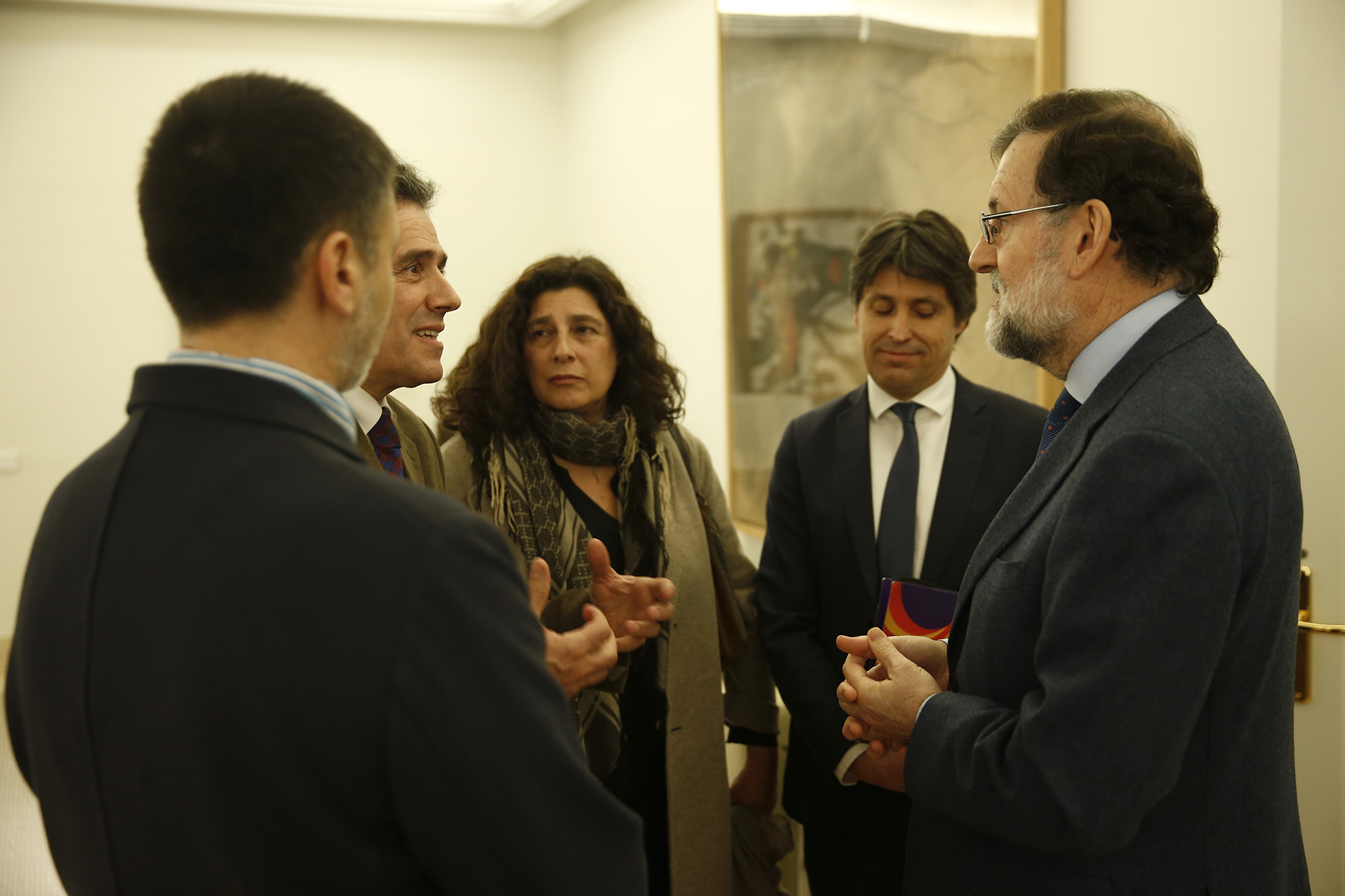
- Former President of Spain and People's Party, Mariano Rajoy, receiving managers of SCC. From left to right: Óscar Uceda, Álex Ramos, Miriam Tey, José Rosiñol and Mariano Rajoy.
- Formation: 7 April 2014; 12 years ago
- Type: NGO
- Purpose: Spanish unionism
- Location: Paseo de Gracia N. 26, 4-2 08007, Barcelona
- Official languages: Catalan, Spanish
- President: Elda Mata Miró-Sans
- Website: Official website

Societat Civil Catalana (SCC, "Catalan Civil Society") is a Spanish unionist organization based in Barcelona. Launched in 2014, SCC seek to counter the Catalan independence movement.

== Structure ==
Elda Mata Miró-Sans is the current president, since April 3, 2022. Former presidents have been Rafael Arenas, Mariano Gomà, and Josep Ramon Bosch. SCC board members have different ideological backgrounds and are or have been associated to pro-union parties such as People's Party of Catalonia, Citizens and Socialists' Party of Catalonia. SCC has delegations in Barcelonès, Baix Llobregat and Tarragona.

== Creation ==
SCC was legally constituted on April 7, 2014. SCC stated that its goal is to be a transverse platform against separatism. On April 23 of the same year SCC had its official presentation to the public at the Victoria Theater in Barcelona. Susana Beltrán, who became a deputy of Citizens in Catalonia's Parliament, was the host of the event and Bosch, Domingo and Coll delivered the keynote speeches. José Rosiñol was the moderator and also member of the provisional executive office. Other members from the provisional executive office who also attended the event were Isabel Porcel, Ana María Lindin and Ferran Brunet. The event was attended by members of mainstream political parties with representation in the Spanish parliament such as PP, Citizens, PSC and UPyD Some founding members were members of the Somatemps, including its first president Josep Ramon Bosch, Javier Barraycoa, Josep Alsina and Xavier Codorniu. SCC also received support from Jorge Moragas and Miram Tey. Several leading supporters of the group has far right connections or sympathies.

== Awards ==
- In November 2014, eight months after its creation, SCC received from the European Parliament the European Citizen's Prize. The prize is awarded to "projects and initiatives that facilitate cross-border cooperation or promote mutual understanding within the EU." SCC was nominated by the Catalan People's Party MEP Santiago Fisas.
- In January 2018 SCC received from socialist Ximo Puig, president of the government of Valencia (Generalitat Valenciana), the Manuel Broseta Foundation Award to Co-existence without the presence nor acceptance of Compromís and Podemos.

== Activism ==
- On 11 September 2014 (National Day of Catalonia) it organized its first big concentration event in Tarragona.
- On 12 October 2014 (Día de la Hispanidad), gathering 40,000 demonstrators in Barcelona against independence, according to the local police spokesman.
- On 8 October 2017, it mobilized hundreds of thousands of people (350,000 according to local police chief of press, more than 1 million according to the organization itself) in a demonstration at Barcelona. Former EU Parliament president and current Foreign Affairs Minister, socialist Josep Borrell, and Nobel Award Laureate Mario Vargas Llosa, delivered closing speeches at the demonstration.
- On 12 October 2017, a total of 65,000 people attended to a demonstration call made by SCC.
- On 29 October 2017, 300,000 people according to local police (one million according to SCC) marched against the unilateral declaration of independence by the Catalan Regional Government. Manifesto speakers were Josep Borrell and Francisco Frutos, former leader of the Spanish Communist Party which condemned his participation in the demonstration and stated that he did not represent them in any way.
- On 5 December 2017, SCC denounces in Brussels an alleged indoctrination in schools of Catalonia in Catalan nationalism.
- On 18 March 2018, 7,000 people were present in another demonstration. In this demonstration, former French Prime Minister Manuel Valls delivered the closing speech.
- On 8 October 2023, SCC organised a demonstration against the Spanish government's pardon to those involved in the 2017 secession attempt. This demonstration was attended by PP leader Alberto Núñez Feijóo, VOX leader Santiago Abascal and the president of the Madrid region, Isabel Díaz Ayuso (PP).

SCC demonstration calls have received cross-party support from Catalonia's Popular Party, PSC and Citizens and it is regarded by some as the leading anti-independence platforms in Catalonia along with the movement for Tabarnia.

SCC gave public support to a demonstration of the platform Tabarnia along with Vox and PxC.

In the first months of 2018 SCC started a round of meetings with Spanish politicians and political parties to discuss how to manage the Catalan independence movement in the context of the Spanish constitutional crisis. SCC established conversations with political party Cs (Citizens) and with the president of the government of Spain, Mariano Rajoy (president of People's Party). The organization also met with Susana Díaz, president of Andalusia and PSOE-A, and with Alberto Núñez Feijóo, president of Galicia and galician People's Party. Political parties En Marea and BNG were left out. In April, representatives of SCC met the leader of the Spanish socialist party PSOE Pedro Sanchez.

First proposed by Miriam Tey, Catalan Civil Society and Josep Ramon Bosch have formed a working group in order to negotiate with Manuel Valls his presentation to 2019 Spain's local elections as a Citizen's candidate.

Catalan Civil Society went to the European Parliament to claim that in Catalonia there is linguistic discrimination and that children rights are being violated. They also claimed the existence negative effects in children academic performance due to using Catalan as tuition language in the Catalan education system. This is contradicted by Republican Left of Catalonia former MEP Josep Maria Terricabras, who recalled that PISA report does not show any difference, as is the case of the last PISA report, Spanish regional tests and university admission tests. SCC are not the only ones making these claims. Some related media and other similar entities have self published documents claiming alleged negative effects of the current Catalan school system for Spanish-speakers, based on flawed according to some authors secondary reports analysing PISA and PIRLS tests. Professors of the University of Barcelona Jorge Calero (former President of the Higher Council for Evaluation of the Educational System of Catalonia) and Alvaro Choi published a complete report on the issue based on a detailed analysis of the data from the 2015 PISA reports, which reaches the conclusion that Spanish speakers obtain worse results than Catalan speakers all other variables been equal. As already stated, that report was found to have flaws according to some authors, concretely in its assumptions over the population of the statistical analysis, which are considered unverifiable. The same problems were found in another report from Calero about PIRLS.

== Criticism ==
Regarding the alleged instrumentation of public education (that is, alleged indoctrination with language immersion or syllabus), this has been a common topic among spanishist entities. On the other hand, Catalan public education syllabus depends on the central government of Spain too, whose history syllabus has been modified to accommodate the political views of the elected central government. SCC themselves published a report with a list of alleged indoctrination cases on schools. A prominent case listed in that report happened at Sant Andreu de la Barca. Later on the local section of the political party Citizens of that city denied the indoctrination claims.

The Procés and factors influencing opinions with respect to Catalan independence has been the subject of scientific publications. Polls done in both public and private schools don't support the idea of schools being able to influence the youth political views, the most important factors being their social networking revolving around their own parents, children and neighbours. Subsequent academic research points out that schools can't be the source of the increase of Catalan separatism either.

And yet, numerous and abundant publications echo the existence of data that attest to the indoctrination and instrumentalization of Catalan schools in favor of the Catalan nationalist and pro-independence ideology.

Javier Barraycoa, former member of SCC and founder of Somatemps, has claimed that SCC received funding from the central government of Spain to support the pro-union demonstrations of the 8th and 12 October 2017. RENFE subsidized 50% of the cost of 245 train tickets for the Diada public act of SCC on September 11, 2014, in Tarragona. Josep Alsina has claimed that SCC receives grants from the Joan Boscà Foundation to which Catalan businesses has provided funding.

The Spanish online newspaper Público claims the balance sheet presented by SCC “lacks transparency” given that whilst SCC has only 75 members and 4,000 collaborators SCC, it managed to collect one million euros in funding in 2014. The members only account for 1.5% of money contributions. Another 1.5% comes from gathering posts and urns. The rest, 97%, comes from private donations. However, audits have found no indication of wrongdoing. Félix Revuelta, founder and principal stakeholder of Naturhouse, stated that he and many other businessmen provided financial support to SCC.

Some members of Societat Civil Catalana have been known to be part of Somatemps, a collective considered part of the far-right. Josep Ramon Bosch, Xavier Codorniu, José Domingo, Ferran Brunet and Joaquim Coll have attended or taken part in events from organisations with the same political alignment: Somatemps, PxC, Vox, National Francisco Franco Foundation, National Democracy and Republican Social Movement. These groups have attended mass demonstrations organized by the SCC, facts to which SCC responded condemning violence and clarified they cannot control who attends to their demonstrations.

In 2015 Catalan separatist parties ERC and CiU, together with the Catalan Green party ICV, sent a joint letter to Socialist MEP Sylvie Gillaume, then vice-president of the European Parliament, protesting the awarding of European Citizen's Price to Societat Civil Catalana. In the letter, they claimed that the SCC has links with Catalan far-right groups and promotes xenophobe and extremist ideas. However, SCC received the award in February 2015, triggering another protest letter. Socialist MEP Gillaume dismissed this second letter, arguing that the award had already obtained approval at the Spanish and EU levels with the support from representatives from PP, PSOE, and UPyD. In her award ceremony speech, Ms. Guillaume stressed that the award was given in particular to the fight against fascism and in favor of freedom of expression, tolerance and intercultural dialogue. Members of the European Parliament from PSOE and PP Ramón Jaúregui and Santiago Fisas were decisive in the argument to dismiss the accusations. Catalan Parliament, with a separatist majority, accepted a proposal from ICV to file a complaint to the European Parliament. PP, PSC and Citizens voted against the proposal, while ICV-EUiA, ERC, CUP and CiU supported the proposal.

The Court of First Instance 41 of Barcelona ruled on 10 January 2019 that there is no evidence that SCC, as an organisation, is advocating Francoism or Nazism. It sentenced the associations Comissió de la Dignitat, Amical de Mauthausen, SOS Racisme de Catalunya, Fundació Privada Congrés de Cultura Catalana, Fundació Catalunya and Marcus Pucnik to pay 15,000 euros in compensation to SCC, not to say again that the organisation is advocating fascist movements in its actions and, if the sentence is final, to publish the headline and verdict of the sentence in La Vanguardia. The convicts were signatories of the public statement "La Societat Civil de Catalunya, per la dignitat", the subject of the sentence. The judge did not assess the relationships of the different members of SCC with far-right organizations such as Somatemps, MSR or the Francisco Franco National Foundation, understanding that what its members do does not affect the official acts of the entity. He also excluded the journalistic investigation book "Desmuntant Societat Civil Catalana" for being published after the events reported, that is, after the publication of the manifesto that the judge understands to say that SCC is supporting fascism. In no case did the judge doubt the veracity of the documentation provided.

== See also ==
- Assemblea Nacional Catalana, an organization which seeks political independence of Catalonia from Spain.
- Òmnium Cultural, a Catalan Civil Association created to promote Catalan language and spread Catalan culture.
- Jordi Borràs i Abelló, photojournalist who wrote Desmuntant Societat Civil Catalana and Plus Ultra.
- Spanish nationalism, political ideology asserting the unity of Spain.
