= Ramon Barnils i Folguera =

Ramón Barnils Folguera
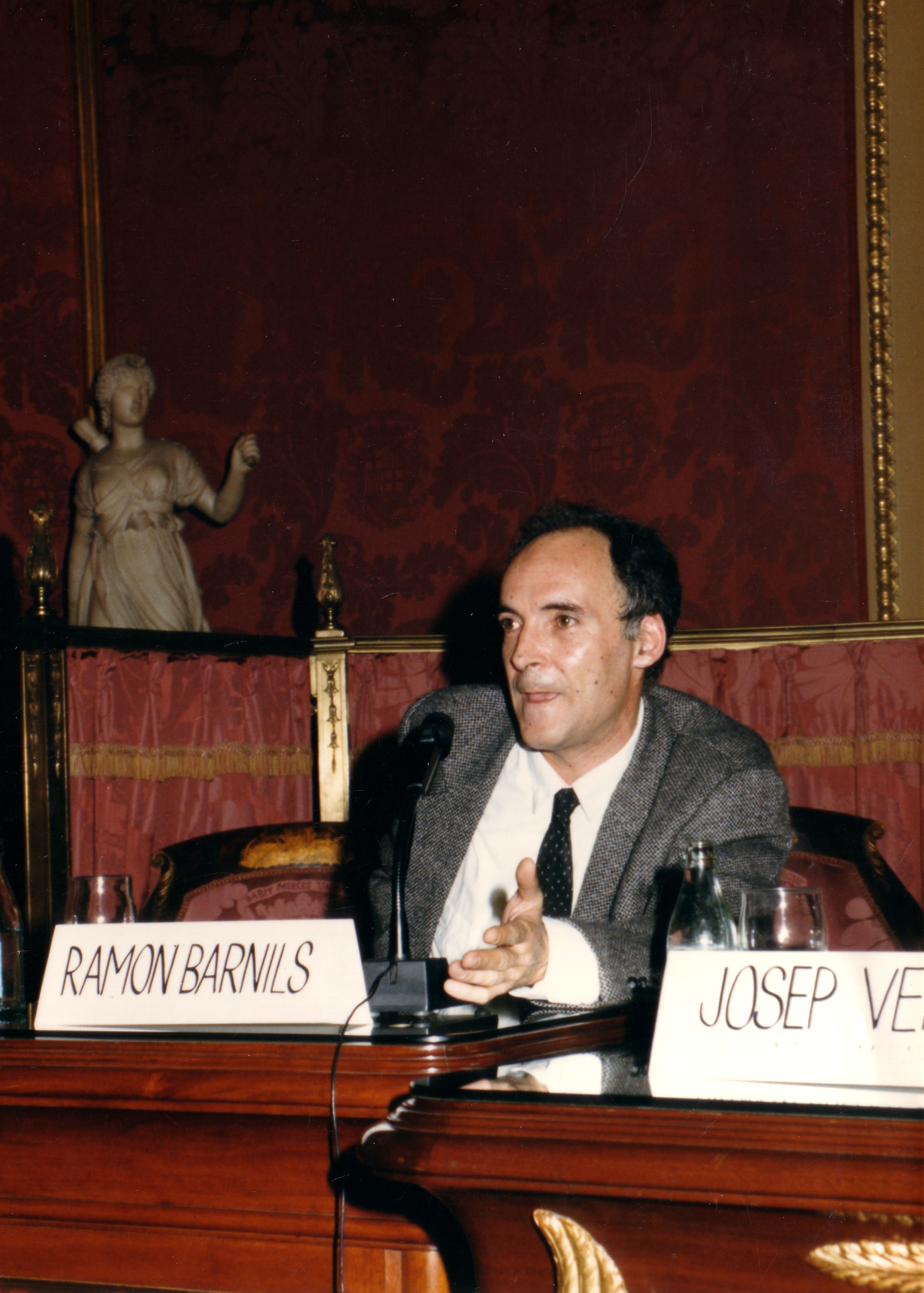
- Born: October 13, 1940 Sabadell, Barcelona, Spain
- Died: March 14, 2001 (aged 60) Reus, Barcelona, Spain
- Occupation: Journalist, translator
- Notable works: History of the Iberian Liberation Movement

Ramón Barnils Folguera (Sabadell, (Note: Even though Barnils was born in Sabadell, he lived and was raised in Sant Cugat del Vallès.) Barcelona, Spain, October 13, 1940 – Reus, Barcelona, Spain, March 14, 2001) was a Spaniard journalist and translator. He worked for several media such as Tele/eXpres, El Noticiero Universal, Agència EFE, El Temps, and La Vanguardia. He helped publish the satirical magazine El be negre amb potes rosses. He also helped publish Ajoblanco, Solidaridad Obrera and participated in Catalunya Ràdio from the day of its foundation.

He worked as a teacher of future journalists at university from 1976 to 1985, where he focused on the importance of previous research in order to write good articles. From that position, he was able to write the history of the Iberian Liberation Movement.

== Bibliography ==
- Altarriba, Laia (2014). "Retrat d'una vida". Vint i Ramon Barnils (in Catalan). DAU. ISBN 978-84-941031-3-1.
- Barnils, Ton (2014). "Retrat d'una vida". Vint i Ramon Barnils (in Catalan). Altarriba, Laia: DAU. ISBN 978-84-941031-3-1.
- Van Campen, Jordi (November 16, 2013). "L'ofici de Ramon Barnils". Nuvol.com (in Catalan).
- Grifell Sala, Quirze (1987). "Ramon Barnils, mestre de periodistes". L'Erol: Revista cultural del Berguedà (in Catalan) (núm. 20). ISSN 0212-0445.
