= Katoikos.eu =

Web-based magazine

Katoikos.world (previously Katoikos.eu)
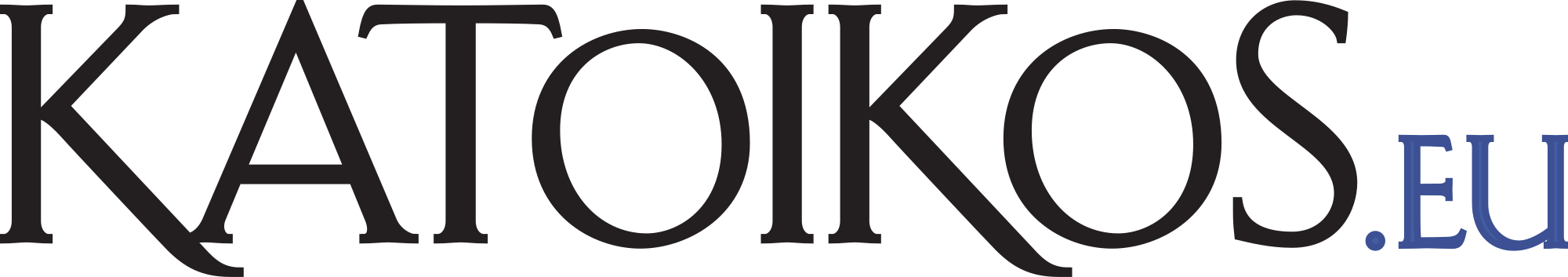
- Type: Online magazine
- Owner(s): Katoikos S.L. SL, FOGGS, Global Souths Perspective Network
- Founder(s): José-Luis Herrero, Georgios Kostakos
- Publisher: José-Luis Herrero, Georgios Kostakos
- Editor-in-chief: Georgios Kostakos
- Founded: 2014
- Website: katoikos.world

Katoikos.world, previously Katoikos.eu is a web-based magazine with a newspaper format. It provides commentary, analysis and cartoons on international affairs from a European and cosmopolitan perspective.

It was launched in 2014. According to its founders, the goal is to reach normal citizens across Europe, get them interested in European affairs in the largest possible sense, and encourage them to engage in horizontal dialogue.

== Name ==
The publication's title derives from the Greek word katoikos, which means resident or inhabitant, in this case of the EU.

== Organisation ==
Katoikos.eu was launched in 2014 by José-Luis Herrero and Georgios Kostakos as a Madrid-based private company (Katoikos SL). Until October 2016, it had two parallel editions, one in English and one in Spanish. Since then it is published only in English, with occasional articles in other European languages, including Spanish, French and German. The publication claims financial independence, also from the EU institutions.

== Content ==
The publication features its "home-grown" cartoonist, Pascal Hansens, who has developed his own recognisable style that combines dark humour and political astuteness.

Katoikos.eu authors and their opinion pieces range from the free and unconventional to the constructively critical from inside the establishment. It is a place where different but interesting and knowledgeable people meet to express their views on the politics of the EU and its neighbourhood, but also cinema and daily life.
