= Josep Ramon Bosch =

Spanish businessperson

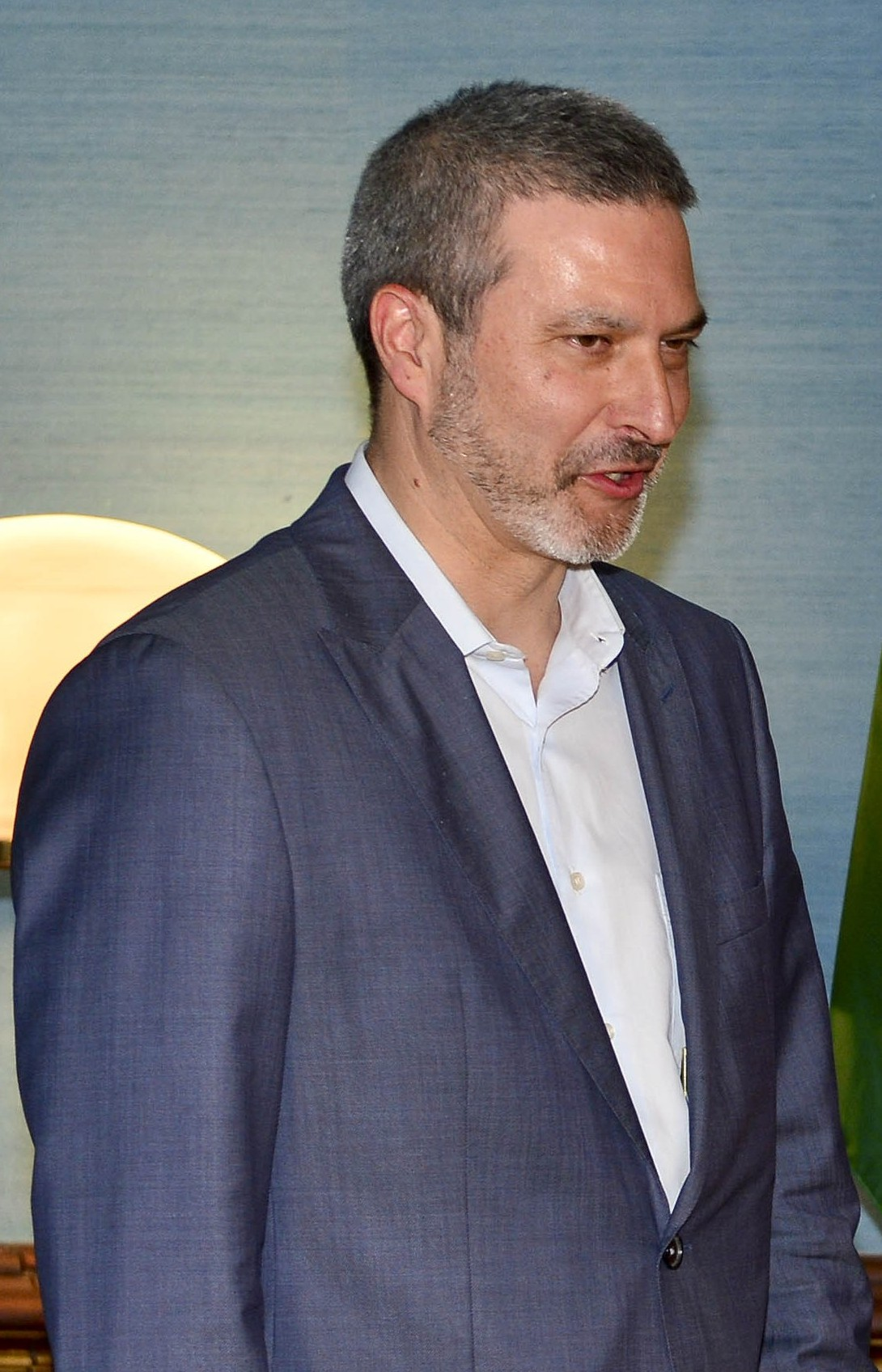
- Born: 1963 (age 62–63); Santpedor, Spain
- Occupations: Political activist and entrepreneur
- Political party: People's Party

Josep Ramon Bosch i Codina (born in Santpedor in 1963) is a Spanish businessman and political activist focused on supporting Spanish nationalism. He belonged to the People's Party (PP). He is the founder of Somatemps, a far-right group that defends "the Hispanic identity of Catalonia", and presided the unionist platform of the Catalan Civil Society (2014-2015). He has also participated in La Contra Deportiva, an online newspaper dedicated to RCD Espanyol, led by General Secretary of Platform for Catalonia, Roberto Hernando. He was in charge of convincing Manuel Valls for campaigning in 2019 Spain's local elections as candidate for Citizens.

In September 2015 he was accused of maintaining a channel on YouTube where he uploaded videos of far-right ideological content under the pseudonym of Josep Codina. Shortly afterwards, he announced his resignation as president of the Catalan Civil Society alleging personal motives. Two weeks before, a lawsuit against Bosch had been filed for the insults and threats that he allegedly made from an anonymous Facebook profile. In court, he refused to declare and finally the case was archived for having prescribed the offense. Involved in the same timeline were publications of fascist videos with his voice under a false Facebook account which he owned. Bosch has also participated in acts of the Francisco Franco National Foundation. Societat Civil Catalana, which at the time Bosch presided, claimed he was accompanying his father.

Bosch contributed to the prologue of the book "El hijo de la Africana" (The son of the African) written by Pau Guix.
