= Education in Catalan =

Programmes of education in Catalan language exist today principally in Andorra and the Catalan-speaking autonomous communities of Spain.

After the Spanish transition to democracy in 1978, the Catalan language was restored in the sphere of education in Spain for millions of speakers. The introduction of Catalan varied considerably depending on the territory. In Catalonia and the Balearic Islands a linguistic model was adopted according to which Catalan is the main vehicular language. A radically different model was followed in the Valencian Community in which parents are, in theory, able to choose which language their children are educated in. There also is some privately funded Catalan language education in Roussillon France.

== History ==
Catalan was removed from the sphere of education between the 17th and 20th centuries, as the various states in which the language is spoken imposed obligatory education in the respective state language. Nevertheless, the country's different social sectors were aware that education is a decisive sphere both for the country's progress and for the language's vitality, meaning the demands to introduce Catalan into education and the complaints concerning its relegation were frequent throughout all of this period.

The situation started to change, above all in Catalonia, in the early 20th century, with the rise of Catalan nationalism; firstly on the part of the Commonwealth of Catalonia and later the Autonomous Republican Government. In the Decree of April 29, 1930, Second Spanish Republic minister Marcelino Domingo allowed the use of Catalan in primary schools. It was in fact Catalonia's Statute of Autonomy of 1932 which for the first time introduced the teaching of Catalan and in Catalan at all levels of education. However, the period of autonomy was extremely brief, although its work laid the foundations that would allow, decades later, professional education sectors to maintain the Catalan language, even at the height of the Francoist Dictatorship, when the language was all but prohibited and its users persecuted.

In 1933, the Valencian variety of the language was first taught at the Hermitage of Saint Paul of Albocàsser. In summer that year four prominent teachers —Carles Salvador, Enric Soler i Godes, Antoni Porcar i Candel and Francesc Boix Senmartí—, and 24 8-to-13-year-old male students gathered together.

The recovery of democracy and grant of autonomy in the Catalan-speaking territories included in the Kingdom of Spain allowed the recovery of the language in the sphere of education, an example that was to stimulate the rest of the linguistic domain. However, the recovery was highly uneven around the territory, and the regional and administrative fragmentation means that today, the position of Catalan in the world of education varies hugely depending on the location in question.

== By territories ==
In general terms, it can be said that the introduction of Catalan as a subject was completed, at least in Catalonia, the Valencian Community and the Balearic Islands, during the Spanish transition to democracy. In fact, all of the statutes of autonomy and the first linguistic laws paid special attention to learning and the educational use of Catalan, since a principle was set that meant all of the population had to be competent in the two official languages so as to avoid inequalities or social splits on account of language. However, the linguistic school models developed in each territory differ considerably from each other.

=== Catalonia ===
In Catalonia, a unitary linguistic model has been formed with Catalan as the main vehicular language known as an "immersion", "conjunction" or "single tuition language" model, based on the notion that "everybody has the right to education in Catalan" and this language "must normally be used as vehicular language, and for university and non-university learning and teaching", as stated in article 35 of the Catalonia Statute of Autonomy of 2006. It was first developed in the law of 1983 "Llei de Normalització Lingüística" (Law of Linguistic Normalization) approved in by the Parliament of Catalonia. Closely afterwards the model model de conjunció en català (‘conjunction-in-Catalan model’) was deployed progressively around all Catalonia. At the time of 1986 the whole country was using Catalan as tuition language except for the subjects devoted to teach other languages, including Castilian. There are exemptions: the system recognises the right to receive primary education in Catalan and Spanish at the first school levels. Pupils joining the Catalan school system later can receive linguistic support if Catalan is not their first language. Teachers of subjects other than linguistics can use Castilian if they see fit. In 1998 the law saw some modifications. The Language Policy Act of 1998 integrated the model de conjunció en català as the sole school-related language policy in Catalonia. The model declared that Catalan is the language of normal use in education, the language of teaching and that of learning, and establishes that the two official languages must have a proper presence in curriculum.

The aim of the system is to prevent school segregation on linguistic grounds. This model of course requires the teachers to be able to express themselves in either of Catalonia's two official languages. In order to guarantee this point, in 1991 a law was approved governing access to the education sector, requiring teachers to have a level of Catalan and Castilian allowing them to perform their professional duties in accordance with the applicable legislation. This system has been praised by EU and UNESCO.

==== Criticism ====
Spanish nationalism and several organisations and political parties like People's Party of Spain and of Catalonia, Citizens, Catalan Civil Society and Somatemps are openly hostile to Catalonia's education system. They claim the system is unfair to Castilian speakers, and that Catalan adds an additional burden to non-Catalan pupils worsening their academic performance. However, there is a consensus from scientific, education and Catalan communities that the linguistic immersion model is indeed fair given the make up of the population living in Catalonia. In fact, evidence shows that Castilian grades of Catalonia's pupils are equal to or above average for Spain as a whole and there is no evidence of worse academic performance among non-Catalan pupils. Spanish nationalists also state that children are indoctrinated into Catalan nationalism. To the contrary, social studies found that children political-identification feelings are influenced by their parents and neighbourhood, not Catalonia's education system. Children living in neighbourhoods or going to schools located in neighborhoods with a high portion of migrants will be less prone to identify themselves as more Catalan than Spanish or only Catalan.

Catalonia's school model has been always a point of conflict with the political right in Spain. It has reached the Constitutional Court of Spain in 1994 and 2010, both times receiving a favorable ruling, not infringing Castilian-speaking children "right and duty to know Spanish". The 2010 ruling pointed out that Castilian "cannot be excluded" but that Catalan has to be "the centre of gravity". However, in 2013 the government of Spain, at that time led by the People's Party of Spain, passed a bill to increase the usage of Castilian as a language of instruction without specifying any percentage. The Catalan Government said they would take the bill to the Constitutional Court of Spain. In 2015 the Supreme Court ruled that at least 25% of school subjects at all levels have to use Castilian as teaching language for those parents who ask for it in order to guarantee that Castilian is not excluded. Some argue that the Supreme Court exceeded their competences as they can not modify laws approved by a Parliament. The educational community has stated that Castilian has never been excluded, with many teachers using it as the language of instruction in their lectures for the sake of flexibility and the laws already had exemptions for non-Catalan speakers. The continuous conflict around the educational system of Catalonia has contributed to the rise of the independence movement in Catalonia. Irene Rigau, education Minister of Catalonia in 2014, stated that "we need our own country in order to protect our language".

=== Balearic Islands ===
The linguistic school model in force in the Balearic Islands closely follows that of Catalonia, although the presence of Castilian there as a vehicular language is slightly more significant.

=== The Valencian Community ===
In Valencia, the teaching in Catalan started in 1983 with the Act of Use and Teaching of Valencian. It is based on a different model, known as “double line”, where parents can choose, as the vehicular language, between Catalan and Spanish, or mixed programmes. However, the administration has, very often, offered vacancies for the teaching in Catalan that fail to meet the strong demand. With the Decree of Plurilingualism in 2017, the Valencian Government tried for the first time to overcome the segregated model, so that each school offers a unique linguistic model. Initially, 54% of the institutions in the concerted public network chose Catalan as the vehicular language; 30%, the mixed programmes; and 13%, Castilian. Nevertheless, the Superior Court of Justice of the Valencian Community revoked the decree in the same year.

=== Andorra ===
The position of the Catalan language in the rest of the domain is also complex. Andorra, a state characterised by a high population of immigrants and people passing through, has various educational systems: the state school "Escola Andorrana", with Catalan as the main language and a strong presence of French as L2; the congregational schools, with Catalan as vehicular language; the Spanish system, with Castilian as the language medium; and the French system, with schools operating in this language.

=== Others ===
However, in the Franja de Ponent (Catalan-speaking area of Aragon), Catalan is merely an optional subject within the framework of an entirely Castilianised school system. In the town of Alghero (Sardinia, Italy) and Northern Catalonia (Pyrenees-Orientales, France), on the other hand, the teaching of Catalan as an optional subject coexists with certain educational initiatives in Catalan, under total or partial immersion. La Bressola, a network of private secondary schools in Northern Catalonia, offers education in Catalan.

Internationally, the Institut Ramon Llull is the official institution that oversees and select visiting professors that teach Catalan in approximately 150 universities (including 6.000 students) around the world. Besides, the network of Casals Catalans, such as Catalans UK or the Casal Català de Brussel·les, offer Catalan-language basic courses for children from primary school to adults.

== Demographics and Immigration ==
The linguistic school models of the Catalan-speaking territories have been shaken by waves of immigration in the 1990s and 2000s. These waves have altered the demographic composition of the pupils, to the point that in a decade foreign pupils have risen from 1% to more than 12%. These new pupils’ specific needs have motivated a succession of initiatives, such as the current "welcome schools", intended to make it easier to learn Catalan and to incorporate pupils newly arrived to the centre swiftly and in a personalised way. In 2007, there were a total of 1,081 such schools in Catalonia (636 in primary, 347 in secondary and 91 in assisted schools).
