= Somatemps =

- Formation: 2011; 15 years ago
- Founder: Josep Ramon Bosch
- Founded at: Santpedor
- Type: Collective
- Region served: Catalonia
- Members: 300
- Leader: Javier Barraycoa

Somatemps is a collective in Catalonia generally considered to be aligned with the far-right of Spain and also of being Spanish nationalist. They state to be committed to defend what they call "the hispanic identity of Catalonia". It was founded between 2011 and November 16, 2013 in Santpedor (Bages), where one of its founders, Josep Ramon Bosch, resides. The organisation is led by Javier Barraycoa. Currently Somatemps has around 300 members. The name of Somatemps was intended as word-play between "Som a temps"—"we are in time" (to stop independentism)—and the medieval Catalan militias Sometent. Somatemps has contributed to the creation of the association Catalan Civil Society.

== History ==
The first meeting of the entity was attended by both leaders of Platform for Catalonia (PxC) and the Republican Social Movement (MSR) with Juan Antonio Llopart, referents to Spain of parties such as the Greek Golden Dawn or the British National Party (BNP) and fascist movements such as Casa Pound. Somatemps is considered a far-right organization as per police and press sources.

Josep Alsina, who succeeded Bosch in Somatemps, when he was young he had been a member of the NSSP, the National Socialist Spanish Party or PENS, Partido Español Nacional Socialista in Spanish. PENS is a neo-Nazi organization created in Barcelona in 1970 and that had strong links with the secret services of the Superior Center of Defense Information (SECED), to the point that he could pay a local and print large runs of Nazi propaganda. The PENS came to commit attacks against bookstores, cinemas and theaters or distributors of books and publishing houses. Alsina also relates Jorge Buxadé Villalba, who has publicly acknowledged being a member of Catalan Civil Society, and who attended the 7th nomination of Falange Española de las Juntas de Ofensiva Nacional-Sindicalista (FE de las JONS) for Tarragona in the 1995 Catalan elections. Buxadé also became a State Attorney in September 2009, under the orders of the Spanish Government, when he challenged the consultation on the independence of Catalonia held in Arenys de Munt.

Somatemps also received the help of the lawyer Ariadna Hernández, at that time coordinating VOX in the demarcation of Barcelona and partner of one of the main drivers of the neofascist Casal Tramuntana, the councilor of PxC in l'Hospitalet de Llobregat Alberto Sánchez. Journalist Xavier Rius has even come to the point that Catalan Civil Society has had contacts with which he was delegated from the Spanish government in Catalonia, María de los Llanos de Luna, contacts but Bosch denies insistently despite the fact that there are photographs of the meeting.

The entity organized in December 2013 in Ripoll the 1st Congress of Spanish Catalanity in which the ex democratic socialist Joaquim Coll (member of Catalan Civil Society) and the People's Party Fernando Sánchez-Costa participated. He was also organizing protests in front of the Convergence and Union headquarters for the Pujol case, which was joined by Platform for Catalonia (PxC) before Parliament for the same reason.

Entities like Spain and Catalans in 2012 and Som Catalunya, Som Espanya in 2013, had wanted to publicly commemorate the Hispanic Day in Barcelona, but they did not manage to concentrate a sufficiently large attendance. Somatemps tried to take over the relief by convening the founding assembly on April 26 at the Poblet Monastery. A few days ago, an event had already been held in Barcelona where the presentation of the Catalan Civil Society was attended by, among others, the extreme right of Santiago Abascal, general secretary of the new Vox and Borja García-Nieto, the president of the Equestrian Circle. Somatemps did not adhere to the rally on October 12 in Barcelona although they were present.

In the context of the Spanish constitutional crisis and before the 1-O Catalan independence referendum of 2017, Somatemps participated in the so-called "ham operation" which sent 25 kg of Iberian ham and boxes of Rioja wine to the Spanish police and Civil Guard agents summoned in Barcelona by the Spanish government. The agents were allocated in hotels and ships docked in Barcelona's seaport. Somatemps organized a donation campaign which obtained around 2.500 euros of funds for the symbolic operation. Other actions in which Somatemps has participated involved bringing food to the policemen.

On November 18, 2017 Somatemps participated in a far-right demonstration supporting the Spanish unionism. This demonstration opposed a demonstration call made by Unit Against Fascism and Racism.

== Political agenda ==
This organisation is of Spanish Nationalist nature. They believe that a constitution is irrelevant for Spain, and despise the concepts of freedom and social equality expressed in the current constitution. They promote a Spain formed by a single political nation, alluding to what they believe was the old Spanish Empire. By proposing a single political nation, they deny the existence of national and regional identities in Spain and their corresponding political movements. This means they pursue some sort of imperialism with a single political nation ruling over the rest. In consequence, they are positioned against Catalan Nationalism.

Catalan education system which makes extensive use of Catalan as tuition language is also against Somatemps doctrine. Somatemps claims that pupils in Catalonia are indoctrinated into Catalan nationalism, something which multiple studies have refuted, identifying as main factors parental and neighbourhood influence. Other points which Somatemps defend to support Spanish Nationalism is to point out a supposed Catalan history revisionism.

Somatemps opposes to policies and campaigns aiding immigrants, including those from Red Cross and Plataforma per la Llengua which promote the learning of Catalan language among immigrants with the purpose of improving equality of opportunities.

Somatemps supports political catholicism, positioning the Catholic Church as a part of their view of a Spanish nation. LGBT campaigns are belittled as an offence to their religious sentiments. In their blog they have criticised the pride parade for indecency, published texts deeming laws which protect the LGBT group as unnecessary and indoctrinating, and texts against same-sex marriage and abortion.
