= List of political parties in Catalonia =

This article lists the political parties in Catalonia, their ideologies, leaders, number of MPs and their positions on Catalan independence. As of 2026, there are eight main political parties in Catalonia, each having political party representation in either the Parliament of Catalonia or at local government level.

== Parties represented in the Catalan Parliament ==
Party		Ideology	Political position	Catalan independence	Leader	MPs
Socialists' Party of Catalonia; Partit dels Socialistes de Catalunya	PSC–PSOE	Social democracy; Spanish unionism; Catalanism; Pro-Europeanism	Centre-left	No; Nominally defends the right of self-determination. Opposed in practice	Salvador Illa	42 / 135
Together for Catalonia; Junts per Catalunya	Junts	Catalan nationalism; Populism	Centre-right	Yes	Josep Rull	35 / 135
Republican Left of Catalonia; Esquerra Republicana de Catalunya	ERC	Social democracy; Republicanism; Green politics; Left-wing nationalism; Pro-Europeanism	Centre-left to left-wing	Yes	Oriol Junqueras	20 / 135
People's Party of Catalonia; Partit Popular de Catalunya	PPC	Conservatism; Christian democracy; Spanish unionism	Centre-right to right-wing	No	Alejandro Fernández	15 / 135
Vox; Vox	VOX	Spanish nationalism; National conservatism; Right-wing populism; Anti-immigration; Soft Euroscepticism	Far-right	No	Ignacio Garriga	11 / 135
Commons Unite; Comuns Sumar	Comuns Sumar	Eco-socialism; Left-wing populism; Catalanism	Left-wing	Right to self-determination	Jéssica Albiach	6 / 135
Popular Unity Candidacy; Candidatura d'Unitat Popular	CUP	Socialism; Eco-socialism; Pan-Catalanism; Anti-capitalism; Feminism; Euroscepticism	Left-wing to far-left	Yes	Xavier Pellicer	4 / 135
Catalan Alliance; Aliança Catalana	AC	Catalan nationalism; Right-wing populism; Anti-immigration; Soft Euroscepticism	Far-right	Yes	Sílvia Orriols	2 / 135

== Parties in coalition represented in the Catalan Parliament ==
Party		Ideology	Political position	Catalan independence	Platform / Senior party	MPs
Catalonia in Common; Catalunya en Comú	CatComú	Left-wing populism; Eco-socialism; Republicanism; Catalanism; Feminism	Left-wing	Right to self-determination	Comuns Sumar	5 / 135
Forward–Socialist Organisation of National Liberation; Endavant-OSAN	Endavant	Communism; Pan-Catalanism; Socialist feminism; Anti-fascism; Anti-capitalism Euroscepticism	Left-wing to far-left	Yes	CUP	1 / 135
Free People; Poble Lliure	PL	Socialism; Pan-Catalanism; Feminism; Anti-fascism	Left-wing to far-left	Yes	CUP	2 / 135
United to Advance; Units per Avançar	UA	Christian democracy; Catalanism; Spanish unionism; Anti-abortion	Centre-right	No; Nominally defends the right of self-determination	PSC–PSOE	1 / 135
Left Movement; Moviment d'Esquerres	MES	Social democracy; Progressivism	Centre-left	Yes	Junts	1 / 135

== Minor parties ==
Party		Ideology	Political position	Catalan independence
Animalist Party with the Environment; Partit Animalista Amb el Medi Ambient	PACMA	Animal welfare; Animal rights; Environmentalism; Veganism	Centre-left	Right to self-determination
Citizens; Ciutadans	Cs	Liberalism; Spanish nationalism	Centre-right	No
Communists of Catalonia; Comunistes de Catalunya	Comunistes.cat	Communism; Republicanism; Catalanism	Left-wing to far-left	Yes
Republican Alternative; Partit Republicà d'Esquerra - Alternativa Republicana de Catalunya	PRE - ALTER	Republicanism; Federalism; Eco-socialism; Socialist feminism	Left-wing	Right to self-determination
Zero Cuts–Green Group; Recortes Cero–Grupo Verde	Recortes Cero–GV	Anti-austerity; Eco-socialism; Feminism; Spanish unionism	Centre-left	No
National Front of Catalonia; Front Nacional de Catalunya	FNC	Catalan nationalism; Anti-immigration	Far-right	Yes
Pirates of Catalonia; Pirates de Catalunya	PIRATA.CAT	Pirate politics; Freedom of information; Direct democracy	Left-wing	Yes; Since 2017 supports independence based on the results of the Catalan independence referendum

== Defunct parties ==
- Catalan Action (AC, 1922–1939): Catalan nationalism, Social liberalism.
- Unified Socialist Party of Catalonia (PSUC, 1936–1997): Communism, Catalanism.
- Socialist Party of National Liberation (PSAN, 1968–2015): Communism, Catalan independence.
- Convergence and Union (CiU, 1978–2015): Catalanism, Liberalism.
  - Democratic Convergence of Catalonia (CDC, 1974–2016): Catalanism, Conservative liberalism.
  - Democratic Union of Catalonia (UDC, 1931–2017): Catalanism, Christian democracy.
- Initiative for Catalonia Greens (ICV, 1987-2021): Eco-socialism, Catalanism, Republicanism.
- Platform for Catalonia (PxC, 2002–2019): Spanish unionism, Nativism.

== See also ==
- History of political Catalanism
