= Jaume Farrerons =

Spanish philosopher and political activist

- Born: 1961 (age 64–65); Barcelona, Spain
- Political party: Plataforma Nueva Europa (1988-1989); Platform for Catalonia (2002–2003); Citizens (mid-2000s); National Republican Party (2006-2007); National Left of Workers (2010-2015); Plataforma Democrática per Catalunya (2015)

Education
- Education: University of Barcelona (BA, PhD)
- Thesis: Verdad y muerte. Filosofía frente a cosmovisión en el primer Heidegger (1919-1929) (2019)
- Doctoral advisor: Miguel Ángel Granada (PhD advisor)

Jaume Farrerons Sánchez (born 1961) is a Spanish philosopher and political activist from Catalonia. He was the founding ideologue and first general secretary of Platform for Catalonia.

== Biography ==
=== Academic career ===
Farrerons holds a degree in philosophy from the University of Barcelona. Between 2002 and 2004 he co-authored, with José Luis Arce Carrascoso, a series of journal articles on Heidegger's philosophy of history, facticity, and hermeneutics, published in Logos: Anales del Seminario de Metafísica, Endoxa: Series Filosóficas, and Convivium: revista de filosofía, as well as a chapter on Jürgen Habermas's interpretation of Heidegger, published in a festschrift for the philosopher Joaquín Lomba.

In 2019 he completed a PhD in philosophy at the University of Barcelona. His dissertation, Verdad y muerte: filosofía frente a cosmovisión en el primer Heidegger (1919–1929) ("Truth and Death: Philosophy versus Worldview in the Early Heidegger"), was supervised by Miguel Ángel Granada. Jaume reported that part of his doctoral thesis was plagiarized by one of his professors in mid-2011.

According to spanish philosophers Francisco Vázquez García and Álvaro Castro Sánchez, discusses Farrerons's doctoral thesis specifically, describing its tone toward scholars who link Heidegger's philosophy to Nazism as even more forceful than that of other academic critics the book surveys. According to the authors, the thesis argues for the independent philosophical value of Heidegger's concept of Sein zum Tode ("being-toward-death"), a concept that scholars studying the philosopher's Nazi ties have characterized as leading directly to a justification of the Holocaust. The authors write that Farrerons accuses three prominent scholars in this field (Emmanuel Faye, Víctor Farías, and Julio Quesada) of adopting what he calls a "perspectiva judicial" (prosecutorial perspective) aimed at banning the teaching of Heidegger's work, describing their arguments in harsh terms and, in the case of Quesada, specifically rejecting his portrayal of the economist Werner Sombart, a prominent follower of Marx, as an inspiration for Heidegger's antisemitism.

=== Political career ===
His political career began in 1976 when he joined the Socialist Youth of Catalonia, the youth organization of the Catalan Federation of the PSOE; the following year, he joined the Falange Auténtica. In 1987, he formed the Plataforma Nueva Europa with the former Trotskyist Juan Coloma, an organization he left after Ernesto Milá became involved. He wrote the program for the Alternativa Europea movement, despite never joining the group.

Jaume spent most of his career as a prison officer, eventually becoming the founder of the Catalan Democratic Association of Prison Officers (catalan: Associació Democràtica Catalana de Funcionaris de Presons, ADECAF) in 1996.

In 2002, Farrerons took part in founding Platform for Catalonia (PxC), a party built around the leadership of Josep Anglada. He wrote the party's founding programmatic declaration and was named its first general secretary. Farrerons left the party and the post in 2003, alleging that it was "controlled behind the scenes by the most stale and reactionary elements of the Spanish far right". A PxC rally in the Sant Andreu district of Barcelona on 13 May 2003, at which Farrerons was billed to speak, was disrupted by clashes with counter-demonstrators.

Farrerons briefly joined Citizens in the party's early years. He officially founded the National Left of Workers (Spanish: Izquierda Nacional de los Trabajadores, INTRA) on 13 October 2010 with its address in Figueres. Under INTRA's banner he headed the list of candidates for mayor of Figueres in the 2015 Spanish local elections in Catalonia. In 2017, Farrerons filed a criminal complaint against the mayor of Figueres, Marta Felip, over her role in the Catalan independence referendum, for which she faced a disobedience charge.

== Selected works ==
- Farrerons, Jaume; Arce Carrascoso, José Luis (2002). "De la hermenéutica a la acción comunicativa: entre la experiencia de la nada y la experiencia del tú." Logos: Anales del Seminario de Metafísica, no. 35, pp. 241–272. ISSN 1575-6866.
- Farrerons, Jaume; Arce Carrascoso, José Luis (2002). "Para una ontología de la historia: el sujeto de la historicidad." Endoxa: Series Filosóficas, no. 16, pp. 65–86. ISSN 1133-5351.
- Farrerons, Jaume; Arce Carrascoso, José Luis (2003). "La 'experiencia de la facticidad' en Heidegger, frente a la 'impresión de la realidad' en Zubiri." Convivium: revista de filosofía, no. 16, pp. 117–139. ISSN 0010-8235.
- Farrerons, Jaume; Arce Carrascoso, José Luis (2004). "Filosofía e ideología en la interpretación habermasiana de Heidegger." In Las raíces de la cultura europea: ensayos en homenaje al profesor Joaquín Lomba. Zaragoza: Prensas Universitarias de Zaragoza, pp. 371–396. ISBN 84-7733-687-3.
- Farrerons, Jaume (2012). Verdad y muerte I. Introducción a los fundamentos del nacionalismo revolucionario. Madrid: Editorial Barbarroja.
- Farrerons, Jaume (2019). Verdad y muerte: filosofía frente a cosmovisión en el primer Heidegger (1919–1929) (PhD dissertation). University of Barcelona.
- Farrerons, Jaume (2023). "La función de la muerte como instancia constituyente del 'dasein'." In Filosofía y experiencia de la vida: XXVIII Encuentro Internacional, pp. 147–160. ISBN 978-84-1311-776-8.
- Farrerons, Jaume (2025). "La fonamentació del nacionalisme." In Actes del VI Congrés Català de Filosofia, Manresa 2023, ed. Bernat Torres, Marta Palacín, and Conrad Vilanou. Barcelona: Societat Catalana de Filosofia / Institut d'Estudis Catalans, pp. 67–78. ISBN 978-84-9965-813-1.
- Farrerons, Jaume (2026). "Superhombre y ser para la muerte." In Humanidad en vilo: ¿animales?, ¿máquinas?, ¿dioses?, coord. Tomás Domingo Moratalla, Noé Expósito Ropero, and Melissa Hernández Iglesias, pp. 89–96. ISBN 978-84-1070-468-8.
