= Jaume Vives =

Spanish journalist, activist and writer

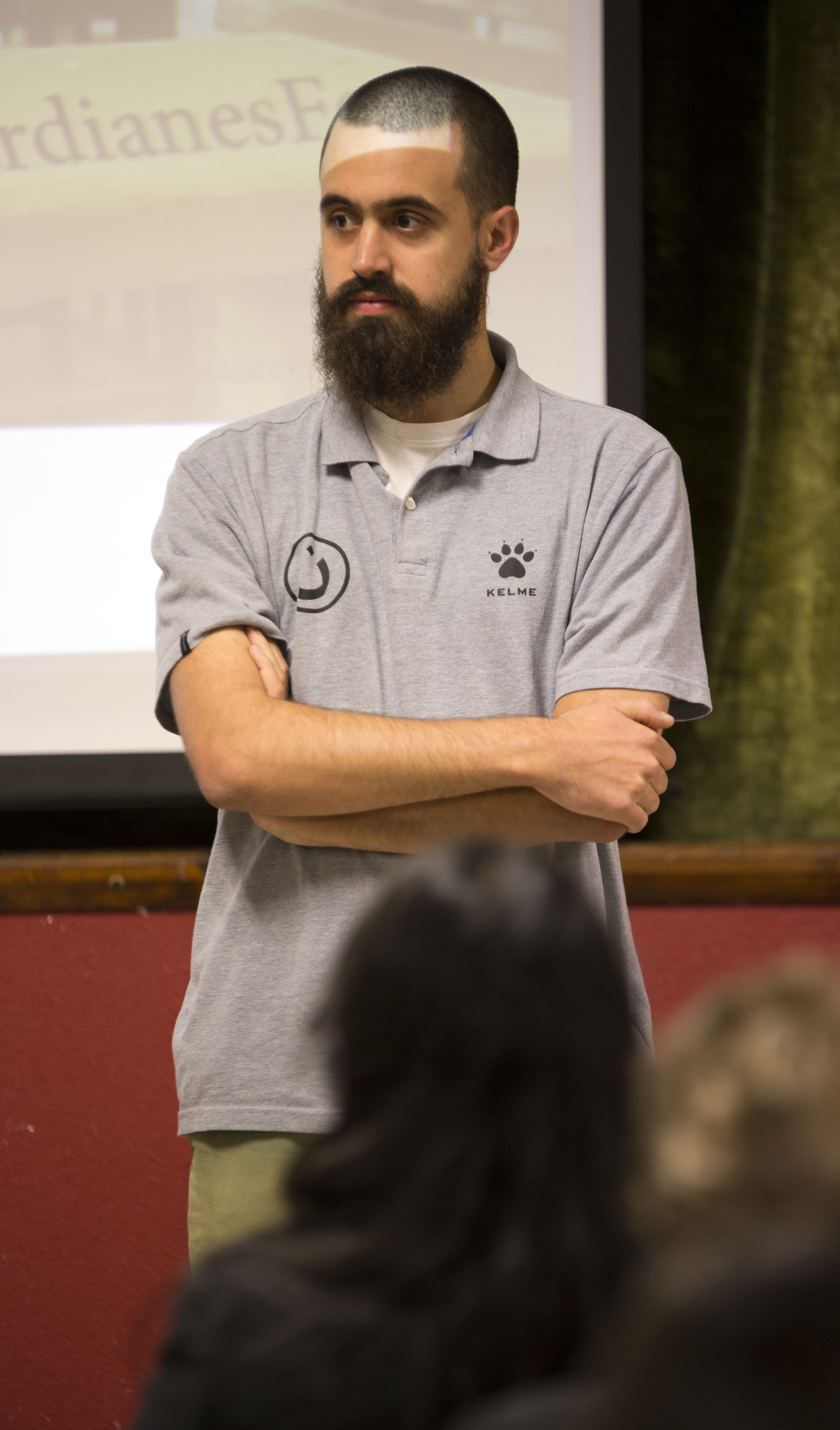
Jaume Vives in Íscar on 6 November 2015

Jaume Vives Vives (born 5 June 1992, in Barcelona) is a Spanish journalist, activist and writer. He directs the digital newspaper El Prisma. He is also one of the promoters of Tabarnia, a gerrymandering fictional region of Catalonia.

From El Prisma he has given voice to Josep Anglada, Santiago Abascal, Rafael López-Diéguez and Ignacio Arsuaga, leaders of Platform for Catalonia, Vox, Spanish Alternative and Hazte Oír, respectively.

He is also known by his ultraconservative views, described as islamophobic. Vives has defended "the Islam and the gender ideology [sic] are the main tool of Satan in our times". Besides, he has also been directly linked with the far-right blog Dolça Catalunya, that contains anti-Catalanist, ultra-Catholic and discriminatory, mockery articles.

== Books ==
- Las putas comen en la mesa del rey (2013): A collection of ten stories of homeless people in Barcelona.
- Pobres pobres (2014): About his experience living eight days among the poor in the streets of Barcelona.
- Guardianes de la Fe (2015)
- Viaje al horror del estado islámico (2015)
- Tabarnia: la pesadilla de los indepes (2018)
