= Catalan Alliance =

Catalan Alliance Aliança Catalana
- Abbreviation: AC
- President: Sílvia Orriols
- Founder: Margarita Cabello
- Founded: 28 October 2020
- Split from: National Front of Catalonia
- Headquarters: Plaça de l'Ajuntament 11, Ripoll
- Membership (2025): >2,000
- Ideology: Catalan independence Liberal conservatism Anti-Spanish sentiment Anti-immigration; Islamophobia; Nativism
- Political position: Right-wing to far-right
- Colors: Dark blue
- Slogan: Salvem Catalunya ("Let's save Catalonia")
- Parliament of Catalonia: 2 / 135
- Mayors: 1 / 947
- Local government: 7 / 9,139
- County councilors: 2 / 1,028

Website
- aliancacatalana.cat

Catalan Alliance (Catalan: Aliança Catalana, AC) is a far-right, Catalan nationalist, pro-independence, nativist, and liberal-conservative political party in Catalonia. It also holds a heavy anti-Spanish and anti-immigration stance.

The party currently holds 2 seats in the Parliament of Catalonia and governs the municipality of Ripoll.

== History ==
The party was founded in 2020 in Ripoll, a small rural town of Catalonia. Sílvia Orriols, then councilor for the National Front of Catalonia (FNC), left the party due to discrepancies regarding its stance on immigration and on the 2017 Catalonia attacks, given that the terrorists were raised in Ripoll and radicalized by the imam of the town's mosque.

All FNC members in Ripoll joined Sílvia Orriols, and with other colaborators such as Jordi Aragonès they founded Catalan Alliance. The nationalist party was founded with the main objective of obtaining Catalan independence, emphasizing on improving public safety and reducing muslim immigration.

The party concurred the 2023 municipal elections in Ripoll, receiving the most votes in the town and obtaining six councilors. On 12 June, the other political forces in the municipality of Ripoll tried to make a pact to prevent Catalan Alliance from governing the municipality, but Together for Catalonia (Junts) ultimately did not participate in the agreement and Sílvia Orriols was sworn in as mayor on 17 June 2023.

In the other two municipalities where the party ran, they obtained two more councilors, one in Manlleu and another in Ribera d'Ondara. In the latter municipality, the party's representative, Albert Puig, assumed the mayor position in 2024 after mayor Elisabet Jové (ERC) stepped down shortly due to maternity leave, handing the mayoralty to Puig from March to July 2024 after having previously supported Jové on a motion of no confidence against the previous mayor. Puig governed with the support of councilors elected under the ERC banner. However, during that period Puig was kicked out of the party for an homophobic comment on X, calling the LGBT movement "the biggest cancer of Catalonia".

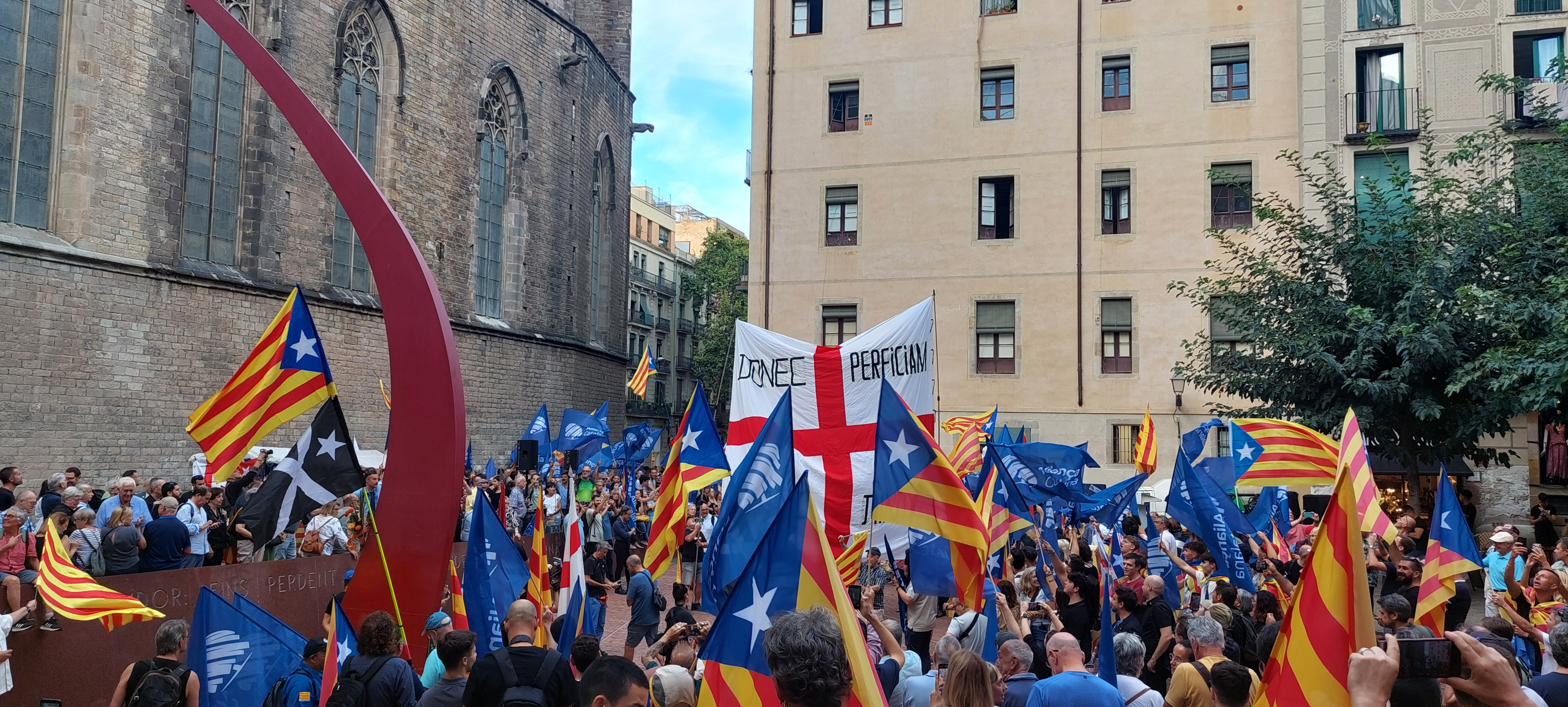
Catalan Alliance rally at Fossar de les Moreres, September 10, 2025

On 25 March 2024, Sílvia Orriols confirmed that she would be running as leading candidate for Catalan Alliance in the 2024 Catalan regional election. Ahead of the elections, most parties (including PSC, ERC, Junts, Comuns Sumar, and CUP) announced that they would form a cordon sanitaire and not enter into any coalition agreement with Catalan Alliance or Vox. After the election, the party entered the Catalan Parliament by obtaining 2 seats.

During 2025 and 2026, being members of the Parliament of Catalonia has given the party more exposure and increased significantly its popularity. Several polls are predicting the party is to gain between 20 and 28 seats in the next Catalan election, some predicting the party could even become the second-largest group in the Parliament, surpassing traditionally stablished parties such as Junts or the Republican Left.

== Ideology ==
Catalan Alliance is generally considered to be far-right on the political spectrum due to its views on immigration. However, it differs to the other main far-right party in Spain, Vox, on issues such as nationalism, social conservatism, and civil rights.

=== Catalan nationalism ===
Catalan Alliance heavily defends Catalan nationalism and Catalan independence. The party believes independence must be acquired unilaterally and criticizes other main pro-independence parties like Together for Catalonia (Junts) or the Republican Left of Catalonia (ERC), considering they failed when they had the opportunity to declare independence after the 2017 referendum. Sílvia Orriols, the party's president, has also criticized former Catalan president Carles Puigdemont for going into exile rather than standing for independence.

The party defends excluding Spanish institutions from Catalonia, as it considers them colonizers, and has proposed new institutions such as a Catalan military in case of becoming an independent State.

=== Immigration ===
Catalan Alliance defends a complete moratorioum on immigration until the average salary increases to the European average and immigrants assimilate the Catalan language. It stands for deporting all irregular migrants and those who commit any crime, as well as enforcing stricter requirements to immigrate legally to Catalonia such as having an employment contract. The party claims that multiculturalism is a failure and will result in a clash of civilizations.

The party claims that the current welfare system enables immigrants in Catalonia, particularly those arriving from poorer African countries, to receive more social benefits than Catalan citizens and to live without employment. Sílvia Orriols has argued that, because many immigrants do not work legally, they do not contribute to the tax system from which they benefit. Orriols has also accused left-wing governing parties of providing subsidies to immigrants in an effort to secure their electoral support, given that the immigrant population in Catalonia currently accounts for about 25% of the total population.

Catalan Alliance also claims that Islam is incompatible with western values, considering that islamic culture infringes upon individual rights and freedoms. The party has been described as anti-immigration and has called for the closure of mosques and bans on the burqa in public. The party leader, Sílvia Orriols, has openly declared that "islamophobia is our duty" and that the Spanish government promotes immigration to attack Catalan identity.

=== Culture ===
On cultural issues, Catalan Alliance is liberal-conservative in outlook, stating that defending western values and Catalan traditions is necessary to accomplish a free, tolerant and respectful society.

The party has criticized bilingualism in Catalonia, with prominent member Jordi Aragonès stating that newcomers usually learn Spanish instead of Catalan, and that knowing Catalan language should be a condition to live in Catalonia. They also believe that Catalan should be the only official language in Catalonia and that Spanish should be an optional subject at schools. The party argues that currently students should not automatically receive the Catalan language proficiency diploma after ending high school given poor test results.

=== Civil rights ===
Catalan Alliance bases its positions regarding civil rights on the principle of individual freedom. It defends abortion, euthanasia, feminism, same-sex marriage and gender identity, but has criticized the "woke agenda" and DEI policies. The party displayed the LGBTQ flag during LGBT pride in Ripoll, and has kicked one of its mayors for an homophobic comment on X. It has been accused of being homonationalism and femonationalism. (Note: For stating that the increment on violence against LGTBQ people or against women in Catalonia is due to unintegrated immigrants from countries which culture does not support or respect LGTBQ/women's rights.)

Catalan Alliance defends heavily the family, proposing incentives to increase the birth rate to preserve Catalan identity. The party has defended same-sex parenting and monoparental families. On other issues such as drug legalisation or AI the party has no official position.

The party stands for a security policy of zero-tolerance on crime, linking it to illegal immigration. The party supports increasing police presence.

=== Foreign ===
On international affairs, Catalan Alliance is soft Eurosceptic, saying that being part of the EU has positive and negative consequences. It believes that Catalonia should remain in the EU but aim to negotiate agreements and policies that benefit Catalan interests, rather than accepting and having to adapt to anything coming from Brussels. The party has proposed to held a referendum on EU membership after Catalan independence.

The party has showed steadfast support for Israel regarding the Gaza war, and has displayed Israeli symbols in the Parliament of Catalonia. Catalan Alliance has also showed intention to strengthen ties with the United States and has attended events at the American consulate in Barcelona.

=== Economics ===
On economic policy, Catalan Alliance holds a liberal-conservative to neoliberal stance. The party defends free-market economy and calls for a reduction of regulation and bureaucracy. It defends cuts on both public spending and taxation.

==== Taxation ====
The party defends a reduction of the income tax and its indexation to inflation, with extra reductions up to 30% to incentive issues such as natality or entrepreneurship. AC also defends the reduction of the self-employment monthly social security fee (cuota de autonómos), as well as the abolition of the wealth tax, the inheritance tax and the property transfer tax in the first purchase of a home. Moreover, Catalan Alliance promised to gradually return the inheritance tax increment that has been collected since the COVID-19 pandemic, when it was raised by about 60%, considering it a "cruel act to benefit from our dying seniors".

The party defines as one of its main priorities that Catalonia collects the totality of taxes, as currently about 40% of them are collected and managed by Spain. AC accuses Spain of "robbing" the Catalan people, shared argument with other pro-independence parties like Junts, ERC or CUP that defends that Catalonia contributes more to Spain's tax revenue than it receives in public investment.

AC calls for the creation of Special Economic Zones in areas outside of Barcelona, with tax exemptions and reductions, in order to incentive industry on historically productive rural areas that are now suffering population and productivity decline.

==== Public spending ====
Catalan Alliance considers that the Catalan government is too large and calls for reforms on efficiency. The party defends the reduction and merging of ministries, reduction of executive positions inside ministries, suppression of bodies that fulfill similar duties, enforcing audits to ensure government subsidies or bodies are fulfilling their objective and simplification and digitalization of administrative processes.

The party calls for an increment on the budget and powers of the Catalan Institute of Finance, in order to create a sovereign wealth fund comprised of Catalan enterprises and to give loans to Catalan companies to buy foreign companies and move their production to Catalonia.

AC defends an increment on the budget of the Mossos d'Esquadra, the Catalan police, to reinforce public safety. It also defends an increment on the judiciary budget to create new courtrooms and speed up processes, specially those regarding multiple-recidivism and squatting. The party also calls on a reform of the Penal Code to establish stricter punishments.

On public education, Catalan Alliance defends the reduction of bureaucracy enforced by the Education Ministry to teachers. The party calls for education methodology changes, given the continued poor performance results of Catalan students in global benchmarks. Regarding public universities, the party defends reducing students in degrees without significant employment demand.

== Electoral performance ==
Catalan Alliance has been expanding its territorial presence and preparing to contest in an increasing number of municipalities on the upcoming elections. Unlike Junts or ERC, the party refuses to participate in Spanish general elections, arguing that its political objective is Catalan independence and that it has no intention to participate in foreign elections.

=== Parliament of Catalonia ===
Parliament of Catalonia
Election	Leading candidate	Votes	%	Seats	Gov.
2024	Sílvia Orriols	119,149	3.8 (#8)	2 / 135	No
2028	Sílvia Orriols	?	?	0 / 135	?

=== Municipalities ===
Catalonia
Election	Leader	Votes	%	Seats	Breakdown
2023	Sílvia Orriols	1,806	0.06	8 / 9,139	Municipality / Seats / +/- / Votes / % / Gov. / Candidate; Manlleu / 1 / 21 / 1 / 357 / 5.8 / Opposition / Roger Saborit (Note: Resigned in May 2025 and subsequently left the party. His successor reportedly had a Spanish nationalist profile and had "sworn allegiance to the Spanish flag".); Ribera d'Ondara / 1 / 7 / 1 / 48 / 14.9 / Extraparliamentary / Albert Puig (Note: Puig was kicked out of the party in June 2024 for homophobic comments, resigning later that year. Its substitute defected to Units per Avançar.); Ripoll / 6 / 17 / 6 / 1,401 / 30.76 / Mayor / Sílvia Orriols
2027	Sílvia Orriols	?	?	0 / 9,139	?

== See also ==
- National Front of Catalonia (2013)
- Som Catalans
- Platform for Catalonia
