= Party for Freedom (Spain) =

Spanish political party

Party for Freedom Partido por la Libertad
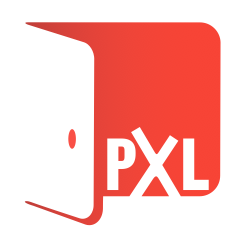
- Founded: 25 February 2013
- Headquarters: c/ Walia nº 4. escalera izquierda, 1º D, Madrid
- Ideology: Spanish nationalism Euroscepticism; Anti-Islam; Anti-immigration; Identitarianism
- Political position: Far-right
- National affiliation: RESPETO
- Local Government: 2 / 68,286

Website
- partidoxlalibertad.es

Partido por la Libertad (PxL; English: Party for Freedom) is a far-right political party active in Spain, with the exception of Catalonia, where its represented by its sister-party PxC.

== History ==
In 2012, Josep Anglada of PxC announced the launch of the Plataforma por la Libertad (PxL, English: Platform for Freedom), an expansion of the party into the rest of Spain. Anglada and the PxL have protested against the construction of mosques in Spain. Plataforma por la Libertad was refounded in 2013 as the Party for Freedom. PxL run in many municipalities in the local elections of 2015, gaining two town councillors (one in Alfoz de Lloredo and another in Valdeavero).
