= Next Catalan regional election =

Election in the Spanish region of Catalonia

- No later than 26 June 2028

All 135 seats in the Parliament of Catalonia 68 seats needed for a majority
- Opinion polls

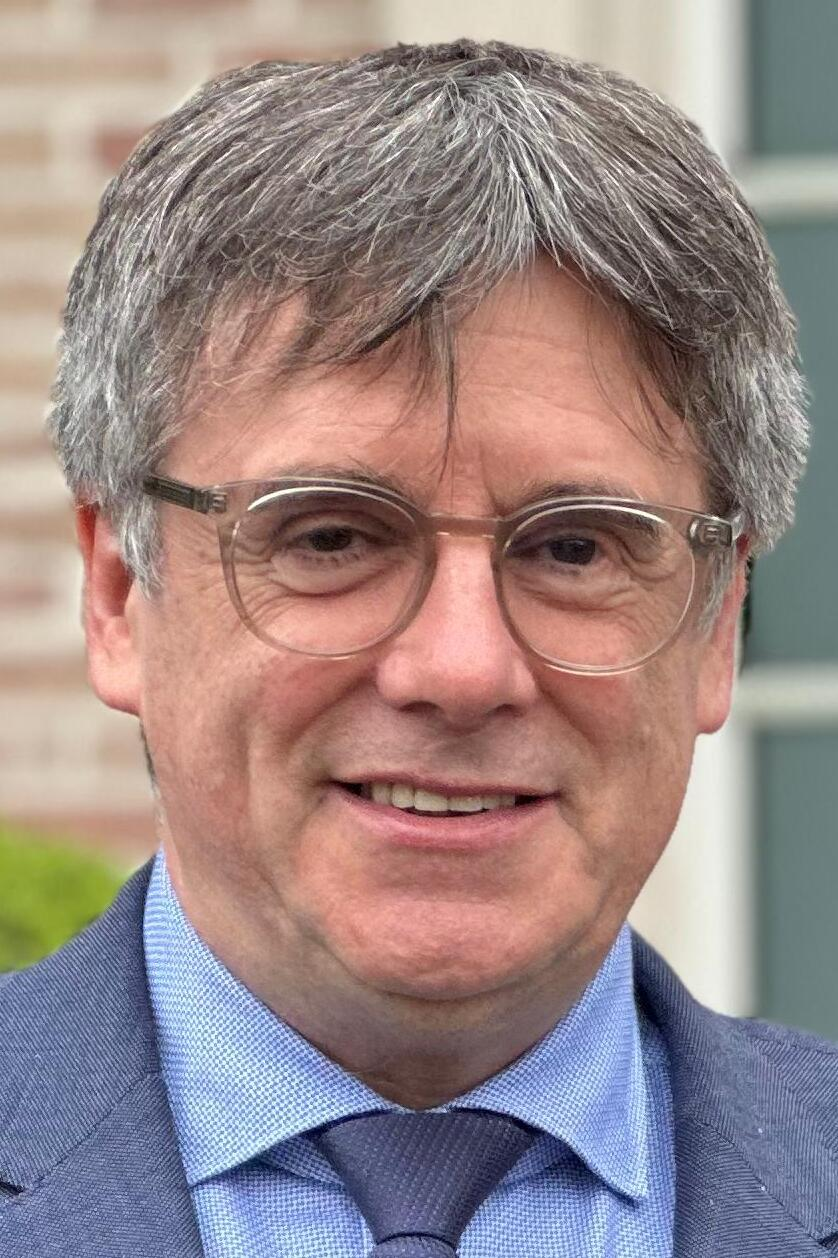

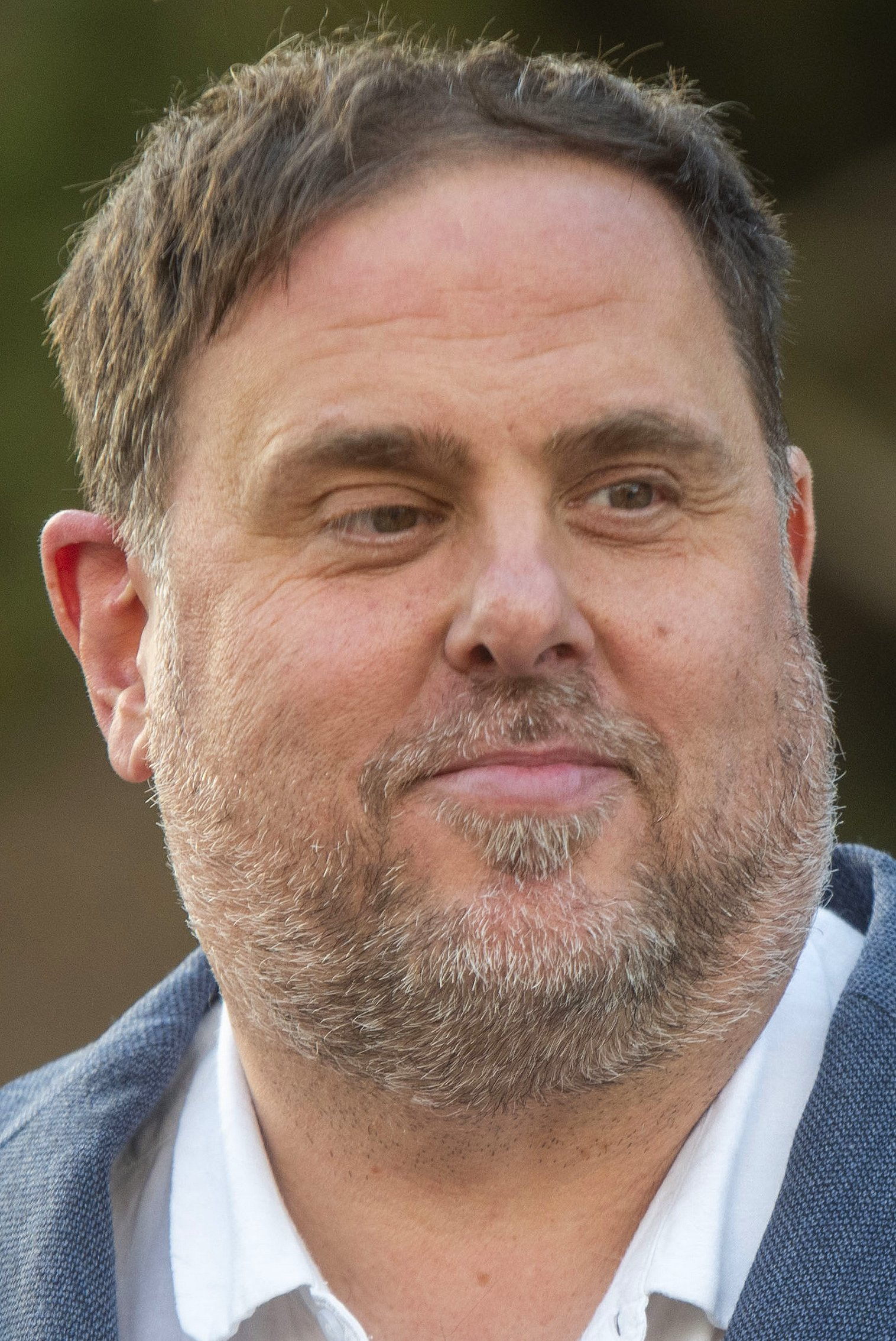

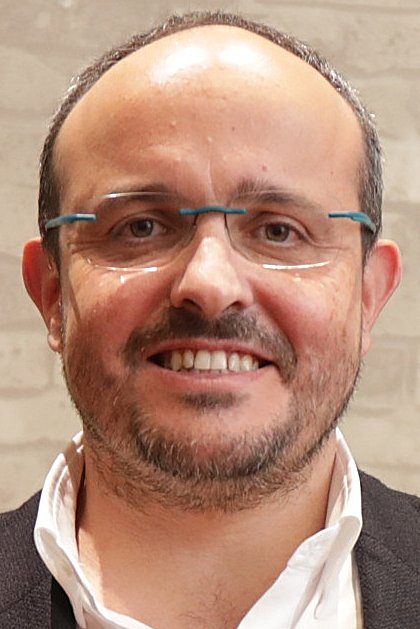

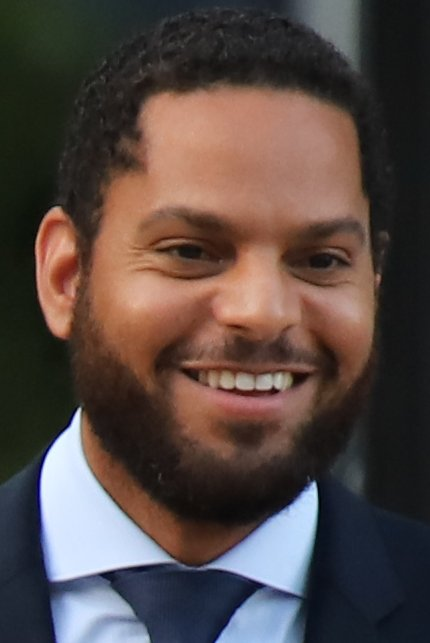

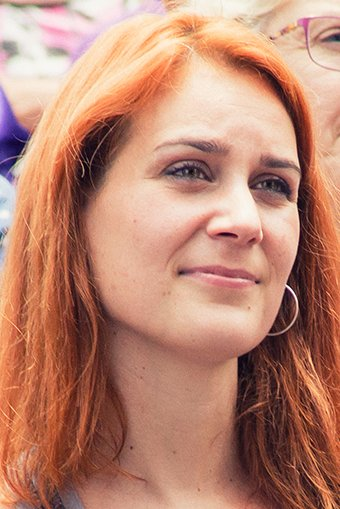

Leader	Salvador Illa	Carles Puigdemont	Oriol Junqueras
Party	PSC–PSOE	Cat–Junts+	ERC
Leader since	30 December 2020	21 March 2024	14 December 2024
Leader's seat	Barcelona	Barcelona	—
Last election	42 seats, 28.0%	35 seats, 21.6%	20 seats, 13.7%
Current seats	42	35	20
Seats needed	▲26	▲33	▲48
Leader	Alejandro Fernández	Ignacio Garriga	Jéssica Albiach
Party	PP	Vox	Comuns Sumar
Leader since	10 November 2018	10 August 2020	18 September 2018
Leader's seat	Barcelona	Barcelona	Barcelona
Last election	15 seats, 11.0%	11 seats, 8.0%	6 seats, 5.8%
Current seats	15	11	6
Seats needed	▲53	▲57	▲62
Leader	TBD	Sílvia Orriols
Party	CUP–DT	Aliança.cat
Leader since	—	28 October 2020
Leader's seat	—	Girona
Last election	4 seats, 4.1%	2 seats, 3.8%
Current seats	4	2
Seats needed	▲64	▲66
Incumbent President
Salvador Illa
PSC

A regional election will be held in Catalonia no later than 26 June 2028 to elect the 16th Parliament of the autonomous community. All 135 seats in the Parliament will be up for election.

The previous election saw the Socialists' Party of Catalonia (PSC) emerge as the largest party in a regional election—in both vote share and seat count—for the first time in history which, together with left-from-centre parties commanding a parliamentary majority (most notably the PSC together with Republican Left of Catalonia (ERC) and Comuns Sumar), allowed Salvador Illa to become the new regional president at the helm of a single-party minority cabinet.

== Overview ==
Under the 2006 Statute of Autonomy, the Parliament of Catalonia is the unicameral legislature of the homonymous autonomous community, having legislative power in devolved matters, as well as the ability to grant or withdraw confidence from a regional president. The electoral and procedural rules are supplemented by national law provisions.

=== Date ===
The term of the Parliament of Catalonia expires four years after the date of its previous election, unless it is dissolved earlier. The election shall be called no later than 15 days before the scheduled expiration date of parliament, with election day taking place between 40 and 60 days from the call. The previous election was held on 12 May 2024, which means that the chamber's term will expire on 12 May 2028. The election shall be called no later than 27 April 2028, setting the latest possible date for election day on 26 June 2028.

The regional president has the prerogative to dissolve the Parliament of Catalonia at any given time and call a snap election, provided that no motion of no confidence is in process and that dissolution does not occur before one year after a previous one under this procedure. In the event of an investiture process failing to elect a regional president within a two-month period from the first ballot, the Parliament is to be automatically dissolved and a fresh election called.

Difficulties in budget negotiations between the PSC and ERC throughout 2026 saw the media suggest that President Illa was considering calling a snap election to break the political deadlock, with 20 March—date on which the amendments to the entirety of the Catalan budget would be voted on—speculated as the deadline for Illa to take a decision on the issue. Castilian-Manchegan president Emiliano García-Page hinted at the possibility of a joint call of the Catalan, Andalusian and national elections in June 2026, though this was ultimately ruled out by both the Catalan and Spanish governments.

=== Electoral system ===
Voting for the Parliament is based on universal suffrage, comprising all Spanish nationals over 18 years of age, registered in Catalonia and with full political rights, provided that they have not been deprived of the right to vote by a final sentence.

The Parliament of Catalonia has a minimum of 100 and a maximum of 150 seats, with electoral provisions fixing its size at 135. All are elected in four multi-member constituencies—corresponding to the provinces of Barcelona, Girona, Lleida and Tarragona, each of which is assigned a fixed number of seats—using the D'Hondt method and closed-list proportional voting, with a three percent-threshold of valid votes (including blank ballots) in each constituency. The use of this electoral method may result in a higher effective threshold depending on district magnitude and vote distribution.

As a result of the aforementioned allocation, each Parliament constituency is entitled the following seats:

Seats	Constituencies
85	Barcelona
18	Tarragona
17	Girona
15	Lleida

The law does not provide for by-elections to fill vacant seats; instead, any vacancies arising after the proclamation of candidates and during the legislative term will be filled by the next candidates on the party lists or, when required, by designated substitutes.

=== Current parliament ===
The table below shows the composition of the parliamentary groups in the chamber at the present time.

Current parliamentary composition
Groups	Parties	Legislators	
Groups	Parties	Seats	Total
Socialists' and United to Advance; Parliamentary Group	PSC	40	42
Socialists' and United to Advance; Parliamentary Group	Els Units	2	42
Together's Parliamentary Group	JxCat	34	35
Together's Parliamentary Group	DC	1	35
Republican Left of Catalonia's Parliamentary Group	ERC	20	20
People's Party of Catalonia's Parliamentary Group	PP	15	15
Vox's Parliamentary Group in Catalonia	Vox	11	11
Commons Parliamentary Group	CatComú	5	6
Commons Parliamentary Group	MS	1	6
Mixed Group	CUP	4	6
Mixed Group	Aliança.cat	2	6

== Parties and candidates ==
The electoral law allows for parties and federations registered in the interior ministry, alliances and groupings of electors to present lists of candidates. Parties and federations intending to form an alliance are required to inform the relevant electoral commission within 10 days of the election call, whereas groupings of electors need to secure the signature of at least one percent of the electorate in the constituencies for which they seek election, disallowing electors from signing for more than one list. Concurrently, parties, federations or alliances that have not obtained a parliamentary mandate at the preceding election are required to secure the signature of at least 0.1 percent of electors in the aforementioned constituencies. Amendments in 2024 required a balanced composition of men and women in the electoral lists through the use of a zipper system.

Below is a list of the main parties and alliances which will likely contest the election:

Candidacy	Parties and alliances	Leading candidate	Ideology	Previous result		Gov.	Ref.
Candidacy	Parties and alliances	Leading candidate	Ideology	Vote %	Seats	Gov.	Ref.
PSC–PSOE	List: Socialists' Party of Catalonia (PSC–PSOE); United to Advance (Els Units)	Salvador Illa	Social democracy	28.0%	42	Yes	
Cat–Junts+	List: Together for Catalonia (JxCat) – Left Movement of Catalonia (MESCat) – Independence Rally (RI.cat) – Catalan State (EC) – Republican Youth of Lleida (JRL); Democrats of Catalonia (DC)	Carles Puigdemont	Catalan independence Populism	21.6%	35	No	
ERC	List: Republican Left of Catalonia (ERC)	Oriol Junqueras	Catalan independence Left-wing nationalism Social democracy	13.7%	20	No	
PP	List: People's Party (PP)	Alejandro Fernández	Conservatism; Christian democracy	11.0%	15	No	
Vox	List: Vox (Vox)	Ignacio Garriga	Right-wing populism Ultranationalism; National conservatism	8.0%	11	No	
Comuns; Sumar	List: Catalonia in Common (CatComú) – Barcelona in Common (BComú) – United Left Catalonia (EUCat) – Greens Equo (Verds Equo) – Green Left (EV); Unite Movement (MS)	Jéssica Albiach	Left-wing populism Direct democracy Eco-socialism	5.8%	6	No	
CUP–DT	List: Popular Unity Candidacy (CUP) – Forward–Socialist Organization of National Liberation (Endavant–OSAN) – Free People (PL–PPCC); Let's Reverse (Capgirem)	TBD	Catalan independence Anti-capitalism; Socialism	4.1%	4	No	
Aliança.cat	List: Catalan Alliance (Aliança.cat)	Sílvia Orriols	Catalan independence Anti-immigration; Hispanophobia	3.8%	2	No	

== Opinion polls ==
The tables below list opinion polling results in reverse chronological order, showing the most recent first and using the dates when the survey fieldwork was done, as opposed to the date of publication. Where the fieldwork dates are unknown, the date of publication is given instead. The highest percentage figure in each polling survey is displayed with its background shaded in the leading party's colour. If a tie ensues, this is applied to the figures with the highest percentages. The "Lead" column on the right shows the percentage-point difference between the parties with the highest percentages in a poll.

=== Graphical summary ===
Local regression trend line of poll results from 12 May 2024 to the present day, with each line corresponding to a political party.

=== Voting intention estimates ===
The table below lists weighted voting intention estimates. Refusals are generally excluded from the party vote percentages, while question wording and the treatment of "don't know" responses and those not intending to vote may vary between polling organisations. When available, seat projections determined by the polling organisations are displayed below (or in place of) the percentages in a smaller font; 68 seats are required for an absolute majority in the Parliament of Catalonia.

Polling firm/Commissioner	Fieldwork date	Sample size	Turnout	PSC	Junts	ERC	PP	Vox	Comuns Sumar	CUP	Aliança.cat	Podem	SALF	Lead
GESOP/CEO	1 Sep–5 Oct 2026	2,000	?	21.5; 33/35	14.0; 18/20	17.2; 24/26	9.7; 12/13	9.6; 12/13	5.1; 5/6	4.4; 4/5	15.0; 23/25	–	–	4.3
Ipsos/La Vanguardia	23 Sep–1 Oct 2026	2,000	57	21.7; 30	10.8; 16	15.0; 23	8.6; 11	13.1; 18	4.4; 4	3.2; 3	17.9; 30	2.1; 0	–	3.8
Sigma Dos/El Mundo	1–9 Sep 2026	2,231	?	23.3; 31/33	13.2; 19/22	14.1; 19/21	10.5; 13/15	10.2; 13/15	4.0; 4	4.0; 3/4	16.7; 25/28	–	–	6.6
GESOP/El Periódico	16–22 Jul 2026	800	?	25.0; 34/37	11.5; 15/18	16.0; 24/27	8.6; 12/13	9.2; 11/13	3.4; 3/4	3.2; 0/4	16.8; 25/28	–	–	8.2
GESOP/CEO	21 May–25 Jun 2026	2,000	?	24.3; 36/38	11.8; 16/18	18.1; 24/26	9.6; 12/13	9.8; 12/13	4.9; 4/5	4.4; 4/5	15.1; 23/25	–	–	6.2
Sigma Dos/El Mundo	26 May–5 Jun 2026	1,631	?	23.9; 33/35	14.2; 20/24	13.2; 19/21	10.2; 13/15	10.1; 13/15	5.5; 5/6	4.0; 3/5	13.8; 19/22	–	–	9.7
EM-Analytics/Electomanía	1–28 Apr 2026	1,500	?	25.7; 36	15.3; 22	17.6; 25	9.2; 13	10.0; 13	3.7; 4	3.2; 0	14.3; 22	–	–	8.1
YouGov/Ara (Note: Percentages are approximate.)	8–21 Apr 2026	1,353	?	27.0; 36/42	8.5; 11/14	18.5; 27/30	8.0; 9/11	11.5; 14/17	5.5; 4/7	4.0; 3/5	13.0; 20/22	–	–	8.5
EM-Analytics/Electomanía	1–28 Jan 2026	1,500	?	25.3; 35	16.4; 23	18.1; 26	9.9; 13	9.7; 13	3.7; 3	3.5; 3	12.4; 19	–	–	7.2
Opinòmetre/CEO	13 Oct–11 Nov 2025	2,000	?	25.7; 38/40	13.8; 19/20	15.6; 22/23	9.3; 12/13	9.8; 13/14	5.9; 6	4.7; 3/4	12.4; 19/20	–	–	10.1
Ipsos/La Vanguardia	11–17 Sep 2025	2,000	54	25.1; 36	13.3; 21	14.7; 21	9.6; 13	12.1; 16	4.9; 5	4.2; 4	11.9; 19	1.1; 0	–	10.4
Sigma Dos/El Mundo	1–11 Sep 2025	1,483	?	26.1; 37/39	16.2; 24/26	15.0; 20/21	10.5; 14/15	9.5; 12/13	5.2; 5/6	4.6; 4/5	9.8; 11/14	–	–	9.9
Vox	2 Sep 2025	1,000	?	23.9; 36	18.4; 29	15.8; 23	10.1; 15	10.6; 16	6.2; 7	3.2; 3	6.0; 6	–	–	5.5
Opinòmetre/CEO	30 May–28 Jun 2025	2,000	?	26.8; 40/42	17.5; 28/30	14.5; 21/23	10.3; 14/15	9.6; 12/14	5.8; 5/6	4.5; 3/4	7.6; 10/11	–	–	9.3
NC Report/La Razón	16–31 May 2025	500	54.2	? 44	? 31	? 18	? 16	? 12	? 5	? 3	? 6	–	–	?
The Objective	30 Apr 2025	1,000	?	29.4; 43/45	17.2; 27/29	13.2; 17/19	10.7; 15/17	9.8; 13/15	4.6; 4/5	2.7; 2/3	6.3; 8/9	–	1.1; 0	12.2
Opinòmetre/CEO	14 Feb–14 Mar 2025	2,000	?	27.2; 41/43	17.0; 27/29	14.4; 21/23	10.9; 14/16	8.4; 10/12	7.0; 6/7	4.1; 3/4	6.2; 8/10	–	–	10.2
GESOP/CEO	11 Oct–24 Nov 2024	2,000	?	27.4; 39/42	18.7; 30/32	13.8; 20/21	10.6; 15/16	7.5; 10/11	6.6; 6/7	5.7; 5/6	5.0; 6/7	–	–	8.7
NC Report/La Razón	5–12 Jul 2024	1,000	56.5	29.5; 44/45	22.4; 35/36	11.1; 15/16	11.9; 15/16	6.8; 9	4.1; 3	3.7; 3	4.0; 5	2.2; 2	2.1; 2	7.1
GESOP/CEO	10 Jun–8 Jul 2024	2,000	?	28.0– 32.0; 39/45	19.0– 23.0; 31/36	13.0– 16.0; 19/24	10.0– 13.0; 13/18	6.0– 8.0; 7/11	5.0– 7.0; 5/8	3.0– 5.0; 1/6	2.0– 4.0; 1/4	–	–	9.0
Hamalgama Métrica/Vozpópuli	1–4 Jul 2024	1,000	?	29.4; 44	22.8; 36	11.6; 17	11.7; 16	8.3; 11	5.0; 5	3.6; 3	3.9; 3	–	–	6.6
Demoscopia y Servicios/The Objective	22–24 Jun 2024	1,000	?	28.8; 43	22.7; 36	11.9; 17	11.7; 16	6.6; 10	5.1; 5	3.5; 3	4.0; 5	–	–	6.1
EM-Analytics/GMG	9–13 Jun 2024	1,150	?	30.9; 43	23.4; 36	11.2; 16	12.2; 15	8.0; 11	5.1; 5	3.5; 3	4.5; 6	–	–	7.5
NC Report/La Razón	8–10 Jun 2024	1,000	54.4	29.3; 44/45	21.8; 34/35	11.5; 17/18	11.5; 15/16	7.6; 10/11	5.4; 5	3.8; 4	4.1; 2/3	–	2.4; 0/2	7.5
2024 EP election	9 Jun 2024	—N/a	43.5	30.6 (46)	18.0 (30)	14.8 (23)	13.8 (20)	6.2 (8)	4.3 (4)	–	–	4.6 (4)	2.8 (0)	12.6
2024 regional election	12 May 2024	—N/a	55.3	28.0; 42	21.6; 35	13.7; 20	11.0; 15	8.0; 11	5.8; 6	4.1; 4	3.8; 2	–	–	6.4

=== Voting preferences ===
The table below lists raw, unweighted voting preferences.

Polling firm/Commissioner	Fieldwork date	Sample size	PSC	Junts	ERC	PP	Vox	Comuns Sumar	CUP	Aliança.cat	Podem	Question	X mark	Lead
GESOP/CEO	1 Sep–5 Oct 2026	2,000	18.6	8.8	18.1	5.3	6.3	3.9	3.8	10.0	0.1	11.8	6.8	0.5
GESOP/El Periódico	16–22 Jul 2026	800	21.0	5.2	17.0	4.4	6.3	3.2	2.4	13.1	1.8	13.8	5.3	4.0
GESOP/CEO	21 May–25 Jun 2026	2,000	19.1	6.5	17.9	4.1	6.0	4.0	4.0	9.7	0.1	13.2	7.7	1.2
GESOP/ICPS	13 Oct–22 Nov 2025	2,000	19.1	8.6	17.4	2.8	4.2	2.5	3.4	8.8	1.4	17.4	9.4	1.7
Opinòmetre/CEO	13 Oct–11 Nov 2025	2,000	21.4	7.5	15.2	4.3	6.8	4.7	4.4	8.4	0.1	12.2	9.3	6.2
Ipsos/La Vanguardia	11–17 Sep 2025	2,000	19.1	7.2	15.4	5.3	9.9	2.8	3.1	9.3	0.9	16.0	3.2	3.7
Opinòmetre/CEO	30 May–28 Jun 2025	2,000	21.0	9.7	14.2	4.7	6.3	5.0	5.5	4.7	0.1	13.4	9.0	6.8
CIS	7–31 Mar 2025	2,307	26.5	6.8	10.8	6.7	4.2	3.0	2.7	4.6	1.5	23.9	5.0	15.7
Opinòmetre/CEO	14 Feb–14 Mar 2025	2,000	22.8	10.1	13.9	5.3	5.7	3.5	3.9	2.9	3.1	9.8	10.4	8.9
GESOP/ICPS	7 Nov–3 Dec 2024	1,200	18.4	11.3	14.1	3.3	3.0	3.1	5.3	2.7	2.2	16.7	14.2	4.3
GESOP/CEO	11 Oct–24 Nov 2024	2,000	21.1	12.1	12.5	4.8	4.0	5.7	4.5	2.4	0.1	15.0	9.0	8.6
GESOP/CEO	10 Jun–8 Jul 2024	2,000	23.7	12.4	14.1	5.8	4.7	4.8	4.1	2.9	0.5	12.5	8.2	9.6
2024 EP election (Note: Does not include non-resident citizens.)	9 Jun 2024	—N/a	13.3	7.8	6.4	6.0	2.7	1.9	–	–	2.0	—N/a	56.5	5.5
2024 regional election	12 May 2024	—N/a	16.1	12.4	7.9	6.3	4.6	3.3	2.4	2.2	–	—N/a	42.1	3.7

=== Preferred President ===
The table below lists opinion polling on leader preferences to become president of the Government of Catalonia.

All candidates

Polling firm/Commissioner	Fieldwork date	Sample size													Other/ None/ Not care	Question	Lead
Polling firm/Commissioner	Fieldwork date	Sample size	Illa PSC	Puigdem. Junts	Nogueras Junts	Junqueras ERC	Rufián ERC	Fernández PP	Garriga Vox	Albiach CatComú	Estrada CUP	Cornellà CUP	Castillejo CUP	Orriols AC	Other/ None/ Not care	Question	Lead
GESOP/CEO	1 Sep–5 Oct 2026	2,000	20.0	10.9	–	16.1	1.4	1.2	1.1	1.4	–	–	0.7	13.3	19.6	13.0	3.9
GESOP/CEO	21 May–25 Jun 2026	2,000	17.6	4.8	–	5.3	6.5	0.3	0.3	0.8	0.1	–	0.0	7.9	32.3	24.2	9.7
Sigma Dos/El Mundo	26 May–5 Jun 2026	1,631	21.0	12.0	–	11.0	–	–	–	–	–	–	–	15.0	–	–	6.0
YouGov/Ara	8–21 Apr 2026	1,353	14.0	7.0	1.0	5.0	19.0	6.0	8.0	3.0	–	–	1.0	15.0	18.0	3.0	4.0
GESOP/ICPS	13 Oct–22 Nov 2025	2,000	20.9	10.2	–	10.1	2.9	1.0	1.3	2.1	–	0.7	–	8.8	6.5	35.7	10.7
Opinòmetre/CEO	13 Oct–11 Nov 2025	2,000	20.6	8.0	–	7.3	3.8	0.8	1.1	1.1	0.5	–	–	7.9	29.9	19.0	12.6
Opinòmetre/CEO	30 May–28 Jun 2025	2,000	20.3	8.8	–	6.0	2.4	0.9	1.1	1.1	1.2	–	–	4.0	30.7	23.6	11.5
CIS (Note: Responses denoting a party's generic candidate are aggregated to that party's main candidate/leader at the time of the poll.)	7–31 Mar 2025	2,307	27.6	4.7	–	4.5	0.8	3.3	2.8	1.1	0.5	–	–	3.9	7.2	43.6	22.9
Opinòmetre/CEO	14 Feb–14 Mar 2025	2,000	21.9	9.3	–	6.3	1.3	0.8	0.9	0.9	0.8	–	–	1.4	33.3	22.9	12.6
GESOP/ICPS	7 Nov–3 Dec 2024	1,200	20.6	14.5	–	10.7	0.5	1.0	1.3	2.9	1.3	–	–	2.6	12.2	32.6	6.1
GESOP/CEO	11 Oct–24 Nov 2024	2,000	18.1	10.8	–	3.2	1.1	0.3	0.6	0.6	0.2	–	–	1.4	39.9	24.0	7.3

Illa vs. Puigdemont

Polling firm/Commissioner	Fieldwork date	Sample size			Other/ None/ Not care	Question	Lead
Polling firm/Commissioner	Fieldwork date	Sample size	Illa PSC	Puigdem. Junts	Other/ None/ Not care	Question	Lead
InvyMark/laSexta	13–17 May 2024	?	68.9	30.0	–	1.1	38.9

=== Predicted President ===
The table below lists opinion polling on the perceived likelihood for each leader to become president.

Polling firm/Commissioner	Fieldwork date	Sample size			Other/ None/ Not care	Question	Lead
Polling firm/Commissioner	Fieldwork date	Sample size	Illa PSC	Puigdem. Junts	Other/ None/ Not care	Question	Lead
GESOP/CEO	10 Jun–8 Jul 2024	2,000	65.4	14.3	7.7	12.7	51.1

== Bibliography ==
- Ley Orgánica 4/1979, de 18 de diciembre, de Estatuto de Autonomía de Cataluña (Organic Law 4/1979). Official State Gazette (in Spanish). 18 December 1979. BOE-A-1979-30178.
- Ley Orgánica 5/1985, de 19 de junio, del Régimen Electoral General (Organic Law 5/1985). Official State Gazette (in Spanish). 19 June 1985 [version as of 2 July 2026]. BOE-A-1985-11672.
- Ley Orgánica 6/2006, de 19 de julio, de reforma del Estatuto de Autonomía de Cataluña (Organic Law 6/2006). Official State Gazette (in Spanish). 19 July 2006 [version as of 28 December 2022]. BOE-A-2006-13087.
- Ley 13/2008, de 5 de noviembre, de la presidencia de la Generalidad y del Gobierno (Law 13/2008). Official State Gazette (in Spanish). 5 November 2008 [version as of 25 April 2019]. BOE-A-2008-19526.
