= Tabarnia =

Fictional region of Catalonia

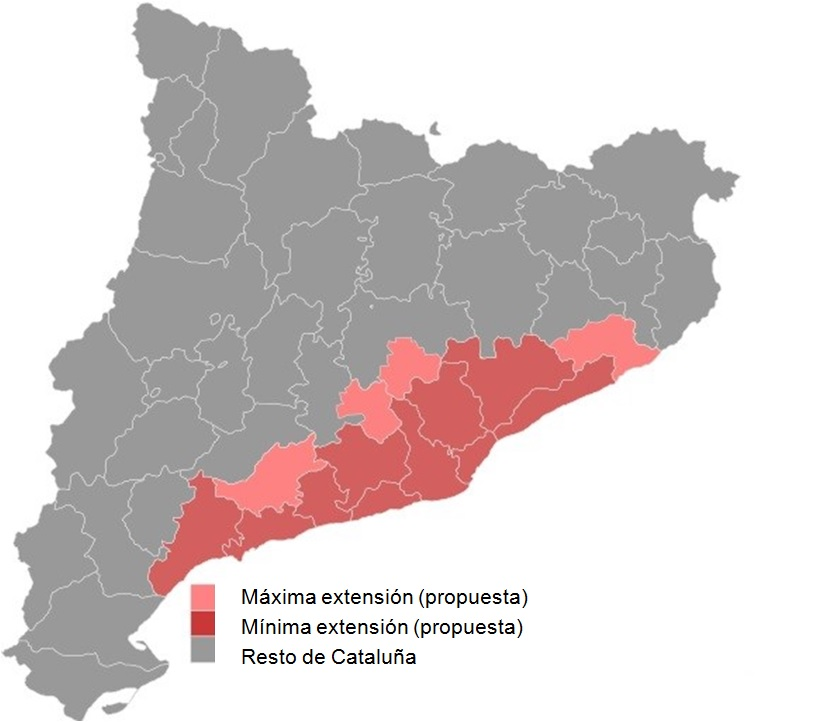
Proposed extent of Tabarnia.

Proposed flag of Tabarnia.

Proposed Seal of Tabarnia.

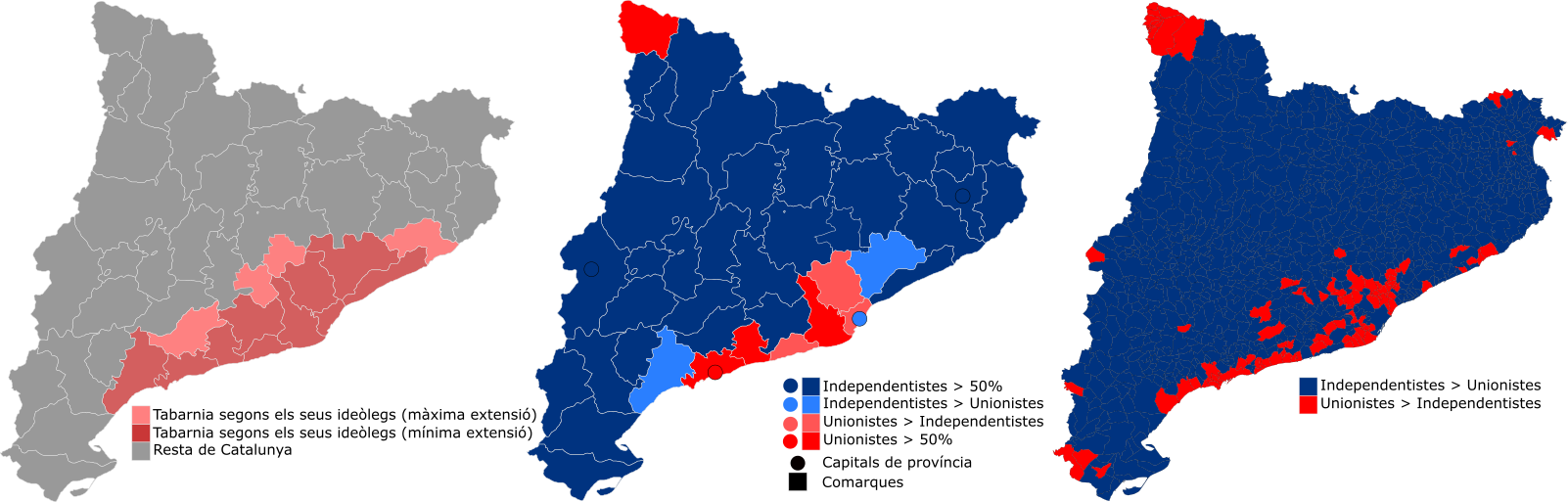
Theoretical extent of Tabarnia (left), compared to the results of the 2017 Catalan regional election. Red-colored regions supported unionist parties; blue-colored regions supported separatist parties.

Tabarnia (Tabàrnia in Catalan) (Catalan pronunciation: [təˈβaɾ.ni.ə]; Spanish: [taˈβaɾnja]) is a fictional region within Catalonia, a satirical parody of the Catalan independence movement and a movement against the independence of Catalonia from Spain. The Tabarnia movement mirrors the independentist movement advocating for a referendum to create a new Spanish autonomous community out of coastal urban parts of Catalonia, a region that gathers most of the population of Catalonia and in which, in general, votes for independentist parties rarely reach 30% of the votes but generates most of the gross domestic product of Catalonia. It would encompass the current Catalan comarques of Maresme, Baix Camp, Baix Penedès, Alt Penedès, Garraf, Baix Llobregat, Barcelonès, Vallès Oriental, Vallès Occidental and Tarragonés.

The Tabarnia movement assumes that the sovereign subject is not the total of Catalans, but the total of Spaniards (as stated in the Spanish Constitution), so it proposes satirically a gerrymandering strategy to mirror another case of alleged gerrymandering by Catalan independentists, that propose breaking the sovereignty of Spain to decide if Catalonia should become a separate state, allowing people to vote only where secessionism could have chances to win.

Proponents believe the area somewhat corresponds to the historic County of Barcelona, although its extent is considerably different. This proposal, from a platform created in 2011, provoked renewed interest after the electoral results of the 2017 Catalan regional election. The word 'Tabarnia' went viral on 26 December 2017, reaching worldwide top-trending status with over 648,000 mentions. The only major demonstration organized by the Tabarnia movement took place in Barcelona on 4 March 2018, with 15,000 participants according to the Guarda Urbana and 200,000 according to organizers.

The term, the concept and the Tabarnia flag were invented by a neighbor of Barcelona named Daniel de la Fuente in 2012. Jaume Vives and Albert Boadella (considered one of the founders of Ciudadanos) have self-proclaimed to be the spokesman and president of Tabarnia. Jaume Vives stated: "It is starting to achieve its objective, that the (Catalan) independentists start debunking their own arguments.". Miquel Martinez presents itself as the representative of Platform for Tabarnia, but in the association registry of Catalonia only exists the "Associació Somos Tabarnia" (Association We are Tabarnia). At a Spain level two other platforms exist: "Coordinadora por Tabarnia" and "Asamblea Nacional de Tabarnia".

Several anti-secession parties and organisations have publicized and participated in events in support of the idea of Tabarnia. Those include Ciudadanos, Partido Popular, Vox and Plataforma per Catalunya. On the Internet, the blog Dolça Catalunya contributed to boost its popularity. Other parties and movements, mostly pro-secession, have criticized the concept of Tabarnia, like Esquerra Republicana de Catalunya, PDeCAT and the far-right and xenophobic Moviment Identitari Català and Front Nacional de Catalunya.

== Movement ==
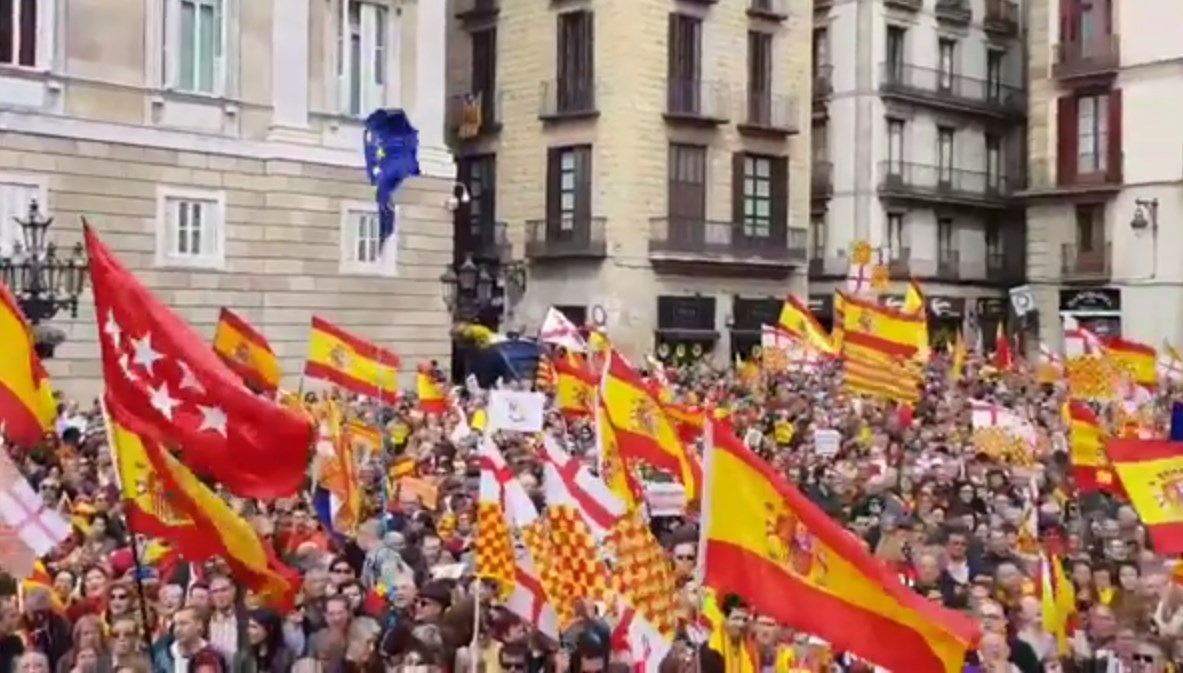
Tabarnia's movement protest on 4 March 2018 against Catalan independence from Spain

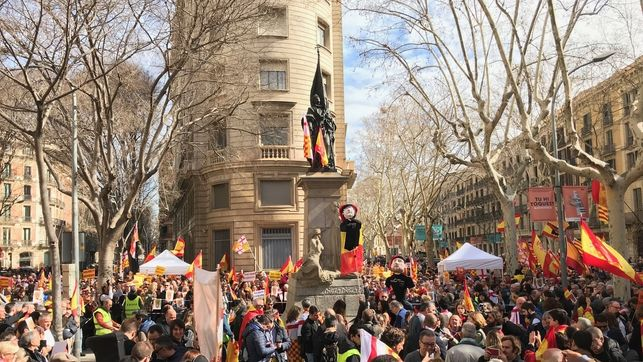
Floral offering to Rafael Casanova during the protest

Proponents of Tabarnia wish to distance themselves from the Catalan separatist movement and reclaim the right of a number of territories near the area of Barcelona and Tarragona to constitute themselves as an autonomous community within Spain. In the 2015 and 2017 Catalan regional elections, parties opposed to secession (mainly Citizens, PSC and PP) received a majority of votes and seats in Tabarnia as a whole (as opposed to much fewer votes across the entirety of Catalonia) and in a small number of coastal comarques (Tarragonès, Baix Penedès and Baix Llobregat) including the city of Tarragona. They received a plurality of votes in the comarca of Barcelonès, yet not in the city of Barcelona itself. They allude to a series of fiscal arguments similar to those of Catalan separatism in regards to Spain. The term "Tabarnia" is a neologism based on the names of Tarragona and Barcelona, the two Catalan provinces where support for separatism is lower, although in last Catalan election, Tarragona province showed more support for separatism than unionism.

The movement uses as a legal basis the Canadian Clarity Act, according to which regions opposed to Québécois separatism are to remain within Canada in case of a secession, as well as Articles 143 and 144 of the Spanish constitution, which allows the formation of autonomous communities.

An ongoing online petition is taking place at Change.org in order to be sent to the Spanish Congress of Deputies to consider the creation of this new autonomous region. It has received 281,000 signatures to date.

On 4 March 2018 a protest mocking the Catalan independence bid was organized by the Tabarnia movement. 15,000 demonstrators according to the urban guard and 200,000 according to the organizers gathered with Spanish, Tabarnian and Catalan flags and waived slogans for Tabarnia mimicking those of the Catalan independence movement. The protest started with a floral offering at the statue of Rafael Casanova, Considered by the independentists a patriot of their cause, but that according to one of his descendants present at the protest was actually a Spanish patriot. According to one of the organizers, the goal of the protest was to show the absurdity of the arguments for independence. He told the media that "we want to be the mirror of what the independence movement is all about". The protest was also criticized by some separatists which claim that Tabarnia trivializes their movement, which according to them is based on a distinct cultural identity and a long history of tension with Madrid. The protest ended at Saint James's Square, directly across from the Palau de la Generalitat de Catalunya.

The protest on 4 March received support from some civic and political associations, including the pro Spanish union platform Societat Civil Catalana, and far-right political parties like PxC and Vox.

An online petition was begun on Change.org to have the name of the Plaça Països Catalans (Catalan Countries Square) changed to "Plaza Tabarnia".

== Political claims ==
Tabarnians claim vote representation in Catalonia to be unfair across the four different provinces Lleida, Girona, Tarragona and Barcelona, resulting in unfair economic investment. Under the current electoral law, in the province of Barcelona 48,521 votes are needed to elect one representative in the Catalan Parliament for the 20,915 votes needed in Lleida, resulting in a 2.3 ratio. Tarragona requires 31,317 votes and Girona 30,048. Catalan separatists argue the current electoral law ensures political representation for areas with a lower population density while Tabarnians argue the law has not been revised because historically Lleida and Girona have always had a majority of voters in favor of the separatist political parties that have kept them in government.

The same way Catalan separatist have used an interpretation of economic data to argue they have an unfavourable finance balance towards the rest of Spain, Tabarnians argue Tarragona and Barcelona underrepresentation in the Catalan Parliament has resulted in unfavourable finance balance towards their region, also backed by similar interpretation of economic data.

== Demonym ==
On 27 December 2017, following public enquiry by Spanish citizens, the Real Academia Española (Royal Academy of Spanish Language) informed through their Twitter account that the most appropriate demonym for Tabarnia would be "Tabarnés" among other possible options such as "tabarniense", "tabarniano", or "tabinososano".

== Hypothetical territory and historical revisionism ==
Catalan regional plan 1995, used as the basis for different veguerias projects.: Àmbit metropolità; Alt Pirineu i Aran; Tarragona; Comarques Centrals; Comarques Gironines; Ponent; Terres de l'Ebre

Tabarnia is a fictional territorial proposal that does not correspond to any present political or administrative unit. The Tabarnian movement mirrors the alleged historical revisionism by Catalan separatists, and finds a precedent of territorial political and administrative unit at a certain point in history that justifies their existence: According to their own publication, the County of Barcelona, during the Middle Ages, had a similar territory to the one proposed by Tabarnians, today. Most sources consider Tabarnia to be just a fictional region.

== Controversy ==
The movements founders, Catalan politicians such as Inés Arrimadas and numerous commentators have argued that the rise of this movement creates tension among the Catalan separatist movement because it serves as a mirror of their argumental contradiction. By using their same arguments for independence, it forces Catalan separatists to contradict themselves by using "unionist" counter-arguments in order to discredit the Tabarnia movement.

By proposing the hypothetical separation of Tabarnia from Catalonia, the founders of the Tabarnia project want for the separatist politicians to realize that a large proportion of Catalans consider themselves Spanish and do no not want to leave Spain and that a declaration of independence could trigger similar movements within the territory, to the point of absurdity. According to Manuel Muñiz, the dean of the school of international relations at IE University in Madrid, it sparked a debate over "who is to vote and when" in a democracy and he questioned whether regions should be the ones entitled to decide on their independence or if cities would also qualify? Or should it be neighborhoods within cities?

According to Salvador Garcia Ruiz, the chief executive of Ara, Tabarnia is nothing more than a sour response to the results of the 2017 Catalan regional election in which the independentists did not lose their majority over the parliament. He labeled Tabarnia as Peter Pan's "Neverland" for the unionists. Podemos' leader Pablo Iglesias was also critical with the movement because he claimed it was fueling an unhelpful "war of flags" but the spokesman for Tabarnia claims that the goal was never to break up Catalonia, but rather ending Catalan secessionism and all its disruptive consequences.

== See also ==
- Constitutional status of Orkney, Shetland and the Western Isles
- Partition of Quebec
- Mayotte
- West Virginia in the American Civil War
- Other Autonomous Communities that have been created in Spain using the above-mentioned articles of the Spanish Constitution
  - Community of Madrid
  - Community of La Rioja
  - The Province of Albacete was originally part of the Community of Murcia (before it had an autonomous government) but was then reassigned to Castilla La Mancha when regions were given autonomous governments
  - Ceuta and Melilla were originally part of the Cadiz province and Málaga province respectively within the Autonomous Community of Andalusia, after which they were granted a new status as autonomous cities, separating both from their province and from Andalusia.
