= National Front of Catalonia (2013) =

National Front of Catalonia Front Nacional de Catalunya
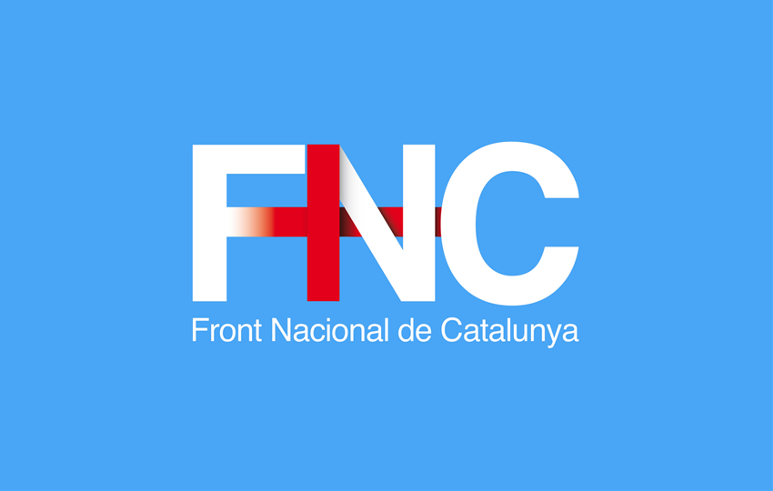
- Abbreviation: FNC
- Founded: 18 November 1999
- Ideology: Catalan independence Catalan nationalism Anti-immigration
- Political position: Far-right
- Colors: Sky blue
- Slogan: Allibera el teu país ("Free your country")
- Local government (2023–2027): 6 / 9,157

Website
- elfront.cat

The National Front of Catalonia (Catalan: Front Nacional de Catalunya, FNC) is a Catalan far-right and pro-independence political party, presented in 2013. It had a local councilor in Ripoll between 2019 and 2020. Their main ideological principles are Catalan nationalism and opposition to irregular immigration.

== History ==
=== Foundation ===
The party was registered in 1999 with the same name as the National Front of Catalonia, which had dissolved in 1990. In 2013, Jordi Casacubera i Pérez, Pere Soler i Montoliu, Miquel Àngel Rodríguez i Fernàndez, and Moisès Font i Casademont publicly launched the party. Jordi Casacuberta had been a member of the National Front of Catalonia, Catalan State, Republican Left of Catalonia, Catalan National Unity, and Reagrupament. Pere Soler and Miquel Àngel Rodríguez had been members of the Democratic Union of Catalonia, and Moisès Font had been councilor of Platform for Catalonia in Olot and territorial president of PxC in Girona.

Former members of the original FNC made a statement saying that when they had dissolved the FNC in 1990, they had approved in the last General Assembly that no-one would use the name in future, and that the ideology defended by the new FNC was different from the socialism that the original FNC stood for. On June 27, 2014, Jordi Casacuberta i Pere Soler re-introduced the party with the name of National Democratic Bloc in Girona. They were defined as social conservatives and republicans.

They wanted to present tenths of lists for the 2015 local elections, but never did so. The party announced they would not participate in Catalan regional elections before independence in order to avoid dividing the vote.

=== 2019 local elections ===
In the 2019 local elections, the party presented a list in Ripoll, with the same name as the National Front of Catalonia, dissolved in 1990. The first on the list was Sílvia Orriols Serra and the second candidate was Fina Guix, who had been a councillor for Convergència i Unió in the previous legislature. Alternative for Ripoll, the Republican Left of Catalonia, Together for Catalonia and the Socialists' Party of Catalonia pledged not to negotiate or work with the other two candidates from the FNC and Som Catalans, because they believed they were racist. The FNC denied this allegation. The party obtained 503 votes (9.44%) and Sílvia Orriols Serra was elected as a councillor.

During the 2020 coronavirus pandemic, Sílvia Orriols left the FNC because of differences with the party on how to «face the serious national situation and the problem of immigration». As she continued to be councillor, the FNC was left without representation. She would later form the Catalan Alliance party.

=== 2023 local elections ===
In the 2023 local elections, the party presented a total of 9 lists. Sergi Perramon, former member of the JNC and current general secretary of the Catalan Business Circle, and Maria Àngels Curtichs obtained the act of councilors in Manresa, and in the municipality of La Masó, with a candidacy led by former Junts councilor Albert Camps, obtained an absolute majority of four seats. In total, the FNC collected 3,529 votes throughout Catalonia.

== Electoral performance ==
=== Parliament of Catalonia ===
Parliament of Catalonia
| Election | Leading candidate | Votes | % | Seats | +/– | Government |
| 2021 | Albert Pont i Serrano | 5,003 | 0.18 (#12) | 0 / 135 | New | No seats |
| 2024 | N/A | 264 | 0.01 (#17) | 0 / 135 | 0 | No seats |

=== Municipalities ===
| Data | Catalonia | | |
| Data | Votes | % | Seats |
|---|---|---|---|
| 2019 | 503 | 0.01 | 1 / 9,069 |
| 2023 | 3,529 | 0.11 | 6 / 9,139 |
