= Dolça Catalunya =

Spanish far-right blog

- Website type: Far-right Spanish propaganda
- Available in: Catalan and Spanish
- Founded: October 2013
- Founders: Guillermo Elizalde Monroset, Javier Barraycoa Martínez, Jorge Buxadé Villalba, Jorge Soley Climent
- Commercial: Yes (via merchandising and ads)
- Launched: 11 October 2013

Dolça Catalunya (equivalent in English as 'Sweet Catalonia'), is an online blog of opinion and essay linked to the Spanish far-right. It is written in a deliberately macaronic amalgam of Catalan and Spanish and deals with the events, language and politics that involve the linguistical domain of the Catalan Countries. Founded in October 2013 mainly by Guillem Elizalde Monroset, its articles promote the territorial unity of Spain and the language secessionism of Catalan with fake news and the incitement of diverse social discriminations and racism, especially Catalan phobia.

Even though the website is announced under the slogan Seny de catalanes bajo el nacionalismo ('Maturity of the Catalans subdued by nationalism') and described as a blog written by anonymous citizens, it is directed and edited by members associated with extreme conservatism, the Spanish far-right, the fundamentalist Catholicism from the Opus Dei prelature and the academic and governing staff of the private Abat Oliba CEU University.

== Discourse and scope ==
Dolça Catalunya's writings, which alternate Catalan and Spanish languages (often within the same sentences) and that are never signed by their authors, aim to create a discourse against what they define as Catalan nationalism and separatism through the use of topical manipulation and a wide range of anti-Catalanist, antigypsyist, islamophobic and other racist and homophobic discriminations. They have also openly published essays against sexual freedom and abortion rights. In fact, it has been described as one of the most Catalanophobic far-right propaganda websites among the existing ones in Spain, given its harsh criticism of Catalan language normalization policies but omitting Catalans as a cultural group in their publications.

The anonymity of Dolça Catalunya is used to employ a tone that, while claiming itself as satiric and fresh, abuses of explicit insults, humiliation and mockery of civilians and political opponents -which is considered a common communication strategy from the contemporary European far right. By using a speech that advocates for the historical revisionism applied to the Hispanic Catalanism (a trend that moves away from the past Spanish colonialism to consider the only senseful existence of Catalonia as an indivisible part of Spain), Dolça Catalunya has contributed to promotes campaigns of gerrymandering and post-truths politics such as the fictional region of Tabarnia. Besides, it has also participated in public calls for neo-fascist protests in Barcelona.

One of the most used examples by the website is the figure of the theologist Francesc Canals Vidal, a key ideologist of the Hispanic Catalanism who during the 70s participated in a Catholic movement to promote the vote against the Spanish Constitution after the end of Francoism. Regarding linguistics, the website actively supports language secessionism of Catalan, Valencian and the Balearic Catalan, which has also led to attacks and mockery towards projects like the Catalan Wikipedia and its editing community, describing them as "fanatics", "propaganda" or "uncountably subsidized".

Dolça Catalunya is considered to be a clickbait portal with a blog structure that does not meet the ethical criteria of journalism. Its content is framed within the populism, the sensationalism and the dissemination of fake news with a misrepresentation of the real, current events. One of its online marketing strategies, apart from successful social media accounts on Facebook and YouTube, is the self-citing and the cross-linking with similar ultraconservative, pro-Spain's unity and anti-immigration websites. This technique allows it to become more visible for the search engine optimization (SEO) of browsers such as Google.

== Founders and contributors ==
Since its creation, Dolça Catalunya has maintained a strong hermeticism and secrecy with regard to its editorial board and its editors. However, it is known that its founder was the columnist Guillermo Elizalde Monroset and that the first article of the portal was published on October 11, 2013, a day before Columbus Day. Elizalde Monroset, president of the Spanish Burke Foundation (considered as part of Spanish Catholic fundamentalism) unveiled his own name as one of the creators of the blog in some of the internal documents that helped to create the so-called constitutionalist organization Societat Civil Catalana (SCC) in 2014. Another organizer of the website was the economist and analyst Jorge Soley Climent, one of the closest political allies of Elizalde Monroset that also acted as vice president at the Burke Foundation, cofounder of SCC, counselor of Reial Club Deportiu Espanyol and was part of the academic and governing body of the Abat Oliba CEU University.

Other pieces of evidence that explain the links between Dolça Catalunya and Societat Civil Catalana, at least during its early years, are that another of the founders of SCC, Jorge Buxadé Villalba (a lawyer educated at the Abat Oliba University who was part of the State Lawyers Corps and run for election with the falangist party Falange Española de las JONS and for the far-right Vox) was the first follower of the Dolça Catalunya account on Twitter. Likewise, the ultraconservative philosopher of the Abat Oliba University, Javier Barraycoa Martínez, who claimed to be another co-founder of SCC and also president of the unionist platform Somatemps, which aims for "the Hispanic identity of Catalonia", has been a contributor to the web since its beginning.

Another contributor that has been related to Dolça Catalunya after journal investigations on the Spanish far-right is the publicist Alejandro del Rosal Valls-Taberner: he acts as the legal owner of the online store of Dolça Catalunya, has worked as communication's staff for the Spanish Episcopal Conference, as an editor for a sports journal about RCD Espanyol, as well as a publisher for Barraycoa Martínez and as a section head for the religious affairs in the conservative header La Razón. Additionally, Joan López Alegre is directly linked as an editor of the blog: he has acted as a professor at the Abat Oliba University, as an MP for the Parliament of Catalonia representing the People's Party and as a European consultant of the liberal party Citizens, as well as an indirect promoter of SCC in its early days. The case of López Alegre slightly differs from the other editors involved, as he has also explicitly got involved in YouTube's direct streaming of Dolça Catalunya, which receives the name of L'hora dolça ('The sweet hour'). In this streamed debate the presence of the cyberologist Miguel Martínez Velasco, an ideologue and spokesperson of the Tabarnia supporting platform, is also common.

Finally, the last two people depicted as usual collaborators with the blog are the playwright Pau Guix, who led the presentations of the book about the web published in 2019, and the ultra-Catholic journalist and activist Jaume Vives i Vives, who participates in the advocacy group Hazte Oír and has been involved in several controversies due to his homophobic and islamophobic public statements.

Among Dolça Catalunya's closest connections, there are multiple mentions and cross-linked articles with the so-called "Christian-neofascist" Germinans Germinabit. This is one of the highlighted blogs from the ultra catholicism in Catalonia that lobby against the Roman Catholic Archdiocese of Barcelona, defends the "purity of Christian values" and advocates against sexual and women's rights, which was involved in episcopals and legal controversies throughout the 2010s.

== Published works ==
In 2019, two of the collaborators of Dolça Catalunya, Javier Barraycoa Martínez and Pau Guix, participated as the leading figures in the promotion throughout Spain of the book on the website, which was also published without any specific authorship and which aims to offer solutions against the Catalan "nationalist yoke" (understood as the Catalan independence movement), coming from the "most read blog in Spain". Several prominent politicians and MPs of the parties Citizens, Vox and the People's Party attended the book presentations and praised its content and ideological discourse as very needed for Catalonia.

- Dolça Catalunya: seny de catalanes para superar el nacionalismo (in Spanish). Madrid: Libros libres. 2019. ISBN 978-84-15570-84-4.

== Bibliography ==
- Borràs i Abelló, Jordi (2015). Desmuntant Societat Civil Catalana (in Catalan). Edicions Saldonar. ISBN 9788494675355.
- Canovaca de la Fuente, Enrique (2020). El periodisme digital amb valor: Claus per a la sostenibilitat de la premsa (in Catalan). Bellaterra; Castelló de la Plana; Barcelona; València: Servei de Publicacions de la Universitat Autònoma de Barcelona. ISBN 978-84-9134-562-6.
- Guío Cerezo, Yolanda (2021). Ideologías excluyentes: pasiones y razones ocultas de la intolerancia al otro (in Spanish). Catarata. ISBN 978-84-8319-692-2.
- Rius Sant, Xavier (2022). Els ultres són aquí (in Catalan). Editorial Pòrtic. ISBN 9788498095104.
- Suárez Villegas, Juan Carlos; Marín Conejo, Sergio (2020). Etica, comunicación y género: debates actuales (in Spanish). Madrid: Dykinson. ISBN 978-84-1324-746-5.
- Thomsen, Andreas; Martínez Lobo, Amelia; Ramos, Miquel (2021). De los neocon a los neonazis: la derecha radical en el Estado español (in Spanish). Madrid: Rosa Luxemburg Stiftung.
