= Ribera d'Ondara =

- Municipality
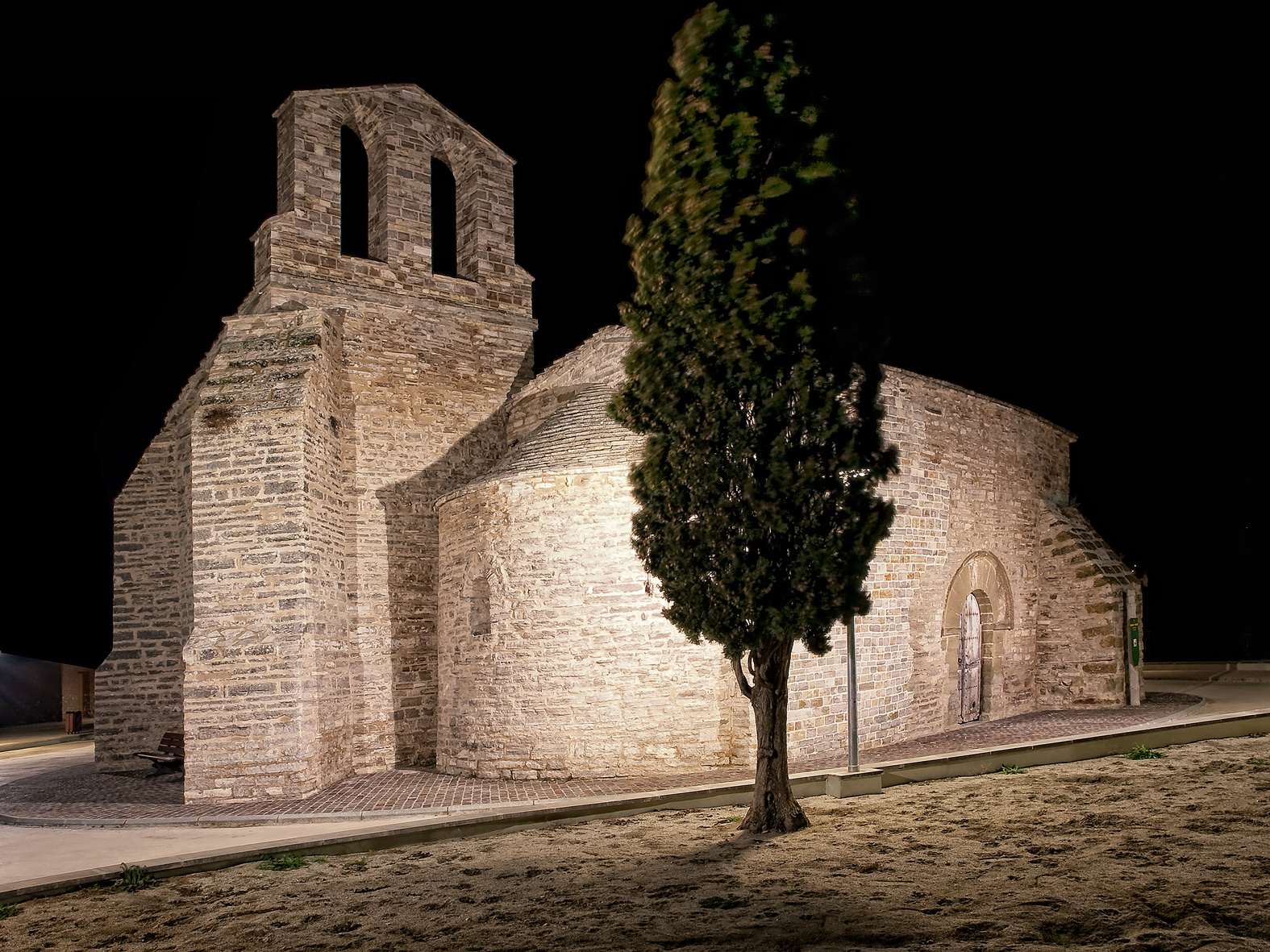
- St. Antolí church, Ribera d'Ondara

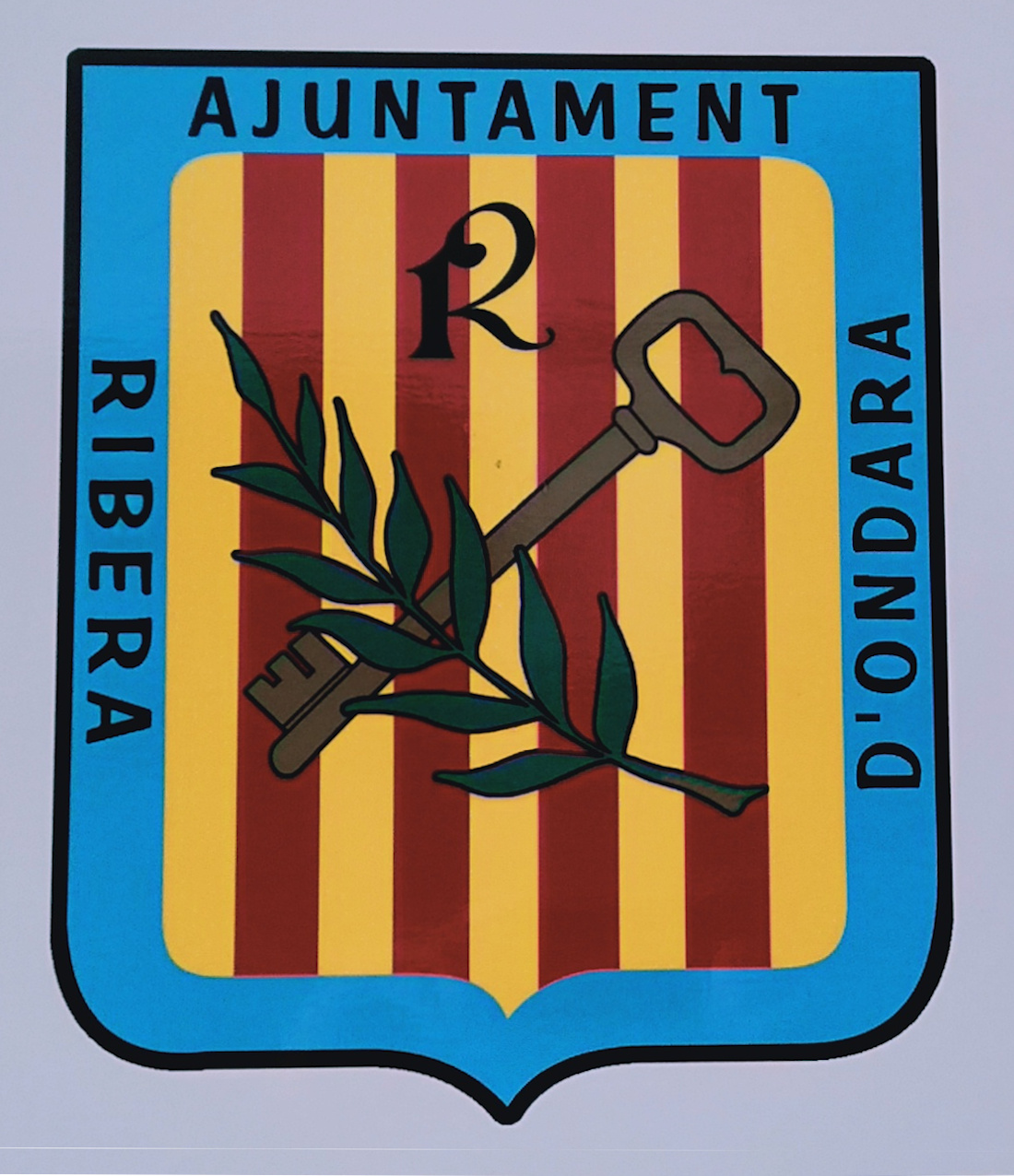
- Coat of arms

- Location in Catalonia
- Coordinates: 41°37′46″N 1°20′35″E
- Country: Spain
- Community: Catalonia
- Province: Lleida
- Comarca: Segarra

Government
  - Mayor: Albert Puig (Catalan Alliance)

Area
  - Total: 54.5 km^{2} (21.0 sq mi)

Population (2025-01-01)
  - Total: 437
  - Density: 8.02/km^{2} (20.8/sq mi)
- Website: riberaondara.ddl.net

Ribera d'Ondara (Catalan pronunciation: [riˈβeɾa ðonˈdaɾa]) is a municipality in the province of Lleida and autonomous community of Catalonia, Spain. The municipality is split into three parts, the biggest central part containing the main town, Sant Antolí i Vilanova.

It has a population of 437 (register office, 2025).
