= Catalan Institute of Finance =

Bank

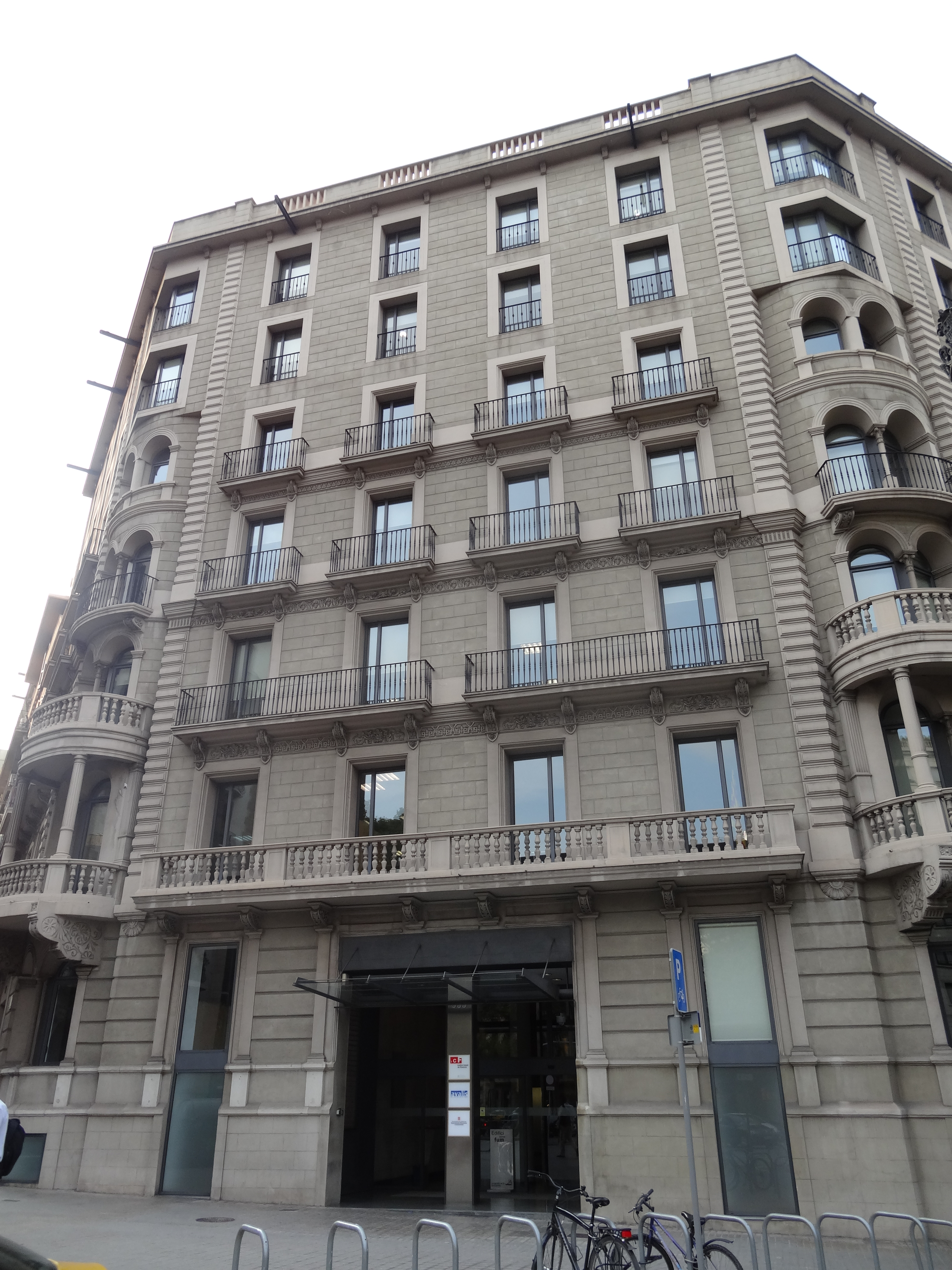
HQ of the Catalan Institute of Finance, placed in Barcelona

Catalan Institute of Finance (Catalan: Institut Català de Finances) or ICF for short, founded in 1985, is a public financial institution 100% owned by the Government of Catalonia. ICF's main objective is to foster the Catalan economy by supporting the country's business base, complementing the role of the private financial sector.

The ICF is a public entity subject to private law. This means that it has its own legal personality and its operations are subject to its own law, the Catalan government-owned enterprise charter and the rest of the legal system. The ICF is regulated by Legislative Decree 4/2002, of 24 December, approving the recast text of the Law on the Institut Català de Finances, of 14 January 1985, subsequently amended on a number of occasions, most significantly by Decree Law 2/2015, of 28 July, and afterwards by Decree Law 4/2015, of 29 December, and by Law 5/2017, of 28 March, on tax, administrative, financial and public sector measures.

The institution's internal governance, structure, procedure and operations are in accordance with the criteria laid down by European banking regulations (mainly Directive 2013/36/EU, Regulation No 575/2013 and Basel III) and national regulations (Law 10/2014, of 26 June, on the planning, supervision and solvency of credit institutions and Royal Decree 84/2015, implementing Law 10/2014).

The highest decision-making body of the Entity is the Governing Board and the CEO. Currently the CEO is Vanessa Servera Planas. In 2022, the ICF Group provided freelancers, businesses and organisations with €663 million in funding. The financing awarded by the ICF Group in 2022 helped to maintain and/or create over to 25700 jobs. As in previous years, 90% of the loans went to SMEs.

== Business model ==
ICF's main objective is to foster the Catalan economy by supporting the country's business base, in particular SMEs and self-employed, complementing the role of the private financial sector. ICF finances projects via loans, guarantees and venture capital investments, among others.

- Loans for companies: loans to fund projects of investment and/or current capital for SMEs, self-employed, companies and institutions.
- Guarantees: providing guarantees for bank loans in order to improve the credit access and conditions for the companies.
- Venture capital investments and participative loans: impulse, manage and participate in venture capital instruments in order to support the creation and growth of companies.

== Grup ICF subsidiaries ==
The ICF Group includes two subsidiaries: IFEM (Financial Instruments for Innovative Companies) and ICF Capital.

- IFEM manages European funds addressed to funding companies of new creation and/or in their initial phases.
- ICF Capital (Managing Society of Entities of Venture Capital), manages, promotes and advises venture capital funds and firms that invest in Catalan companies. The ICF manages through ICF Capital three funds of its own: ICF Capital Expansió II, ICF Venture Tech II, and BCN Emprèn.

Apart from ICF's two wholly owned subsidiaries, the institute also has a stake (alongside other financial institutions and businesses) in Avalis de Catalunya, SGR. Avalis is a reciprocal guarantee company, a public-private venture set up by the Catalan Government in 2003, which provides access to credit by SMEs and self-employed by providing technical and economical guarantees for banks.
