= Emmanuel Faye =

French philosopher

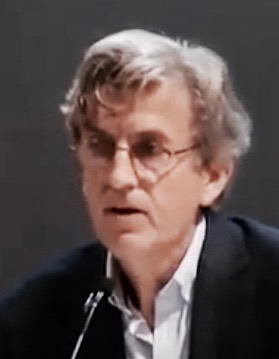
- Born: 1956 (age 69–70)
- Occupation: Philosopher
- Parent: Jean-Pierre Faye

Emmanuel Faye (born in 1956) is a philosopher and historian of French philosophy. A specialist in the Renaissance and Descartes, he has also published several critical studies on Heidegger and his reception.

== Biography ==
=== Family ===
He is the son of the writer and philosopher Jean-Pierre Faye.

=== Training ===
Agrégé in philosophy in 1981, doctor of the Paris 1 Panthéon-Sorbonne University in 1994, authorized to direct research by the Paris Nanterre University in 2000, and an associate professor there from 1995 to 2009. Since 2009, he has been a professor of modern and contemporary philosophy at the University of Rouen Normandy.

=== Career ===
In Philosophy and the Perfection of Man, from the Renaissance to René Descartes, Emmanuel Faye sought to show that the Cartesian thought of the perfection of man was part of the continuity of the humanist philosophies of the Renaissance.

In 2005, Heidegger, the introduction of Nazism into philosophy, was followed by a study by Sidonie Kellerer published in Sens Public, on its reception in Germany.

In 2014, he edited with Beauchesne, in the collection "Le Grenier à sel", an international collective work entitled Heidegger, the soil, the community, the race.

In 2016, he published a study on Hannah Arendt and Martin Heidegger, in which he argues that she “develops a Heideggerian vision of modernity.

=== Critics ===
Justine Lacroix and Jean-Yves Pranchères criticize him for "listing the errors (of Arendt) and his uncritical references to Heidegger". Guillaume Plas considers that certain arguments would go "against not only the spirit of Arendtian texts, but also of their letter". Plas however modifies Faye's text, making him say what he did not say; while Faye writes that Heidegger's "Arendtian apologetics" are today in ruins (Arendt and Heidegger, p.510), Plas makes him say that it is “Arendt's apologetics” which would be in ruins.

On 21 September 2020, the philosopher and Talmudist Ivan Segré published an autobiographical article in the online weekly Lundimatin, where he examines, with regard to his own work, the rigor and relevance of his reading of Heidegger and Arendt. He criticizes Emmanuel Faye for not grasping the substance of Heidegger's metaphysics, as well as for reducing the problem of the Heideggerian comparison (between the Shoah and industrialized agriculture) to a negation of the genocide.

== Books ==
=== Monographies ===
- Philosophie et perfection de l'homme. De la Renaissance à Descartes, Paris, Librairie J. Vrin, « Philologie et Mercure » 1998 ISBN 2-7116-1331-3.
- Heidegger, l'introduction du nazisme dans la philosophie : autour des séminaires inédits de 1933-1935, Paris, Albin Michel, Idées 2005. ISBN 2-226-14252-5 (réédition: Livre de Poche, 2007 ISBN 978-2-253-08382-5 avec une préface inédite et la bibliographie des premières recensions du livre).
- Arendt et Heidegger. Extermination nazie et destruction de la pensée, Paris, Albin Michel, collection « Idées », 14 septembre 2016.

=== Collective works ===
- Hannah Arendt, la révolution et les Droits de l'Homme (Avec Yannick Bosc), Paris, Kimé, 2019.
- Хайдеггер, «Черные тетради» и Россия. Под редакцией Марлен Ларюэль и Эмманюэля Файя. Перевод под научной редакцией Михаила Маяцкого, Москва: Издательский дом «Дело», 2018, 367 p. Heidegger, « Black Notebooks » and Russia, ed. by Marlène Laruelle & Emmanuel Faye. Translations revised by Michail Maiatsky. Moscow: Delo Editions, janvier 2018.
- Heidegger, le sol, la communauté, la race, collection « Le grenier à sel», Paris, Beauchesne, 2014.
- Descartes et la Renaissance, Paris, Champion, 1999 ISBN 2-7453-0132-2.
- Cartésiens et augustiniens au XVIIe siècle, Corpus, revue de philosophie, No. 37, 2000.
- Chemins de la pensée médiévale, Études offertes à Zénon Kaluza, éd. par P.J.J.M. Bakker en coll. avec E. Faye et C. Grellard, Textes et études du Moyen Âge, 20, Turnout, Brepols, 2002.
- Descartes, des principes aux phénomènes, (avec J.-P. Cléro), Armand Colin, collection « Recherches », 2012.
- Rouen, 1662, Montaigne et les Cannibales, (avec J.-C. Arnould), Cérédi, collection « Actes de colloques et Journées d'études », 2013

=== Edition ===
- Antoine Arnauld, Examen d'un écrit qui a pour titre : Traité de l'essence du corps, et de l'union de l'âme avec le corps, contre la philosophie de M. Descartes, Corpus des œuvres de philosophie en langue française, Paris, Fayard, 1999.
- René Descartes, La Recherche de la Vérité par la lumière naturelle, le Livre de Poche, collection « Classiques de la philosophie", traduction et notes par E. Faye, précédée d'un essai introductif: L'invention cartésienne de la conscience, Paris, Librairie Générale Française, 2010 ISBN 978-2-253-06760-3.

== See also ==
- Martin Heidegger
- Hannah Arendt
- Kurt Flasch
