= Spanish unionism =

Political ideology favoring a single Spanish nation-state

Spanish unionism is a term used mainly by the Basque nationalism and Catalan independence movements to refer to the political attitude which opposes independence and favours the continuity of the Kingdom of Spain as a single united nation-state.

Observations regarding the use of the Spanish term unionismo español inside Spain do not apply necessarily to the use outside Spain of the same term or translations like Spanish unionism. They can be disconnected, like, on one hand the Spanish term nacionalista, usually applied to Catalan nationalists and never to Spanish nationalists, and on the other hand the term applied to the Francoist faction of the Spanish Civil War in English and many other languages, whereas Spanish sources prefer to not call the Francoists nacionalista, but bando sublevado, meaning 'rebel faction'.

The expression Spanish unionism has been used as early as March 2009 in the context of the Catalan independence movement. An example of its use by Basque nationalism can be found in April 2009.

The adoption of the term unionism into the Spanish context and its loaded usage with negative connotation relates to attempts to draw parallels with the Orange Order of the Unionist movement in Ireland.

Spanish unionism is considered by Basque and Catalan nationalist parties as a political ideology identified by its denial of the exercise of the right of self-determination of the peripheral nationalities of Spain or sometimes by the simple defense of Spain as a nation. Therefore, the label has been applied to parties such as the People's Party, Spanish Socialist Workers Party (PSOE), Union, Progress and Democracy (UPYD) and Citizens-Party of the Citizenry (C's).

== See also ==
- Anarchism in Spain
- Iberian federalism
- National and regional identity in Spain
- Republicanism in Spain
- Spanish nationalism
- Tabarnia
