= Som Catalans =

Spanish political party

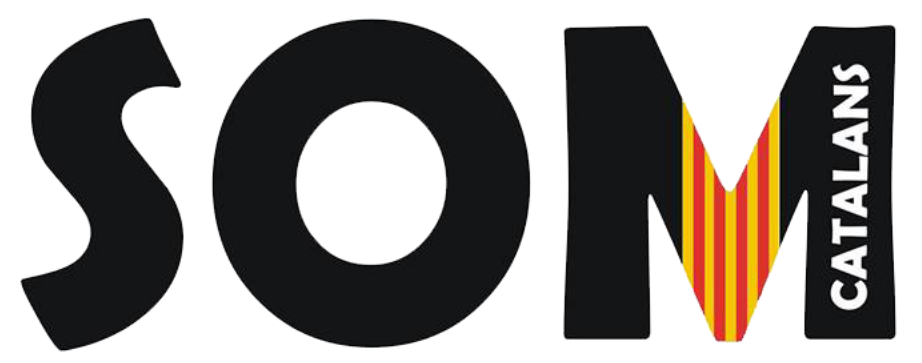
- Founded: 2014
- Split from: Plataforma per Catalunya
- Ideology: Catalan independence
- Political position: Far-right
- Councillors in Catalonia: 0 / 9,069

Som Catalans (SOM; English: "We are Catalans") is a xenophobic and independentist party, active in the Spanish autonomous community of Catalonia and founded in 2014 by Ester Gallego and Enric Ravello, following a scission from Platform for Catalonia.

The party, classified as part of the identitarian movement, maintains relations with other European movements such as Vlaams Belang (Flanders, Belgium), Lega Nord (Italy), and Casal Europa (Northern Catalonia, France).

In the 2015 local elections, the party contested in Vic without obtaining any representation. In the 2019 local elections, the party contested in Llagostera, Sabadell, Sant Feliu de Guíxols and Ripoll without obtaining any representation anywhere.
