= Sílvia Orriols =

Catalan politician (born 1984)

Sílvia Orriols MP
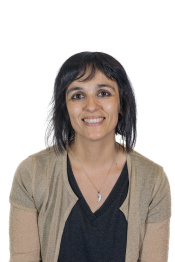
- Official portrait, 2024

Mayor of Ripoll
- Incumbent
- Assumed office 17 June 2023
- Preceded by: Jordi Munell

Member of the Parliament of Catalonia
- Incumbent
- Assumed office 10 June 2024
- Constituency: Girona

President of Catalan Alliance
- Incumbent
- Assumed office 28 October 2020
- Preceded by: Position established
Municipal offices
Member of the Ripollès County Council
Incumbent
Assumed office
17 July 2023
Member of the Ripoll City Council
Incumbent
Assumed office
15 June 2019

Personal details
- Born: Sílvia Orriols Serra; 9 October 1984 (age 41) Vic, Catalonia, Spain
- Party: Catalan Alliance (since 2020)
- Other political affiliations: JERC (2000s); Estat Català (2004–2017); FNC (2017–2020)
- Spouse: David Subirana (sep. 2024)
- Children: 5
- Education: University of Vic

Sílvia Orriols i Serra (Catalan pronunciation: [ˈsilβiə uriˈɔls]; born 9 October 1984) is a Catalan politician from Spain, president of the political party Catalan Alliance. Orriols was elected mayor of Ripoll in June 2023 and elected deputy to the Parliament of Catalonia in May 2024.

== Biography ==
Orriols has a degree in Library and Information Science from the University of Vic and has worked since 2006 as a secretary in a private company. As a politician, she has been active in several political parties. In 2004 she joined the Estat Català lists for the elections to the European Parliament. After the independence referendum in Catalonia in 2017, she was part of the Ripoll protests against the application of article 155, which elevated her profile.

Subsequently, Orriols joined the National Front of Catalonia, a party with which she ran in the 2019 local elections in Ripoll and obtained 503 votes and won one councilor seat. The other parties in the council agreed on a cordon sanitaire, with the commitment not to agree or participate in electoral debates with her. In March 2020, she left the party and continued in the town council as an independent councillor.

In July 2020,Orriols founded a new political party, the Catalan Alliance party, with which she defends the independence of Catalonia and anti-Islam positions; The party considers that immigration is actually an invasion, an idea that is linked to the conspiracy theory of the great replacement.

Orriols ran for mayor of Ripoll in the 2023 local elections. The Catalan Alliance was the most voted party in the municipality, with 6 councillors and more than 30% of the votes. As the leader of the largest party, she would become mayor by default unless an absolute majority of councillors rallied behind a single candidate. Faced with the possibility of her becoming mayor, most of the remaining political forces tried to implement a cordon sanitaire to prevent Orriols from becoming mayor of Ripoll. However, these efforts were ultimately unsuccessful as Junts per Catalunya failed to join the pact, voting for their own candidate, and thus preventing the ERC candidate from achieving the majority of votes needed to prevent Orriols from becoming the municipality's mayor.

Orriols successfully ran in the 2024 Parliament of Catalonia election for Girona, getting one seat, while managing to obtain another one for Lleida for her Catalan Alliance party.
