= Platform for Catalonia =

Platform for Catalonia Plataforma per Catalunya
- Leader: August Armengol Rofes
- Founder: Josep Anglada
- Founded: 5 April 2002
- Dissolved: 16 February 2019
- Merged into: Vox
- Headquarters: 10 Jacint Verdaguer St. 08500 Vic, Barcelona
- Ideology: Euroscepticism; Spanish unionism Populism; Anti-Islam
- Political position: Far-right

Website
- www.plataforma.cat

Platform for Catalonia (Catalan: Plataforma per Catalunya, PxC) was a far-right political party rooted in Catalonia, Spain, which centred its political agenda around controlling immigration and was opposed to Catalan independence. It was strongly anti-Islamic and was widely considered a racist, xenophobic political force. Its leader was Josep Anglada, town councillor in Vic.

PxC had eight local representatives, often in cities with tensions between locals and immigrants. They did not have any representatives at the provincial, regional or national level. In 2014, the faction of PxC supporting Catalan independence splintered to form a new far-right pro-independence party called "Som Catalans" (We are Catalans). PxC merged with the Spanish nationalist party VOX in February 2019.

== History ==
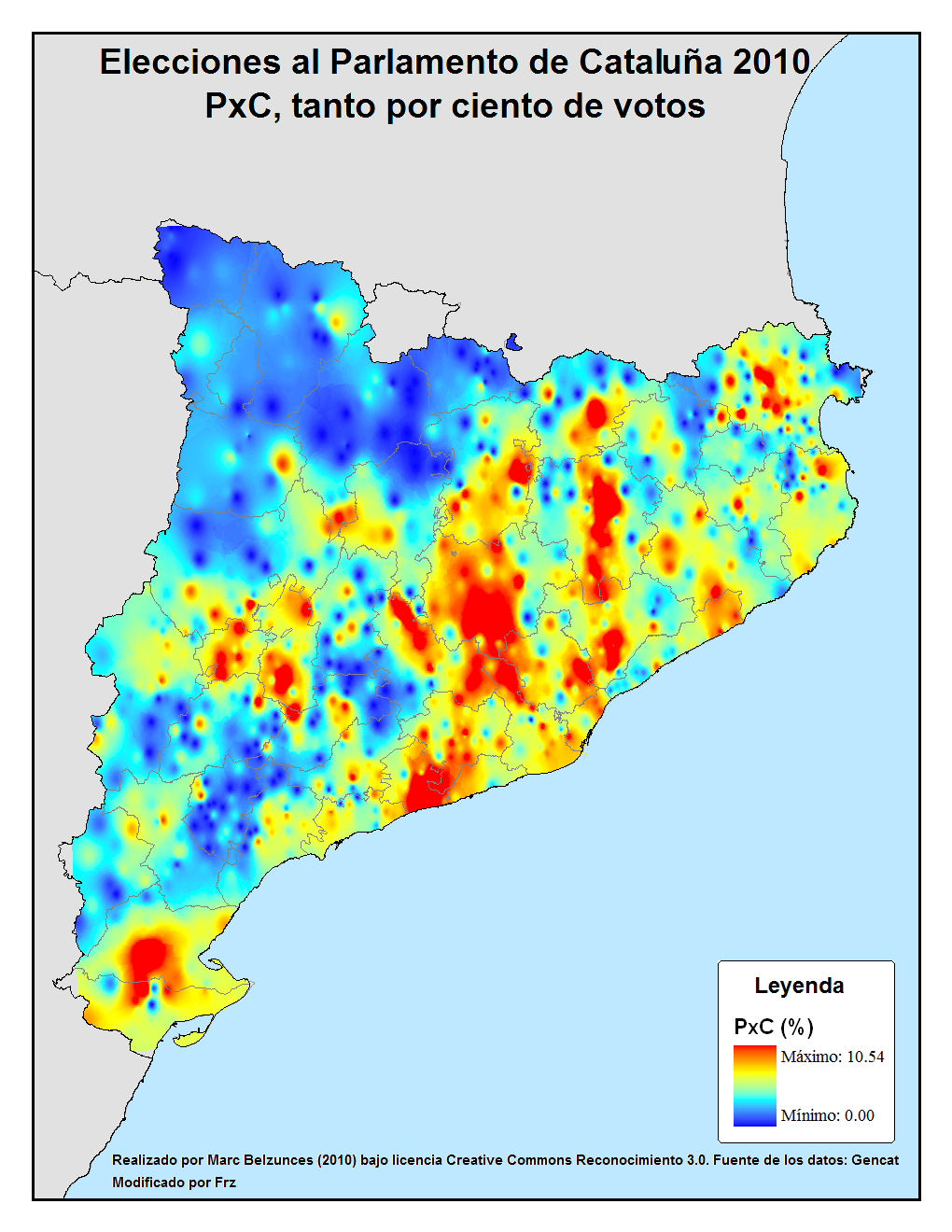
PxC results in the Catalan parliamentary election, 2010. Areas of highest support in red and lowest in blue.

Anglada started the party on 15 January 2001 as the Plataforma Vigatana (Platform for Vic). In 2002, philosopher Jaume Farrerons joined the party and became its founding ideologue and first general secretary. The PxC entered their first municipal elections in 2003, winning one seat in five respective cities. Cervera in Lleida province gave the largest percentage to the party, at 9.2%.

In the 2010 Catalan parliamentary election, they received 2.4% of votes, falling 15,000 votes short of entering Parliament.

In the 2011 local elections, PxC got 65,905 votes, and grew from 17 to 67 councillors. Two were elected in Hospitalet de Llobregat, Catalonia's second-largest city. Three were elected in Santa Coloma de Gramenet, which along with the two in Hospitalet constitute the PxC's first representation in Greater Barcelona. Mataró, in Barcelona province, had the highest percentage voting for the party (10.49%, three seats). In Vic, the PxC grew from four to five councillors, making them the city's second-largest party after Convergence and Union.

=== Splits ===
In 2014, then longtime president Josep Anglada was kicked out from the party for "management deficiency". The same year, members of the party supportive of the Catalan independence movement left to found their own political party: Som Catalans ("We are Catalans").

In 2016, Anglada would go on to found a new party: Som Identitaris, which would successfully run in the subsequent municipal elections in Vic and Manlleu. For the 2019 European Parliament election in Spain, Som Identitaris endorsed ADÑ–Spanish Identity, urging supporters to vote for them.

=== Failed attempt at national expansion ===
Parties affiliated with the PxC were set up in other regions of Spain, however they have not obtained any electoral success. The Platform for Madrid (Spanish: Plataforma por Madrid, PxM) cut off its links to Anglada's party in March 2006.

In 2012, Anglada announced the launch of the Platform for Freedom (Spanish: Plataforma por la Libertad, PxL) an expansion of the party into the rest of Spain. Anglada and the PxL have protested against the construction of mosques in Spain. Plataforma por la Libertad was refounded in 2013 as the Party for Freedom.

=== Dissolution ===
On 16 February 2019, PxC was absorbed into Vox.

== Ideology ==
PxC was a self-described identitarian party which employed anti-Muslim rhetoric and has been considered to have had a "counter-jihad agenda". In 2011 the PxC were investigated after ordering a "Night of the Long Knives" against Muslim clerics in Catalonia. The party leader was also investigated for calling for the expulsion of all Muslims from Spain.

The PxC councillor in Salt, Girona, voted against criminalising homophobia in the city in 2013.

The PxC took a stance against the enquiry for the political future of Catalonia of 2014, also known as 9-N, which the party considered an illegal attempt of secession of the autonomous community with respect to the rest of Spain.

== International relations ==
At their 2008 Congress, the PxC invited the Vlaams Belang of Belgium and the Lega Nord of Italy to attend. In 2012, a senior PxC member congratulated the Golden Dawn of Greece on their general election results. In 2010 the party signed a friendship agreement with the Freedom Party of Austria in order to counter the "Islamisation of Europe."

== Electoral performance ==
=== Parliament of Catalonia ===
Parliament of Catalonia
Election	Leading candidate	Votes	%	Seats	+/–	Government
2010	Josep Anglada	75,134	2.40 (#8)	0 / 135	New	No seats
2012	Josep Anglada	60,107	1.65 (#8)	0 / 135	0	No seats

=== Municipalities ===
Data	Catalonia		
Data	Votes	%	Seats
2003	2,535	0.08	4 / 8,932
2007	12,447	0.43	17 / 8,932
2011	65,905	2.3	67 / 9,137
2015	27,348	0.88	8 / 9,077
