= Josep Anglada =

Far-right politician from Spain

Josep Anglada Rius
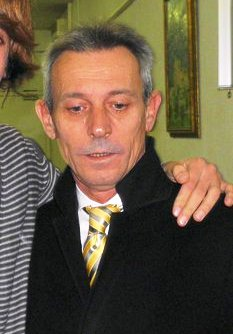

Member of the Vic City Council
- Incumbent
- Assumed office 17 June 2023
- In office June 2003 – 21 June 2019

President of Platform for Catalonia
- In office 27 October 2002 – 8 February 2014
- Preceded by: Position established
- Succeeded by: Xavier Simó (acting)

Personal details
- Born: 21 June 1959 Vic, Spain
- Party: Som Identitaris (since 2016)
- Other political affiliations: Platform for Catalonia (2002–2014); National Front (1988–1992); New Force (until 1982)

Josep Anglada Rius (born 21 June 1959 in Vic) is a Spanish far-right politician from Catalonia. He began his political career in the Spanish nationalist, ultra-Catholic, Francoist-leaning party Fuerza Nueva, effectively assuming the role of Blas Piñar's foremost representative in Catalonia, and is the founder and long-standing president of the party Platform for Catalonia. He was leader of the party till 2014 when he was expelled for "management deficiency". In 2017 he was sentenced to 2 years of prison for threatening in Twitter an adolescent activist of Arran. In 2018 he was found guilty on a charge for data disclosure and sentenced to 1 year of prison.
