= 2024 Catalan regional election =

Election in the Spanish region of Catalonia

- 12 May 2024

All 135 seats in the Parliament of Catalonia 68 seats needed for a majority
- Opinion polls
- Registered: 5,754,987 ▲2.3%
- Turnout: 3,183,137 (55.3%) ▲4.0 pp

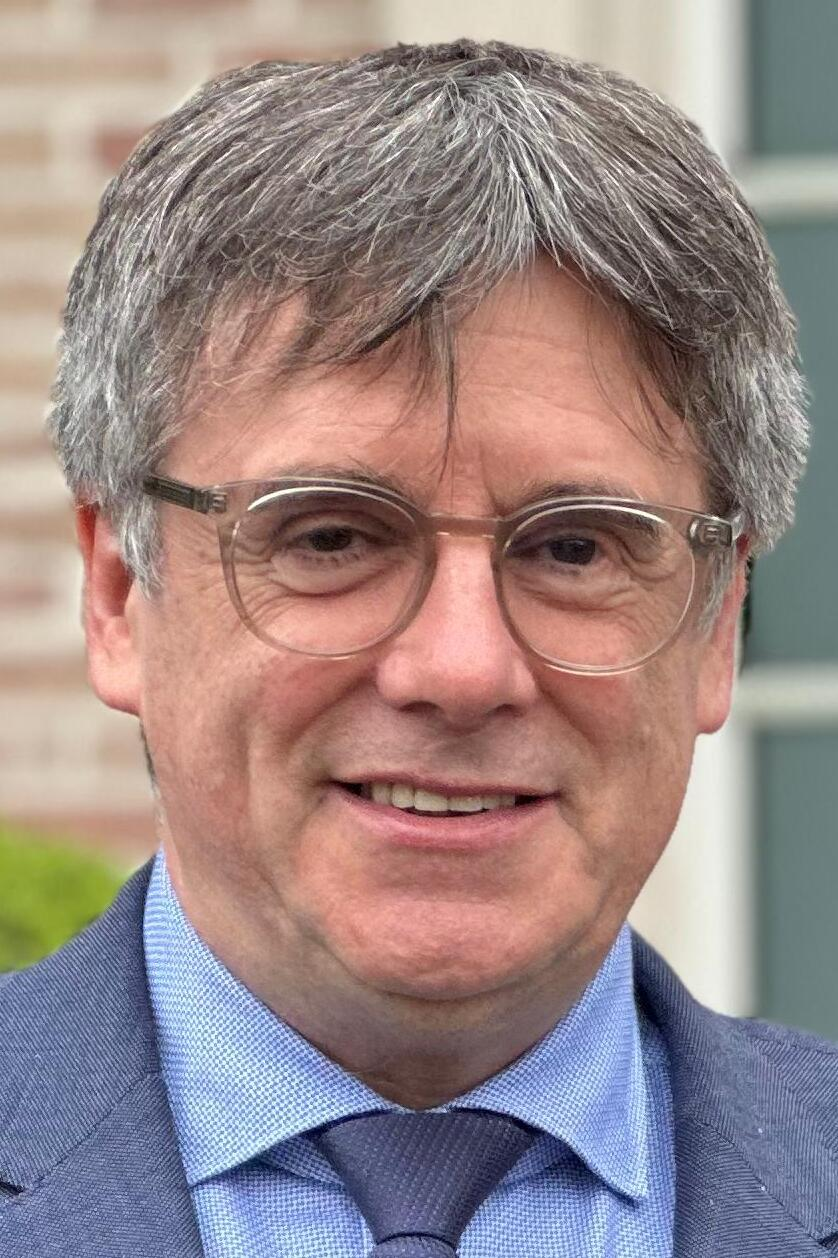

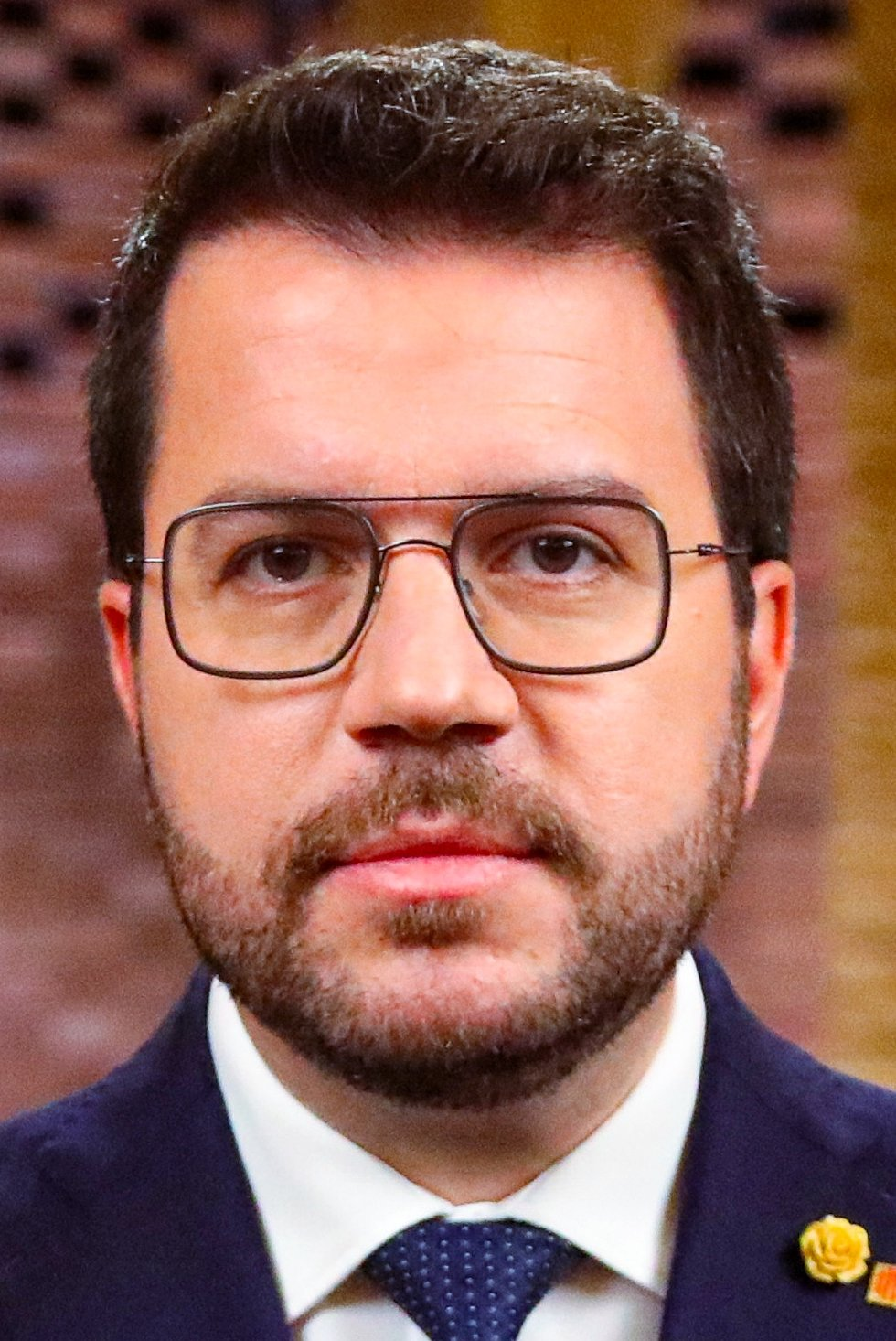

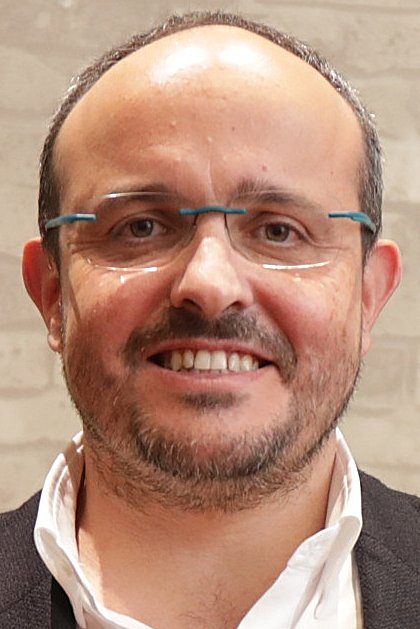

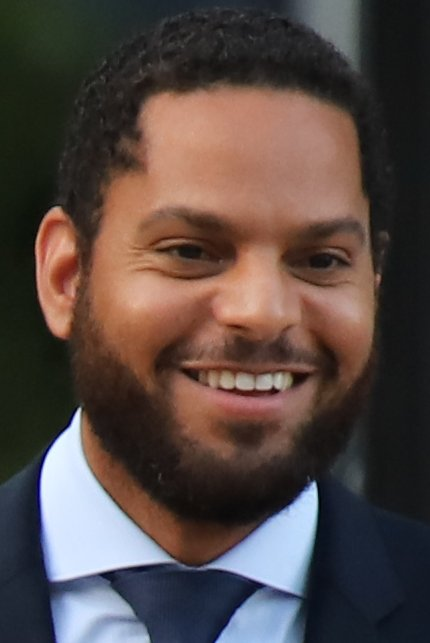

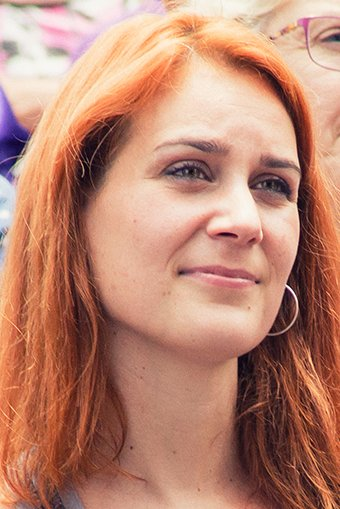

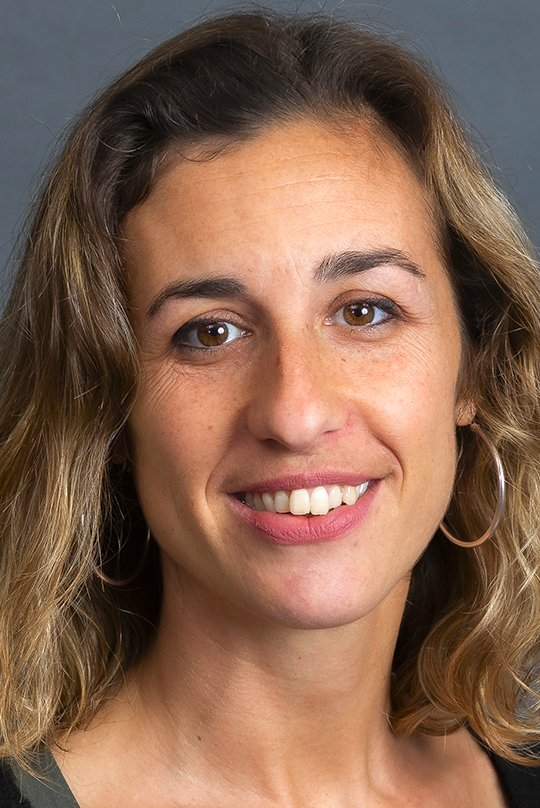

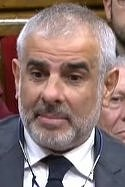
| | First party | Second party | Third party |
|---|---|---|---|
| Leader | Salvador Illa | Carles Puigdemont | Pere Aragonès |
| Party | PSC–PSOE | Cat–Junts+ | ERC |
| Leader since | 30 December 2020 | 21 March 2024 | 20 November 2020 |
| Leader's seat | Barcelona | Barcelona | Barcelona |
| Last election | 33 seats, 23.0% | 32 seats, 20.1% | 33 seats, 21.3% |
| Seats won | 42 | 35 | 20 |
| Seat change | ▲9 | ▲3 | ▼13 |
| Popular vote | 882,589 | 681,470 | 431,128 |
| Percentage | 28.0% | 21.6% | 13.7% |
| Swing | ▲5.0 pp | ▲1.5 pp | ▼7.6 pp |
| | Fourth party | Fifth party | Sixth party |
| Leader | Alejandro Fernández | Ignacio Garriga | Jéssica Albiach |
| Party | PP | Vox | Comuns Sumar |
| Leader since | 10 November 2018 | 10 August 2020 | 18 September 2018 |
| Leader's seat | Barcelona | Barcelona | Barcelona |
| Last election | 3 seats, 3.8% | 11 seats, 7.7% | 8 seats, 6.9% (Note: Results for ECP–PEC in the 2021 election.) |
| Seats won | 15 | 11 | 6 |
| Seat change | ▲12 | 0 | ▼2 |
| Popular vote | 347,170 | 251,096 | 184,297 |
| Percentage | 11.0% | 8.0% | 5.8% |
| Swing | ▲7.2 pp | ▲0.3 pp | ▼1.1 pp |
| | Seventh party | Eighth party | Ninth party |
| Leader | Laia Estrada | Sílvia Orriols | Carlos Carrizosa |
| Party | CUP–DT | Aliança.cat | Cs |
| Leader since | 25 March 2024 | 28 October 2020 | 19 August 2020 |
| Leader's seat | Barcelona | Girona | Barcelona (lost) |
| Last election | 9 seats, 6.7% | Did not contest | 6 seats, 5.6% |
| Seats won | 4 | 2 | 0 |
| Seat change | ▼5 | ▲2 | ▼6 |
| Popular vote | 129,059 | 119,149 | 22,947 |
| Percentage | 4.1% | 3.8% | 0.7% |
| Swing | ▼2.7 pp | New party | ▼4.9 pp |
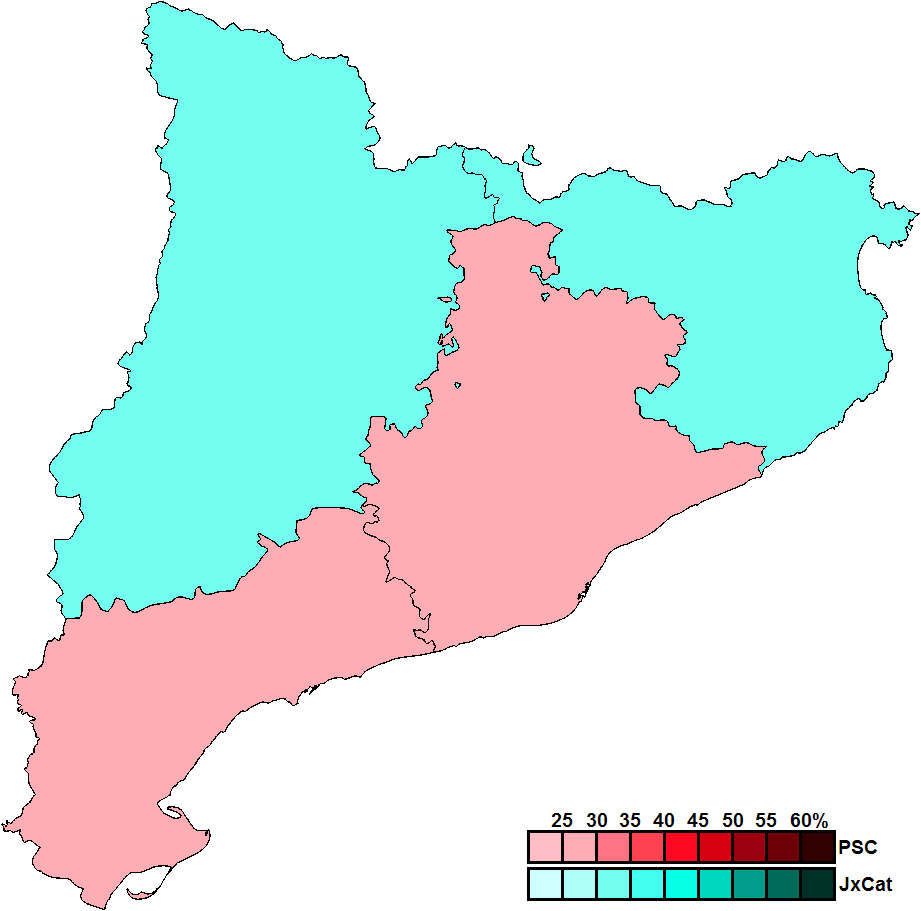
President before election
Pere Aragonès
ERC
President after election
Salvador Illa
PSC

A regional election was held in Catalonia on 12 May 2024 to elect the 15th Parliament of the autonomous community. All 135 seats in the Parliament were up for election.

The coalition government formed by Republican Left of Catalonia (ERC) and Together for Catalonia (Junts) had broken up in October 2022, with president Pere Aragonès having to rely in the support of the Socialists' Party of Catalonia (PSC) and In Common We Can (ECP) for stability. After the Catalan government failed to pass the regional budget in Parliament on 13 March 2024, as a result of differences with ECP over the Hard Rock mega resort, Aragonès announced a snap election for 12 May.

Salvador Illa's PSC secured a commanding victory in both votes and seats in a Catalan regional election for the first time in history, whereas support for Catalan nationalist parties in general—and for ERC and the Popular Unity Candidacy (CUP) in particular—collapsed, bringing their combined totals well below the absolute majority threshold for the first time since 1980. The conservative People's Party (PP) surged from three to 15 seats, benefiting from the wipeout of Citizens (Cs), whereas the far-right, pro-independence Catalan Alliance (Aliança.cat) party of Sílvia Orriols was able to secure parliamentary representation thanks to strong support in traditionally pro-independence strongholds. Illa was elected as new president on 8 August 2024 with the support of ERC and Comuns Sumar and amidst a failed attempt by Puigdemont to thwart his investiture by returning to Barcelona while evading Spanish and Catalan police forces.

The election outcome and Illa's election were widely seen as signaling the end of the Catalan independence process starting in 2012 and seeing at its height a major constitutional crisis in Spain and its subsequent trials. The conciliation policies carried out by the Spanish government of Pedro Sánchez, as well as the controversial amnesty law that was agreed for in the 2023 Spanish government formation process, were said to be among the factors that influenced the loss of the pro-independence majority.

== Overview ==
Under the 2006 Statute of Autonomy, the Parliament of Catalonia was the unicameral legislature of the homonymous autonomous community, having legislative power in devolved matters, as well as the ability to grant or withdraw confidence from a regional president. The electoral and procedural rules were supplemented by national law provisions.

=== Date ===
The term of the Parliament of Catalonia expired four years after the date of its previous election, unless it was dissolved earlier. The election was required to be called no later than 15 days before the scheduled expiration date of parliament, with election day taking place between 40 and 60 days from the call. The previous election was held on 14 February 2021, which meant that the chamber's term would have expired on 14 February 2025. The election was required to be called no later than 30 January 2025, setting the latest possible date for election day on 31 March 2025.

The regional president had the prerogative to dissolve the Parliament of Catalonia at any given time and call a snap election, provided that no motion of no confidence was in process and that dissolution did not occur before one year after a previous one under this procedure. In the event of an investiture process failing to elect a regional president within a two-month period from the first ballot, the Parliament was to be automatically dissolved and a fresh election called.

After the Catalan government failed to pass the regional budget on 13 March 2024, president Pere Aragonès announced a snap election. The Parliament of Catalonia was officially dissolved on 19 March 2024 with the publication of the corresponding decree in the Official Journal of the Government of Catalonia (DOGC), setting election day for 12 May.

=== Electoral system ===
Voting for the Parliament was based on universal suffrage, comprising all Spanish nationals over 18 years of age, registered in Catalonia and with full political rights, provided that they had not been deprived of the right to vote by a final sentence. Amendments in 2022 abolished the "begged" voting system (Spanish: Voto rogado), under which non-resident citizens were required to apply for voting. The begged vote system was attributed responsibility for a major decrease in the turnout of Spaniards abroad during the years it was in force.

The Parliament of Catalonia had a minimum of 100 and a maximum of 150 seats, with electoral provisions fixing its size at 135. All were elected in four multi-member constituencies—corresponding to the provinces of Barcelona, Girona, Lleida and Tarragona, each of which was assigned a fixed number of seats—using the D'Hondt method and closed-list proportional voting, with a three percent-threshold of valid votes (including blank ballots) in each constituency. The use of this electoral method resulted in a higher effective threshold depending on district magnitude and vote distribution.

As a result of the aforementioned allocation, each Parliament constituency was entitled the following seats:

| Seats | Constituencies |
|---|---|
| 85 | Barcelona |
| 18 | Tarragona |
| 17 | Girona |
| 15 | Lleida |

The law did not provide for by-elections to fill vacant seats; instead, any vacancies arising after the proclamation of candidates and during the legislative term were filled by the next candidates on the party lists or, when required, by designated substitutes.

=== Outgoing parliament ===
The table below shows the composition of the parliamentary groups in the chamber at the time of dissolution.

Parliamentary composition in March 2024
| Groups | Parties | Legislators | |
| Groups | Parties | Seats | Total |
|---|---|---|---|
| Socialists' and United to Advance; Parliamentary Group | PSC | 32 | 33 |
| Socialists' and United to Advance; Parliamentary Group | Els Units | 1 | 33 |
| Republican Parliamentary Group | ERC | 33 | 33 |
| Together for Catalonia's Parliamentary Group | JxCat | 27 | 31 |
| Together for Catalonia's Parliamentary Group | DC | 2 | 31 |
| Together for Catalonia's Parliamentary Group | AxR | 1 | 31 |
| Together for Catalonia's Parliamentary Group | IdE | 1 | 31 |
| Vox's Parliamentary Group in Catalonia | Vox | 10 | 10 |
| Popular Unity Candidacy–A New Cycle to Win's; Parliamentary Group | CUP | 8 | 9 |
| Popular Unity Candidacy–A New Cycle to Win's; Parliamentary Group | Guanyem | 1 | 9 |
| In Common We Can's Parliamentary Group | CatComú | 7 | 8 |
| In Common We Can's Parliamentary Group | Podem | 1 | 8 |
| Citizens's Parliamentary Group | CS | 6 | 6 |
| Mixed Group | PP | 3 | 3 |
| Non-Inscrits | INDEP | 2 (Note: Cristina Casol, former JxCat legislator, and Antonio Gallego, former Vox legislator.) | 2 |

== Parties and candidates ==
The electoral law allowed for parties and federations registered in the interior ministry, alliances and groupings of electors to present lists of candidates. Parties and federations intending to form an alliance were required to inform the relevant electoral commission within 10 days of the election call, whereas groupings of electors needed to secure the signature of at least one percent of the electorate in the constituencies for which they sought election, disallowing electors from signing for more than one list. Concurrently, parties, federations or alliances that had not obtained a parliamentary mandate at the preceding election were required to secure the signature of at least 0.1 percent of electors in the aforementioned constituencies. Additionally, a balanced composition of men and women was required in the electoral lists, so that candidates of either sex made up at least 40 percent of the total composition.

Below is a list of the main parties and alliances which contested the election:

| Candidacy | Parties and alliances | Leading candidate | Ideology | Previous result | | Gov. | Ref. |
| Candidacy | Parties and alliances | Leading candidate | Ideology | Vote % | Seats | Gov. | Ref. |
|---|---|---|---|---|---|---|---|
| PSC–PSOE | List: Socialists' Party of Catalonia (PSC–PSOE); United to Advance (Els Units) | Salvador Illa | Social democracy | 23.0% | 33 | No | |
| ERC | List: Republican Left of Catalonia (ERC) | Pere Aragonès | Catalan independence Left-wing nationalism Social democracy | 21.3% | 33 | Yes | |
| Cat–Junts+ | List: Together for Catalonia (JxCat) – Action for the Republic (AxR) – Left Movement of Catalonia (MESCat) – Independence Rally (RI.cat) – Catalan State (EC) – Republican Youth of Lleida (JRL); Democrats of Catalonia (DC) | Carles Puigdemont | Catalan independence Populism | 20.1% | 32 | No | |
| Vox | List: Vox (Vox) | Ignacio Garriga | Right-wing populism Ultranationalism; National conservatism | 7.7% | 11 | No | |
| CUP–DT | List: Popular Unity Candidacy (CUP) – Forward–Socialist Organization of National Liberation (Endavant–OSAN) – Free People (PL–PPCC); Let's Reverse (Capgirem) | Laia Estrada | Catalan independence Anti-capitalism; Socialism | 6.7% | 9 | No | |
| Comuns; Sumar | List: Catalonia in Common (CatComú) – Barcelona in Common (BComú) – United Left Catalonia (EUCat) – Greens Equo (Verds Equo) – Green Left (EV); Unite Movement (SMR) | Jéssica Albiach | Left-wing populism Green politics | 6.9% | 8 | No | |
| Cs | List: Citizens–Party of the Citizenry (Cs) | Carlos Carrizosa | Liberalism | 5.6% | 6 | No | |
| PP | List: People's Party (PP) | Alejandro Fernández | Conservatism; Christian democracy | 3.8% | 3 | No | |
| Aliança.cat | List: Catalan Alliance (Aliança.cat) | Sílvia Orriols | Catalan independence Anti-immigration; Hispanophobia | Did not contest | | No | |

Ahead of the election, it was revealed that the People's Party (PP) and Citizens–Party of the Citizenry (Cs) were negotiating an electoral alliance that could be extended to the European Parliament election in June as well, but talks broke down on 22 March—causing the resignation of Adrián Vázquez as secretary-general of CS—after the regional branch of CS in Catalonia rejected its dissolution. The PP was also concerned on whether to keep Alejandro Fernández as the party's candidate or to replace him by another figure, such as former Health minister Dolors Montserrat. On 26 March, the PP confirmed Fernández as the party's candidate and Montserrat as campaign manager.

On 21 March, Together for Catalonia (Junts) leader Carles Puigdemont, who fled to Belgium to avoid charges brought by Spanish authorities following the unrecognized referendum on Catalan independence from Spain in 2017, held a rally in Elne, France, near the Spanish border, saying that he would stand for office in the Parliament of Catalonia and seek to become regional president, which he had previously held prior to his exile. On 26 March, Puigdemont announced the "Vernet Accord", an electoral alliance between Junts and several minor pro-independence parties: his former allies of Action for the Republic (AxR), The Greens–Green Alternative (EV–AV), Independence Rally (RI.cat), Democrats of Catalonia (DC) and Left Movement of Catalonia (MESCat), and new ones such as Catalan State (EC) and Republican Youth of Lleida (JRL). The next day, it was revealed that Puigdemont would run under the "Together+Puigdemont for Catalonia" (Cat–Junts+) platform. Later, EV–AV announced that their party had not signed nor negotiated the alliance and were not a part of Junts since 2020. Puigdemont pledged to return to Spain for the election of the Catalan presidency, by which time he expects to avail of a proposed amnesty on Catalan separatists raised by Prime Minister Pedro Sanchez. Puigdemont also pledged to retire from politics if he loses the election.

On 25 March, Catalan Alliance, a far-right party that led the local governments in the municipalities of Ripoll and Ribera d'Ondara, announced that they would be contesting the election with their leader, Sílvia Orriols, as their main candidate.

On 27 March, Podemos announced that they would not contest the election. The party had contested previous elections within the En Comú Podem alliance, alongside Catalonia in Common (CatComú). In a statement, the party stated that they did not wish to contribute to the fragmentation of the left-wing vote, as it had intended to contest the election on its own if an agreement could not be reached with their previous election partners, while blaming Catalunya en Comú for making an agreement "impossible". The relationship of Podemos with other Spanish left-wing parties had been deteriorating since it broke with the Sumar coalition and joined the Mixed Group in the Spanish Congress of Deputies. Following Podemos' withdrawal, CatComú and Sumar announced a joint list for the election under the name Comuns Sumar, with Jéssica Albiach as their main candidate.

On 8 May, PSC, ERC, Junts, Comuns Sumar and CUP announced an Acord antifeixista (English: "Anti-fascist Accord"), an agreement that those parties would not enter into any coalition with Catalan Alliance or Vox.

== Campaign ==
=== Timetable ===
The key dates are listed below (all times are CET):

- 18 March: The election decree is issued with the countersign of the president, after deliberation in the Executive Council.
- 19 March: Formal dissolution of parliament and start of prohibition period on the inauguration of public works, services or projects.
- 22 March: Initial constitution of provincial and zone electoral commissions with judicial members.
- 25 March: Division of constituencies into polling sections and stations.
- 29 March: Deadline for parties and federations to report on their electoral alliances.
- 1 April: Deadline for electoral register consultation for the purpose of possible corrections.
- 8 April: Deadline for parties, federations, alliances, and groupings of electors to present electoral lists.
- 10 April: Publication of submitted electoral lists in the Official Journal of the Government of Catalonia (DOGC).
- 15 April: Official proclamation of validly submitted electoral lists.
- 16 April: Publication of proclaimed electoral lists in the DOGC.
- 17 April: Deadline for the selection of polling station members by sortition.
- 25 April: Deadline for the appointment of non-judicial members to provincial and zone electoral commissions.
- 26 April: Official start of electoral campaigning.
- 2 May: Deadline to apply for postal voting.
- 7 May: Start of legal ban on electoral opinion polling publication; deadline for non-resident citizens (electors residing abroad (CERA) and citizens temporarily absent from Spain) to vote by mail.
- 8 May: Deadline for postal and temporarily absent voting.
- 9 May: Deadline for CERA voting.
- 10 May: Last day of electoral campaigning.
- 11 May: Official election silence ("reflection day").
- 12 May: Election day (polling stations open at 9 am and close at 8 pm or once voters present in a queue at/outside the polling station at 8 pm have cast their vote); provisional vote counting.
- 17 May: Start of general vote counting, including CERA votes.
- 20 May: Deadline for the general vote counting.
- 29 May: Deadline for the proclamation of elected members.
- 1 June: Deadline for the reconvening of parliament.
- 7 July: Deadline for the publication of definitive election results in the DOGC.

=== Party slogans ===
| Party or alliance | Original slogan | English translation | Ref. |
|---|---|---|---|
| PSC–PSOE | « Força per governar » | "Strength to govern" | |
| ERC | « Al costat de la gent. Al costat de Catalunya » | "On the side of the people. On the side of Catalonia" | |
| Cat–Junts+ | « Catalunya necessita [...] » (Note: The party launched a multi-message slogan, with a number of interchangeable expressions: Catalan: Catalunya necessita lideratge (English: "Catalonia needs leadership"); Catalan: Catalunya necessita bon Govern (English: "Catalonia needs good Government"); Catalan: Catalunya necessita fer-se respectar (English: "Catalonia needs to make itself respected"); Catalan: Catalunya necessita viure en català (English: "Catalonia needs to live in Catalan"); Catalan: Catalunya necessita la independència (English: "Catalonia needs the independence")) | "Catalonia needs [...]" | |
| Vox | « En defensa propia » | "In self-defence" | |
| CUP–DT | « Defensem la terra. Un altre país és possible » | "Let's defend the land. Another country is possible" | |
| Comuns Sumar | « La Catalunya que ve » | "The Catalonia that is coming" | |
| Cs | « Detenlos » | "Stop/Arrest them" (Note: Spanish detener has double meaning. In reference to Pedro Sánchez and Carles Puigdemont, "stopping" the former and "arresting" the latter.) | |
| PP | « Volem una Catalunya de Primera » | "We want a First-class Catalonia" | |
| Aliança.cat | « Salvem Catalunya » | "Let's save Catalonia" | |

=== Debates ===
2024 Catalan regional election debates
| Date | Organizer(s) | Moderator(s) | P Present (Note: Denotes a main invitee attending the event.) S Surrogate (Note: Denotes a main invitee not attending the event, sending a surrogate in their place.) NI Not invited I Invited A Absent invitee | | | | | | | | | |
| Date | Organizer(s) | Moderator(s) | PSC | ERC | Junts+ | Vox | Comuns | CUP | Cs | PP | Audience | Ref. |
|---|---|---|---|---|---|---|---|---|---|---|---|---|
| 15 April | PIMEC | Cristina Riba | P Illa | P Aragonès | S Rull | NI | P Albiach | NI | NI | P Fernández | — | |
| 26 April | RAC 1 La Vanguardia | Enric Sierra; Jordi Basté | P Illa | P Aragonès | S Rull | P Garriga | P Albiach | P Estrada | P Carrizosa | P Fernández | — | |
| 29 April | ON Economia | Xavier Alegret | S Romero | S Mas | S Rull | NI | S Gallego | S Vega | NI | S Rodríguez | — | |
| 29 April | CAC | Germán González | S Pedret | S Balsera | S Jubert | S Macián | S García | S Pellicer | S Reina | S Esteller | — | |
| 29 April | XES; AMEP | Georgina Pujol | S Riba | S Villalbí | S Canadell | NI | S Badia | S Saladié | S Bravo | S Rodríguez | — | |
| 2 May | RTVE | Gemma Nierga; Xabier Fortes | P Illa | P Aragonès | S Rull | P Garriga | P Albiach | P Estrada | P Carrizosa | P Fernández | 7.6% (130,000) (Note: In Catalonia, the debate was broadcast on La 1 (117,000; 6.8%) and 24 Horas (13,000; 0.8%). Nationwide, the debate was broadcast on 24 Horas (109,000; 0.9%).) | |
| 2 May | PL | Sílvia Barroso | S Niubó | S Vila | S Ten | NI | S Bárcena | S Riera | NI | S Martín | — | |
| 6 May | laSexta | Ana Pastor | P Illa | P Aragonès | S Rull | P Garriga | P Albiach | S Vega | P Carrizosa | P Fernández | 9.1% (165,000) (Note: The debate was broadcast nationwide, obtaining an audience of 5.8% (720,000).) | |
| 6 May | CNDC | Eugènia Bretones | S Diaz | S Balsera | S Freixa | NI | S Segovia | S Gibert | NI | S Higuera | — | |
| 7 May | CCMA | Ariadna Oltra | P Illa | P Aragonès | S Rull | P Garriga | P Albiach | P Estrada | P Carrizosa | P Fernández | 22.1% (358,000) | |
| 8 May | No en Raja | Anna Ramon | S Riba | S Villalbí | S Feliu | NI | S Mijoler | S Cornellà | S Ciprian | S García | — | |

== Opinion polls ==
The tables below list opinion polling results in reverse chronological order, showing the most recent first and using the dates when the survey fieldwork was done, as opposed to the date of publication. Where the fieldwork dates are unknown, the date of publication is given instead. The highest percentage figure in each polling survey is displayed with its background shaded in the leading party's colour. If a tie ensues, this is applied to the figures with the highest percentages. The "Lead" column on the right shows the percentage-point difference between the parties with the highest percentages in a poll.

=== Graphical summary ===
Local regression trend line of poll results from 14 February 2021 to 12 May 2024, with each line corresponding to a political party.

=== Voting intention estimates ===
The table below lists weighted voting intention estimates. Refusals are generally excluded from the party vote percentages, while question wording and the treatment of "don't know" responses and those not intending to vote may vary between polling organisations. When available, seat projections determined by the polling organisations are displayed below (or in place of) the percentages in a smaller font; 68 seats were required for an absolute majority in the Parliament of Catalonia.

Color key:

Poll conducted after legal ban on opinion polls

| Polling firm/Commissioner | Fieldwork date | Sample size | Turnout | PSC | ERC | Junts | Vox | ECP | CUP | Cs | PP | PDeCAT | Podem | Valents | Aliança.cat | Alhora | Lead |
|---|---|---|---|---|---|---|---|---|---|---|---|---|---|---|---|---|---|
| 2024 regional election | 12 May 2024 | —N/a | 55.3 | 28.0; 42 | 13.7; 20 | 21.6; 35 | 8.0; 11 | 5.8; 6 | 4.1; 4 | 0.7; 0 | 11.0; 15 | – | – | – | 3.8; 2 | 0.4; 0 | 6.4 |
| 40dB/Prisa | 12 May 2024 | ? | ? | 29.5; 39/44 | 16.0; 23/25 | 22.2; 34/37 | 7.7; 8/11 | 4.4; 4/5 | 3.9; 2/6 | 0.8; 0 | 9.5; 11/13 | – | – | – | 3.2; 1/5 | – | 7.3 |
| Metroscopia | 12 May 2024 | ? | ? | 28.1; 39/42 | 14.1; 20/23 | 23.1; 36/38 | 7.7; 9/11 | 6.1; 6/9 | 5.2; 7/8 | ? 0 | 8.7; 10/12 | – | – | – | 3.5; 3/5 | – | 5.0 |
| GESOP/Prensa Ibérica | 6–12 May 2024 | 3,000 | ? | 26.0; 37/40 | 14.5; 21/24 | 20.0; 30/33 | 9.0; 11/13 | 6.5; 7/9 | 6.0; 7/9 | ? 0 | 8.5; 10/13 | – | – | – | 4.5; 4/7 | – | 6.0 |
| Feedback/Diari d'Andorra | 6–12 May 2024 | 2,000 | ? | 25.5; 36/39 | 15.8; 22/24 | 21.8; 33/36 | 9.9; 12/13 | 6.2; 5/8 | 4.4; 4/7 | 0.4; 0 | 9.6; 11/12 | – | – | – | 3.9; 3/6 | 0.4; 0 | 3.7 |
| SocioMétrica/El Español | 9–11 May 2024 | 1,200 | ? | 27.9; 39/41 | 15.9; 22/24 | 21.6; 33/36 | 7.6; 10/11 | 5.9; 5/7 | 4.3; 4/6 | 1.4; 0 | 8.9; 11/13 | – | – | – | 3.6; 3/5 | – | 6.3 |
| Feedback/Diari d'Andorra | 7–11 May 2024 | 800 | 64.9 | 25.9; 36/39 | 15.4; 22/24 | 23.2; 34/38 | 9.3; 12 | 4.7; 4/5 | 5.1; 6/7 | 0.9; 0 | 9.0; 11/12 | – | – | – | 4.0; 3/6 | 0.9; 0 | 2.7 |
| Sigma Dos/RTVE–CCMA | 26 Apr–11 May 2024 | 5,930 | ? | 27.1; 37/40 | 17.0; 24/27 | 22.1; 33/36 | 7.2; 10/11 | 6.2; 6/7 | 5.5; 6/8 | 0.5; 0 | 8.1; 9/12 | – | – | – | 3.2; 1/3 | – | 5.0 |
| Feedback/Diari d'Andorra | 6–10 May 2024 | 800 | 64.3 | 26.6; 38/40 | 15.3; 22/24 | 23.5; 35/38 | 9.1; 12 | 4.8; 4/5 | 4.7; 5/7 | 0.9; 0 | 8.7; 11/12 | – | – | – | 3.9; 3/6 | 0.8; 0 | 3.1 |
| GESOP/The Adelaide Review | 2–10 May 2024 | 1,200 | 60–65 | 27.0; 37/40 | 15.0; 22/25 | 20.5; 30/33 | 8.7; 11/13 | 5.7; 5/7 | 6.0; 7/9 | 1.0; 0 | 8.3; 10/13 | – | – | – | 4.0; 3/6 | – | 6.5 |
| Feedback/Diari d'Andorra | 3–9 May 2024 | 800 | 64.4 | 27.3; 39/41 | 15.6; 22/25 | 22.9; 35/38 | 8.5; 11/12 | 5.2; 4/6 | 4.2; 4/6 | 1.0; 0 | 8.6; 11/12 | – | – | – | 3.9; 3/6 | 0.9; 0 | 4.4 |
| GESOP/The Adelaide Review | 2–9 May 2024 | 1,200 | 62–65 | 26.8; 37/40 | 15.8; 23/26 | 21.5; 32/35 | 8.0; 10/12 | 5.2; 5/7 | 6.0; 7/9 | 1.0; 0 | 8.5; 11/13 | – | – | – | 3.4; 3/4 | – | 5.3 |
| GESOP/The Adelaide Review | 2–8 May 2024 | 1,200 | 62–65 | 27.8; 39/42 | 15.0; 21/24 | 22.0; 34/37 | 8.0; 10/12 | 4.8; 4/6 | 6.0; 7/9 | 1.0; 0 | 8.2; 10/12 | – | – | – | 3.4; 3/4 | – | 5.8 |
| Feedback/Diari d'Andorra | 2–8 May 2024 | 800 | 60.7 | 27.8; 39/42 | 16.4; 23/26 | 23.3; 35/38 | 7.7; 9/11 | 5.2; 4/7 | 3.9; 3/6 | 1.0; 0 | 8.1; 10/12 | – | – | – | 3.6; 3/6 | 1.0; 0 | 4.5 |
| GESOP/The Adelaide Review | 2–7 May 2024 | 1,200 | 60–62 | 28.2; 40/42 | 15.0; 22/25 | 22.5; 35/37 | 8.2; 10/12 | 4.8; 4/6 | 6.0; 7/8 | 1.0; 0 | 7.2; 9/11 | – | – | – | 3.0; 1/3 | – | 5.7 |
| Feedback/Diari d'Andorra | 30 Apr–7 May 2024 | 800 | 56.8 | 27.1; 39 | 17.6; 24/28 | 21.3; 33/35 | 8.7; 11/12 | 6.1; 6/9 | 4.0; 4/6 | 0.5; 0 | 9.4; 12/13 | – | – | – | 2.8; 0/3 | 0.7; 0 | 5.8 |
| Sigma Dos/El Mundo | 6 May 2024 | ? | ? | 29.4; 40/42 | 19.1; 26/29 | 21.0; 30/33 | 6.9; 7/9 | 5.7; 5/6 | 5.0; 5/7 | 0.5; 0 | 8.3; 10/12 | – | – | – | 2.7; 1/4 | – | 8.4 |
| KeyData/Público | 6 May 2024 | ? | 63.0 | 28.5; 40 | 17.3; 26 | 21.0; 33 | 7.3; 10 | 5.5; 5 | 4.5; 6 | 0.6; 0 | 9.3; 12/13 | – | – | – | 3.2; 2/3 | – | 7.5 |
| Data10/OKDiario | 5–6 May 2024 | 1,500 | ? | 29.3; 40 | 17.0; 25 | 21.5; 34 | 7.4; 10 | 5.2; 5 | 4.4; 5 | ? 0 | 9.6; 13 | – | – | – | 3.3; 3 | – | 7.8 |
| GESOP/The Adelaide Review | 2–6 May 2024 | 900 | 60–62 | 28.3; 40/42 | 14.0; 20/23 | 22.0; 35/37 | 8.2; 10/12 | 5.0; 4/6 | 5.9; 7/8 | 1.2; 0 | 6.9; 8/11 | – | – | – | 4.0; 4/6 | – | 6.3 |
| Feedback/El Nacional | 29 Apr–6 May 2024 | 800 | 56.7 | 26.9; 39/40 | 17.6; 25/28 | 21.9; 33/36 | 8.4; 11/12 | 6.1; 6/8 | 4.0; 4/6 | 0.9; 0 | 8.7; 11/12 | – | – | – | 2.4; 0/2 | 1.0; 0 | 5.0 |
| EM-Analytics/VilaWeb | 25 Apr–6 May 2024 | 1,200 | ? | 29.8; 41 | 16.6; 25 | 21.5; 34 | 7.9; 11 | 5.3; 5 | 4.2; 4 | 0.8; 0 | 9.5; 12 | – | – | – | 3.3; 3 | 0.6; 0 | 8.3 |
| SocioMétrica/El Español | 1–5 May 2024 | 1,200 | ? | 28.8; 41 | 16.4; 26 | 19.9; 32 | 7.6; 11 | 5.6; 6 | 4.1; 4 | 1.4; 0 | 9.9; 13 | – | – | – | 3.6; 2 | – | 8.9 |
| EM-Analytics/GMG | 28 Apr–5 May 2024 | 1,000 | ? | 29.6; 41 | 17.2; 25 | 21.7; 34 | 7.1; 10 | 5.4; 5 | 4.5; 5 | 0.9; 0 | 9.5; 13 | – | – | – | 3.1; 2 | 0.7; 0 | 7.9 |
| EM-Analytics/VilaWeb | 24 Apr–5 May 2024 | 1,200 | 60 | 29.6; 41 | 17.0; 25 | 21.7; 34 | 7.3; 10 | 5.5; 5 | 4.2; 5 | 0.7; 0 | 9.5; 12 | – | – | – | 3.2; 3 | 0.6; 0 | 7.9 |
| Cluster17/Agenda Pública | 3–4 May 2024 | 1,211 | ? | 29.0; 39/44 | 16.1; 23/26 | 21.2; 32/35 | 7.3; 9/11 | 5.7; 5/7 | 3.9; 2/5 | 1.0; 0 | 9.3; 12/14 | – | – | – | 3.8; 2/5 | 1.0; 0 | 7.8 |
| GESOP/El Periódico | 2–4 May 2024 | 905 | 58–62 | 28.6; 40/42 | 14.2; 21/23 | 22.2; 35/37 | 7.3; 10/11 | 5.2; 4/6 | 5.4; 7/8 | 1.5; 0 | 7.7; 10/11 | – | – | – | 3.4; 3/4 | – | 6.4 |
| EM-Analytics/VilaWeb | 23 Apr–4 May 2024 | 1,200 | ? | 30.5; 42 | 17.2; 25 | 21.0; 33 | 7.0; 9 | 5.3; 5 | 4.7; 6 | 0.7; 0 | 9.4; 13 | – | – | – | 3.0; 2 | 0.6; 0 | 9.5 |
| NC Report/La Razón | 29 Apr–3 May 2024 | 1,000 | 65.8 | 28.4; 39/40 | 17.0; 24/25 | 20.8; 34/35 | 7.3; 10/11 | 5.5; 5/6 | 4.5; 4/5 | ? 0 | 9.9; 13/14 | – | – | – | 3.2; 1/3 | – | 7.6 |
| GAD3/ABC | 25 Apr–3 May 2024 | 1,323 | ? | 30.1; 41/44 | 16.0; 25/26 | 22.1; 34/35 | 8.2; 10/11 | 4.3; 4 | 3.5; 3/4 | ? 0 | 9.2; 12/13 | – | – | – | 3.8; 1/3 | – | 8.0 |
| GAPS/Junts | 25 Apr–3 May 2024 | 844 | ? | 24.6– 26.0; 35/38 | 16.7– 18.2; 26/30 | 22.7– 24.0; 35/38 | 7.5– 8.5; 9/12 | 4.9– 6.2; 5/8 | 4.2– 5.0; 5/8 | ? 0 | 7.2– 8.1; 8/12 | – | – | – | 2.9– 3.8; 2/6 | – | 1.9– 2.0 |
| YouGov/Ara | 23 Apr–3 May 2024 | 3,100 | ? | 27.4; 37/41 | 17.2; 22/26 | 19.5; 30/34 | 8.2; 10/12 | 6.5; 6/9 | 4.7; 5/8 | ? 0 | 8.2; 9/12 | – | – | – | 4.1; 2/7 | – | 7.9 |
| EM-Analytics/VilaWeb | 22 Apr–3 May 2024 | 1,200 | ? | 30.3; 42 | 17.2; 25 | 21.2; 33 | 7.1; 9 | 5.0; 5 | 4.4; 5 | 0.8; 0 | 9.6; 13 | – | – | – | 3.2; 3 | 0.7; 0 | 9.1 |
| Target Point/El Debate | 1–2 May 2024 | 1,006 | ? | 27.1; 38/40 | 18.3; 27/29 | 20.8; 32/34 | 7.5; 10/11 | 4.7; 5 | 4.7; 5 | 1.2; 0 | 9.2; 12/14 | – | – | – | 3.4; 1/3 | – | 6.3 |
| 40dB/Prisa | 30 Apr–2 May 2024 | 1,200 | ? | 28.4; 39/43 | 16.6; 24/26 | 22.0; 34/37 | 7.2; 8/12 | 4.8; 4/5 | 3.7; 2/5 | 1.2; 0 | 9.8; 12/15 | – | – | – | 2.8; 1/3 | – | 6.4 |
| IMOP/El Confidencial | 29 Apr–2 May 2024 | 1,239 | 68 | 27.8; 39/41 | 17.5; 26/28 | 22.4; 36/38 | 5.7; 6/7 | 5.2; 4/5 | 4.1; 4/5 | 1.0; 0 | 8.7; 11/13 | – | – | – | 3.2; 1/3 | – | 5.4 |
| DYM/Henneo | 29 Apr–2 May 2024 | 1,301 | ? | 27.7; 40/42 | 17.2; 24/26 | 20.5; 32/33 | 7.3; 9 | 5.7; 6 | 4.0; 6 | ? 0 | 10.7; 13/14 | – | – | – | 2.9; 1/3 | – | 7.2 |
| Feedback/El Nacional | 29 Apr–2 May 2024 | 600 | 60.9 | 26.4; 39/40 | 17.7; 26/28 | 20.4; 31/33 | 8.4; 11/12 | 6.3; 7/8 | 4.2; 4/7 | ? 0 | 8.9; 11/13 | – | – | – | 2.4; 0/2 | 0.6; 0 | 6.0 |
| Sigma Dos/El Mundo | 25 Apr–2 May 2024 | 3,007 | ? | 29.8; 41/43 | 18.9; 27/30 | 20.1; 28/31 | 6.7; 7/9 | 5.9; 5/6 | 5.3; 6/7 | 0.5; 0 | 8.7; 11/13 | – | – | – | 2.6; 2/4 | – | 9.7 |
| EM-Analytics/VilaWeb | 21 Apr–2 May 2024 | 1,200 | ? | 29.9; 42 | 18.1; 27 | 21.2; 34 | 7.3; 10 | 4.7; 4 | 4.2; 4 | 0.9; 0 | 9.3; 12 | – | – | – | 3.0; 2 | 0.9; 0 | 8.7 |
| SocioMétrica/El Español | 29 Apr–1 May 2024 | 1,150 | ? | 28.4; 42 | 17.2; 26 | 20.1; 32 | 7.5; 11 | 5.7; 6 | 4.1; 4 | ? 0 | 9.7; 13 | – | – | – | 3.2; 1 | – | 8.3 |
| EM-Analytics/VilaWeb | 20 Apr–1 May 2024 | 1,200 | ? | 29.7; 41 | 18.7; 28 | 20.0; 31 | 7.5; 10 | 4.8; 4 | 4.5; 6 | 0.9; 0 | 9.2; 12 | – | – | – | 3.1; 3 | 1.0; 0 | 9.7 |
| CIS | 24–30 Apr 2024 | 4,051 | ? | 29.8– 33.2 | 15.2– 17.9 | 15.4– 18.1 | 5.8– 7.5 | 5.0– 6.7 | 3.2– 4.6 | 0.5– 1.0 | 9.6– 11.9 | – | – | – | 3.0– 4.4 | 0.6– 1.3 | 14.4– 15.1 |
| Celeste-Tel/Onda Cero | 24–30 Apr 2024 | 1,100 | 65.5 | 28.3; 40 | 17.4; 26 | 20.5; 32 | 7.4; 10 | 5.8; 6 | 4.6; 6 | 1.0; 0 | 9.6; 13 | – | – | – | 3.1; 2 | – | 7.8 |
| Hamalgama Métrica/Vozpópuli | 23–30 Apr 2024 | 1,000 | 65.1 | 27.9; 38 | 18.1; 27 | 20.9; 32 | 7.7; 11 | 5.7; 5 | 4.9; 7 | 0.9; 0 | 9.4; 13 | – | – | – | 3.0; 2 | – | 7.0 |
| EM-Analytics/VilaWeb | 19–30 Apr 2024 | 1,200 | ? | 29.1; 40 | 18.4; 27 | 20.4; 32 | 7.4; 10 | 5.2; 5 | 4.9; 7 | 0.9; 0 | 9.2; 12 | – | – | – | 3.0; 2 | 0.8; 0 | 8.7 |
| EM-Analytics/VilaWeb | 18–29 Apr 2024 | 1,200 | ? | 29.6; 41 | 18.1; 27 | 20.5; 33 | 7.2; 10 | 5.3; 5 | 5.2; 7 | 0.9; 0 | 9.1; 12 | – | – | – | 2.8; 0 | 0.7; 0 | 9.1 |
| EM-Analytics/VilaWeb | 17–28 Apr 2024 | 1,200 | ? | 29.4; 41 | 18.3; 28 | 20.8; 32 | 7.6; 11 | 5.1; 5 | 5.4; 7 | 0.7; 0 | 9.0; 11 | – | – | – | 2.5; 0 | 0.7; 0 | 8.6 |
| KeyData/Público | 27 Apr 2024 | ? | 59.5 | 27.2; 38/39 | 18.2; 27/28 | 20.1; 32 | 7.0; 10 | 6.3; 6 | 4.9; 7 | 1.1; 0 | 9.7; 13 | – | – | – | 2.7; 0/2 | – | 7.1 |
| EM-Analytics/VilaWeb | 16–27 Apr 2024 | 1,200 | ? | 28.5; 40 | 18.0; 27 | 21.9; 34 | 7.2; 10 | 5.4; 5 | 5.1; 7 | 0.9; 0 | 9.1; 12 | – | – | – | 2.5; 0 | 0.8; 0 | 6.6 |
| NC Report/La Razón | 22–26 Apr 2024 | 1,000 | 63.9 | 27.3; 38/39 | 17.6; 27/28 | 21.0; 32/33 | 7.4; 11 | 5.9; 6 | 5.1; 6/7 | ? 0 | 9.8; 13/14 | – | – | – | ? 0 | – | 6.3 |
| EM-Analytics/VilaWeb | 15–26 Apr 2024 | 1,200 | ? | 27.6; 38 | 19.0; 28 | 22.1; 34 | 7.4; 11 | 5.2; 5 | 5.4; 7 | 0.9; 0 | 8.8; 12 | – | – | – | 2.2; 0 | 0.9; 0 | 5.5 |
| GAD3/Mediaset | 22–25 Apr 2024 | 1,000 | ? | 29.4; 42/43 | 18.8; 28/29 | 22.4; 35/37 | 6.0; 6/9 | 3.9; 4 | 3.3; 2 | 0.8; 0 | 9.5; 12/13 | – | – | – | 3.4; 2 | 0.4; 0 | 7.0 |
| EM-Analytics/GMG | 11–25 Apr 2024 | 1,000 | ? | 28.2; 39 | 18.3; 28 | 22.2; 34 | 7.7; 11 | 5.3; 5 | 5.2; 7 | 0.9; 0 | 8.9; 11 | – | – | – | 2.2; 0 | 0.7; 0 | 6.0 |
| Feedback/El Nacional | 19–24 Apr 2024 | 700 | 58.9 | 27.0; 39/40 | 16.4; 24/27 | 21.6; 33/36 | 8.0; 11 | 6.3; 7/8 | 4.3; 4/7 | 1.0; 0 | 10.2; 13/14 | – | – | – | 2.3; 0 | 1.2; 0 | 5.4 |
| Target Point/El Debate | 19–23 Apr 2024 | 1,004 | ? | 26.9; 38/39 | 17.8; 27/28 | 21.1; 34/35 | 7.0; 9/10 | 5.9; 6 | 4.8; 5/6 | 1.7; 0 | 9.0; 11/12 | – | – | – | 2.7; 0/2 | – | 5.8 |
| YouGov/Ara | 22 Mar–23 Apr 2024 | 3,500 | ? | 25.6; 34/39 | 17.8; 23/28 | 19.5; 31/34 | 8.3; 10/12 | 6.9; 6/8 | 5.0; 6/8 | 2.0; 0 | 9.2; 11/14 | – | – | – | 3.9; 2/6 | – | 6.1 |
| Cluster17/LLYC | 19–22 Apr 2024 | 1,264 | ? | 27.6; 38/40 | 16.5; 24/26 | 21.4; 32/34 | 7.3; 9/11 | 6.0; 5/6 | 4.7; 5/7 | 0.7; 0 | 9.6; 12/14 | – | – | – | 2.7; 0/3 | 2.0; 0 | 6.2 |
| Opinòmetre/CEO | 11–22 Apr 2024 | 1,500 | ? | 28.0– 33.0; 40/47 | 20.0– 24.0; 31/37 | 18.0– 22.0; 28/34 | 5.0– 7.0; 5/9 | 3.0– 5.0; 3/6 | 4.0– 6.0; 4/8 | 0.0– 1.0; 0 | 6.0– 9.0; 8/12 | – | – | – | 1.0– 3.0; 0/2 | – | 8.0– 9.0 |
| CIS (Logoslab) (Note: Alternative projection based on raw CIS data.) | 11–22 Apr 2024 | 8,905 | ? | 25.5; 36/39 | 17.5; 26/27 | 20.2; 32/33 | 7.9; 10/11 | 6.2; 5/6 | 4.8; 6 | 2.5; 0/3 | 8.9; 12/13 | – | – | – | 3.3; 1/4 | – | 5.3 |
| CIS | 11–22 Apr 2024 | 8,905 | ? | 26.9– 28.3; 39/40 | 17.7– 19.5; 27/28 | 16.3– 18.1; 28/30 | 6.3– 7.5; 8/9 | 5.5– 6.4; 7/8 | 3.7– 4.6; 5/7 | 2.3– 3.1; 0 | 9.2– 10.6; 13/14 | – | – | – | 2.6– 3.4; 0/2 | 0.7– 1.2; 0 | 8.8– 9.2 |
| SocioMétrica/El Español | 16–20 Apr 2024 | 1,200 | ? | 27.5; 40 | 18.1; 27 | 19.6; 32 | 7.9; 11 | 5.8; 6 | 5.0; 5 | ? 0 | 9.9; 13 | – | – | – | 2.8; 1 | – | 7.9 |
| GESOP/El Periódico | 17–19 Apr 2024 | 801 | 55–60 | 26.4; 38/40 | 18.0; 28/30 | 20.4; 32/34 | 6.9; 8/9 | 5.7; 6/7 | 4.0; 4/6 | 1.0; 0 | 9.9; 13/14 | – | – | – | 2.9; 0/1 | 1.8; 0 | 6.0 |
| 40dB/Prisa | 16–19 Apr 2024 | 1,200 | ? | 27.1; 38/40 | 18.2; 26/29 | 21.1; 32/35 | 7.0; 8/11 | 5.9; 5/7 | 5.0; 5/7 | 1.3; 0 | 9.5; 11/13 | – | – | – | 2.1; 0/1 | – | 6.0 |
| Simple Lógica/elDiario.es | 5–17 Apr 2024 | 1,261 | 60.5 | 27.8; 37/39 | 18.9; 27/28 | 21.3; 32/34 | 6.3; 8/9 | 6.7; 7/9 | 4.8; 5 | 1.2; 0 | 9.0; 13/14 | – | – | – | 1.2; 0/3 | – | 6.5 |
| Ipsos/Comuns | 11–15 Apr 2024 | 1,113 | ? | 28.1; 41 | 17.8; 28 | 17.9; 30 | 5.0; 5 | 7.4; 9 | 4.2; 5 | 1.3; 0 | 11.6; 17 | – | – | – | 2.7; 0 | – | 10.2 |
| EM-Analytics/GMG | 26 Mar–10 Apr 2024 | 1,000 | ? | 27.8; 39 | 17.8; 26 | 21.9; 34 | 8.1; 11 | 5.3; 5 | 5.4; 7 | 0.6; 0 | 9.3; 13 | – | – | – | 2.4; 0 | – | 5.9 |
| Infortécnica/Segre | Mar–Apr 2024 | 826 | ? | ? 36/38 | ? 26/27 | ? 35/36 | ? 9/10 | ? 4/6 | ? 6/7 | ? 0/3 | ? 9/10 | – | – | – | ? 0/3 | – | ? |
| Data10/OKDiario | 27–29 Mar 2024 | 1,500 | ? | 26.7; 38 | 20.1; 29 | 21.5; 32 | 7.1; 8 | 6.5; 8 | 4.8; 6 | ? 0 | 10.0; 14 | – | – | – | – | – | 5.2 |
| EM-Analytics/GMG | 1–25 Mar 2024 | 1,000 | ? | 27.4; 38 | 18.9; 28 | 21.2; 33 | 8.2; 11 | 5.3; 5 | 6.1; 8 | 0.5; 0 | 8.8; 12 | – | – | – | 2.2; 0 | – | 6.2 |
| Sigma Dos/El Mundo | 14–22 Mar 2024 | 2,014 | ? | 27.5; 39/41 | 18.4; 27/28 | 17.8; 26/29 | 6.7; 9 | 8.1; 9/10 | 5.9; 7 | 1.6; 0 | 10.0; 13/15 | – | – | – | 1.5; 0 | – | 9.1 |
| Ipsos/La Vanguardia | 16–20 Mar 2024 | 1,425 | ? | 29.4; 41 | 16.8; 26 | 17.7; 29 | 6.4; 8 | 7.7; 9 | 5.4; 7 | 1.8; 0 | 10.8; 15 | – | – | – | – | – | 11.7 |
| SocioMétrica/El Español | 14–16 Mar 2024 | 1,200 | ? | 29.1; 42 | 19.1; 28 | 21.2; 33 | 8.2; 11 | 5.5; 5 | 4.8; 4 | ? 0 | 9.1; 12 | – | (Note: Within ECP.) | – | – | – | 7.9 |
| NC Report/La Razón | 13–16 Mar 2024 | 1,000 | 65.7 | 25.7; 36/37 | 20.5; 30/31 | 21.3; 32/33 | 7.6; 9/10 | 5.5; 6 | 5.3; 7 | 1.0; 0 | 8.9; 12/13 | – | | – | – | – | 4.4 |
| GESOP/El Periódico | 14–15 Mar 2024 | 802 | ? | 23.8; 35/38 | 18.0; 29/32 | 18.5; 29/32 | 6.0; 7/9 | 7.0; 7/9 | 5.9; 7/9 | ? 0 | 10.0; 12/14 | – | 1.7; 0 | – | 2.9; 0/3 | – | 5.3 |
| GESOP/CEO | 9 Feb–7 Mar 2024 | 2,000 | ? | 25.0– 29.0; 35/42 | 17.0– 20.0; 26/32 | 15.0– 18.0; 24/29 | 7.0– 9.0; 9/13 | 7.0– 10.0; 8/13 | 5.0– 7.0; 7/10 | 1.0– 2.0; 0 | 7.0– 10.0; 9/13 | – | | – | – | – | 8.0– 9.0 |
| EM-Analytics/Electomanía | 29 Jan–26 Feb 2024 | 1,550 | ? | 27.4; 39 | 20.1; 30 | 20.9; 33 | 7.8; 11 | 4.8; 5 | 6.2; 8 | 0.5; 0 | 7.8; 9 | – | | – | 1.2; 0 | – | 6.5 |
| EM-Analytics/GMG | 1–21 Feb 2024 | 1,000 | ? | 27.9; 39 | 19.1; 29 | 20.4; 32 | 8.1; 10 | 5.0; 5 | 6.3; 8 | 0.6; 0 | 8.4; 12 | – | | – | 1.6; 0 | – | 7.5 |
| EM-Analytics/GMG | 1–10 Jan 2024 | 1,000 | ? | 28.2; 39 | 21.1; 32 | 18.5; 28 | 8.2; 11 | 5.9; 6 | 5.6; 7 | 0.9; 0 | 8.4; 12 | – | | – | – | – | 7.1 |
| EM-Analytics/GMG | 13–28 Nov 2023 | 1,000 | ? | 28.9; 40 | 20.7; 33 | 18.1; 27 | 8.8; 12 | 6.1; 7 | 5.7; 7 | 1.3; 0 | 7.7; 9 | – | | – | – | – | 8.2 |
| GESOP/CEO | 9 Oct–7 Nov 2023 | 2,000 | ? | 27.0– 31.0; 39/45 | 18.0– 22.0; 29/34 | 12.0– 15.0; 19/24 | 5.0– 7.0; 6/9 | 8.0– 11.0; 10/14 | 4.0– 6.0; 4/8 | 0.0– 1.0; 0 | 9.0– 12.0; 12/17 | – | | – | – | – | 9.0 |
| EM-Analytics/GMG | 25 Sep–10 Oct 2023 | 1,000 | ? | 26.8; 36 | 18.7; 28 | 19.5; 31 | 9.1; 12 | 7.8; 9 | 5.9; 8 | 1.5; 0 | 8.7; 11 | – | | – | – | – | 7.3 |
| Sigma Dos/El Mundo | 7–9 Sep 2023 | 1,000 | ? | 26.1; 36 | 20.3; 31 | 19.6; 31 | 6.2; 7 | 8.4; 10 | 5.2; 7 | ? 0 | 10.3; 13 | – | | – | – | – | 5.8 |
| 2023 general election | 23 Jul 2023 | —N/a | 62.7 | 34.5 (50) | 13.2 (20) | 11.2 (17) | 7.8 (11) | 14.0 (19) | 2.8 (1) | – | 13.4 (17) | 0.9 (0) | | – | – | – | 20.5 |
| GESOP/CEO | 29 May–26 Jun 2023 | 2,000 | ? | 22.0– 26.0; 31/37 | 19.0– 23.0; 31/36 | 15.0– 18.0; 25/30 | 5.0– 8.0; 6/10 | 6.0– 9.0; 7/11 | 6.0– 8.0; 7/11 | 1.0– 2.0; 0 | 10.0– 12.0; 13/17 | – | | – | – | – | 3.0 |
| GESOP/CEO | 27 Feb–24 Mar 2023 | 2,000 | ? | 23.0– 27.0; 34/40 | 18.0– 22.0; 29/34 | 14.0– 17.0; 22/28 | 6.0– 8.0; 7/10 | 6.0– 9.0; 7/12 | 6.0– 8.0; 8/12 | 3.0– 5.0; 0/5 | 7.0– 9.0; 8/12 | – | | – | – | – | 5.0 |
| EM-Analytics/GMG | 12 Oct–10 Dec 2022 | 12,003 | ? | 22.2; 32 | 23.1; 36 | 15.7; 24 | 8.8; 12 | 7.8; 10 | 7.6; 10 | 2.3; 0 | 6.6; 8 | – | | 3.1; 3 | – | – | 0.9 |
| GESOP/CEO | 27 Sep–21 Oct 2022 | 2,000 | ? | 23.0– 27.0; 35/41 | 18.0– 22.0; 30/36 | 12.0– 15.0; 19/24 | 5.0– 7.0; 6/10 | 6.0– 8.0; 6/10 | 6.0– 8.0; 8/12 | 2.0– 4.0; 0/4 | 8.0– 11.0; 11/16 | – | | – | – | – | 5.0 |
| GESOP/El Periódico | 13–14 Oct 2022 | 803 | ? | 24.8; 37/38 | 20.1; 32/33 | 18.6; 29/30 | 6.4; 8/9 | 6.3; 7/8 | 7.5; 10/11 | 2.0; 0 | 7.1; 9/10 | – | | – | – | – | 4.7 |
| EM-Analytics/Electomanía | 31 Aug–13 Oct 2022 | 1,540 | ? | 21.6; 31 | 22.4; 35 | 16.5; 25 | 8.6; 12 | 7.6; 9 | 7.5; 10 | 2.4; 0 | 6.6; 8 | – | | 3.6; 5 | – | – | 0.8 |
| GESOP/CEO | 7 Jun–7 Jul 2022 | 2,000 | ? | 25.0– 29.0; 36/42 | 19.0– 23.0; 31/37 | 14.0– 17.0; 22/27 | 4.0– 6.0; 4/8 | 4.0– 6.0; 4/7 | 6.0– 8.0; 8/12 | 4.0– 6.0; 3/6 | 7.0– 10.0; 9/14 | – | | – | – | – | 6.0 |
| EM-Analytics/Electomanía | 15 Apr–30 May 2022 | 1,565 | ? | 21.9; 31 | 23.2; 38 | 16.6; 26 | 9.2; 12 | 7.3; 8 | 7.5; 10 | 2.7; 0 | 6.0; 7 | – | | 2.5; 3 | – | – | 1.3 |
| Feedback/El Nacional | 10–19 May 2022 | 1,000 | 59.3 | 23.3; 33/35 | 21.1; 31/34 | 16.3; 25/26 | 8.4; 11/12 | 8.7; 10/11 | 6.7; 8/10 | 3.8; 3/4 | 5.4; 6/7 | 1.8; 0 | | – | – | – | 2.2 |
| Ipsos/La Vanguardia | 9–12 May 2022 | ? | 51 | 25.2; 36 | 20.8; 33 | 15.7; 25 | 9.3; 12 | 7.6; 9 | 7.8; 10 | 3.5; 3 | 5.8; 7 | 1.5; 0 | | – | – | – | 4.4 |
| GESOP/CEO | 1–28 Mar 2022 | 2,000 | ? | 23.0– 29.0; 34/39 | 20.0– 25.0; 33/38 | 13.0– 18.0; 23/28 | 6.0– 10.0; 9/12 | 6.0– 9.0; 6/10 | 6.0– 9.0; 8/11 | 2.0– 5.0; 0/4 | 4.0– 8.0; 6/8 | – | | – | – | – | 3.0– 4.0 |
| EM-Analytics/Electomanía | 30 Aug–14 Oct 2021 | 4,146 | ? | 24.7; 35 | 24.6; 38 | 18.0; 27 | 7.2; 10 | 6.5; 7 | 6.9; 10 | 2.6; 0 | 6.3; 8 | – | | – | – | – | 0.1 |
| GAD3/La Vanguardia | 20–22 Sep 2021 | 806 | 62.0 | 24.1; 33/34 | 25.9; 39/40 | 17.3; 27 | 6.9; 8/10 | 8.1; 10 | 4.6; 6/7 | 3.8; 3 | 5.9; 6/7 | 0.6; 0 | | – | – | – | 1.8 |
| EM-Analytics/Electomanía | 31 May–13 Jul 2021 | 3,458 | ? | 24.7; 36 | 23.4; 35 | 19.5; 31 | 7.1; 8 | 6.3; 7 | 7.4; 10 | 2.2; 0 | 6.7; 8 | – | | – | – | – | 1.3 |
| Opinòmetre/CEO | 11–19 May 2021 | 1,200 | 60 | 23.8; 34/35 | 24.0; 36/37 | 18.0; 28/29 | 6.2; 7/8 | 6.6; 8/9 | 8.3; 11/12 | 2.4; 0/2 | 6.4; 6/7 | – | | – | – | – | 0.2 |
| GESOP/El Periódico | 12–14 May 2021 | 801 | ? | 26.2; 37/38 | 22.5; 34/36 | 17.0; 25/27 | 7.7; 10/11 | 6.9; 8/9 | 7.5; 9/10 | 4.0; 3/4 | 4.9; 5/6 | 1.3; 0 | | – | – | – | 3.7 |
| GAD3/La Vanguardia | 11–12 May 2021 | 800 | 56.0 | 25.4; 36 | 22.2; 35 | 20.8; 33 | 6.3; 8 | 6.4; 7 | 6.2; 8 | 2.3; 0 | 7.0; 8 | 0.8; 0 | | – | – | – | 3.2 |
| NC Report/La Razón | 30 Mar–1 Apr 2021 | 1,000 | 50.4 | 23.5; 34 | 22.4; 34 | 19.2; 31 | 8.1; 12 | 6.7; 8 | 6.9; 9 | 3.1; 2 | 5.4; 5 | – | | – | – | – | 1.1 |
| 2021 regional election | 14 Feb 2021 | —N/a | 51.3 | 23.0; 33 | 21.3; 33 | 20.1; 32 | 7.7; 11 | 6.9; 8 | 6.7; 9 | 5.6; 6 | 3.8; 3 | 2.7; 0 | | – | – | – | 1.7 |

=== Voting preferences ===
The table below lists raw, unweighted voting preferences.

| Polling firm/Commissioner | Fieldwork date | Sample size | PSC | ERC | Junts | Vox | ECP | CUP | Cs | PP | PDeCAT | Podem | Aliança.cat | Question | X mark | Lead |
|---|---|---|---|---|---|---|---|---|---|---|---|---|---|---|---|---|
| 2024 regional election (Note: Does not include non-resident citizens.) | 12 May 2024 | —N/a | 16.1 | 7.9 | 12.4 | 4.6 | 3.3 | 2.4 | 0.4 | 6.3 | – | – | 2.2 | —N/a | 42.1 | 3.7 |
| GESOP/El Periódico | 2–4 May 2024 | 905 | 20.8 | 10.4 | 16.0 | 3.1 | 4.7 | 4.9 | 1.0 | 4.6 | – | – | 2.4 | 17.3 | 8.2 | 4.8 |
| 40dB/Prisa | 30 Apr–2 May 2024 | 1,200 | 19.2 | 9.9 | 17.1 | 6.2 | 4.2 | 3.2 | 1.8 | 5.6 | – | – | 3.3 | 17.7 | 7.2 | 2.1 |
| DYM/Henneo | 29 Apr–2 May 2024 | 1,301 | 18.6 | 12.5 | 12.7 | 5.1 | 6.2 | 2.8 | – | 4.5 | – | – | 2.1 | 18.8 | 11.4 | 5.9 |
| CIS | 24–30 Apr 2024 | 4,051 | 21.9 | 10.6 | 10.7 | 4.2 | 2.6 | 3.2 | 0.3 | 7.0 | – | – | 2.5 | 29.7 | 4.2 | 11.2 |
| Opinòmetre/CEO | 11–22 Apr 2024 | 1,500 | 13.0 | 13.0 | 8.2 | 2.2 | 2.9 | 2.1 | 0.3 | 1.9 | – | – | 1.5 | 47.1 | 5.0 | Tie |
| CIS | 11–22 Apr 2024 | 8,905 | 20.9 | 14.5 | 12.5 | 5.4 | 5.5 | 3.2 | 1.8 | 7.7 | – | – | 2.4 | 19.4 | 3.2 | 6.4 |
| GESOP/El Periódico | 17–19 Apr 2024 | 801 | 21.0 | 14.4 | 13.4 | 2.5 | 4.9 | 2.7 | 0.5 | 4.6 | – | – | 1.7 | 19.1 | 9.8 | 6.6 |
| 40dB/Prisa | 16–19 Apr 2024 | 1,200 | 17.0 | 11.5 | 15.3 | 4.8 | 6.5 | 3.3 | 1.9 | 7.0 | – | – | 3.3 | 18.1 | 5.9 | 1.7 |
| GESOP/El Periódico | 14–15 Mar 2024 | 802 | 14.7 | 12.9 | 9.4 | 2.3 | 5.4 | 3.9 | 0.5 | 4.1 | – | 1.3 | 1.5 | 27.7 | 9.9 | 1.8 |
| GESOP/CEO | 9 Feb–7 Mar 2024 | 2,000 | 19.0 | 17.1 | 11.3 | 4.3 | 6.8 | 4.5 | 0.8 | 5.4 | 0.4 | | – | 14.0 | 7.3 | 1.9 |
| GESOP/ICPS | 31 Oct–20 Nov 2023 | 1,200 | 16.4 | 19.7 | 15.6 | 2.1 | 5.8 | 4.2 | 0.6 | 4.0 | – | | – | 17.2 | 10.4 | 3.3 |
| GESOP/CEO | 9 Oct–7 Nov 2023 | 2,000 | 21.2 | 18.4 | 11.1 | 4.0 | 7.8 | 4.0 | 0.7 | 5.8 | 0.6 | | – | 12.2 | 7.6 | 2.8 |
| 2023 general election | 23 Jul 2023 | —N/a | 22.4 | 8.5 | 7.2 | 5.0 | 9.1 | 1.8 | – | 8.7 | 0.6 | | – | —N/a | 34.6 | 13.3 |
| GESOP/CEO | 29 May–26 Jun 2023 | 2,000 | 19.6 | 16.8 | 12.5 | 4.0 | 7.3 | 6.0 | 1.5 | 6.0 | – | | – | 12.2 | 6.6 | 2.8 |
| GESOP/CEO | 27 Feb–24 Mar 2023 | 2,000 | 18.1 | 18.9 | 8.2 | 2.7 | 7.4 | 5.3 | 2.0 | 4.4 | 0.8 | | – | 15.9 | 6.9 | 0.8 |
| GESOP/ICPS | 19 Oct–11 Nov 2022 | 1,200 | 16.6 | 18.3 | 8.3 | 2.0 | 5.8 | 4.2 | 2.3 | 4.0 | – | | – | 18.3 | 12.6 | 1.7 |
| GESOP/CEO | 27 Sep–21 Oct 2022 | 2,000 | 16.7 | 17.6 | 8.6 | 3.6 | 6.8 | 6.1 | 2.1 | 4.1 | 0.9 | | – | 14.7 | 9.2 | 0.9 |
| GESOP/El Periódico | 13–14 Oct 2022 | 803 | 17.8 | 19.7 | 10.6 | 1.8 | 6.1 | 5.9 | 1.1 | 2.7 | – | | – | 15.9 | 8.9 | 1.9 |
| GESOP/CEO | 7 Jun–7 Jul 2022 | 2,000 | 17.8 | 19.4 | 10.1 | 2.6 | 6.3 | 6.2 | 2.8 | 5.0 | 0.5 | | – | 12.1 | 8.0 | 1.6 |
| GESOP/CEO | 1–28 Mar 2022 | 2,000 | 11.4 | 17.5 | 6.6 | 2.1 | 4.5 | 4.9 | 0.9 | 1.8 | 0.2 | | – | 29.7 | 11.7 | 6.1 |
| GESOP/ICPS | 4–29 Oct 2021 | 1,200 | 14.3 | 19.6 | 10.5 | 2.8 | 4.4 | 7.1 | 3.0 | 2.8 | 0.5 | | – | 16.7 | 12.3 | 5.3 |
| GAD3/La Vanguardia | 20–22 Sep 2021 | 806 | 17.6 | 18.3 | 8.8 | 3.9 | 5.1 | 2.9 | 2.7 | 3.5 | – | | – | 35.4 | | 0.7 |
| Opinòmetre/CEO | 11–19 May 2021 | 1,200 | 12.9 | 15.9 | 8.6 | 1.9 | 4.9 | 6.0 | 1.0 | 3.1 | – | | – | 27.4 | 11.6 | 3.0 |
| GESOP/El Periódico | 12–14 May 2021 | 801 | 19.0 | 17.8 | 10.2 | 2.2 | 5.7 | 5.9 | 1.9 | 1.5 | 0.4 | | – | 10.8 | 19.1 | 1.2 |
| GAD3/La Vanguardia | 11–12 May 2021 | 800 | 18.5 | 15.7 | 10.3 | 4.1 | 4.2 | 3.6 | 1.8 | 4.5 | – | | – | 35.5 | | 2.8 |
| 2021 regional election | 14 Feb 2021 | —N/a | 12.2 | 11.2 | 10.6 | 4.1 | 3.6 | 3.5 | 2.9 | 2.0 | 1.4 | | – | —N/a | 46.5 | 1.0 |

=== Victory preferences ===
The table below lists opinion polling on the victory preferences for each party in the event of a regional election taking place.

| Polling firm/Commissioner | Fieldwork date | Sample size | PSC | ERC | Junts | Vox | Comuns Sumar | CUP | Cs | PP | Aliança.cat | Other/ None | Question | Lead |
|---|---|---|---|---|---|---|---|---|---|---|---|---|---|---|
| CIS | 24–30 Apr 2024 | 4,051 | 27.1 | 14.4 | 13.9 | 4.6 | 4.3 | 2.7 | – | 8.0 | 2.3 | 6.5 | 16.2 | 12.7 |
| CIS | 11–22 Apr 2024 | 8,905 | 25.1 | 17.2 | 15.7 | 5.9 | 5.5 | 3.0 | 2.3 | 8.3 | 2.1 | 5.3 | 9.5 | 7.9 |
| Ipsos/La Vanguardia | 16–20 Mar 2024 | 1,425 | 25.0 | 16.0 | 14.0 | 5.0 | 3.0 | 4.0 | 2.0 | 9.0 | – | 22.0 | | 9.0 |

=== Victory likelihood ===
The table below lists opinion polling on the perceived likelihood of victory for each party in the event of a regional election taking place.

| Polling firm/Commissioner | Fieldwork date | Sample size | PSC | ERC | Junts | Vox | Comuns Sumar | CUP | Cs | PP | Other/ None | Question | Lead |
|---|---|---|---|---|---|---|---|---|---|---|---|---|---|
| GESOP/El Periódico | 2–4 May 2024 | 905 | 58.5 | 11.4 | 9.7 | – | – | – | – | – | 1.5 | 18.9 | 47.1 |
| GAD3/Mediaset | 22–25 Apr 2024 | 1,000 | 46.0 | 14.0 | 16.0 | 1.0 | 0.2 | 0.4 | – | 2.0 | 0.5 | 20.0 | 30.0 |
| CIS | 11–22 Apr 2024 | 8,905 | 45.9 | 18.0 | 16.0 | 0.9 | – | – | 0.6 | 2.0 | 1.3 | 15.4 | 27.9 |
| GESOP/El Periódico | 17–19 Apr 2024 | 801 | 45.7 | 13.7 | 14.2 | 0.4 | 0.3 | 0.3 | – | 1.2 | – | 24.4 | 31.5 |
| GESOP/El Periódico | 14–15 Mar 2024 | 802 | 36.4 | 18.5 | 14.7 | 0.2 | 0.2 | 0.3 | – | 1.2 | 0.1 | 28.3 | 17.9 |

=== Preferred President ===
The table below lists opinion polling on leader preferences to become president of the Government of Catalonia.

| Polling firm/Commissioner | Fieldwork date | Sample size | | | | | | | | | | | | | | Other/ None/ Not care | Question | Lead |
| Polling firm/Commissioner | Fieldwork date | Sample size | Illa PSC | Aragonès ERC | Junqueras ERC | Puigdem. Junts | Borràs Junts | Garriga Vox | Albiach CatComú | Sabater CUP | Estrada CUP | Carrizosa Cs | Fernández PP | Chacón PDeCAT | Orriols AC | Other/ None/ Not care | Question | Lead |
|---|---|---|---|---|---|---|---|---|---|---|---|---|---|---|---|---|---|---|
| SocioMétrica/El Español | 1–5 May 2024 | 1,200 | 19.4 | 8.5 | – | 14.3 | – | 4.4 | 5.6 | – | 2.4 | 2.7 | 4.5 | – | 2.7 | 35.5 | | 5.1 |
| GESOP/El Periódico | 2–4 May 2024 | 905 | 20.5 | 10.2 | – | 18.6 | – | – | – | – | – | – | – | – | – | 17.3 | 18.5 | 1.9 |
| GAD3/ABC | 25 Apr–3 May 2024 | 1,323 | 25.1 | 13.4 | – | 14.6 | – | 3.5 | 1.6 | – | 1.3 | 0.2 | 5.8 | – | 1.9 | 21.4 | 11.2 | 10.5 |
| 40dB/Prisa | 30 Apr–2 May 2024 | 1,200 | 21.0 | 10.4 | – | 21.5 | – | 5.4 | 5.7 | – | 2.5 | 2.1 | 4.9 | – | 3.4 | 14.4 | 8.8 | 0.5 |
| IMOP/El Confidencial | 29 Apr–2 May 2024 | 1,239 | 19.8 | 12.9 | – | 20.6 | – | – | – | – | – | – | – | – | – | – | – | 0.8 |
| DYM/Henneo | 29 Apr–2 May 2024 | 1,301 | 30.3 | 17.5 | – | 21.6 | – | – | – | – | – | – | – | – | – | – | – | 8.7 |
| CIS | 24–30 Apr 2024 | 4,051 | 27.3 | 12.8 | – | 16.9 | – | 4.1 | 4.2 | – | 2.1 | 0.7 | 6.6 | – | 2.6 | 8.4 | 14.3 | 10.4 |
| EM-Analytics/GMG | 11–25 Apr 2024 | 1,000 | 28.0 | 13.9 | – | 23.8 | – | 3.1 | 2.6 | – | 2.6 | 0.5 | 5.3 | – | 2.5 | 17.9 | – | 4.2 |
| CIS | 11–22 Apr 2024 | 8,905 | 24.8 | 14.6 | – | 17.0 | – | 4.7 | 4.5 | – | 2.1 | 2.3 | 7.0 | – | 2.0 | 9.6 | 11.4 | 7.8 |
| SocioMétrica/El Español | 16–20 Apr 2024 | 1,200 | 19.3 | 8.8 | – | 13.9 | – | 4.8 | 5.8 | – | 2.3 | 2.2 | 5.2 | – | 1.8 | 35.9 | | 5.4 |
| GESOP/El Periódico | 17–19 Apr 2024 | 801 | 20.4 | 14.5 | – | 18.6 | – | 1.7 | 4.4 | – | 1.6 | 0.9 | 2.0 | – | 1.5 | 20.2 | 14.7 | 1.8 |
| 40dB/Prisa | 16–19 Apr 2024 | 1,200 | 19.5 | 9.9 | – | 19.5 | – | 5.5 | 7.2 | – | 2.2 | 2.4 | 6.1 | – | 4.4 | 14.0 | 9.4 | Tie |
| EM-Analytics/GMG | 1–25 Mar 2024 | 1,000 | 34.3 | 14.8 | – | 28.4 | – | 2.3 | 0.8 | 1.0 | – | 1.2 | 1.7 | – | 1.7 | 13.4 | – | 5.9 |
| Ipsos/La Vanguardia | 16–20 Mar 2024 | 1,425 | 23.0 | 9.0 | – | 13.0 | – | 0.0 | 2.0 | – | 1.0 | 1.0 | 3.0 | – | – | 48.0 | | 10.0 |
| SocioMétrica/El Español | 14–16 Mar 2024 | 1,200 | 23.3 | 15.3 | – | 12.9 | – | 6.8 | 4.4 | 3.6 | – | 2.2 | 8.4 | – | – | 23.1 | | 8.0 |
| GESOP/El Periódico | 14–15 Mar 2024 | 802 | 18.1 | 16.3 | – | 21.0 | – | 1.6 | 6.4 | – | 3.9 | 1.7 | 3.0 | – | – | 13.8 | 11.2 | 2.9 |
| GESOP/ICPS | 31 Oct–20 Nov 2023 | 1,200 | 11.7 | 7.3 | 12.8 | 16.7 | – | 0.7 | 1.3 | 0.8 | – | 0.3 | 1.1 | – | – | 8.6 | 39.0 | 3.9 |
| GESOP/ICPS | 19 Oct–11 Nov 2022 | 1,200 | 18.4 | 17.8 | – | – | 7.8 | 1.7 | 3.5 | 4.1 | – | 0.9 | 1.3 | – | – | 27.1 | 17.5 | 0.6 |
| GESOP/El Periódico | 13–14 Oct 2022 | 803 | 19.1 | 21.7 | – | – | 10.9 | 0.9 | 3.7 | 3.6 | – | 1.0 | 1.3 | – | – | 25.0 | 13.0 | 2.6 |
| GESOP/El Periódico | 12–14 May 2021 | 801 | 21.7 | 18.4 | – | 15.5 | – | 0.9 | 4.3 | 2.6 | – | 0.4 | 1.4 | 2.1 | – | 19.0 | 13.7 | 3.3 |

== Voter turnout ==
The table below shows registered voter turnout during the election. Figures for election day do not include non-resident citizens, while final figures do.

| Province | Time (Election day) | | | | | | | | | Final | | |
| Province | 13:00 | | | 18:00 | | | 20:00 | | | Final | | |
| Province | 2021 | 2024 | +/– | 2021 | 2024 | +/– | 2021 | 2024 | +/– | 2021 | 2024 | +/– |
|---|---|---|---|---|---|---|---|---|---|---|---|---|
| Barcelona | 22.48% | 26.99% | +4.51 | 45.81% | 46.22% | +0.41 | 53.73% | 58.47% | +4.74 | 51.40% | 55.72% | +4.32 |
| Girona | 24.30% | 27.35% | +3.05 | 46.99% | 45.82% | −1.17 | 54.75% | 57.18% | +2.43 | 52.75% | 54.92% | +2.17 |
| Lleida | 24.14% | 25.39% | +1.25 | 45.95% | 43.37% | −2.58 | 54.70% | 56.42% | +1.72 | 51.92% | 53.54% | +1.62 |
| Tarragona | 22.68% | 26.67% | +3.99 | 42.77% | 44.08% | +1.31 | 50.37% | 55.47% | +5.10 | 48.86% | 53.72% | +4.86 |
| Total | 22.77% | 26.90% | +4.13 | 45.61% | 45.80% | +0.19 | 53.53% | 57.92% | +4.39 | 51.29% | 55.31% | +4.02 |

== Results ==
=== Overall ===
← Summary of the 12 May 2024 Parliament of Catalonia election results →
| Parties and alliances | Popular vote | | | Seats | |
| Parties and alliances | Votes | % | ±pp | Total | +/− |
|---|---|---|---|---|---|
| Socialists' Party of Catalonia (PSC–PSOE) | 882,589 | 27.96 | +4.93 | 42 | +9 |
| Together+Carles Puigdemont for Catalonia (Cat–Junts+) | 681,470 | 21.59 | +1.52 | 35 | +3 |
| Republican Left of Catalonia (ERC) | 431,128 | 13.66 | −7.64 | 20 | −13 |
| People's Party (PP) | 347,170 | 11.00 | +7.15 | 15 | +12 |
| Vox (Vox) | 251,096 | 7.95 | +0.28 | 11 | ±0 |
| Commons Unite (Comuns Sumar)^{1} | 184,297 | 5.84 | −1.03 | 6 | −2 |
| Popular Unity Candidacy–Let's Defend the Land (CUP–DT) | 129,059 | 4.09 | −2.59 | 4 | −5 |
| Catalan Alliance (Aliança.cat) | 119,149 | 3.77 | New | 2 | +2 |
| Animalist Party with the Environment (PACMA) | 34,493 | 1.09 | New | 0 | ±0 |
| Citizens–Party of the Citizenry (Cs) | 22,947 | 0.73 | −4.85 | 0 | −6 |
| At the Same Time (Alhora)^{2} | 14,104 | 0.45 | +0.24 | 0 | ±0 |
| Workers' Front (FO) | 10,118 | 0.32 | New | 0 | ±0 |
| Communist Party of the Workers of Catalonia (PCTC) | 4,212 | 0.13 | −0.03 | 0 | ±0 |
| Zero Cuts (Recortes Cero) | 3,487 | 0.11 | −0.34 | 0 | ±0 |
| For a Fairer World (PUM+J) | 2,760 | 0.09 | +0.04 | 0 | ±0 |
| Left for Spain (IZQP–Unidos–DEf)^{3} | 1,892 | 0.06 | −0.03 | 0 | ±0 |
| National Front of Catalonia (FNC) | 269 | 0.01 | −0.17 | 0 | ±0 |
| Convergents (CNV) | 263 | 0.01 | New | 0 | ±0 |
| Blank ballots | 35,967 | 1.14 | +0.29 | | |
| Total | 3,156,470 | | | 135 | ±0 |
| Valid votes | 3,156,470 | 99.16 | +0.60 | | |
| Invalid votes | 26,667 | 0.84 | −0.60 | | |
| Votes cast / turnout | 3,183,137 | 55.31 | +4.02 | | |
| Abstentions | 2,571,815 | 44.69 | −4.02 | | |
| Registered voters | 5,754,952 | | | | |
Sources
Footnotes: ^{1} Commons Unite results are compared to In Common We Can–We Can In Common totals in the 2021 election.; ^{2} At the Same Time results are compared to Primaries for the Independence of Catalonia Movement totals in the 2021 election.; ^{3} Left for Spain results are compared to the combined totals of Left in Positive and United for Democracy+Retirees in the 2021 election.

Popular vote
| PSC–PSOE | 27.96% |
| Cat–Junts+ | 21.59% |
| ERC | 13.66% |
| PP | 11.00% |
| Vox | 7.95% |
| Comuns Sumar | 5.84% |
| CUP–DT | 4.09% |
| Aliança.cat | 3.77% |
| PACMA | 1.09% |
| Others | 1.90% |
| Blank ballots | 1.14% |

Seats
| PSC–PSOE | 31.11% |
| Cat–Junts+ | 25.93% |
| ERC | 14.81% |
| PP | 11.11% |
| Vox | 8.15% |
| Comuns Sumar | 4.44% |
| CUP–DT | 2.96% |
| Aliança.cat | 1.48% |

=== Distribution by constituency ===
| Constituency | PSC | | Junts+ | | ERC | | PP | | Vox | | Comuns | | CUP–DT | | Aliança | |
| Constituency | % | S | % | S | % | S | % | S | % | S | % | S | % | S | % | S |
|---|---|---|---|---|---|---|---|---|---|---|---|---|---|---|---|---|
| Barcelona | 29.9 | 28 | 19.3 | 18 | 13.4 | 12 | 11.6 | 11 | 8.0 | 7 | 6.7 | 6 | 4.0 | 3 | 2.9 | − |
| Girona | 19.6 | 4 | 34.8 | 7 | 12.0 | 2 | 6.6 | 1 | 6.4 | 1 | 3.3 | − | 4.9 | 1 | 9.0 | 1 |
| Lleida | 20.6 | 4 | 30.3 | 5 | 16.3 | 3 | 9.2 | 1 | 6.2 | 1 | 2.2 | − | 4.2 | − | 7.8 | 1 |
| Tarragona | 25.5 | 6 | 21.2 | 5 | 16.0 | 3 | 11.8 | 2 | 10.2 | 2 | 3.9 | − | 4.0 | − | 3.5 | − |
| Total | 28.0 | 42 | 21.6 | 35 | 13.7 | 20 | 11.0 | 15 | 8.0 | 11 | 5.8 | 6 | 4.1 | 4 | 3.8 | 2 |

== Aftermath ==
=== Government formation ===
Following the release of the election results, Salvador Illa said that "Catalonia has decided to open a new era". He was also congratulated by Pedro Sánchez for the "historic result". Carles Puigdemont observed that his party was the "only pro-independence force to increase in votes and seats" but acknowledged the offset suffered by other separatist parties. He also ruled out joining a coalition that included the PSC and suggested that Junts would try and restore their previous coalition with ERC, despite the fact that such a coalition would fall well short of enough seats to form a government and in defiance of his pre-election pledge to retire from politics if he lost the election. On 13 May, Pere Aragonès announced his retirement from politics and ruled out ERC joining a coalition with Junts or the PSC, while the latter said that it was seeking to form a coalition with the support of ERC and Comuns Sumar and ruled out a Puigdemont-led government.

On 29 July, ERC announced that it had reached an agreement to elect Illa as new regional president in exchange for executive powers to the Catalan government for collecting, managing and inspecting taxes. The agreement was validated by ERC's membership by 53% in favour to 44% against, as well as by the Republican Youth of Catalonia (JERC). On 31 July, the Comuns also reached an agreement with the PSC to support Illa's investiture, thus ensuring enough votes for an election in the first round of voting.

Investiture; Nomination of Salvador Illa (PSC)
| Ballot → | 8 August 2024 |
| Required majority → | 68 out of 135 |
| Yes: • PSC (42); • ERC (20); • Comuns Sumar (6) | 68 / 135 |
| No: • Junts (34); • PP (15); • Vox (11); • CUP–DT (4); • Aliança.cat (2) | 66 / 135 |
| Abstentions | 0 / 135 |
| Absentees: • Junts (1) | 1 / 135 |

== Bibliography ==
- Ley Orgánica 4/1979, de 18 de diciembre, de Estatuto de Autonomía de Cataluña (Organic Law 4/1979). Official State Gazette (in Spanish). 18 December 1979. BOE-A-1979-30178.
- Ley Orgánica 5/1985, de 19 de junio, del Régimen Electoral General (Organic Law 5/1985). Official State Gazette (in Spanish). 19 June 1985 [version as of 2 February 2024]. BOE-A-1985-11672.
- Ley Orgánica 6/2006, de 19 de julio, de reforma del Estatuto de Autonomía de Cataluña (Organic Law 6/2006). Official State Gazette (in Spanish). 19 July 2006 [version as of 28 December 2022]. BOE-A-2006-13087.
- Ley 13/2008, de 5 de noviembre, de la presidencia de la Generalidad y del Gobierno (Law 13/2008). Official State Gazette (in Spanish). 5 November 2008 [version as of 25 April 2019]. BOE-A-2008-19526.
- Decreto 60/2024, de 18 de marzo, de convocatoria de elecciones al Parlamento de Cataluña y de su disolución (PDF) (Decree 60/2024). Official Journal of the Government of Catalonia (in Spanish). 18 March 2024. DOGC-B-24078099-2024.
