= Alejandro Fernández (politician) =

Spanish politician and political scientist

Alejandro Fernández MP
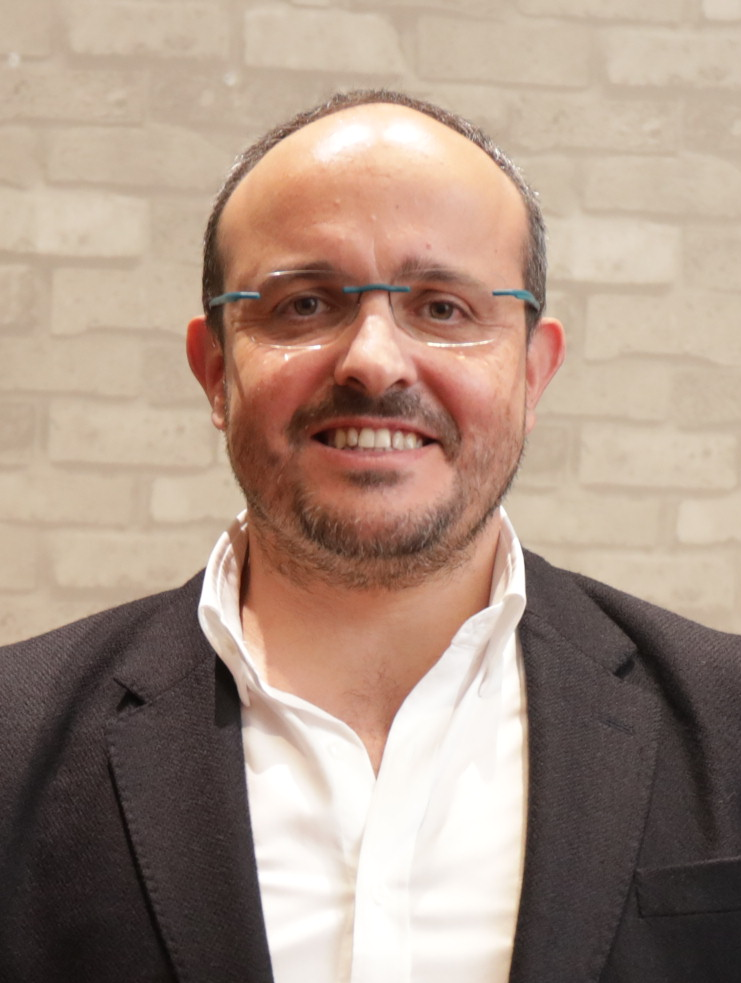
- Alejandro Fernández in 2018

President of the People's Party of Catalonia
- Incumbent
- Assumed office 10 November 2018
- Preceded by: Xavier García Albiol

Member of the Parliament of Catalonia
- Incumbent
- Assumed office 26 October 2015
- Constituency: Tarragona (2015–2021); Barcelona (since 2021)

Member of the Congress of Deputies
- In office 5 December 2011 – 26 October 2015
- Constituency: Tarragona

Member of the Tarragona City Council
- In office 14 June 2003 – 28 November 2016

Personal details
- Born: Alejandro Fernández Álvarez; 30 May 1976 (age 50) Tarragona, Catalonia, Spain
- Party: People's Party of Catalonia (1994–present)
- Education: Autonomous University of Barcelona
- Occupation: Political scientist • Politician

Alejandro Fernández Álvarez (born 30 May 1976) is a Spanish politician and political scientist who has been the leader of the People's Party of Catalonia since 2018. He has been a deputy in the Parliament of Catalonia since 2015, having previously been in the Congress of Deputies since 2011.

== Early life ==
Born in Tarragona to a lorry driver father and domestic worker mother, Fernández graduated in Political Science and Administration at the Autonomous University of Barcelona. He was a professor at Rovira i Virgili University in Tarragona, and in 2013 campaigned for it to be renamed "Tarragona University" instead of after the Catalan republican Antoni Rovira i Virgili.

== Political career ==
He joined the youth division of the People's Party at 14 and was a city councillor in Tarragona for 13 years from 2003, leading the party in the city from 2008. In 2011 he was elected to the Congress of Deputies, leaving in 2015 when elected to the Parliament of Catalonia.

During his 2011 mayoral campaign, Fernández recorded a jingle to the tune of Lady Gaga's "Alejandro". It was withdrawn after legal threats from Sony/ATV Music Publishing.

In November 2018, he succeeded Xavier García Albiol as party leader upon the latter's resignation, with 97.1% of the votes.

In his campaign for the 2021 Catalan election, Fernández proposed ending Catalonia's separate police and judicial system, ending the region's public-private diplomacy consortium DiploCat ("partisan propaganda with public money"), and ensuring neutrality of TV3, Catalunya Ràdio and universities. Running in the Barcelona constituency instead of his native Tarragona, he saw his party's seats fall by one to three; this was their worst result for the Parliament of Catalonia and made them the smallest party within.

Fernández remained his party's lead candidate for the 2024 Catalan regional election, more than tripling their votes and quintupling their seats to 15. The PP overtook Vox as the biggest party on the anti-independence right, coming second overall in several major cities and third in Barcelona.
