= Jordi Riba =

Spanish politician (born 1975)

Member of the Parliament of Catalonia
- Incumbent
- Assumed office 12 March 2021
- Constituency: Barcelona

Personal details
- Born: 1975 (age 50–51)
- Party: Socialists' Party of Catalonia (since 1996)

Jordi Riba i Colom (born 1975) is a Spanish politician serving as a member of the Parliament of Catalonia since 2021. He has served as first secretary of the Socialists' Party of Catalonia in Anoia since 2024.
