= Laia Estrada =

Catalan activist and politician (born 1982)

Laia Estrada Cañón
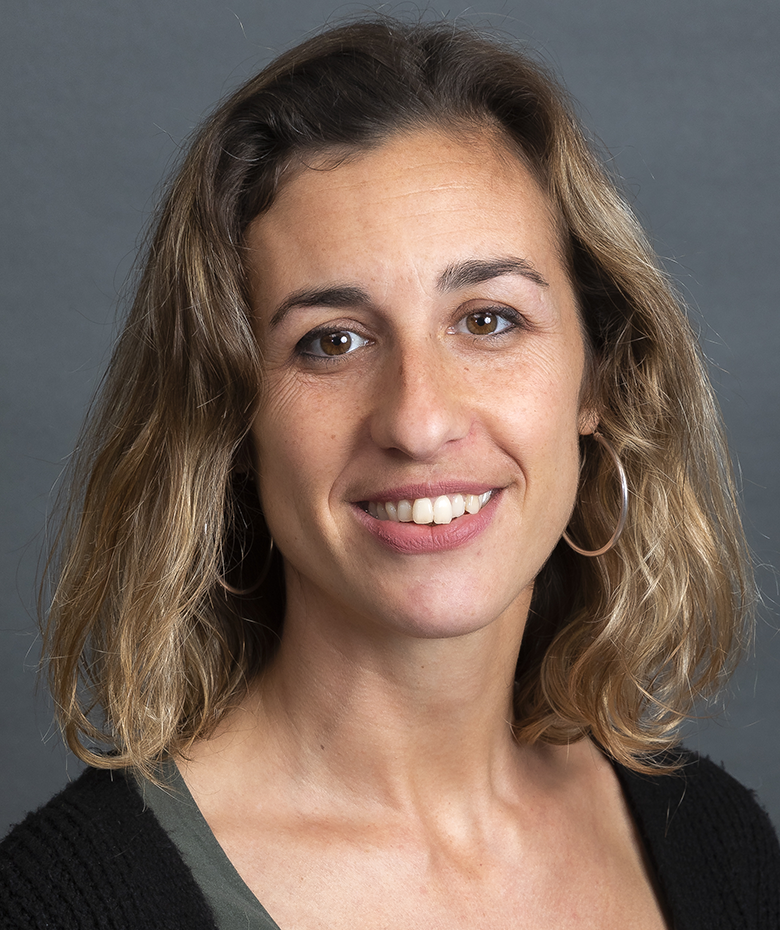
- Estrada i Cañón in 2021

Member of the Parliament of Catalonia
- In office 12 March 2021 – 23 July 2025
- Succeeded by: Xavier Pellicer
- Constituency: Tarragona (2021–2024); Barcelona (2024–2025)

Member of the Tarragona City Council
- In office 13 June 2015 – 19 March 2021

Personal details
- Born: Laia Estrada Cañón; 19 September 1982 (age 44) Tarragona, Catalonia, Spain
- Party: Endavant (since 2008); Popular Unity Candidacy (since 2012)
- Education: University of Girona; Autonomous University of Barcelona
- Occupation: Teacher • writer • politician

Laia Estrada Cañón (Catalan pronunciation: [ˈlajə əsˈtɾaðə] born 19 September 1982) is a Catalan teacher, writer and politician. She has a degree in Environmental Sciences from the University of Girona and a master's degree in Territorial and Population Studies at the Autonomous University of Barcelona.

She has participated in feminist movements, in defence of public health, she is part of the public health defence group in Tarragona, and for the right to housing. She was a councilor in the Tarragona City Council for the Popular Unity Candidacy from 2015 until March 2021. She headed, with Edgar Fernández, the list of the CUP in the constituency of Tarragona in the elections to the Parliament of Catalonia in 2021, being elected.
