= Board of the Parliament of Catalonia =

Government agency

Coordinates: 41°23′17.4″N 2°11′20.2″E

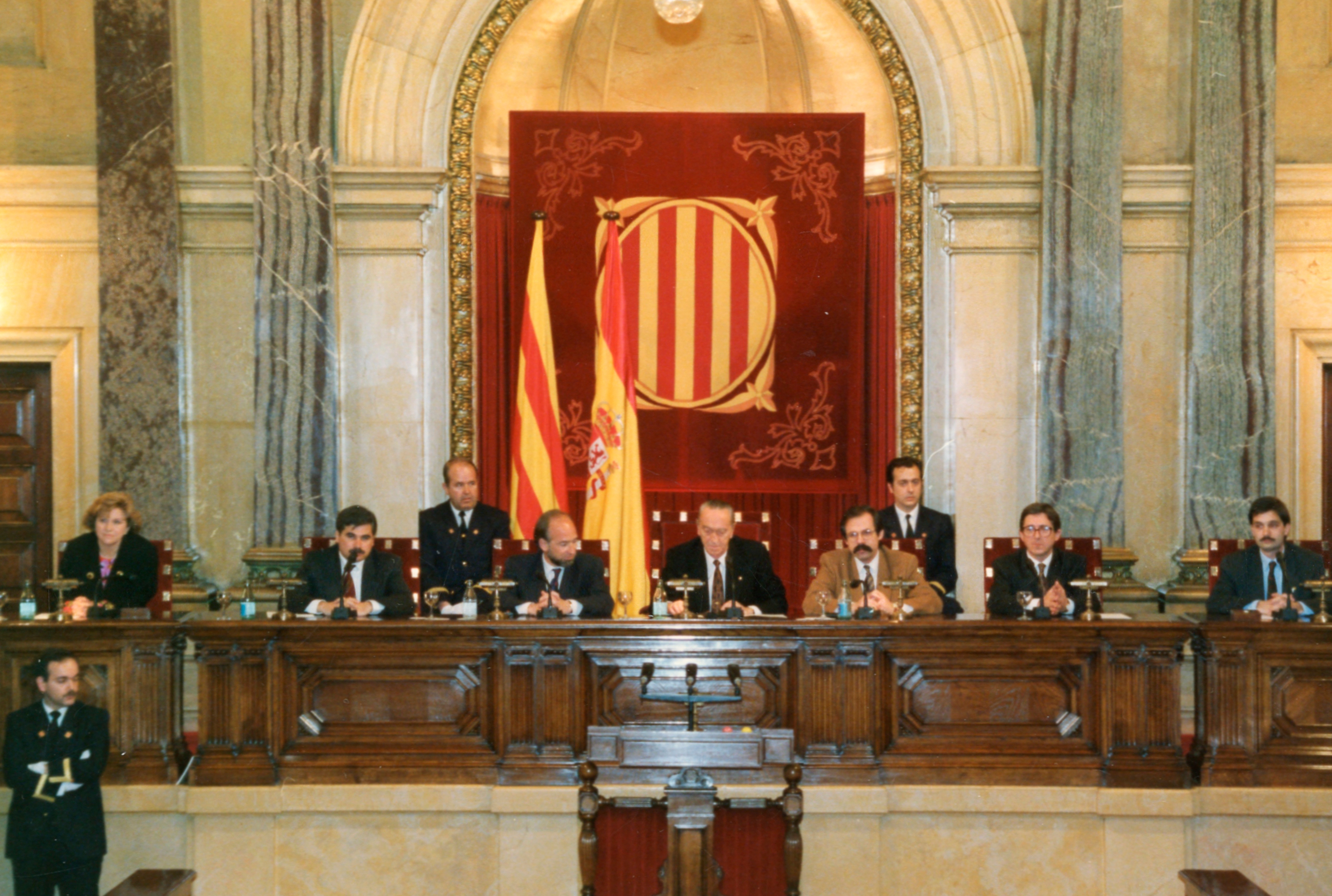
Board of the Parliament of Catalonia with members of the Fourth Parliament

The Board of the Parliament of Catalonia (Catalan: Mesa del Parlament) is the body responsible for the management of the Parliament of Catalonia. It is composed of the President of the Parliament, the two Vice-Presidents of the Parliament and four Secretaries, who are elected (in separate votes) by the Plenary Assembly.

The main functions of the Board are

- to organize the work of Parliament;
- to interpret parliamentary procedure;
- to manage the various support services of Parliament.

The President (or one of the Vice-Presidents as necessary) is also responsible for chairing sessions of the Plenary Assembly, and for the external representation of Parliament.

== Members ==
=== First Parliament ===
Name	Portrait	Party	Office	Took office	Left office	Refs
Heribert Barrera		Republican Left of Catalonia	President	10 April 1980	20 March 1984	
Isidre Molas		Socialists' Party of Catalonia	First Vice-President	10 April 1980	9 September 1980	
Concepció Ferrer i Casals		Democratic Union of Catalonia	First Vice-President	9 September 1980	20 March 1984	
Concepció Ferrer i Casals		Democratic Union of Catalonia	Second Vice-President	10 April 1980	9 September 1980	
Isidre Molas		Socialists' Party of Catalonia	Second Vice-President	9 September 1980	20 March 1984	
Ramon Camp i Batalla		Democratic Convergence of Catalonia	First Secretary	10 April 1980	20 March 1984	
Felip Lorda i Alaiz		Socialists' Party of Catalonia	Second Secretary	10 April 1980	20 March 1984	
Ramon Espasa i Oliver		Unified Socialist Party of Catalonia	Third Secretary	10 April 1980	9 September 1980	
Enrique Manuel-Rimbau Tomás		Centrists of Catalonia	Third Secretary	9 September 1980	20 March 1984	
Enrique Manuel-Rimbau Tomás		Centrists of Catalonia	Fourth Secretary	10 April 1980	9 September 1980	
Ramon Espasa i Oliver		Unified Socialist Party of Catalonia	Fourth Secretary	9 September 1980	11 October 1983	
Marcel Planellas i Aran		Unified Socialist Party of Catalonia	Fourth Secretary	11 October 1983	20 March 1984	

=== Second Parliament ===
Name	Portrait	Party	Office	Took office	Left office	Refs
Miquel Coll i Alentorn		Democratic Union of Catalonia	President	17 May 1984	4 April 1988	
Arcadi Calzada i Salavedra		Democratic Convergence of Catalonia	First Vice-President	17 May 1984	4 April 1988	
Isidre Molas		Socialists' Party of Catalonia	Second Vice-President	17 May 1984	4 April 1988	
Ramon Camp i Batalla		Democratic Convergence of Catalonia	First Secretary	17 May 1984	4 April 1988	
Felip Lorda i Alaiz		Socialists' Party of Catalonia	Second Secretary	17 May 1984	4 April 1988	
Flora Sanabra i Villarroya		Democratic Convergence of Catalonia	Third Secretary	17 May 1984	4 April 1988	
Marçal Casanovas i Guerri		Republican Left of Catalonia	Fourth Secretary	17 May 1984	4 April 1988	

=== Third Parliament ===
Name	Portrait	Party	Office	Took office	Left office	Refs
Joaquim Xicoy i Bassegoda		Democratic Union of Catalonia	President	16 June 1988	21 January 1992	
Arcadi Calzada i Salavedra		Democratic Convergence of Catalonia	First Vice-President	16 June 1988	21 January 1992	
Antoni Dalmau i Ribalta		Socialists' Party of Catalonia	Second Vice-President	16 June 1988	21 January 1992	
Ramon Camp i Batalla		Democratic Convergence of Catalonia	First Secretary	16 June 1988	21 January 1992	
Luís Andrés García Sáez		Socialists' Party of Catalonia	Second Secretary	16 June 1988	9 January 1992	
Flora Sanabra i Villarroya		Democratic Convergence of Catalonia	Third Secretary	16 June 1988	21 January 1992	
Celestino Andrés Sánchez Ramos		Initiative for Catalonia Greens	Fourth Secretary	16 June 1988	21 December 1989	
Rosa Fabián Martínez		Initiative for Catalonia Greens	Fourth Secretary	21 December 1989	21 January 1992	

=== Fourth Parliament ===
Name	Portrait	Party	Office	Took office	Left office	Refs
Joaquim Xicoy i Bassegoda		Democratic Union of Catalonia	President	3 April 1992	26 September 1995	
Arcadi Calzada i Salavedra		Democratic Convergence of Catalonia	First Vice-President	3 April 1992	26 September 1995	
Antoni Dalmau i Ribalta		Socialists' Party of Catalonia	Second Vice-President	3 April 1992	26 September 1995	
Ramon Camp i Batalla		Democratic Convergence of Catalonia	First Secretary	3 April 1992	16 June 1993	
Flora Sanabra i Villarroya		Democratic Convergence of Catalonia	First Secretary	16 June 1993	26 September 1995	
Xavier Guitart i Domènech		Socialists' Party of Catalonia	Second Secretary	3 April 1992	26 September 1995	
Flora Sanabra i Villarroya		Democratic Convergence of Catalonia	Third Secretary	3 April 1992	16 June 1993	
Enric Castellnou i Alberch		Democratic Convergence of Catalonia	Third Secretary	16 June 1993	26 September 1995	
Xavier Bosch i Garcia		Republican Left of Catalonia	Fourth Secretary	3 April 1992	26 September 1995	

=== Fifth Parliament ===
Name	Portrait	Party	Office	Took office	Left office	Refs
Joan Reventós		Socialists' Party of Catalonia	President	5 December 1995	24 August 1999	
Domènec Sesmilo i Rius		Democratic Union of Catalonia	First Vice-President	5 December 1995	24 August 1999	
Simó Pujol i Folcrà		People's Party of Catalonia	Second Vice-President	5 December 1995	24 August 1999	
Raimon Escudé i Pladellorens		Democratic Convergence of Catalonia	First Secretary	5 December 1995	24 August 1999	
Xavier Bosch i Garcia		Republican Left of Catalonia	Second Secretary	5 December 1995	22 October 1996	
Ernest Benach		Republican Left of Catalonia	Second Secretary	22 October 1996	24 August 1999	
Francesc Codina i Castillo		Democratic Convergence of Catalonia	Third Secretary	5 December 1995	24 August 1999	
Imma Mayol i Beltran		Initiative for Catalonia Greens	Fourth Secretary	5 December 1995	16 June 1998	
Roc Fuentes i Navarro		Initiative for Catalonia Greens	Fourth Secretary	16 June 1998	24 August 1999	

=== Sixth Parliament ===
Name	Portrait	Party	Office	Took office	Left office	Refs
Joan Rigol		Democratic Union of Catalonia	President	5 November 1999	23 September 2003	
Higini Clotas i Cierco		Socialists' Party of Catalonia	First Vice-President	5 November 1999	23 September 2003	
Dolors Montserrat i Culleré		People's Party of Catalonia	Second Vice-President	5 November 1999	23 September 2003	
Carme Valls i Llobet		Socialists' Party of Catalonia	First Secretary	5 November 1999	23 September 2003	
Ernest Benach		Republican Left of Catalonia	Second Secretary	5 November 1999	23 September 2003	
Francesc Codina i Castillo		Democratic Convergence of Catalonia	Third Secretary	5 November 1999	16 June 2000	
Esteve Orriols i Sendra		Democratic Convergence of Catalonia	Third Secretary	16 June 2000	23 September 2003	
Isidre Gavín i Valls		Democratic Convergence of Catalonia	Fourth Secretary	5 November 1999	23 September 2003	

=== Seventh Parliament ===
Name	Portrait	Party	Office	Took office	Left office	Refs
Ernest Benach		Republican Left of Catalonia	President	5 December 2003	8 September 2006	
Higini Clotas i Cierco		Socialists' Party of Catalonia	First Vice-President	5 December 2003	8 September 2006	
Ramon Camp i Batalla		Democratic Convergence of Catalonia	Second Vice-President	5 December 2003	8 September 2006	
Anna Miranda i Torres		Democratic Union of Catalonia	First Secretary	5 December 2003	8 September 2006	
Carme Carretero i Romay		Socialists' Party of Catalonia	Second Secretary	5 December 2003	8 September 2006	
Rafael Luna i Vivas		People's Party of Catalonia	Third Secretary	5 December 2003	8 September 2006	
Marina Llansana i Rosich		Republican Left of Catalonia	Fourth Secretary	5 December 2003	24 March 2004	
Elisabet Font Montanyà		Initiative for Catalonia Greens	Fourth Secretary	24 March 2004	8 September 2006	

=== Eighth Parliament ===
The composition of the Board of the Eighth legislature was published in the Butlletí Oficial del Parlament de Catalunya on 17 November 2006.

Name	Portrait	Party	Office	Took office	Left office	Refs
Ernest Benach		Republican Left of Catalonia	President	17 November 2006	5 December 2010	
Higini Clotas i Cierco		Socialists' Party of Catalonia	First Vice-President	17 November 2006	5 December 2010	
Ramon Camp i Batalla		Democratic Convergence of Catalonia	Second Vice-President	17 November 2006	23 September 2008	
Lluís Maria Corominas i Díaz		Democratic Convergence of Catalonia	Second Vice-President	30 September 2008	5 December 2010	
Lídia Santos i Arnau		Socialists' Party of Catalonia	First Secretary	17 November 2006	5 December 2010	
Antoni Castellà i Clavé		Democratic Union of Catalonia	Second Secretary	17 November 2006	5 December 2010	
Jordi Miralles		Party of the Communists of Catalonia	Third Secretary	17 November 2006	5 December 2010	
Rafael Luna i Vivas		People's Party of Catalonia	Fourth Secretary	17 November 2006	5 December 2010	

=== Ninth Parliament ===
The Board of the ninth Parliament of Catalonia was elected on 16 December 2010.

Name	Portrait	Party	Office	Took office	Left office	Refs
Núria de Gispert		Democratic Union of Catalonia	President	16 December 2010	2 October 2012	
Lluís Maria Corominas i Díaz		Democratic Convergence of Catalonia	First Vice-President	16 December 2010	2 October 2012	
Higini Clotas i Cierco		Socialists' Party of Catalonia	Second Vice-President	16 December 2010	2 October 2012	
Jordi Cornet i Serra		People's Party of Catalonia	First Secretary	16 December 2010	17 January 2012	
Pere Calbó i Roca		People's Party of Catalonia	First Secretary	17 January 2012	2 October 2012	
Montserrat Tura		Socialists' Party of Catalonia	Second Secretary	16 December 2010	2 October 2012	
Josep Rull i Andreu		Democratic Convergence of Catalonia	Third Secretary	16 December 2010	2 October 2012	
Maria Dolors Batalla i Nogués		Democratic Convergence of Catalonia	Fourth Secretary	16 December 2010	2 October 2012	

=== Tenth Parliament ===
Name	Portrait	Party	Office	Took office	Left office	Refs
Núria de Gispert		Democratic Union of Catalonia	President	12 December 2012	4 August 2015	
Anna Simó		Republican Left of Catalonia	First Vice-President	12 December 2012	4 August 2015	
Lluís Maria Corominas i Díaz		Democratic Convergence of Catalonia	Second Vice-President	12 December 2012	4 August 2015	
Miquel Iceta		Socialists' Party of Catalonia	First Secretary	12 December 2012	23 July 2014	
Pere Navarro		Socialists' Party of Catalonia	First Secretary	23 July 2014	4 August 2015	
Pere Calbó i Roca		People's Party of Catalonia	Second Secretary	12 December 2012	4 August 2015	
Josep Rull i Andreu		Democratic Convergence of Catalonia	Third Secretary	12 December 2012	4 August 2015	
David Companyon i Costa		Revolutionary Workers' Party	Fourth Secretary	12 December 2012	4 August 2015	

=== Eleventh Parliament ===
The Board of the eleventh Parliament of Catalonia was elected on 26 October 2015.

Name	Portrait	Party	Office	Took office	Left office	Refs
Carme Forcadell		Republican Left of Catalonia	President	26 October 2015	28 October 2017	
Lluís Maria Corominas i Díaz		Democratic Convergence of Catalonia	First Vice-President	26 October 2015	25 July 2017	
Lluís Guinó i Subirós		Democratic Convergence of Catalonia	First Vice-President	25 July 2017	28 October 2017	
José María Espejo-Saavedra Conesa		Citizens	Second Vice-President	26 October 2015	28 October 2017	
Anna Simó		Republican Left of Catalonia	First Secretary	26 October 2015	28 October 2017	
David Pérez i Ibáñez		Socialists' Party of Catalonia	Second Secretary	26 October 2015	28 October 2017	
Joan Josep Nuet i Pujals		Communists of Catalonia	Third Secretary	26 October 2015	28 October 2017	
Ramona Barrufet i Santacana		Democratic Convergence of Catalonia	Fourth Secretary	26 October 2015	28 October 2017	

=== Twelfth Parliament ===
The Board of the twelfth Parliament of Catalonia was elected on 17 January 2018.

Name	Portrait	Party	Office	Took office	Left office	Refs
Roger Torrent		Republican Left of Catalonia	President	17 January 2018	12 March 2021	
Josep Costa i Rosselló		Independent	First Vice-President	17 January 2018	12 March 2021	
José María Espejo-Saavedra Conesa		Citizens	Second Vice-President	17 January 2018	20 May 2019	
Joan García González		Citizens	Second Vice-President	29 May 2019	12 March 2021	
Eusebi Campdepadrós i Pucurull		Independent	First Secretary	17 January 2018	12 March 2021	
David Pérez i Ibáñez		Socialists' Party of Catalonia	Second Secretary	17 January 2018	12 March 2021	
Joan García González		Citizens	Third Secretary	17 January 2018	29 May 2019	
Laura Vílchez Sánchez		Citizens	Third Secretary	29 May 2019	12 March 2021	
Alba Vergés		Republican Left of Catalonia	Fourth Secretary	17 January 2018	6 June 2018	
Adriana Delgado i Herreros		Republican Left of Catalonia	Fourth Secretary	6 June 2018	26 November 2019	
Rut Ribas i Martí		Republican Left of Catalonia	Fourth Secretary	26 November 2019	12 March 2021	

=== Thirteenth Parliament ===
The Board of the thirteenth Parliament of Catalonia was elected on 12 March 2021.

Name	Portrait	Party	Office	Took office	Left office	Refs
Laura Borràs		Together for Catalonia	President	12 March 2021		
Anna Caula i Paretas		Republican Left of Catalonia	First Vice-President	12 March 2021		
Eva Granados		Socialists' Party of Catalonia	Second Vice-President	12 March 2021		
Ferran Pedret i Santos		Socialists' Party of Catalonia	First Secretary	12 March 2021		
Jaume Alonso-Cuevillas		Together for Catalonia	Second Secretary	12 March 2021		
Pau Juvillà i Ballester		Popular Unity Candidacy	Third Secretary	12 March 2021		
Ruben Wagensberg		Republican Left of Catalonia	Fourth Secretary	12 March 2021		
