= Trial of Catalonia independence leaders =

Ongoing trials of supporters of Catalan independence from Spain

Causa Especial 20907/2017
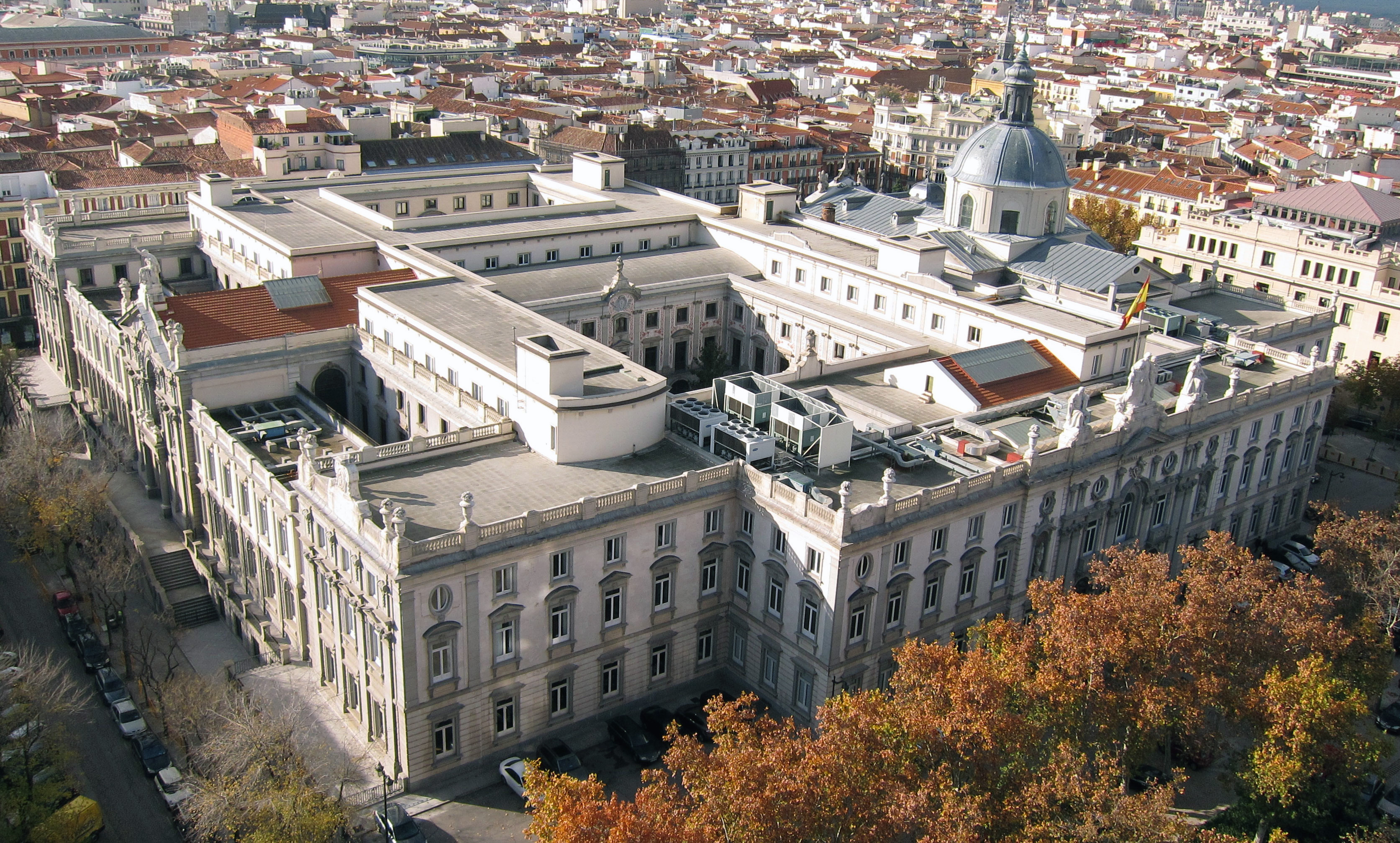
- Supreme Court of Spain in Madrid.
- Court: Supreme Court of Spain
- Full case name: Causa Especial número: 20907/2017 del Tribunal Supremo de España
- Decided: 14 October 2019
- Transcripts: Summary; Popular accusation by Vox; Supreme Court's verdict

Case history
- Subsequent actions: Nine defendants sentenced to 9 to 13 years in prison on sedition and misuse of public funds charges; three other defendants fined for disobedience
- Related action: Six defendants sent their cases to the High Court of Justice of Catalonia

Court membership
- Judges sitting: Manuel Marchena (president); Antonio del Moral García; Luciano Varela; Andrés Martínez Arrieta; Juan Ramón Berdugo Gómez de la Torre; Ana María Ferrer García; Andrés Palomo del Arco

Case opinions
- Concur/dissent: Unanimous ruling

Keywords
- 2017 Catalan independence referendum

The trial of Catalonia independence leaders, legally named Causa Especial 20907/2017 and popularly known as the Causa del procés, was an oral trial that began on 12 February 2019 in the Supreme Court of Spain. The case was tried by seven judges and was chaired by judge Manuel Marchena. Judge Pablo Llarena had previously coordinated an instruction between October 2017 and July 2018, as a result of which 12 people were tried, including the previous vice president Oriol Junqueras of the regional government and most of the cabinet as well as political activists Jordi Sànchez and Jordi Cuixart and the former Speaker of the Parliament of Catalonia Carme Forcadell. Some defendants remained in pre-trial detention without bail from the beginning of the instruction process and have thus already served part of their sentence.

The accused were tried for the events surrounding the organization and celebration of the 2017 Catalan independence referendum after it was declared illegal and was suspended by the Constitutional Court of Spain, the passing of laws to override the Constitution of Spain and Statute of Autonomy of Catalonia that were declared illegal and the Catalan declaration of independence on 27 October 2017.

The trial proceedings officially ended on 12 June 2019. A unanimous verdict by the seven judges that tried the case was made public on 14 October 2019. Nine of the 12 accused received prison sentences for the crimes of sedition; of them, four were also found guilty of misuse of public funds. Their sentences ranged from 9 to 13 years. The remaining three accused were found guilty of disobedience and were sentenced to pay a fine but received no prison term. The court dismissed the charges of rebellion. Some of the defendants of the trial have expressed their intention to appeal to the Constitutional Court of Spain and the European Court of Human Rights. The verdict delivered by the Supreme Court sparked multiple protests across the region.

In June 2021, the nine jailed leaders were pardoned. Prime Minister Pedro Sánchez said that he pardoned them because it was the best decision for Spain and Catalonia, but did not overturn their bans from holding public office.

In 2023, Pedro Sanchez gave the leaders an amnesty following the negotiations in the aftermath of the 2023 general election, leading to the 2023–2024 Spanish protests against the Amnesty Law.

== Background ==
Catalonia is an autonomous community in Spain, with the capital in Barcelona. As the County of Barcelona, it joined the Crown of Aragon in the 12th century. Within the Crown, Barcelona and the other Catalan counties merged into the Principality of Catalonia. The whole of the Crown of Aragon united at the end of the 15th century with the Crown of Castile. Today, Catalonia is part of modern Spain. The inhabitants of the region are mostly bilingual in Spanish and in Catalan, and have a distinct linguistic, cultural and historical heritage. Despite belonging to Spain, throughout the history of the region, separatist movements have existed at various moments in the past.

On 9 November 2014, a non-binding 2014 Catalan self-determination referendum was held. After the Spanish Government refused to allow a binding referendum, pro-independence parties called for the 2015 Catalan regional election to be considered a plebiscite, with the promise to declare independence in 18 months. Pro-independence parties earned a majority in the Parliament but were backed by less than 50% of the voters. In September 2017, the Parliament of Catalonia approved the Law of the referendum on self-determination of Catalonia, as well as the Law of juridical transition and foundation of the Republic which was to be applied two days after the referendum results were made public and would override the Constitution of Spain and Statute of Autonomy of Catalonia while providing the Parliament with special powers to declare the secession of Catalonia from the Kingdom of Spain. Both laws were declared illegal by the Constitutional Court of Spain. The 2017 Catalan independence referendum, which was called by the Generalitat de Catalunya on 1 October 2017, was also suspended by the same court. Despite this ruling, the referendum went ahead. On 10 October 2017, the President of the Catalan Government Carles Puigdemont addressed the Parliament of Catalonia, but did not unambiguously declare independence. On 27 October 2017, the Parliament of Catalonia passed a resolution declaring the independence of Catalonia, but no actions were initiated to enforce it. Hours later, the Government of Spain seized control of the Generalitat, invoking Article 155 of the Spanish Constitution. Subsequently, some of the independence leaders were sent to preventive detention without bail, accused of crimes of rebellion, disobedience, and misuse of public funds. Carles Puigdemont and four members of his cabinet fled into self-exile.

== Prosecutors ==
The prosecution was formed by the State Prosecutor's Office and the State Attorney's Office, with the right-wing political party Vox as public prosecutor. The defendants were accused of the crimes of rebellion, disobedience, and misuse of public funds.

- Spanish Attorney General: The prosecutors of the Criminal Chamber of the Supreme Court who drafted the indictment were Javier Zaragoza, Fidel Cadena, Consuelo Madrigal, and Jaime Moreno, maintaining the lawsuit for rebellion filed by José Manuel Maza, former attorney general of the state, in 2017 and the instruction of Judge Pablo Llarena. According to the prosecution's text, "the secessionist plan included the use of all the means necessary to achieve its objective, including - with the certainty that the state would not accept the situation - the violence necessary to ensure the pretentious criminal outcome, using the intimidating force that represented, on the one hand, the tumultuous action deployed with the large mobilizations of citizens instigated and promoted by them, and, on the other, the use of the Mossos d'Esquadra, armed police made up by approximately 17,000 troops who would exclusively abide by their instructions -as was the case- and that, if necessary, they could coercively protect their criminal objectives, thus subtracting the fulfillment of the genuine function of keeping and preserving the constitutional order".
- The State's advocacy body was presented to the cause in March 2018. According to its submitted text, consellers (ministers) Junqueras, Forn, Turull, Romeva, Rull, and Bassa must receive a more serious punishment for their authority status, as responsible parties for having induced, sustained and directed the sedition from its condition of members of the Catalan Government. The rest are accused of having executed the referendum using public funds and of disobedience for having systematically ignored the agreements of the Constitutional Court. The activists Jordi Cuixart and Jordi Sànchez are accused of having induced, sustained and directed a crime of sedition. In December 2018, the director of the State's legal service, Consuelo Castro, replaced Edmundo Bal in favour of Rosa Maria Seoane as a representative for the cause.
- Vox: This political party was admitted as a public prosecutor in November 2017 by magistrate Maria Eugènia Alegret, provided they paid a deposit of 20,000 euros. In Spanish law, a private person under certain circumstances can prosecute criminal charges of public importance. According to Vox, a "binding" referendum was promoted and that supposed "a clear attempt to subvert the constitutional order" to "disintegrate the territorial unity of the State", by which they understand the events that occurred as a "subversive attack against the current constitutional order", as a coup strategy to hold an "illegal referendum" on the 1 October 2017. Jordi Cuixart's defense lodged an appeal with the Supreme Court, demanding that the right-wing party be expelled from the proceedings and not be able to participate in the trial. The Supreme Court, despite criticizing "the risk of transferring the political dispute to the legal process", eventually dismissed the appeal. Javier Ortega Smith, lawyer and Secretary-General of Vox, and Pedro Fernández, Vox "Legal Vice-Secretary", will represent the popular action during the trial.

== Defendants ==
There were a total of 18 people being tried within the context of this case. They are listed below in alphabetical order by their last name, indicating the accusation, the conviction requested and the sentence by the Supreme Court.

=== Supreme Court ===
Politicians and activists
Name	Portrait	Office	Attorney General prosecution		Solicitor General prosecution		Vox prosecution		Defense lawyer	Verdict	
Name	Portrait	Office	Charge	Requested sentence	Charge	Requested sentence	Charge	Requested sentence	Defense lawyer	Crime	Sentence
Dolors Bassa		Minister of Social Welfare, Employment and Family	Rebellion; Misuse of public funds	16 years imprisonment; 16 years absolute disqualification	Sedition; Misuse of public funds	11 years & 6 months imprisonment; 11 years & 6 months absolute disqualification	Rebellion; Criminal organization; Misuse of public funds	74 years imprisonment	Mariano Bergés	Sedition with misuse of public funds	12 years imprisonment and 12 years ban to hold office
Meritxell Borràs		Minister of Governance, Public Administration and Housing	Disobedience; Misuse of public funds	7 years imprisonment; 16 years absolute disqualification; €100 fine per day for 10 months	Sedition; Misuse of public funds	7 years imprisonment; 10 years absolute disqualification; €100 fine per day for 10 months	Criminal organization; Disobedience; Misuse of public funds	24 years imprisonment; 2 years special disqualification; €108,000 fine		Disobedience	Fined during 10 months
Jordi Cuixart		President of Òmnium Cultural	Rebellion; Misuse of public funds	17 years imprisonment; 17 years absolute disqualification	Sedition	8 years imprisonment; 8 years absolute disqualification	Rebellion (two crimes); Sedition (two crimes); Criminal organization	52 years imprisonment	Marina Roig and Benet Salellas	Sedition	9 years imprisonment and 9 years ban to hold office
Carme Forcadell		President of the Parliament of Catalonia	Rebellion	17 years imprisonment; 17 years absolute disqualification	Sedition; Misuse of public funds	10 years imprisonment; 10 years absolute disqualification	Rebellion (two crimes); Sedition (two crimes); Criminal organization; Disobedience	52 years imprisonment; 2 years special disqualification; €108,000 fine	Olga Arderiu Ripoll and Raimon Tomás Vinardell	Sedition	11 years and six months imprisonment and 11 years and six months ban to hold office
Joaquim Forn		Minister of the Interior	Rebellion; Misuse of public funds	16 years imprisonment; 16 years absolute disqualification	Sedition; Misuse of public funds	11 years & 6 months imprisonment; 11 years & 6 months absolute disqualification	Rebellion; Criminal organization; Misuse of public funds	74 years imprisonment	Xavier Melero	Sedition	10 years and six months imprisonment and 10 years and six months ban to hold office
Oriol Junqueras		Vice President of Catalonia	Rebellion; Misuse of public funds	25 years imprisonment; 25 years absolute disqualification	Sedition; Misuse of public funds	12 years imprisonment; 12 years absolute disqualification	Rebellion; Criminal organization; Misuse of public funds	74 years imprisonment	Andreu Van den Eynde	Sedition with misuse of public funds	13 years imprisonment and 13 years ban to hold office
Carles Mundó		Minister of Justice	Disobedience; Misuse of public funds	7 years imprisonment; 16 years absolute disqualification; €100 fine per day for 10 months	Sedition; Misuse of public funds	7 years imprisonment; 10 years absolute disqualification; €100 fine per day for 10 months	Criminal organization; Disobedience; Misuse of public funds	24 years imprisonment; 2 years special disqualification; €108,000 fine	Josep Orilla	Disobedience	Fined during 10 months
Raül Romeva		Minister of Foreign Affairs, Institutional Relations, and Transparency	Rebellion; Misuse of public funds	16 years imprisonment; 16 years absolute disqualification	Sedition; Misuse of public funds	11 years & 6 months imprisonment; 11 years & 6 months absolute disqualification	Rebellion; Criminal organization; Misuse of public funds	74 years imprisonment	Andreu Van Den Eynde	Sedition with misuse of public funds	12 years imprisonment and 12 years ban to hold office
Josep Rull		Minister of Planning and Sustainability	Rebellion; Misuse of public funds	16 years imprisonment; 16 years absolute disqualification	Sedition; Misuse of public funds	11 years & 6 months imprisonment; 11 years & 6 months absolute disqualification	Rebellion; Criminal organization; Misuse of public funds	74 years imprisonment	Jordi Pina	Sedition	10 years and six months imprisonment and 10 years and six months ban to hold office
Jordi Sànchez		President of the Catalan National Assembly	Rebellion; Misuse of public funds	17 years imprisonment; 17 years absolute disqualification	Sedition	8 years imprisonment; 8 years absolute disqualification	Rebellion (two crimes); Sedition (two crimes); Criminal organisation	52 years imprisonment	Jordi Pina	Sedition	12 years imprisonment and 12 years ban to hold office
Jordi Turull		Minister of Presidency & Government Spokesperson	Rebellion; Misuse of public funds	16 years prison; 16 years absolute disqualification	Sedition; Misuse of public funds	11 years & 6 months imprisonment; 11 years & 6 months absolute disqualification	Rebellion; Criminal organization; Misuse of public funds	74 years imprisonment	Jordi Pina	Sedition with misuse of public funds	12 years imprisonment and 12 years ban to hold office
Santi Vila		Minister of Culture	Disobedience; Misuse of public funds	7 years imprisonment; 16 years absolute disqualification; €100 fine per day for 10 months	Misuse of public funds	7 years imprisonment; 10 years absolute disqualification	Criminal organization; Disobedience; Misuse of public funds	24 years imprisonment; 2 years special disqualification; €108,000 fine	Joan Segarra	Disobedience	Fined during 10 months

=== High Court of Justice of Catalonia ===
The following six defendants were charged in the instruction of the Supreme Court yet it decided to send their cases to the High Court of Justice of Catalonia:

Politicians
Name	Portrait	Office	Attorney General prosecution		Solicitor General prosecution		Vox prosecution		Defense lawyer
Name	Portrait	Office	Charge	Requested sentence	Charge	Requested sentence	Charge	Requested sentence	Defense lawyer
Ramona Barrufet		Fourth Secretary of the Parliament of Catalonia	Disobedience	1 year & 8 months special disqualification; €100 fine per day for 10 months	Serious disobedience	1 year & 8 months special disqualification; €100 fine per day for 10 months	Criminal organization; Disobedience	12 years imprisonment; 2 years special disqualification; €108,000 fine	Judith Gené
Mireia Boya		President of the Popular Unity Candidacy–Constituent Call parliamentary group	Disobedience	1 year & 8 months special disqualification; €100 fine per day for 10 months	Serious disobedience	1 year & 4 months special disqualification; €100 fine per day for 8 months	Criminal organization; Disobedience	12 years imprisonment; 2 years special disqualification; €108,000 fine	Benet Salellas, Isabel Afonso and Carles López
Lluís Corominas		President of the Junts pel Sí parliamentary group	Disobedience	1 year & 8 months special disqualification; €100 fine per day for 10 months	Serious disobedience	1 year & 8 months special disqualification; €100 fine per day for 10 months	Criminal organization; Disobedience	12 years imprisonment; 2 years special disqualification; €108,000 fine	
Lluís Guinó		First Vice-President of the Parliament of Catalonia	Disobedience	1 year & 8 months special disqualification; €100 fine per day for 10 months	Serious disobedience	1 year & 8 months special disqualification; €100 fine per day for 10 months	Criminal organization; Disobedience	12 years imprisonment; 2 years special disqualification; €108,000 fine	
Joan Josep Nuet		Third Secretary of the Parliament of Catalonia	Disobedience	1 year & 4 months special disqualification; €100 fine per day for 8 months	Serious disobedience	1 year & 4 months special disqualification; €100 fine per day for 8 months	Criminal organization; Disobedience	12 years imprisonment; 2 years special disqualification; €108,000 fine	Enrique Leiva
Anna Simó		First Secretary of the Parliament of Catalonia	Disobedience	1 year & 8 months special disqualification; €100 fine per day for 10 months	Serious disobedience	1 year & 8 months special disqualification; €100 fine per day for 10 months	Criminal organization; Disobedience	12 years imprisonment; 2 years special disqualification; €108,000 fine	Olga Arderiu Ripoll, Raimon Tomás Vinardell

=== Audiencia Nacional ===
In addition, the prosecutor of the Spanish National Court (Audiencia Nacional) is requesting prison time for the former head of the Mossos d'Esquadra, Josep Lluís Trapero, and the rest of the Mossos d'Esquadra command in 2017.

The trial began on 20 January 2020 and due to the COVID-19 pandemic in Spain it was suspended on 13 March 2020. The Audiencia Nacional resumed the trial on 8 June 2020 and the case was remitted for decision on 17 June.

On 8 June, the public prosecutor reduced the penalty against of Josep Lluís Trapero, Cèsar Puig and Pere Soler from 11 years in prison for rebellion to 10 years in prison for a crime of sedition although he announced that they would accept the disqualification for 10 years for sedition and a fine of 60.000€. Likewise, he maintained the request for 4 years in jail against Teresa Laplana.

Officials
Name	Portrait	Office	Charge	Requested sentence
Josep Lluís Trapero Álvarez		Head of the Mossos d'Esquadra	Sedition	10 years imprisonment; 10 years disqualification and a fine of 60.000€
Pere Soler		Director-General of Penitentiary Services and Director of the Mossos d'Esquadra	Sedition	10 years imprisonment; 10 years disqualification and a fine of 60.000€
Cèsar Puig		Secretary-General of the Catalan Ministry of Interior	Sedition	10 years imprisonment; 10 years disqualification and a fine of 60.000€
Teresa Laplana		Eixample District Head of the Mossos d'Esquadra	Sedition	4 years imprisonment; 11 years absolute disqualification and 5 months fine

== Court ==
The court was formed of seven members in the Criminal Chamber of the Supreme Court of Spain, chaired by Manuel Marchena:

- Manuel Marchena (Chair)
- Antonio del Moral García
- Luciano Varela
- Andrés Martínez Arrieta
- Juan Ramón Berdugo Gómez de la Torre
- Ana María Ferrer García
- Andrés Palomo del Arco

In September 2018, five of them (Manuel Marchena, Luciano Varela, Juan Ramon Berdugo, Andres Martinez Arrieta and Antonio del Moral) were recused by six of the defendants. The first four were part of the admission room that processed, on 31 October 2017, the complaint filed by the then Attorney General of the State, José Manuel Maza. One of the grounds for the recusation was that, upon admitting the complaint, these four judges could not guarantee their impartiality, a requirement for all members of the court. The Supreme Court dismissed the challenge and supported their impartiality to prosecute the case.

== Witnesses ==
The Supreme Court approved the participation of more than 300 witnesses and refused the declaration of almost 50 others. (Note: The rejected witnesses included the King of Spain Felipe VI, former Deputy Prime Minister of Spain Alfredo Pérez Rubalcaba, Pilar Rahola, Noam Chomsky, and Ignacio Cosidó. The participation of international figures with no clear connection to the events was also rejected as their testimony in that capacity was considered dispensable in the scope of shedding light on the deeds subject to trial. The appearance of Carles Puigdemont and Marta Rovira as witnesses, requested by the defense, was also rejected.)

On 27 February 2019, these witnesses were called to testify (in order of appearance): (Note: Roger Torrent, Speaker of the Parliament of Catalonia did not attend as he had to chair a plenary session of the regional legislature on that date.)

- Joan Tardà, ERC member of the Congress of Deputies.
- Artur Mas, former President of the Generalitat de Catalunya.
- Soraya Sáenz de Santamaría, former Deputy Prime Minister of Spain.
- Mariano Rajoy, former Prime Minister of Spain.
- Cristóbal Montoro, former Minister of the Treasury and Public Function of Spain
- Marta Pascal, member of the Senate and former general coordinator of PDeCAT.
- Antonio Baños, former CUP member of the Parliament of Catalonia. (Note: Baños and Reguant, as they refused to answer questions from the popular action, Vox, were expelled from the court and were sanctioned with a €2,500 fine. The Supreme Court gave the witnesses 5 days to reconsider their stance.)
- Eulàlia Reguant i Cura, former CUP member of the Parliament of Catalonia. (Note: See note 3.)
- Núria de Gispert, former President of the Parliament of Catalonia.

On 28 February 2019, these witnesses testified (in order of appearance):

- Iñigo Urkullu, Lehendakari of the Basque Government.
- Gabriel Rufián, ERC member of the Congress of Deputies.
- Albano Dante Fachin, former Podemos member of the Parliament of Catalonia.
- Ernest Benach, former President of the Parliament of Catalonia.
- Ada Colau, Mayor of Barcelona.
- Juan Ignacio Zoido, former Minister of the Interior of Spain.
- Xavier Domènech i Sampere, former Podemos member of the Congress.

On 4 March 2019, these witnesses testified (in order of appearance):

- José Antonio Nieto, former Secretary of State for Security.
- Roger Torrent, President of the Parliament of Catalonia.
- José María Espejo-Saavedra Conesa, Second Deputy President of the Parliament of Catalonia.
- David Pérez Ibáñez, Second Secretary of the Parliament of Catalonia.
- Antoni Bayona, former Senior Lawyer of the Parliament.

On 5 March 2019, these witnesses testified (in order of appearance):

- Enric Millo, former Delegate of the Spanish Government in Catalonia.
- Neus Munté, former Vice President of Catalonia.
- Diego Pérez de los Cobos, Head of the operation of the National Police and the Civil Guard during 1 October referendum. (Note: Pérez de los Cobos also testified on 6 March morning.)

On 14 March 2019 testified (in order of appearance):

- Josep Lluís Trapero, former Head of the Mossos d'Esquadra.

== Accusations ==
The defendants were accused of the following crimes:

Accusations of the Public Prosecutor's Office
Crime	Article of Penal Code	Defendants	Cause
Rebellion	Article 472 and concordant	Oriol Junqueras, Joaquim Forn, Jordi Turull, Raül Romeva, Josep Rull, Dolors Bassa, Carme Forcadell, Jordi Sánchez and Jordi Cuixart	20907/2017
Misuse of public funds	Article 432 and concordant	Oriol Junqueras, Joaquim Forn, Jordi Turull, Raül Romeva, Josep Rull, Dolors Bassa, Meritxell Borràs, Carles Mundó and Santi Vila	20907/2017
Disobedience	Article 410 and concordant	Lluís Maria Corominas, Lluís Guinó, Anna Isabel Simó, Ramona Barrufet, Joan Josep Nuet, Mireia Boya, Meritxell Borràs, Carles Mundó and Santi Vila	20907/2017

Convictions by the Spanish Supreme Court
Crime	Article of Penal Code	Defendants	Cause
Sedition	Article 544 and concordant	Oriol Junqueras, Joaquim Forn, Jordi Turull, Raül Romeva, Josep Rull, Dolors Bassa, Carme Forcadell, Jordi Sánchez and Jordi Cuixart	20907/2017
Misuse of public funds	Article 432 and concordant	Oriol Junqueras, Jordi Turull, Raül Romeva, Dolors Bassa	20907/2017
Disobedience	Article 410 and concordant	Meritxell Borràs, Carles Mundó and Santi Vila	20907/2017

== Reaction ==
=== Pre-trial ===
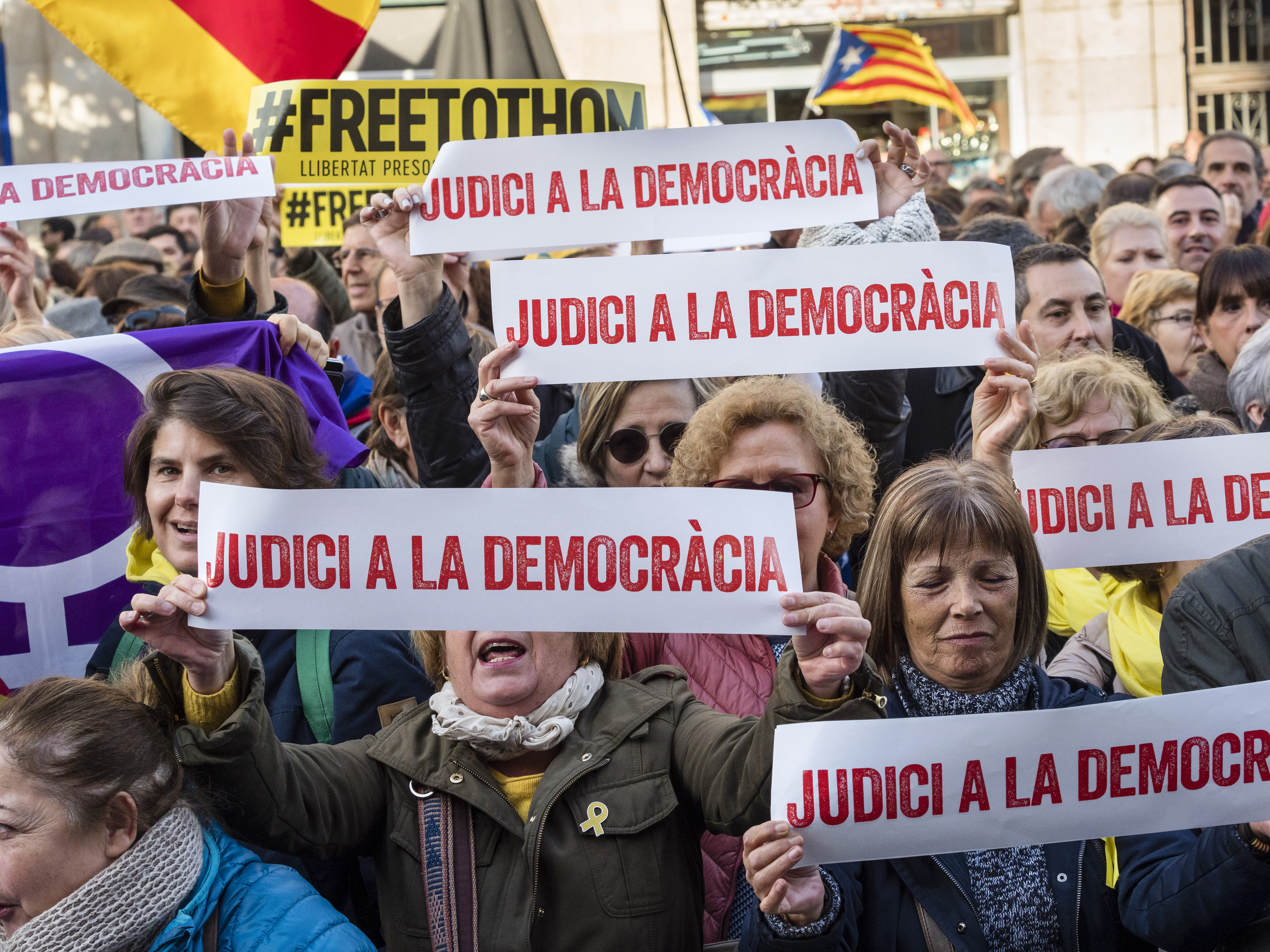
Rally against the trial in December 2018

On 7 March 2018, the Office of the United Nations High Commissioner for Human Rights reminded Spanish authorities that "pre-trial detention should be considered a measure of last resort", referring to the Catalan politicians and activists arrested after the independence referendum.

On 15 October 2018, Amnesty International requested the immediate release of the two activists Sánchez and Cuixart (known as the Jordis since they share their first name), stating that the maintenance of provisional detention was unjustified and considering it an excessive and disproportionate restriction of their rights to freedom of expression and peaceful assembly, although without referring to them as prisoners of conscience. In November 2018, Amnesty International's Campaigns Director for Europe, Fotis Filippou, announced in a letter addressed to the Jordis that he would supervise the trial "to analyze whether the guarantees of a fair trial were met". Days before the beginning of the trial, Amnesty International asked the Court to allow its observers to attend it in order to evaluate that the guarantees of a fair trial were fulfilled. The Supreme Court refused their request arguing that publicly broadcasting the trial was enough.

On 21 November 2018, more than 120 professors and law professors published a letter in the digital newspaper eldiario.es stating that neither the acts of 20 September nor 1 and 3 October 2017 saw the violence required in a crime of rebellion. A group of MEPs stated that they wanted to attend the trial as observers.

On 22 November 2018, the World Organisation Against Torture requested in an open letter addressed to the Spanish government, the Attorney General, and the ombudsman, the immediate release of Jordi Sànchez and Jordi Cuixart. The same organization recalled that they had requested for their release several times without success. The day after, the NGO Front Line Defenders also issued a statement calling for the release of Cuixart.

In December 2018, the International Association of Democratic Lawyers issued a statement requesting the release of "Catalan political prisoners".

On 1 December 2018, Jordi Sànchez and Jordi Turull declared that they were starting a hunger strike to protest against the Constitutional Court's obstacles to their appeals for protection, not allowing them to go to the European Court of Human Rights. At the time after the strike began, the Constitutional Court had eight appeals admitted without a mention of the two prisoners, with them having filed the first appeal on 22 November of the previous year. According to the law on criminal prosecution, these appeals should have been resolved within a maximum period of 30 days. On 3 December 2018, Josep Rull and Joaquim Forn declared that they would join the hunger strike on the following day.

On 19 December 2018, ex-presidents of the Generalitat, former speakers of the Catalan Parliament, and the Catalan Ombudsman (Síndic de greuges) made a public request for the politicians on hunger strike to bring it to an end. They argued that the hunger strike had already given visibility to their situation and was putting their lives in danger. A day later, the prisoners declared that they were stopping the hunger strike, since the protest "has awakened the Constitutional Court" and also since the court had already scheduled the resolution of the appeals filed.

More than 500 parliamentarians and former parliamentarians from 25 different countries signed a manifesto calling for the release of Carme Forcadell. Among these signatories were 35 MEPs and the presidents of the parliaments of Flanders, Corsica, Faroe Islands and the Basque Country. This initiative was promoted by the ex-presidents of the Catalan parliament Ernest Benach, Núria de Gispert and Joan Rigol.

On 16 January 2019, the former presidents of the Catalan Parliament, and the Generalitat de Catalunya, along with the Ombudsman at their request, signed an official statement addressed to the Supreme Court asking them to "guarantee the right of defense for the defendants". They requested alternative measures other than imprisonment during the trial for the defendants, as these measures, including daily transfers to and from the prison and extended waiting times in their cells, could "difficult continuous contact with their lawyers and limit active participation in their defense for no legal reason, thus restricting their right".

On 21 January 2019, the PEN Club International presented a manifesto signed by 148 PEN members from 100 countries around the world, denouncing the "disproportionate charges of sedition and rebellion" against the Jordis. Nobel Prize winner Mario Vargas Llosa resigned from PEN International in disagreement with the manifesto, claiming it had been pushed by the Catalonian branch of PEN International as part of an "international campaign to disfigure the truth" carried by pro-independence activists.

On 30 January 2019, the vice president of the European Commission, Frans Timmermans stated that the institution has "no reasons to doubt that the right to a fair trial is guaranteed." He added that he has no evidence pointing to "breaches of the principle of the separation of powers or issues in relation to judicial independence in Spain." in reply to a parliamentary question by Josep Maria Terricabras from the pro-independence Republican Left of Catalonia party.

The day before the beginning of the trial, 11 February 2019, the Unrepresented Nations and Peoples Organization expressed their support to "the Catalonian activists being tried" and added that "perhaps one of the biggest deficit of justice and deliberate confusion between law and justice, is seen in Catalonia.". On the same day, the European Democratic Lawyers association requested the "immediate" release of the Catalan leaders and expressed their "concern" due to a "lack of procedural guarantees during the trial". The day after, the International Commission of Jurists denounced the trial "unduly restricts rights of freedom of expression, assembly and association".

On 29 May 2019, the United Nations Working Group on Arbitrary Detention urged Spain to release Junqueras, Cuixart and Sànchez and to investigate their "arbitrary" detention and the violation of theirs rights, as well as compensating them for the time spent in jail. The Spanish government criticised the report, arguing that the reasoning for their opinion did not take into account some of the alleged crimes. Spain's government issued a statement that raised "doubts" about the group's "independence and impartiality" and called on the U.N. to make sure that its semi-independent working groups are not used "for spurious purposes".

=== Post-trial ===
On 14 October 2019, a guilty verdict was made public by the Supreme Court of Spain. Nine of the twelve accused were sentenced to prison terms ranging from 9 to 13 years after being found guilty of sedition and some of them also with misuse of public funds. This verdict caused various reactions:

Amnesty International called for the immediate release of Jordi Cuixart and Jordi Sànchez and denounced the "vague" and "overly broad" interpretation of sedition by the Spanish Supreme Court, stating that it could have negative effects on the freedom to protest in Spain. On the other hand, it also stated that there is no reason to believe this trial to be unfair according to international standards. Furthermore, Amnesty International does not recognize the convicted senior officials as political prisoners or prisoners of conscience.

==== Protests ====
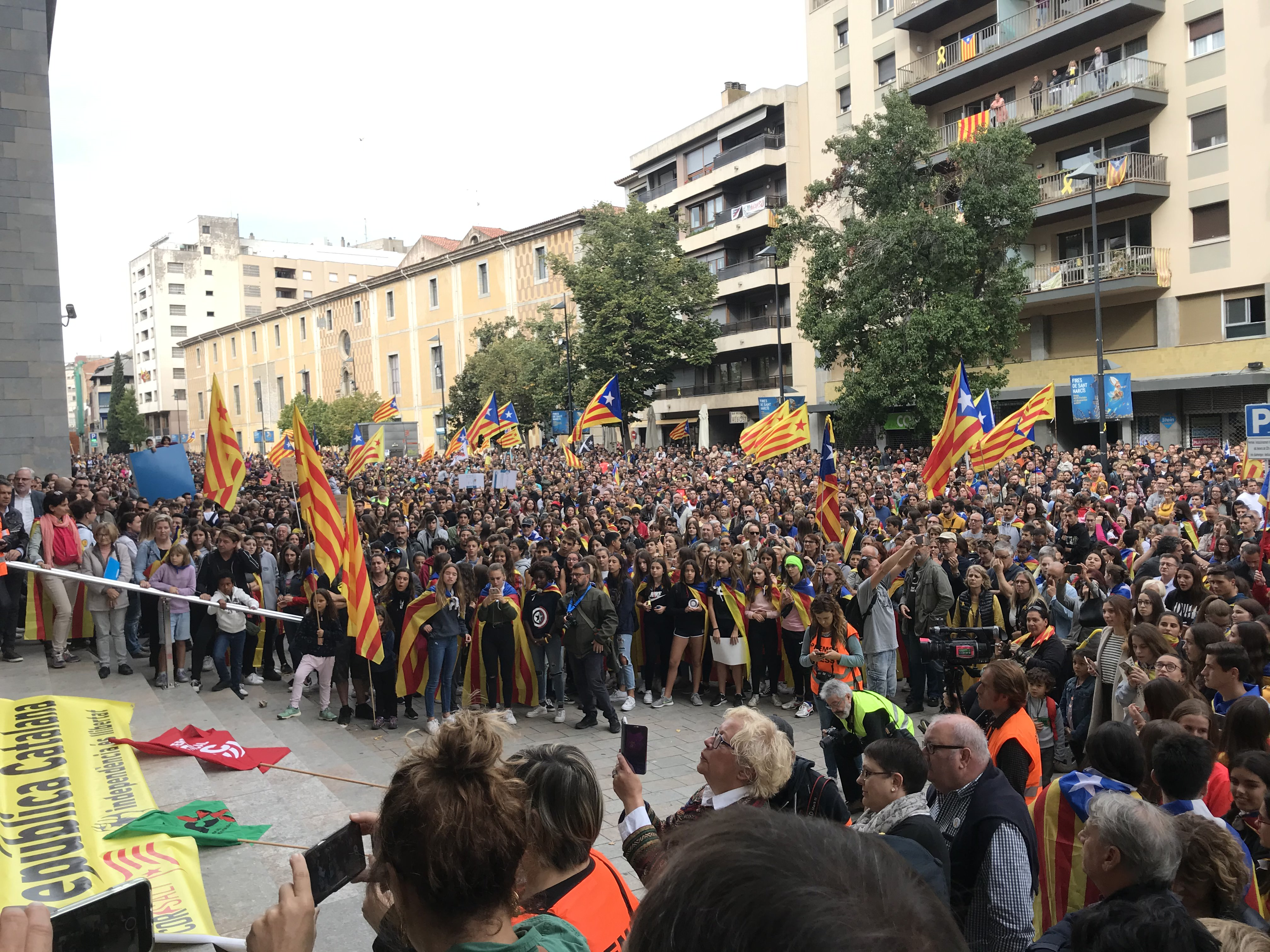
Partial view of a rally on 17 October in Barcelona

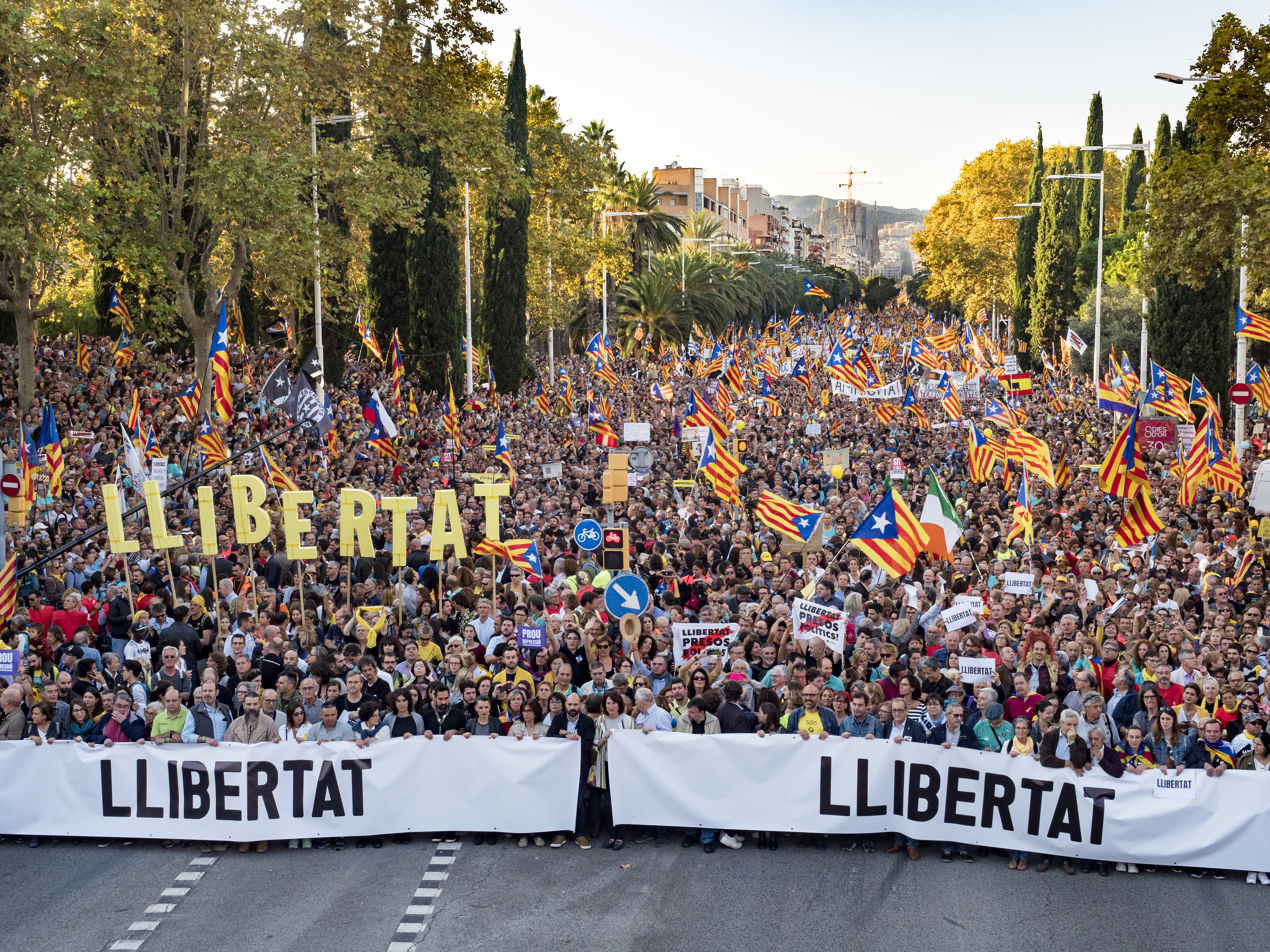
Catalan protesters in Barcelona on 26 October

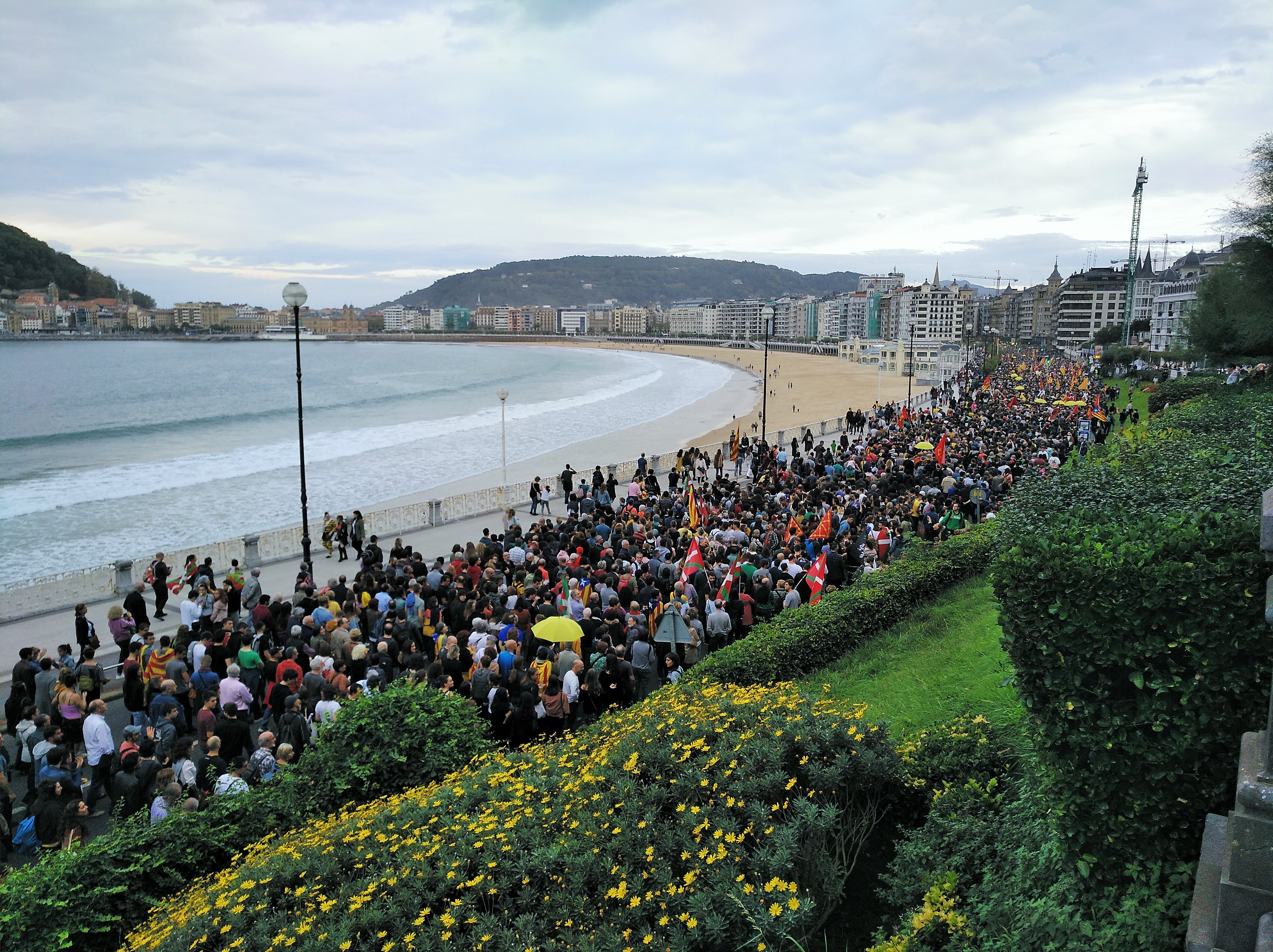
Basque solidarity with the Catalan leaders and referendum in Donostia (San Sebastián) on 19 October

As soon as the verdict was made public, large crowds of protesters gathered at Barcelona-El Prat Airport following instructions by various pro-independence associations. The protest caused 108 flights to be canceled. National and regional police charged against the demonstrators to disperse the crowds blocking the access to the airport. Some of them threw rocks, cans and used fire extinguishers. Police responded with anti-riot tactics including using batons and foam bullets. 131 protesters and 40 police officers (34 from the Mossos d'Esquadra and 6 from the national police) were injured as a result of the clashes at the airport and elsewhere on that day.

Protests also sparked in multiple places across Catalonia. There were also police charges at the Via Laietana in downtown Barcelona after demonstrators gathered at the national police headquarters, started throwing various objects at the agents who were guarding it. Protesters also blocked various roads across Catalonia as well as part of the train infrastructure and some metro stations. Protesters demanded freedom for the prisoners shouting "This is not justice, this is revenge". The transportation shutdown tactics have been described as inspired by or similar to the 2019–20 Hong Kong protests. El País reported that the leaderless group Democratic Tsunami started the airport protest, with one of its members shouting "we're going to do a Hong Kong" in Catalunya Square before the airport shutdown.

The protests continued into a second day, with groups of demonstrators in towns and cities across Catalonia. Though they started peacefully, some protestors began throwing small items at the police, with some in Barcelona setting fire to public litter bins. The regional government said that violence was limited, and performed by "small groups [that] infiltrated" the peaceful protests. Protestors also remained at the airport, cancelling another 40 flights. More protests were organised for the rest of the week, leading up to a regional strike organised by trade unions on the Friday.

==== Statements by those convicted ====
- Oriol Junqueras accused Spain of jailing them for their political ideals. He declared that the separatists would return even stronger and thanked his supporters for persevering.
- Raul Romeva claimed that they had already been enduring pre-trial detention for months and that they are being used to make the political problems chronic. He said that the sentence was aimed against their movement but that the unjust jail-term can be used as a tool for continuing fighting with more determination for their collective rights. Romeva also claimed that no sentence can change the political aspirations of millions of citizens.
- Carme Forcadell declared that "the injustice had been consummated". She argued that free parliamentarian debate is not a crime but a right that must be defended. On the day of the verdict she said "Today democracy lives a dark day, but not even in times like this should defeatism win. We will come out of this!".

==== Statements by politicians ====
- Pedro Sánchez, the Prime Minister of Spain said: “This has been a judicial process with full guarantees and transparency ... The government of Spain will work in the coming days toward guaranteeing public order and protecting our democratic laws as it has always done”. Sánchez insisted that the leaders had been jailed for criminal conduct and not for their ideals and claimed that his government would ensure the complete fulfillment of the sentences.
- Pablo Iglesias, the leader of Podemos said: “With regard to the sentence, it is clear that there is consensus in the court that there was no violence, something that was evident to everyone, including the greatest adversaries of independence, But beyond the strictly legal debates, this sentence will go down in the history of Spain as a symbol of how not to deal with political conflicts in a democracy”.
- Pablo Casado, the Leader of the Opposition People's Party said: “Pedro Sanchez must affirm today that he will not pardon those convicted ... We will be at the side of the government to preserve public order and to avoid violent attitudes in the streets”.
- Roger Torrent, President of the Parliament of Catalonia and member of the pro-independence party Republican Left of Catalonia said: “Today we are all convicted, not just 12 people. This sentence is an attack on democracy and the rights of all citizens. They imprison the speaker of parliament, the vice-president, the government councillors and civil society leaders, but also our freedoms. We will turn sadness into energy. Without violence, we defend fundamental rights and freedoms. As we have always done, we will find the strength and intelligence necessary to resist the worst attacks and build scenarios of future and hope”.
- Mina Andreeva, Spokeswoman for the European Commission said: "This is and remains an internal matter for Spain, which has to be dealt inline with its constitutional order. The European Commission fully respects the Spanish constitutional order, including the decisions of the Spanish judiciary. On the protests I can only reiterate that of course, the right to demonstrate peacefully and to express one's opinion is guaranteed throughout Europe".

== Pardons and amnesty ==
In June 2021, the nine jailed leaders were pardoned. Prime Minister Pedro Sánchez said that he pardoned them because it was the best decision for Spain and Catalonia, but did not overturn their bans from holding public office. The leader of the conservative People's Party, Pablo Casado, reacted negatively, saying "During the [election] debate in 2019, I asked Sánchez several times whether he was going to pardon the prisoners and strike a deal with them, he denied it and promised to make holding illegal referendums a crime … He lied to Spaniards and he will have to answer at the ballot box.” The PP and other opposition parties planned to appeal the pardon.

In 2023, Pedro Sanchez gave the leaders an amnesty following the negotiations in the aftermath of the 2023 general election, leading to the 2023–2024 Spanish protests against the Amnesty Law.
