= Parliamentary groups of the Parliament of Catalonia =

The parliamentary groups of the Parliament of Catalonia are groups of deputies in the Parliament of Catalonia organized by political party or by coalition of parties. Their function is both political and administrative. The deputies in a group are expected to cooperate in promoting the policies of the group, while the group is allocated offices and technical support by the Board of Parliament, and may hire additional support for its members at its own expense (or that of its parent party).

At least five deputies are required to form a parliamentary group, who must all come from the same party or electoral coalition and must not all have been elected in the same constituency. Only one parliamentary group may be formed per party or coalition. Deputies who cannot join a normal parliamentary group—for example, because they have left their party, or because their party does not have at least five deputies in at least two constituencies—are organized into the "mixed group" (Catalan: Grup Mixt) for administrative purposes.

Each parliamentary group designates a spokesperson to represent the group in general matters. The Committee of Spokespersons regroups these representatives along with the president of Parliament and one of the Secretaries of the Board of Parliament to decide certain questions of a more or less technical nature, such as the designation of the appropriate committee to consider a proposed piece of legislation.

== Current Composition ==
(15th Legislature, 2024–2028) Following the regional elections held on 12 May 2024, the parliamentary groups are constituted as follows:

- Socialists' and United to Advance Parliamentary Group: 42 seats
  - Socialists' Party of Catalonia (PSC): 41 seats
  - Els Units: 1 seat
- Together's Parliamentary Group: 35 seats
  - Together for Catalonia (JxCat): 34 seats
  - Democrats of Catalonia (DC): 1 seat
- Republican Left of Catalonia's Parliamentary Group (ERC): 20 seats
- People's Party of Catalonia's Parliamentary Group (PP): 15 seats
- Vox's Parliamentary Group in Catalonia: 11 seats
- Commons Parliamentary Group: 6 seats
  - Catalunya en Comú (CatComú): 6 seats
- Mixed Group: 6 seats
  - Popular Unity Candidacy (CUP): 4 seats
  - Aliança Catalana (AC): 2 seats
