= Josep Antoni Duran i Lleida =

Spanish politician (born 1952)

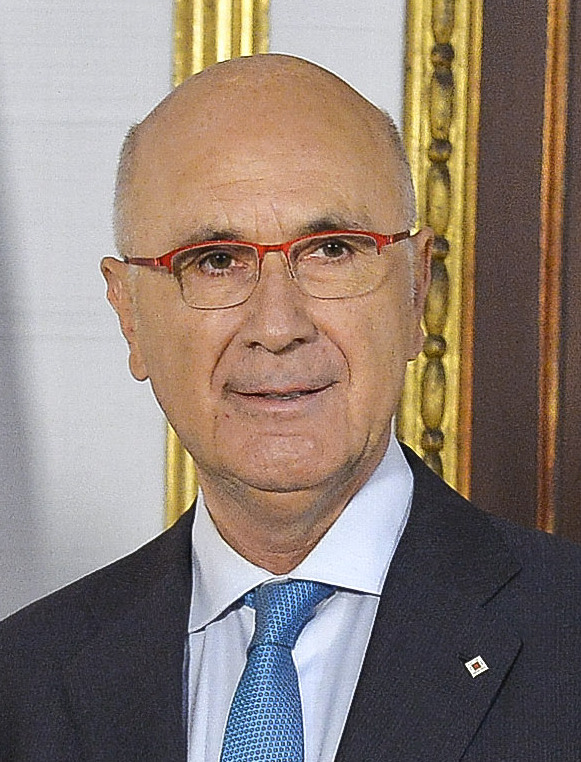

Counsellor of Governance and Institutional Relations of the Generalitat de Catalunya
- In office 29 November 1999 – 5 February 2001
- President: Jordi Pujol
- Preceded by: Xavier Pomés i Abella
- Succeeded by: Núria de Gispert

Personal details
- Born: 27 March 1952 (age 74) Alcampell, Huesca, Aragón, Spain
- Party: Democratic Union of Catalonia (CiU)
- Occupation: Politician and Lawyer

Josep Antoni Duran i Lleida (born 27 March 1952 in Alcampell, Spain) is a Spanish politician. A qualified lawyer, Duran began his political career when he was elected MP in the General Elections of Spain in 1979, representing Lleida becoming tinent d'alcalde in the municipality of Lleida.

== Biography ==
He holds a diploma in European Communities from the Diplomatic School (Ministry of Foreign Affairs and Cooperation) in Madrid and a law degree. He began his political career as deputy mayor of the City Council of Lleida. The following year, he left that position to be appointed director general of Interdepartmental Affairs for the Generalitat of Catalonia. In 1982, he was elected to the Spanish Parliament and appointed regional delegate of the Generalitat in Lleida. In 1986, he was reelected to the Spanish Parliament for the third time. From 1986 to 1987, he served as a Member of the European Parliament. In 1999, he was elected to the Parliament of Catalonia and appointed Minister of the Interior of the Generalitat (a position he held until 2001). In 2003, he was named an “illustrious son” of Alcampell; the ceremony was attended by the President of the Government of Aragon, Marcelino Iglesias.

In the General Elections in 2004, Duran became an MP for Barcelona district, as a member of Convergence and Union (CiU). Duran i Lleida has also been the president of Democratic Union of Catalonia (UDC), a political party which is part of CiU, since 1987 and also from 1982 to 1984.

== Controversies ==
In November 2000, the Pallerols scandal broke — involving the illegal financing of the UDC through European vocational training funds — and Duran stated, “If this is proven, I will resign.”

In January 2013, the “Pallerols” case was resolved when the defendants pleaded guilty; to avoid going to prison, they agreed to pay fines and serve prison terms ranging from 7 months to a year and a half.

The PP, ERC, and the entire Catalan opposition are calling on the leader of Unió to keep his word and take responsibility.

== Comments ==
In November 2003 Duran i Lleida advocated calling gay marriage (which is legal in Spain) by a different name. In January 2007 Josep Antoni adopted the Gibraltar nationality as a stand against the Spanish government policies. Years after, in March 2012 during a fierce debate with Spanish prime minister Mariano Rajoy, Duran i Lleida asked for the immediate recognition of Kosovo by Spain, and stated that the reasons for non-recognition "are not international but internal".

In October 2013, Duran challenged the then-Prime Minister Mariano Rajoy in the Congress of Deputies to provide a political response to the Catalan question, commenting that letting time pass would not only fail to resolve the problem but, on the contrary, would provoke a unilateral declaration of independence.

Political offices
Preceded by Xavier Pomés i Abella	Counsellor of Governance and Institutional Relations of Catalonia; 1999 – 2001	Succeeded by Núria de Gispert
Party political offices
Preceded by New title	General Secretary of CiU; 2001 – present	Succeeded by Incumbent
Preceded by Xavier Trias	Spokesperson of Convergence and Union in the Congress of Deputies; 2004 – present	Succeeded by Incumbent
Preceded by Concepció Ferrer i Casals	President of the Committee of Government of UDC; 1987 – present	Succeeded by Incumbent
Preceded by Joaquim Xicoy i Bassegoda	President of the Committee of Government of UDC; 1982 – 1984	Succeeded by Concepció Ferrer i Casals
