= Plenary Assembly of the Parliament of Catalonia =

The Plenary Assembly of the Parliament of Catalonia (Catalan: Ple del Parlament) is the highest body of the Parliament of Catalonia, competent to decide any question within the remit of the Parliament as governed by the Statute of Autonomy of Catalonia. For the plenary assembly to be valid, at least one-half of the deputies (currently 68 out of a total of 135) must be present at the seat of the Parliament, the Palau del Parlament in Ciutadella Park, Barcelona.

The plenary assembly is convoked by the President of the Parliament, either by his or her own initiative or on the request of at least three parliamentary groups or one-fifth of the deputies (currently 27 out of a total of 135). Extraordinary sessions may also be convoked on the request of the President of the Generalitat (who is also head of government).

The plenary assembly is chaired by the President of the Parliament, or by one of the Vice-Presidents, according to a published agenda. Sessions are public except in exceptional circumstances.

Plenary assemblies are relatively rare, one or two a month, with most of the work of the Parliament taking place in commissions.

== See also ==
- Plenary Assembly of the Seventh legislature of the Parliament of Catalonia
