= Josep Maria Vallès =

Spanish politician

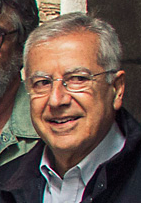
- Vallès in 2015

Minister of Justice of the Generalitat de Catalunya
- In office 17 December 2003 – 29 November 2006
- President: Pasqual Maragall
- Preceded by: Núria de Gispert
- Succeeded by: Montserrat Tura

Personal details
- Born: July 1940 (age 85) Barcelona
- Party: CpC (PSC)

Josep Maria Vallès i Casadevall (born July 1940 in Barcelona) is a Spanish academic and politician.

== Career ==
Vallès studied law (UB), Political Science (IEP, in Paris) and Business Management (ESADE, Barcelona). He is Emeritus Professor in Political Science and Administration in the Universitat Autònoma de Barcelona, where he was Dean of the Faculty of Political Sciences and Sociology (1985–1990) and Rector (Vice-Chancellor) (1990–1994). Vallès has been President of the Spanish Association of Political Science and Administration (AECPA) and member of the Executive Board of the European Consortium for Political Research (ECPR). His research interests have been electoral systems and behaviour, local government and public policy. Vallès was elected to the Parliament of Catalonia in 1999 and re-elected in 2003, as Barcelona candidate for Ciutadans pel Canvi (CpC), a civic association. In 2003, he was appointed Minister of Justice in the Catalan Government presided by Pasqual Maragall. Vallès is married and has two sons (Oriol and Màrius).

Political offices
Preceded by Núria de Gispert; As Minister of Justice and Home Affairs	Minister of Justice of the Generalitat de Catalunya; 2003–2006	Succeeded by Montserrat Tura
Party political offices
Preceded by New title	President of CpC; 1999–2007	Succeeded by Carme Valls-Llobet
