= Joan Saura =

Spanish politician

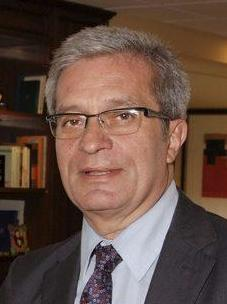

Minister of Home Affairs, Institutional Relations and Participation of the Generalitat de Catalunya
- In office 29 November 2006 – 29 December 2010
- Preceded by: Montserrat Tura and Joan Saura i Laporta
- Succeeded by: Felip Puig (as Minister of Home Affairs); Joana Ortega (as Vice President and Minister of Governance and Institutional Relations)
- Constituency: Province of Barcelona

Minister of Institutional Relations and Participation of the Generalitat de Catalunya
- In office 17 December 2003 – 29 November 2006
- Preceded by: Josep Maria Pelegrí i Aixut
- Succeeded by: Himself; As Minister of Home Affairs, Institutional Relations and Participation

Spanish Senator for Catalonia
- In office 9 February 2011 – 26 October 2015

Member of the Parliament of Catalonia for the Province of Barcelona
- In office 29 May 1988 – 5 October 2010

Member of the Congress of Deputies
- In office 3 March 1996 – 14 March 2004

Personal details
- Born: 24 April 1950 (age 75) Barcelona, Spain
- Party: Initiative for Catalonia Greens

Joan Saura i Laporta is a Spanish former politician in Catalonia for Initiative for Catalonia Greens (ICV). He was born in Barcelona, Catalonia, in 1950. He studied at the Escola d'Enginyeria Tècnica (Technical Engineering School), where he specialized in Industrial Chemistry. In the beginning, he was devoted to the trade union and the neighbourhood: he enrolled into the Workers' Commissions (CCOO) in 1973, while he was working for the electrics company FECSA, and cofounded the La Florida Neighbourhood Association, in L'Hospitalet de Llobregat, 1974.

== Municipal policy ==
He became town councillor in L'Hospitalet de Llobregat for the Unified Socialist Party of Catalonia (PSUC) in the first democratic local elections in 1979, where he participated in the formation of the government, and remained a councillor until 1991.

He also chaired (from 1983 to 1987) the Public Transport commission in Barcelona.

== Parliament of Catalonia ==
He was elected for the third and fourth Legislatures (1988 to 1995) as deputy for Barcelona in the Catalan Parliament for the Iniciativa per Catalunya Verds (ICV) party. He was the spokesperson of his party's group and became its president in 1993.

In this Parliament he has held several positions, including membership in the Economy, Finances and Budget commission, in the Industry commission, Territorial Politics as well as various others.

== Congress of the Deputies ==
On 3 March 1996 he was elected to the Spanish Congress of Deputies representing Barcelona Province and was re-elected at the subsequent election on 12 March 2000, where he was involved in several Parliamentary Commissions (such as Environment and Defense).

As a deputy, Joan Saura promoted several initiatives, such as a rise in the minimum wage, a fight against workplace abuses by employers, same-sex marriage and the Tobin tax. Additionally, he was strongly opposed to other ones: the Plan Hidrológico Nacional (PHN), the reform of the labour market law, the quality in teaching law, the political parties' law, the tax reform, the Prestige affair and the 2003 invasion of Iraq.

== President of ICV ==
Within ICV, he served as vice-president from 1993 as well as the head of political relations with Spain.

At the 6th Assembly of the party in November 2000, he was elected as ICV President. In June 2002 the party formed an electoral pact with United Left, and Els Verds-Esquerra Ecologista.

== A Generalitat candidate ==
On 25 May 2002 he was chosen as the candidate for the presidency of the Generalitat de Catalunya by the ICV-EUiA coalition. For that reason, he set up in 2002 a Participative Process and the "What do you think?" campaign, to define the axis of the party's program based on civil participation.

In the elections of 2003, his party won 9 seats in the Catalan Parliament and he, after few months of negotiation, became Minister of Institutional Relations and Participation.

Political offices
Preceded by Josep Maria Pelegrí i Aixut (as Minister of Governance and Institutional Relations)	Minister of Institutional Relations and Participation; 2003 – 2006	Succeeded by Joan Saura i Laporta (as Minister of Home Affairs, Institutional Relations and Participation)
Preceded by Montserrat Tura (as Minister of Home Affairs) and Joan Saura i Laporta (as Minister of Institutional Relations and Participation)	Minister of Home Affairs, Institutional Relations and Participation; 2006 – 2010	Succeeded by Felip Puig (as Minister of Home Affairs); Joana Ortega (as Vice President and Minister of Governance and Institutional Relations)
Party political offices
Preceded by Rafael Ribó i Massó	President of ICV; 2000 – present	Succeeded by Incumbent
