= Anna Simó =

Spanish politician

The Honourable Anna Simó
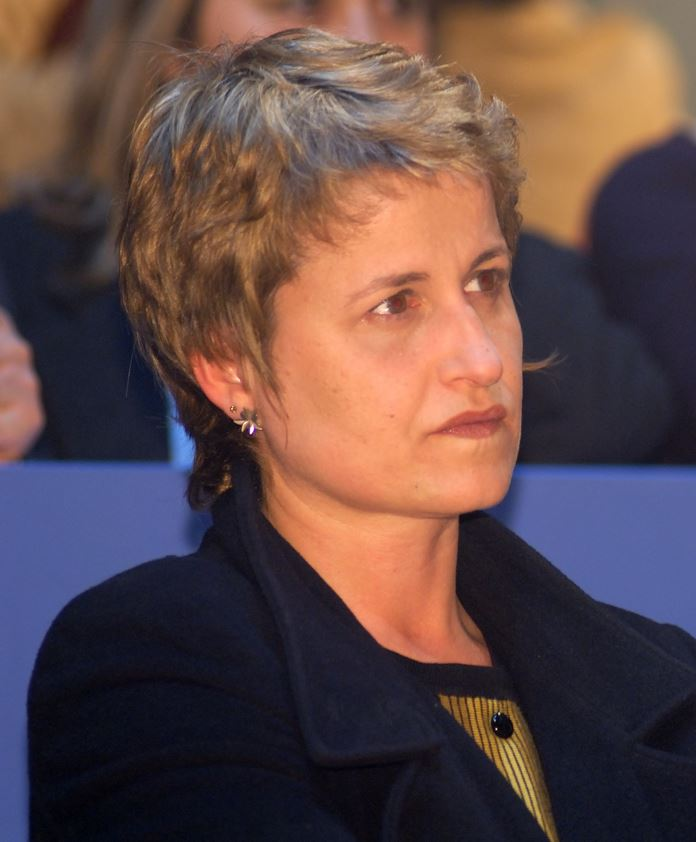
- Simó in 2008

Minister of Education of Catalonia
- In office 12 June 2023 – 12 August 2024
- President: Pere Aragonès
- Preceded by: Josep Gonzàlez Cambray
- Succeeded by: Esther Niubó

First Secretary of the Parliament of Catalonia
- In office 26 October 2015 – 29 October 2017
- Preceded by: Pere Navarro
- Succeeded by: Eusebi Campdepedrós

Minister of Social Welfare and Family Affairs of Catalonia
- In office 2003–2006
- Preceded by: Irene Rigau
- Succeeded by: Carme Figueras

Personal details
- Born: 26 July 1968 (age 57) Els Alamús, Spain
- Party: ERC

Anna Simó i Castelló (born 26 July 1968) is a Spanish Catalan politician. A member of the Republican Left of Catalonia (ERC), she became the Minister of Social Welfare and Family Affairs of the Generalitat de Catalunya in 2003 as part of the first "Tripartite" coalition government formed by the Socialists' Party of Catalonia, ERC and Initiative for Catalonia Greens, a position she held until ERC's ministers were removed from the government in May 2006.

== Education and professional background ==
Anna Simó earned an undergraduate degree in Catalan philology from the University of Barcelona in 1991 and went on to complete a post-degree program in language planning at the same university in 1992.

From 1990 to 2003, she worked for the Linguistic Normalisation Consortium (Consorci per a la normalització lingüística), including a stint as the head of the Linguistic Normalisation Center in the Ciutat Vella district of Barcelona.

== Civic background ==
She is a member of several associations, including Ca la Dona (Woman's House), the Centre Catòlic de L'Hospitalet (Catholic Center of L'Hospitalet) and the Centre d’Estudis de L'Hospitalet (L'Hospitalet Studies Center). She has also been affiliated with the CONC, a Catalan union confederated with the CCOO, since 1990, and served on the works council of the Linguistic Normalisation Consortium.

== Political career ==
A member of the Republican Left of Catalonia since 1990, Simó was president of the local branch of ERC in L'Hospitalet de Llobregat from 1996 to 2002. She has been a member of the ERC's national council since 1994 and of its national executive council since 1998, serving as the party's national secretary for social policy from 2001 to 2004.

Simó was elected to the city council of l'Hospitalet in May 2003 and named to the local council of the Barcelonès comarca, resigning both posts when she entered the Catalan government later that year.

She was elected to the Catalan parliament in 2006 and was the spokeswoman for the party's parliamentary group, a position she held since 2008. Simó was named first secretary of the Parliament on 26 October 2015 until the dissolution of the parliament by the application of Article 155 on 27 October 2017.

== Catalan independence crisis and judicial case ==
On 27 October 2017 the Catalan Parliament declared independence in a vote boycotted by opposition MPs. Almost immediately the Senate of Spain invoked article 155 of the constitution, dismissing Puigdemont and the Catalan government and imposing direct rule on Catalonia. The following day Spanish Prime Minister Mariano Rajoy dissolved the Catalan Parliament and called for fresh regional elections on 21 December 2017.

On 30 October 2017 Spanish Attorney General José Manuel Maza laid charges of rebellion, sedition and misuse of public funds at the Supreme Court against Corominas and five other members of the Board of the Parliament of Catalonia (Ramona Barrufet, Carme Forcadell, Lluís Guinó, Joan Josep Nuet and Lluís Corominas). Corominas was charged despite not being a member of the board at the time of the declaration of independence. The charges carried maximum sentences of 30, 15 and 6 years in prison respectively.

Simó and the other members of the board appeared before Supreme Court judge Pablo Llarena on 9 November 2017. Nuet was released without any precautionary measures but the other five had to pay bail (€100,000 for Forcadell, €25,000 each for Barrufet, Corominas, Guinó and Simó), surrender their passport and present themselves at a court weekly. The bail bonds were paid by the Catalan National Assembly.

After a four-month judicial investigation into the referendum and declaration of independence Supreme Court judge Pablo Llarena issued a 70-page ruling on 23 March 2018 in which he ordered that 25 of the 28 Catalan politicians and activists under investigation be tried for rebellion, embezzlement or disobedience. Corominas was charged with disobeying an order of the Constitutional Court (article 410 of the criminal code).

A pre-trial hearing commenced on 18 December 2018 at the Supreme Court at which defence lawyers argued that the court was not competent to hear charges of rebellion or disobedience and that it should be heard at the High Court of Justice of Catalonia. On 27 December 2018 the Supreme Court ruled that, although they were competent to hear all the charges, the six defendants charged only with disobedience (Barrufet, Mireia Boya, Corominas, Guinó, Nuet and Simó) would be tried at the High Court of Justice of Catalonia.

In 2019, she was one of the defendants in the Trial of Catalonia independence leaders.

Preceded by Irene Rigau	Minister of Social Welfare and Family Affairs; 2003–2006	Succeeded by Carme Figueras
