= Heribert Barrera =

Spanish politician (1917–2011)

Heribert Barrera i Costa
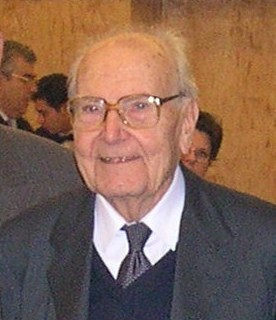

7th Speaker of the Parliament of Catalonia
- In office 10 April 1980 – 17 May 1984
- Preceded by: Francesc Farreras i Duran
- Succeeded by: Miquel Coll i Alentorn

Member of the Parliament of Catalonia
- In office 10 April 1980 – 4 April 1988

Member of the Congress of Deputies
- In office 1 July 1977 – 9 April 1980

Personal details
- Born: Heribert Barrera i Costa; 6 July 1917 Barcelona, Catalonia, Spain
- Died: 27 August 2011 (aged 94) Barcelona, Catalonia, Spain
- Party: Republican Left of Catalonia
- Education: University of Montpellier; Sorbonne
- Occupation: Politician
- Profession: Chemist

Heribert Barrera i Costa (6 July 1917 – 27 August 2011) was a Catalan politician and chemist. A member of the Republican Left of Catalonia (Esquerra Republicana de Catalunya), he was the first President of the Parliament of Catalonia following the restoration of the Catalan institutions after Franco's dictatorship, serving from 1980 to 1984 (the seventh overall since its original foundation).

He was the son of Martí Barrera i Maresma, a deputy in the Parliament of Catalonia during the Second Republic and minister of the Generalitat de Catalunya.

Throughout his life, Barrera was committed to the cause of the Catalan Republic and the defense of Catalonia's national rights and civil liberties. He became a symbol of the 20th-century Catalan independence movement.

== Political career ==
=== Republican youth ===
Heribert Barrera began his political career in 1934 when he joined the Federació Nacional d'Estudiants de Catalunya (National Federation of Catalan Students) and the Bloc Escolar Nacionalista (Nationalist School Bloc). The following year, he became a member of the youth wing of Republican Left of Catalonia.

In late 1937, during the Spanish Civil War, he volunteered for the Republican Army and served as an artillery soldier on the Aragon front and the Segre front. In 1939, he went into exile, ending up in the Argelès-sur-Mer internment camp, where he remained for a week until he was rescued through the intervention of Pere Bosch-Gimpera. He then moved to Narbonne, where he stayed for a month, and afterwards to Montpellier.

While in exile, he is believed to have participated in the French resistance by collaborating with the Louis Brun network, although no documentary evidence confirms this. In 1946, he became Secretary General of the Federació Nacional d'Estudiants de Catalunya.

In 1941, his mother, Purificació Costa i Lloret, and his sisters Angelina and Rosa Maria returned to Barcelona without being harassed. In 1949, he married Renée Mestrallet.

In 1952, he returned to Catalonia and assumed leadership of the underground Republican Left of Catalonia, which had been severely weakened following the arrests of 1946 and 1947. At the time, the party was loosely organized around Miquel Ferrer, Manuel Juliachs, Pere Puig, Pau Ris, Joan Rodríguez, Jaume Serra, and Josep Subirats.

=== The Transition ===
After returning to Catalonia in 1952, by 1968 he was concerned about the predominant role of the PSUC and the MSC in the anti-Francoist struggle. Like many other left-wing politicians, he joined the Socialist and Democratic Reorganization of Catalonia led by Josep Pallach in November 1974, although he eventually abandoned the project due to reluctance within the bases of his party, ERC. ERC elected him secretary general in 1976, a position he would renew until 1987.

Since the party had not been legalized by the Suárez government, ERC had to run in the first democratic elections of 1977 in an unusual coalition with the Party of Labour of Spain and some members of the National Front of Catalonia, resulting in Barrera becoming a deputy in the Spanish Congress of Deputies.

As a participant in the resulting Assembly of Parliamentarians, Barrera rejected any pact with the Spanish government unless the 1932 Statute of Catalonia was restored and the republican government in exile of Josep Tarradellas was returned; a position he had defended years earlier. Later, he publicly disagreed with the draft of the new 1979 Statute, although he ultimately voted in favor of it.

== Professional career ==
Barrera studied chemistry at the University of Barcelona. In 1939, when exiled to France, he only received recognition for his high school studies and had to start university studies again, obtaining degrees in Mathematics and Chemical engineering at the University of Montpellier, and later earned a doctorate in Physics at the Sorbonne (Paris). Between 1948 and 1951, he was a professor at the University of Montpellier. He was an assistant professor and lecturer of electrochemistry at the Faculty of Sciences; he was also a research associate at the French National Centre for Scientific Research and a postdoctoral fellow at the University of New Hampshire.

In 1952, upon returning to Catalonia, he refused to sign the obligatory Principios Fundamentales del Movimiento, which prevented him from teaching at the University of Barcelona, and worked in the chemical industry until 1959, when he received a postdoctoral fellowship and studied and researched for a year at the University of New Hampshire.

He returned to Catalonia in 1968 to work as a chemistry professor at the Autonomous University of Barcelona, and in 1969 returned to the United States to work at an American engineering firm. He was hired as a professor of Inorganic chemistry at the UAB in 1970, where he worked until his retirement in 1984.

Barrera authored numerous scientific articles in international journals as well as political articles in Catalan and international press. In 1949, he was awarded the Prat de la Riba Prize of the Institute for Catalan Studies for his work New contributions to the synthesis of aryl aliphatic acids and the theory of intramolecular acylation.

He was responsible for the theoretical chemistry section of the Gran Enciclopèdia Catalana. He was president of the Catalan Society of Physical, Chemical and Mathematical Sciences from 1976 to 1978, and president of the science section of the Institute for Catalan Studies, of which he later became emeritus member. He was also a member of foreign scientific institutions such as the Chemical Society of France and the American Chemical Society.

== Civic career ==
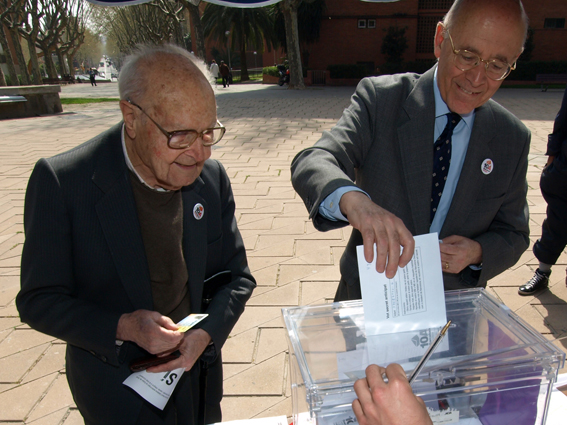
Presidents Barrera and Rigol voting in Nou Barris during the Catalan independence referendums in 2011.

He had a very active role in Catalan society: Between 1977 and 1979, Barrera was a member of the Catalan Council of the European Movement. He was president of the Club of Friends of UNESCO of Barcelona, president (1989–1997) and honorary president of the Ateneu Barcelonès, and president of the Association of Former Deputies to the Parliament of Catalonia (1997–2003). In his later years, he was a member of the advisory council of Òmnium Cultural. In July 2012, he was posthumously awarded the Gold Medal of the Barcelona City Council. On 18 September 2012, he was posthumously awarded the Gold Medal of the Generalitat of Catalonia.

He died on 27 August 2011 at the Hospital de Barcelona and was buried at the Reus Cemetery.

=== Controversies ===
Towards the end of his public life, Barrera made several controversial public statements, which some perceived as xenophobic. He expressed support for the sterilization of people with mental disabilities of genetic origin, and warned of the dangers of immigration and the growing presence of foreigners in Catalonia.

In 2012, the Barcelona City Council, governed by Xavier Trias, awarded him the city's Gold Medal with the support of the PSC and ICV. However, on 23 September 2020, the PSC, Barcelona en Comú, PP, and Ciutadans voted to revoke the honor. The plenary session in which the revocation was decided had to be repeated because Manuel Valls had mistakenly proposed the withdrawal using the name "Heribert Barrera i López" instead of "Heribert Barrera i Costa".

== Personal archive ==
The documentary archive of the former President of the Parliament of Catalonia was acquired by the Department of Culture and deposited at the National Archive of Catalonia in 2022. According to the Department, it was a delicate operation because the archive had been circulating in private markets. The archive occupies 1.2 meters in volume and mainly consists of Barrera's correspondence between 1940 and 1980. It includes 308 letters from 67 correspondents, 111 photographs, 32 monographs, and 57 copies of magazines published in exile.

== See also ==
- President of the Parliament of Catalonia
- President of the Republican Left of Catalonia
- National Conference for Self-Determination

== Bibliography ==
- Mestre i Campi, Jesús (director) (1998). Diccionari d'Història de Catalunya (in Catalan). Edicions 62. p. 106. ISBN 84-297-3521-6. "Entry: "Barrera i Maresma, Martí""
- Sinca, Genís (2006). Heribert Barrera, l'últim republicà. Biografies (in Catalan). Columna Edicions. p. 300. ISBN 978-84-6640-711-3.
- Vila, Enric (2001). Què pensa Heribert Barrera (in Catalan). Barcelona: Edicions Proa. p. 176. ISBN 978-84-8437-146-5.
