= List of ministers of institutional relations and participation of Catalonia =

This is a list of ministers of institutional relations and participation of Catalonia

1. Joan Saura (ICV) 2003-2006
