= Lluís Corominas =

Spanish lawyer and politician

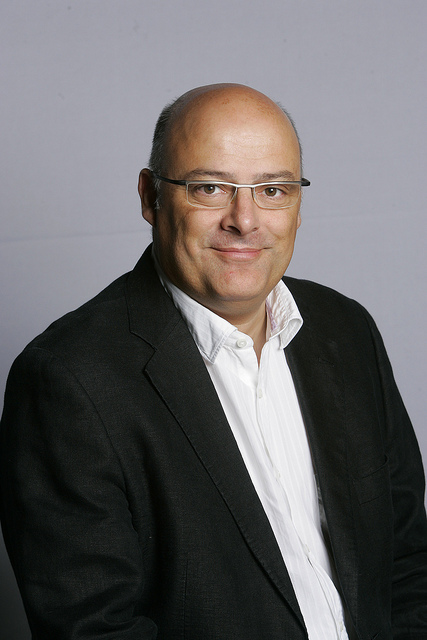
- Corominas in July 2010

First Vice-President of the Parliament of Catalonia
- In office 16 December 2010 – 2 October 2012
- Preceded by: Higini Clotas i Cierco
- Succeeded by: Anna Simó
- In office 26 October 2015 – 25 July 2017
- Preceded by: Anna Simó
- Succeeded by: Lluís Guinó i Subirós

Second Vice-President of the Parliament of Catalonia
- In office 30 September 2008 – 5 October 2010
- Preceded by: Ramon Camp i Batalla
- Succeeded by: Higini Clotas i Cierco
- In office 17 December 2012 – 4 August 2015
- Preceded by: Higini Clotas i Cierco
- Succeeded by: José María Espejo-Saavedra Conesa

Member of the Parliament of Catalonia
- In office 5 December 2003 – 28 October 2017
- Constituency: Barcelona

Mayor of Castellar del Vallès
- In office 29 September 1992 – 2 June 2004
- Preceded by: Albert Antonell i Ribatallada
- Succeeded by: Montserrat Gatell Pérez

Member of Castellar del Vallès Municipal Council
- In office 1991–2004

Personal details
- Born: Lluís Maria Corominas i Díaz; 14 February 1963 (age 63) Castellar del Vallès, Catalonia, Spain
- Citizenship: Spanish
- Party: Catalan European Democratic Party
- Education: Autonomous University of Barcelona
- Occupation: Lawyer
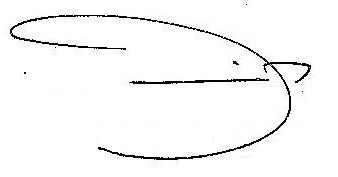
- Signature

Lluís Maria Corominas i Díaz (born 14 February 1963) is a Catalan lawyer, politician and a former member of the Parliament of Catalonia. He is currently awaiting trial on charges of disobedience for his role in the Catalan declaration of independence.

== Early life ==
Corominas was born on 14 February 1963 in Castellar del Vallès, Catalonia. He has a degree in law from the Autonomous University of Barcelona and a diploma in public administration management from ESADE.

== Career ==
Corominas has worked as a lawyer for more than ten years.

Corominas contested the 1991 local elections as a Convergence and Union (CiU) electoral alliance candidate in Castellar del Vallès and was elected. He was re-elected at the 1995, 1999 and 2003 local elections. He was mayor of Castellar del Vallès between 1992 and 2004 and vice-president of Vallès Occidental County Council from 1996 to 2003. Corominas was vice-president of Fons Català de Cooperació al Desenvolupament (Catalan Fund for Development Cooperation) and a national councillor of the Associació Catalana de Municipis (Catalan Association of Municipalities). He has also been vice-president of the Board of Trustees of the Fundación Ramon Trias Fargas (Ramon Trias Fargas Foundation).

Corominas was secretary of the Democratic Convergence of Catalonia (CDC) from 2000 to 2004. He has been a member of the national executive committees of the CDC and Convergence and Union (CiU).

Corominas contested the 2003 regional election as a CiU candidate in the Province of Barcelona and was elected to the Parliament of Catalonia. He was re-elected at the 2006, 2010, 2012 and 2015 regional elections.

Corominas was elected Second Vice-President of the Parliament of Catalonia in September 2008, replacing Ramon Camp i Batalla. He was elected First Vice-President of the Parliament of Catalonia in December 2010. In December 2012 he was elected Second Vice-President of the Parliament of Catalonia. He was elected First Vice-President of the Parliament of Catalonia in October 2015. In July 2017 he became president of the Junts pel Sí group in parliament, replacing Jordi Turull.

=== Catalan independence crisis ===
In June 2017, President of Catalonia Carles Puigdemont announced that a referendum on Catalan independence would be held on 1 October 2017. The Catalan Parliament passed legislation on 6 September 2017 authorising the referendum which would be binding and based on a simple majority without a minimum threshold. The following day Constitutional Court of Spain suspended the legislation, blocking the referendum. The Spanish government put into effect Operation Anubis in order to disrupt the organisation of the referendum and arrested Catalan government officials. Despite this the referendum went ahead though it was boycotted by unionists and turnout was only 43%. 92% of those who voted supported independence. Around 900 people were injured as the Spanish police used violence to try to prevent voting in the referendum.

On 27 October 2017 the Catalan Parliament declared independence in a vote boycotted by opposition MPs. Almost immediately the Senate of Spain invoked article 155 of the constitution, dismissing Puigdemont and the Catalan government and imposing direct rule on Catalonia. The following day Spanish Prime Minister Mariano Rajoy dissolved the Catalan Parliament and called for fresh regional elections on 21 December 2017.

On 30 October 2017 Spanish Attorney General José Manuel Maza laid charges of rebellion, sedition and misuse of public funds at the Supreme Court against Corominas and five other members of the Board of the Parliament of Catalonia (Ramona Barrufet, Carme Forcadell, Lluís Guinó, Joan Josep Nuet and Anna Simó). Corominas was charged despite not being a member of the board at the time of the declaration of independence. The charges carried maximum sentences of 30, 15 and 6 years in prison respectively.

Corominas and the other members of the board appeared before Supreme Court judge Pablo Llarena on 9 November 2017. Nuet was released without any precautionary measures but the other five had to pay bail (€100,000 for Forcadell, €25,000 each for Barrufet, Corominas, Guinó and Simó), surrender their passport and present themselves at a court weekly. The bail bonds were paid by the Catalan National Assembly.

After a four-month judicial investigation into the referendum and declaration of independence Supreme Court judge Pablo Llarena issued a 70-page ruling on 23 March 2018 in which he ordered that 25 of the 28 Catalan politicians and activists under investigation be tried for rebellion, embezzlement or disobedience. Corominas was charged with disobeying an order of the Constitutional Court (article 410 of the criminal code).

A pre-trial hearing commenced on 18 December 2018 at the Supreme Court at which defence lawyers argued that the court was not competent to hear charges of rebellion or disobedience and that it should be heard at the High Court of Justice of Catalonia. On 27 December 2018 the Supreme Court ruled that, although they were competent to hear all the charges, the six defendants charged only with disobedience (Barrufet, Mireia Boya, Corominas, Guinó, Nuet and Simó) would be tried at the High Court of Justice of Catalonia.

== Personal life ==
Corominas is married and has two daughters. He was a basketball player and has coached a women's basketball team in Castellar.

== Electoral history ==
Electoral history of Lluís Corominas
Election	Constituency	Party	Alliance	No.	Result
1991 local	Castellar del Vallès	Democratic Convergence of Catalonia	Convergence and Union		Elected
1995 local	Castellar del Vallès	Democratic Convergence of Catalonia	Convergence and Union		Elected
1999 local	Castellar del Vallès	Democratic Convergence of Catalonia	Convergence and Union	1	Elected
2003 local	Castellar del Vallès	Democratic Convergence of Catalonia	Convergence and Union	1	Elected
2003 regional	Province of Barcelona	Democratic Convergence of Catalonia	Convergence and Union	9	Elected
2006 regional	Province of Barcelona	Democratic Convergence of Catalonia	Convergence and Union	6	Elected
2010 regional	Province of Barcelona	Democratic Convergence of Catalonia	Convergence and Union	11	Elected
2012 regional	Province of Barcelona	Democratic Convergence of Catalonia	Convergence and Union	13	Elected
2015 regional	Province of Barcelona	Democratic Convergence of Catalonia	Junts pel Sí	17	Elected
