= Jordi Miralles =

Spanish politician and mail carrier

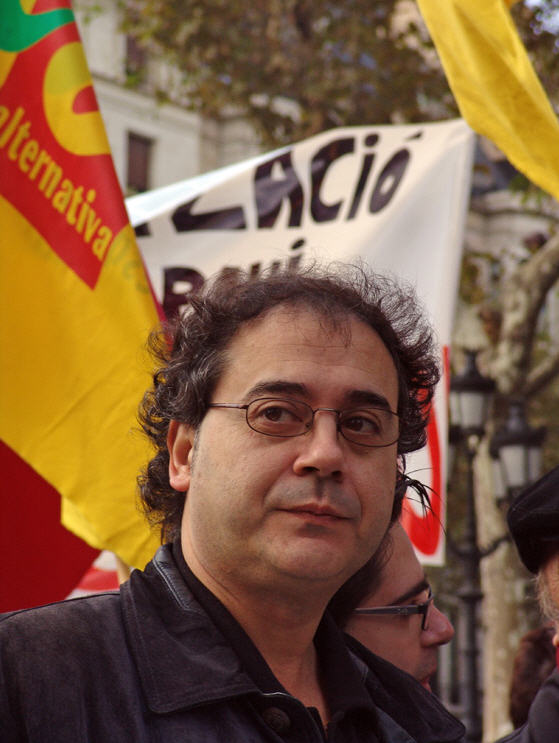

Jordi Miralles i Conte (27 April 1962 – 14 October 2015) was a Spanish politician.

He was born in Barcelona and represented the district in the Parliament of Catalonia from 2003 to 2012. He was a member of the United and Alternative Left and became party's coordinator general three years prior to his term in parliament. Miralles stepped down from both positions in the same year. He served on the federal presidency of the United Left coalition from 2002 to 2012, the executive committee of the Party of the Communists of Catalonia, and the Council of Presidents of the European United Left–Nordic Green Left. Miralles died in Bellvitge of meningitis in 2015, aged 53.
