= Montserrat Tura =

Spanish politician

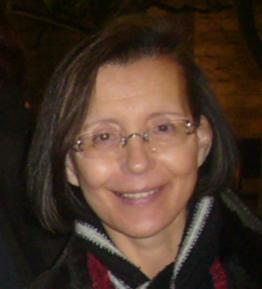

Minister of Justice of the Generalitat de Catalunya
- In office November 29, 2006 – December 29, 2010
- President: José Montilla
- Preceded by: Josep Maria Vallès
- Succeeded by: Pilar Fernández i Bozal

Minister of Home Affairs of the Generalitat de Catalunya
- In office December 17, 2003 – November 29, 2006
- President: Pasqual Maragall
- Preceded by: Núria de Gispert
- Succeeded by: Joan Saura

Mayoress of Mollet del Vallès
- In office June 30, 1987 – December 21, 2003
- Preceded by: Carme Coll i Truyol
- Succeeded by: Josep Monràs i Galindo

Personal details
- Born: November 6, 1954 (age 71) Mollet del Vallès (Province of Barcelona)
- Party: PSC

Montserrat Tura (born 6 November 1954) is a Spanish politician and Member of the Parliament of Catalonia. From 29 November 2006 to 29 December 2010, she had served as Minister of Justice of Catalonia. She is considered one of the most prominent members of the Catalanist wing of the Socialists' Party of Catalonia. She is married with two daughters.

== Life ==
She was born in Mollet del Vallès (Province of Barcelona) into a country family strongly defined by its political activity in support of liberty, democracy and Catalanism. Her uncle was member of the Republican Left of Catalonia and mayor of the town during the Second Republic; her great grandfather was also mayor in the 1910s, and prominent member of the Catalan Regionalist League. The cousin of her father, Jordi Solé Tura, was a prominent Catalan Communist politician.

She was linked to anti-Francoist organisations from a very early age. Clandestinely active since she was sixteen and in the first years of the transition after Franco's death, she took part in university movements and in a number of environmentalist and leftist groups.

After graduating with degrees in Medicine and Surgery from the University of Barcelona, she combined medical practice with her specialisation in health care management and economics. In 1981, she started practicing at Palamós Hospital, and was appointed General Director the following year. During her time as Medical Director and General Director, she also oversaw the planning and construction of a new hospital.

Except for the time she worked in Palamós, Tura has always lived in Mollet.

== Political background ==
In 1979, she joined the Socialists' Party of Catalonia (the Catalan sister party of the Spanish Socialist Workers' Party) and has been a member of the national leadership since 1990.

She was Mayoress of Mollet from 30 June 1987 to 21 December 2003, a time when the city underwent an extraordinary transformation from both the urban and sociocultural point of view. It was an Olympic site in the 1992 Barcelona Games and commemorated its Millennium in 1993. Some flagship projects during her office are the Museu Municipal Joan Abelló, the Parc dels Colors, by architect Enric Miralles, and the new Town Hall.

During this time, she also held the following posts:

- County Councillor for Vallès Oriental (1988–1991)
- President of the Consortium for the Defence of the Besòs River Basin (1993–1995)
- Member of the Executive Committee of the Federation of Municipalities of Catalonia (FMC)
- President of the Group of Socialist and Progressive Local Representatives of Catalonia (1993–1995)
- President of the various independent municipal agencies
- President of the Private Foundation for Environmental Studies of Mollet del Vallès, in charge of managing the Universitat Politècnica de Catalunya for the environment, a college attached to the Universitat Autònoma de Barcelona.

She has the following responsibilities in her party:

- President of the Local Group of Mollet
- Member of the National Executive Committee of the Socialists' Party of Catalonia (PSC)
- National Secretary for the Environment

She was elected Member of the Catalan Parliament in the 1995 regional elections and re-elected in 1999 and 2003. As an MP, she has been on the Regional Policy, Economy, Finances and Budgets committees, and she was Vice President of the Organisation and Administration of the Regional Assembly and Local Government committee. In the sixth term of office, she was spokesperson for the Socialists - Citizens for Change parliamentary group and part of its management committee. In January 2004, she resigned her seat.

On January 12, 2010, Tura announced she intended to run for mayor of Barcelona, facing in the PSC's primaries the incumbent mayor Jordi Hereu.

Political offices
Preceded by Josep Maria Vallès	Minister of Justice; 2006 – 2010	Succeeded by Pilar Fernández i Bozal
Preceded by Núria de Gispert (as Minister of Justice and Home Affairs)	Minister of Home Affairs; 2003 – 2006	Succeeded by Joan Saura (as Minister of Home Affairs, Institutional Relations and Participation)
Preceded by Carme Coll i Truyol	Mayoress of Mollet del Vallès; 1987 – 2003	Succeeded by Josep Monràs i Galindo
