= Ernest Benach =

Spanish politician

Ernest Benach i Pasqual
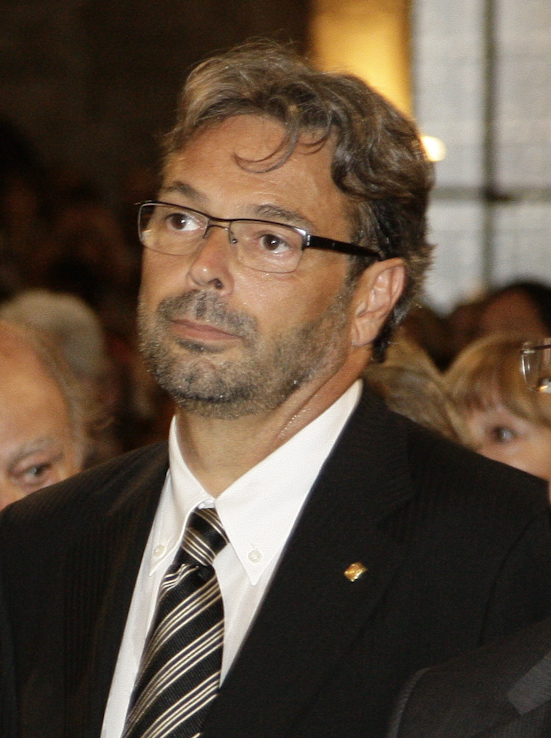
- Benach in 2009

12th President of Catalan Parliament
- In office 17 December 2003 – 16 December 2010
- Preceded by: Joan Rigol
- Succeeded by: Núria de Gispert

Personal details
- Born: 12 November 1959 (age 66) Reus (Baix Camp)
- Party: ERC
- Spouse: Àngels
- Children: Pol Benach (boy); Ona Benach (girl); Mar Benach (girl)

Ernest Benach i Pasqual (Catalan pronunciation: [əɾˈnest bəˈnak]; born Reus, Baix Camp, 12 November 1959) was the President of the Catalan Parliament from 2003 to 2010. He is a member of the Catalan independentist party Republican Left of Catalonia (ERC).

== Education and professional background ==
Benach worked for the Catalan Generalitat as a sweeper after he left university. He has also co-written República catalana (Catalan Republic) and Educar en política (Teaching in politics).

== Civic background ==
Head of the La Mulassa, a Boy Scout association of Reus (1981–1986) and president (1991–1994) and cap de colla (head of group) of the Colla castellera Xiquets de Reus (an association of castellers), he is also a member of the Pedagogy section of the Reading Center of Reus.

== Political background ==
He was member of Left Nationalists (NE) from 1979 to 1986. In 1987 he joined the ERC, where he served as general vice-secretary of institutional politics.

== Institutional background ==
He has been a deputy in the Catalan Parliament since 1992, where he served as second secretary of the board (1999–2003) and president. He was also president of the Conference of European Regional Legislative Assemblies from October 2004 to October 2005.

He was also a member of the city council of Reus, the city where he was born, from 1987 to 2001, where he held several positions.

Political offices
Preceded by Joan Rigol	President of the Parliament of Catalonia; 2003 – 2010	Succeeded by Núria de Gispert
