= Ramona Barrufet i Santacana =

Spanish politician

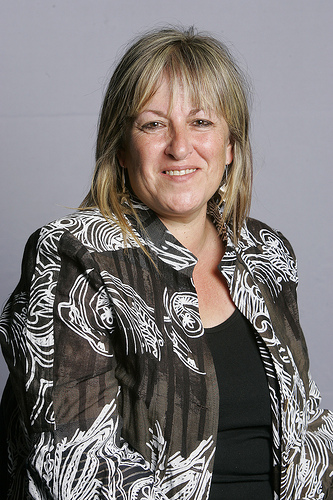

Deputy in the Parliament of Catalonia
- In office 2010–2017

Fourth Secretary of the Parliament of Catalonia
- In office 2015–2017

Personal details
- Born: 1959 (age 66–67) Juneda, Garrigues, Spain
- Party: Democratic Convergence of Catalonia (CDC)
- Other political affiliations: Together for Yes (Junts pel Sí)
- Education: University of Lleida
- Occupation: Teacher, politician

Ramona Barrufet i Santacana (born 1959) is a Spanish Catalan teacher and politician who has been a deputy in the Parliament of Catalonia for the IX, X and XI legislatures and has been the Fourth Secretary on the Parliament's Board since 2015 until 2017. She is a member of the Democratic Convergence of Catalonia party (CDC).

== Career ==
Born in Juneda, Garriges, in 1959, Ramona Barrufet i Santacana is a graduate of the School of Teaching at the University of Lleida and has worked as a teacher of music and French; as of 2017, she has taught at the Dominiques de Juneda College for a decade, and before that she was a secondary school teacher at the Maristes Montserrat de Lleida School for eleven years. She is a member of the Federation of Education Workers of the General Union of Workers (FETE-UGT).

In 1981, she joined the Democratic Convergence of Catalonia (CDC). She was elected to the City Council of Arbeca in 1998 and served as the city's mayor from 2005 to 2007. She was also a member of the Comarcal Council of Garrigues between 2003 and 2011 and was the CDC's Regional President for Garrigues from 2003 to 2012, after which she joined the party's National Executive Committee. In 2010, she was elected to the Catalan Parliament as a Deputy and continues to serve as of 2017; for the 2015 elections and subsequently, she has been a member of the Together for Yes (Junts pel Sí) alliance consisting of the CDC, the Republican Left of Catalonia (ERC), Democrats of Catalonia (DC) and the Left Movement (MES). She was appointed the Fourth Secretary on the Parliament's Board in 2015 and also remains in that role as of 2017.

== Catalan independence crisis ==
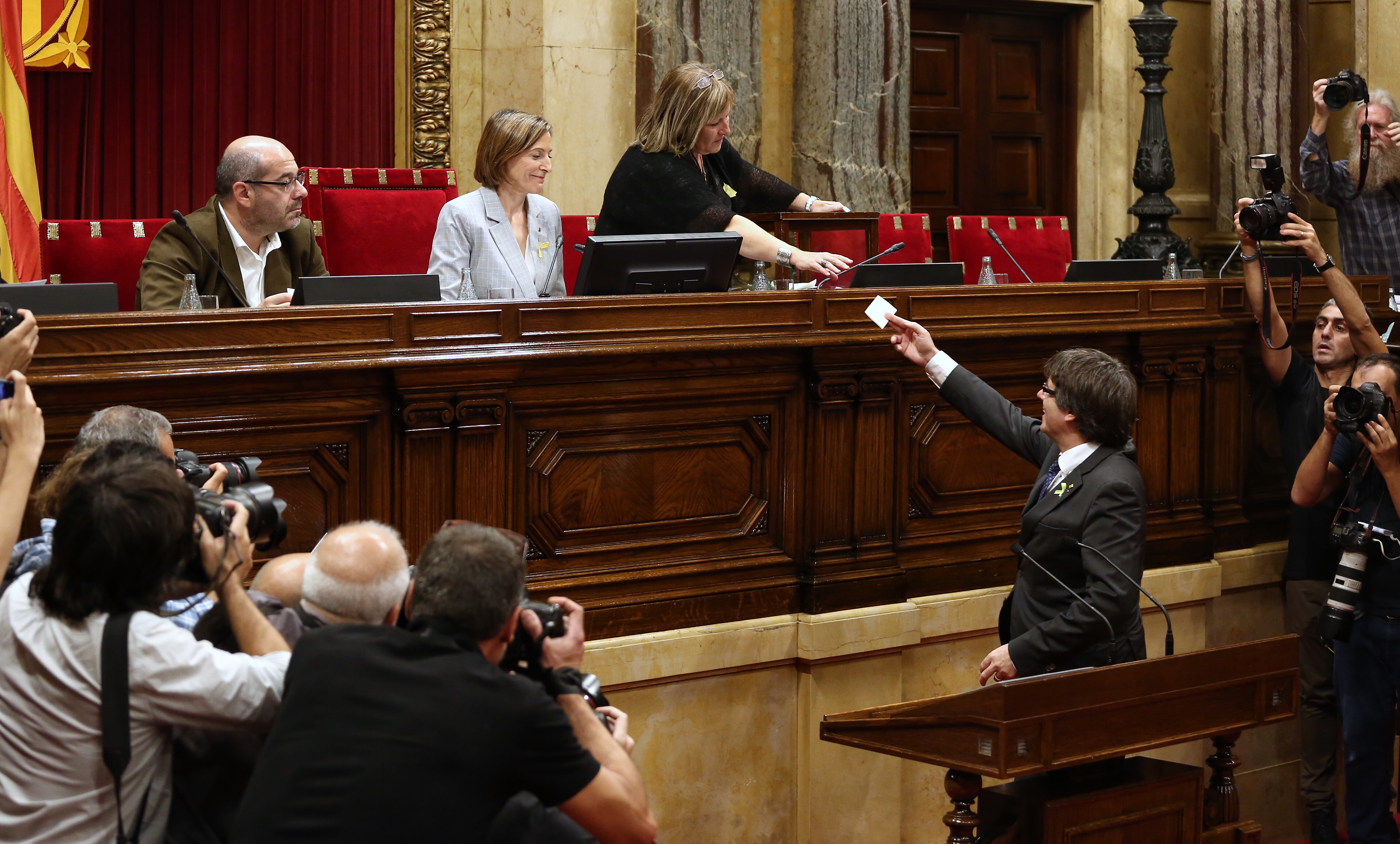
Barrufet receiving the vote of Puigdemont for Declaration of Independence on 27 October 2017

In June 2017 President of Catalonia Carles Puigdemont announced that a referendum on Catalan independence would be held on 1 October 2017. The Catalan Parliament passed legislation on 6 September 2017 authorising the referendum which would be binding and based on a simple majority without a minimum threshold. The following day Constitutional Court of Spain suspended the legislation, blocking the referendum. The Spanish government put into effect Operation Anubis in order to disrupt the organisation of the referendum and arrested Catalan government officials. Despite this the referendum went ahead though it was boycotted by unionists and turnout was only 43%. 92% of those who voted supported independence. Around 900 people were injured as the Spanish police used violence to try to prevent voting in the referendum.

On 27 October 2017 the Catalan Parliament declared independence in a vote boycotted by opposition MPs. Almost immediately the Senate of Spain invoked article 155 of the constitution, dismissing Puigdemont and the Catalan government and imposing direct rule on Catalonia. The following day Spanish Prime Minister Mariano Rajoy dissolved the Catalan Parliament and called for fresh regional elections on 21 December 2017.

On 30 October 2017 Spanish Attorney General José Manuel Maza laid charges of rebellion, sedition and misuse of public funds at the Supreme Court against Corominas and five other members of the Board of the Parliament of Catalonia (Ramona Barrufet, Carme Forcadell, Lluís Guinó, Joan Josep Nuet and Anna Simó). Corominas was charged despite not being a member of the board at the time of the declaration of independence. The charges carried maximum sentences of 30, 15 and 6 years in prison respectively.

Corominas and the other members of the board appeared before Supreme Court judge Pablo Llarena on 9 November 2017. Nuet was released without any precautionary measures but the other five had to pay bail (€100,000 for Forcadell, €25,000 each for Barrufet, Corominas, Guinó and Simó), surrender their passport and present themselves at a court weekly. The bail bonds were paid by the Catalan National Assembly.

After a four-month judicial investigation into the referendum and declaration of independence Supreme Court judge Pablo Llarena issued a 70-page ruling on 23 March 2018 in which he ordered that 25 of the 28 Catalan politicians and activists under investigation be tried for rebellion, embezzlement or disobedience. Corominas was charged with disobeying an order of the Constitutional Court (article 410 of the criminal code).

A pre-trial hearing commenced on 18 December 2018 at the Supreme Court at which defence lawyers argued that the court was not competent to hear charges of rebellion or disobedience and that it should be heard at the High Court of Justice of Catalonia. On 27 December 2018 the Supreme Court ruled that, although they were competent to hear all the charges, the six defendants charged only with disobedience (Barrufet, Mireia Boya, Corominas, Guinó, Nuet and Simó) would be tried at the High Court of Justice of Catalonia.
