= Núria de Gispert =

Spanish politician and lawyer (born 1949)

The Right Honourable Núria de Gispert CdSJ
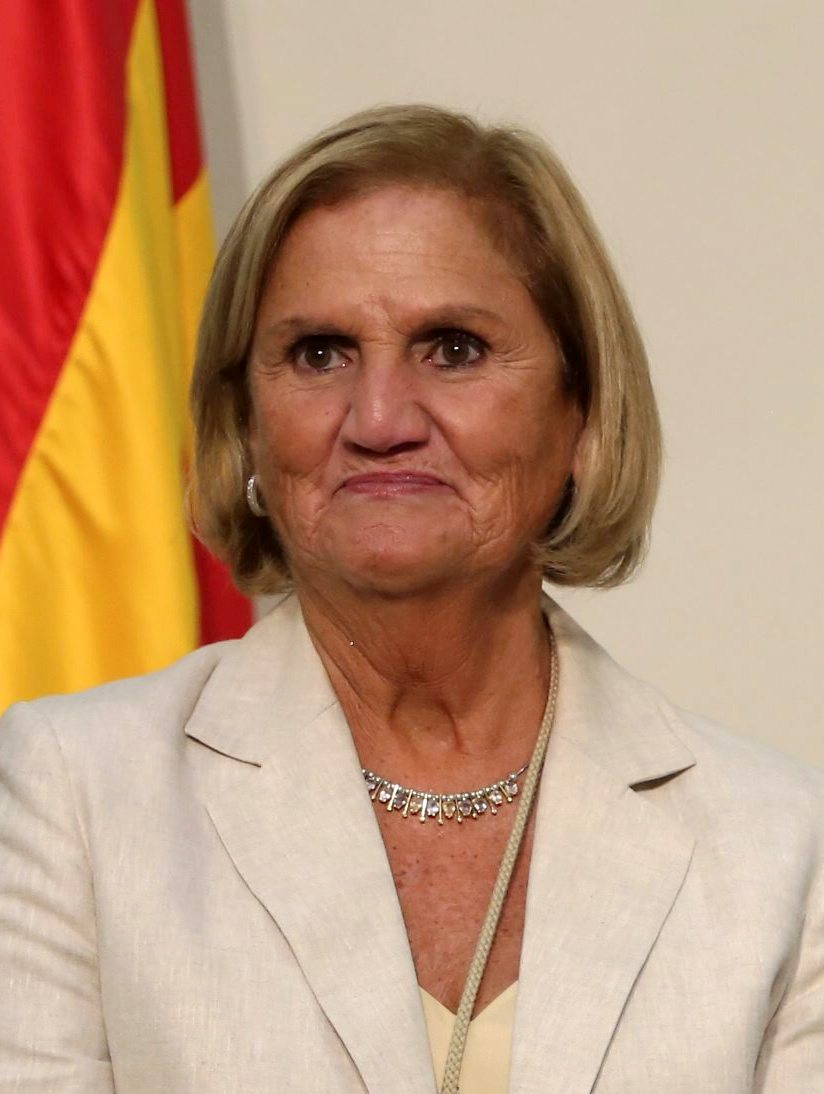

13th President of the Parliament of Catalonia
- In office 16 December 2010 – 26 October 2015
- President: Artur Mas
- Preceded by: Ernest Benach
- Succeeded by: Carme Forcadell

Minister of Justice of Catalonia
- In office 1 February 1995 – 5 February 2001
- President: Jordi Pujol
- Preceded by: Antoni Isac i Aguilar
- Succeeded by: Josep Delfí Guàrdia i Canela

Minister of Governance and Public Administration of Catalonia
- In office 5 February 2001 – 4 November 2002
- President: Jordi Pujol
- Preceded by: Josep Antoni Duran i Lleida
- Succeeded by: Josep Maria Pelegrí

Minister of Justice and Interior of Catalonia
- In office 4 November 2002 – 17 December 2003
- President: Jordi Pujol
- Preceded by: Josep Delfí Guàrdia i Canela (Justice); Xavier Pomés (Interior)
- Succeeded by: Josep Maria Vallès (Justice); Montserrat Tura (Interior)

Member of the Parliament of Catalonia
- In office 16 December 2003 – 26 October 2015
- Constituency: Barcelona

Personal details
- Born: Núria de Gispert i Català; 6 April 1949 (age 77) Barcelona, Catalonia, Spain
- Party: Demòcrates de Catalunya (2015–present)
- Other political affiliations: UDC (1986–2015)
- Education: University of Barcelona
- Occupation: Politician
- Profession: Lawyer
- Website: nuriadegispert.wordpress.com

Núria de Gispert i Català (Catalan pronunciation: [ˈnuɾiə ðə ʒisˈpɛɾt]; born 6 April 1949) is a Spanish politician and lawyer. Between 2010 and 2015 she served as speaker of Parliament of Catalonia.

== Biography ==
Núria de Gispert is married and has four children. She is also the daughter of politician and lawyer Ignasi de Gispert i Jordà, and great-granddaughter of Dorotea de Chopitea, protector and benefactor of several Catholic orders. De Gispert graduated in law at the University of Barcelona and she has also the title of legal translator from Ministry of Foreign Affairs and Cooperation of Spain. She worked as lawyer from 1971 to 1973. She started to work as civil servant at the Diputació de Barcelona in 1974; later, in 1980, she was moved to the Generalitat.

In recognition of her task as lawyer, he was awarded the Cross of St. Raymond of Peñafort (1998), the Cross of Merit to the Service of the Spanish Advocacy (2002) and the Medal of the Bar Association of Barcelona (2004). She is also a member of the Academy of Jurisprudence and Legislation of Catalonia since 2006.

== Speaker of the Parliament ==
On 16 December 2010, she was elected President of the Parliament of Catalonia in the constitutive session of the Parliament for the ninth legislature, being the first woman to hold this position in Catalonia. At the beginning of the 10th legislature, on 17 December 2012, she was re-elected for this position. Since she didn't run on the 2015 Catalan parliamentary election, she couldn't be re-elected. At the beginning of the 11th legislature, in October 2015, Carme Forcadell, part of the Junts pel Sí coalition, was elected new President of the Parliament of Catalonia.
