= Concepció Ferrer =

Spanish philologist, teacher and politician

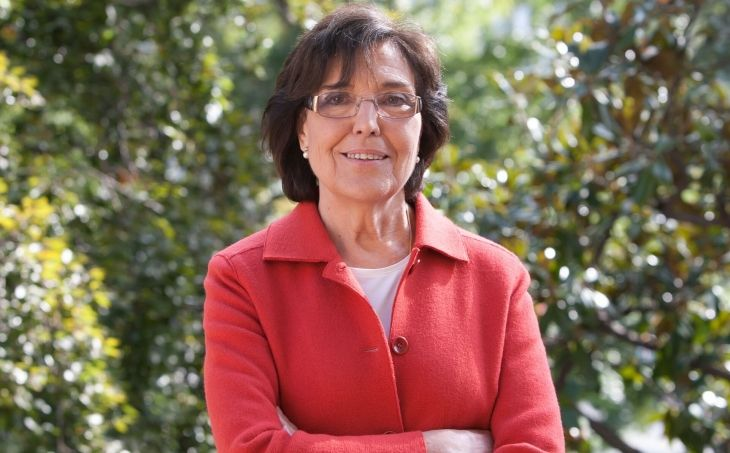

Second Deputy Defender of the People of Spain
- In office 2012

Member of the European Parliament for Spain
- In office 1986–2004

Deputy of the Parliament of Catalonia
- In office 1980–1987
- Constituency: Girona

Second Vice-President of the Parliament of Catalonia
- In office 1980

First Vice-President of the Parliament of Catalonia
- In office 1980–1984
- Succeeded by: Arcadi Calzada i Salavedra

Councilor of Figueres
- In office 1979

Personal details
- Born: Concepció Ferrer Casals; 27 January 1938 (age 88) Ripoll, Spain
- Party: Democratic Union of Catalonia; European People's Party
- Education: University of Barcelona
- Occupation: Academic, politician
- Awards: Creu de Sant Jordi (2011)

Concepció Ferrer Casals (born 27 January 1938) is a Spanish philologist, teacher and politician, the Second Deputy Defender of the People of Spain since 2012.

== Biography ==
With a licentiate in Romance Philology from the University of Barcelona, since the 1970s Concepció Ferrer has lived in Figueres, where she has been a professor of contemporary literature. In 1977 she joined the Democratic Union of Catalonia (UDC). In the municipal elections of 1979, she was elected councilor of the municipality of Figueres. Later, she obtained the Catalonian Parliament seat for the constituency of Girona when the first elections were held after the approval of the Statute of Catalan Autonomy, renewing her mandate in 1984, both times within the candidacy of Convergence and Union (CiU). From 1980 to 1984 she served as First Vice-President of the Catalan Parliament.

In the European elections of 1987 she was elected deputy of the European Parliament, a seat that she renewed in the successive electoral calls until 2004. At the European level, she was vice-president of the European People's Party and president of the Unión Femenina Democristiana Europea. She has been a member of the Academic and Social Council of the International University of Catalonia, and in 2012 she was elected Second Deputy of the Defender of the People, a responsibility she currently holds. In 2011, she was awarded the Creu de Sant Jordi.

== Works ==
- El Parlament Europeu, motor de la construcció europea
- Nacionalisme i europeisme (1990)
- Reflexions europees (1994)
- La Utopia d'Europa (1994), ISBN 9788488591357
- Petita Història d'Europa (1998), ISBN 9788483340141
- Una veu a Europa (1999), ISBN 9788483341056
- Torn de paraula (2004), ISBN 9788483345672
- Petita Història dels Drets Humans (2010), ISBN 9788483345641
