= Carme Valls =

Spanish endocrinologist and politician (born 1945)

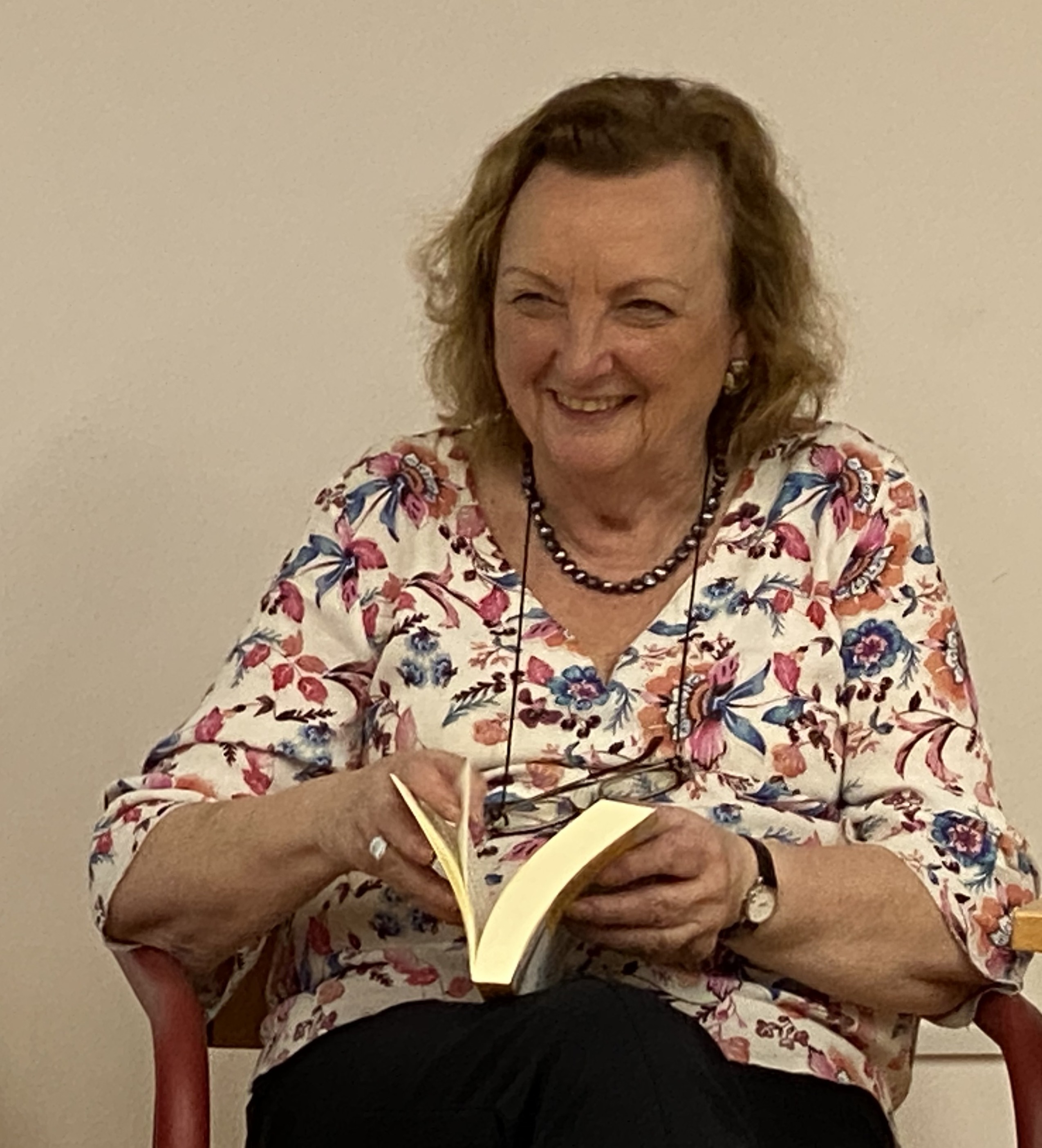
Valls in 2019

Carme Valls i Llobet (born 1945) is a Spanish endocrinologist and politician. She is President of CAPS, Centro de Análisis y Programas Sanitarios.

She was a deputy in the 6th and 7th assemblies of the Parliament of Catalonia, from 1999 to 2006, representing Barcelona for the Socialists' Party of Catalonia.

She was born in Barcelona on 21 May 1945.

In 2020 she was awarded the Creu de Sant Jordi.

== Selected publications ==
- Mujeres invisibles para la Medicina: Desvelando nuestra salud (2021, ISBN 978-8412064469)
- Medio ambiente y salud: Mujeres y hombres en un mundo de nuevos riesgos (2018, ISBN 978-8437637938)
- Mujeres, salud y poder (2009, ISBN 978-8437626161)
