= Joan Rigol =

Spanish politician (1943–2024)

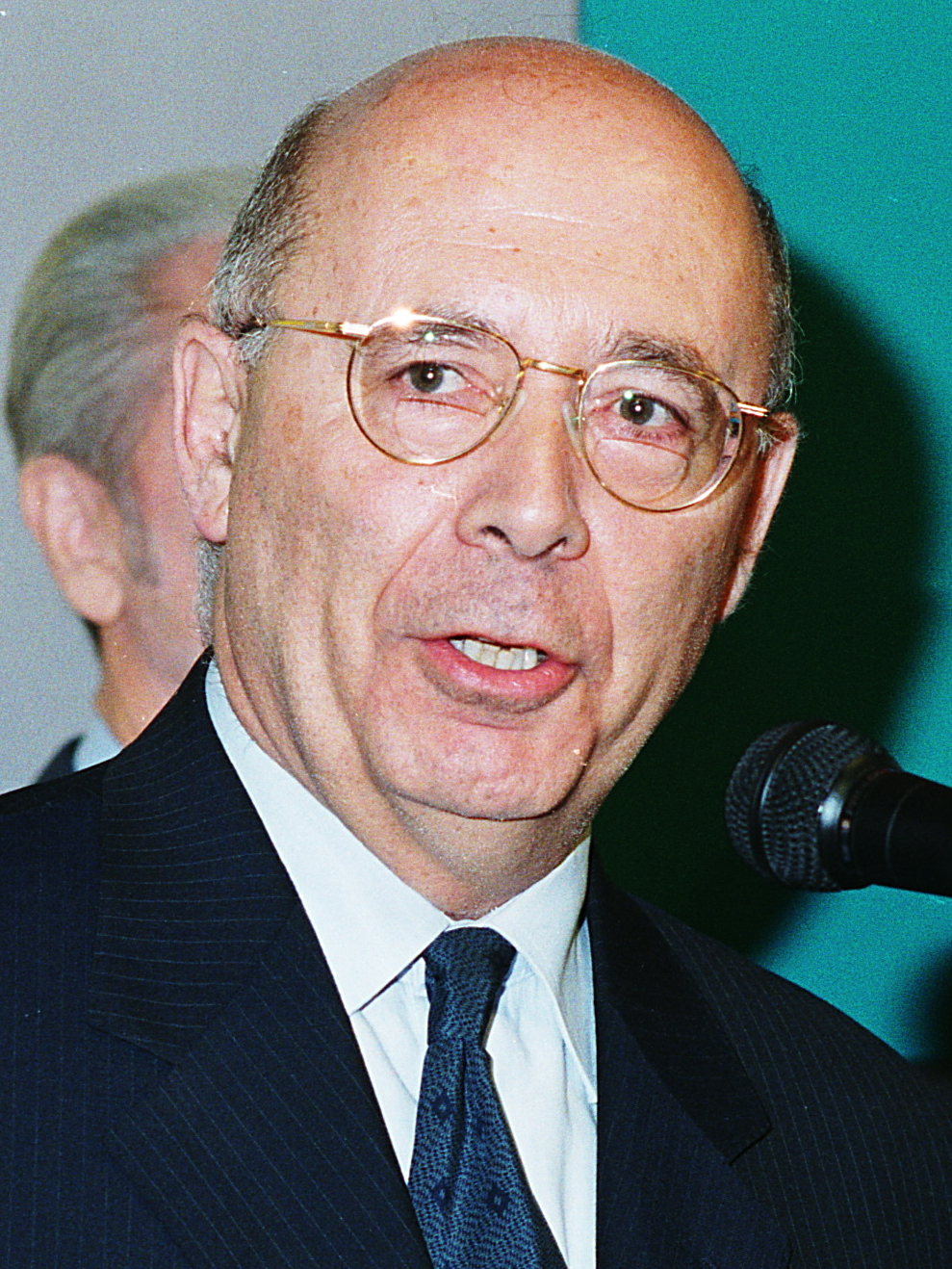
- Rigol in 2001

11th President of Catalan Parliament
- In office 29 November 1999 – 17 December 2003
- Preceded by: Joan Reventós
- Succeeded by: Ernest Benach

Minister of Employment of the Generalitat de Catalunya
- In office 8 May 1980 – 18 June 1984
- President: Jordi Pujol
- Preceded by: Joan Codina i Torres
- Succeeded by: Oriol Badia i Tobella

Minister of Culture of the Generalitat de Catalunya
- In office 18 June 1984 – 19 December 1985
- President: Jordi Pujol
- Preceded by: Max Canher i Garcia
- Succeeded by: Joaquim Ferrer Roca

Personal details
- Born: 4 April 1943 Torrelles de Llobregat, Spain
- Died: 7 May 2024 (aged 81)
- Party: UDC

Joan Rigol i Roig (Catalan pronunciation: [ʒuˈan riˈɣɔl]; 4 April 1943 – 7 May 2024) was a Spanish politician. He was a president of the Parliament of Catalonia. Rigol also sat in the Spanish Congress from 1979 to 1980, representing Barcelona Province.

Rigol studied philosophy and held a Master's degree in Business Administration from ESADE. In 1976 he joined the Democratic Union of Catalonia (UDC), the political party which he presided from 1987 to 2000.

Rigol died on 7 May 2024, aged 81.

Preceded by Joan Codina i Torres	Minister of Employment of the Generalitat de Catalunya; 1980–1984	Succeeded by Oriol Badia i Tobella
Preceded by Max Cahner i Garcia	Minister of Culture of the Generalitat de Catalunya; 1984–1985	Succeeded by Joaquim Ferrer i Roca
Preceded by Joan Reventós	President of Catalan Parliament; 1999–2003	Succeeded by Ernest Benach
