= List of presidents of the Parliament of Catalonia =

President of Parliament of Catalonia
- President del Parlament de Catalunya
- Seal of the Generalitat of Catalonia

- Flag of Catalonia

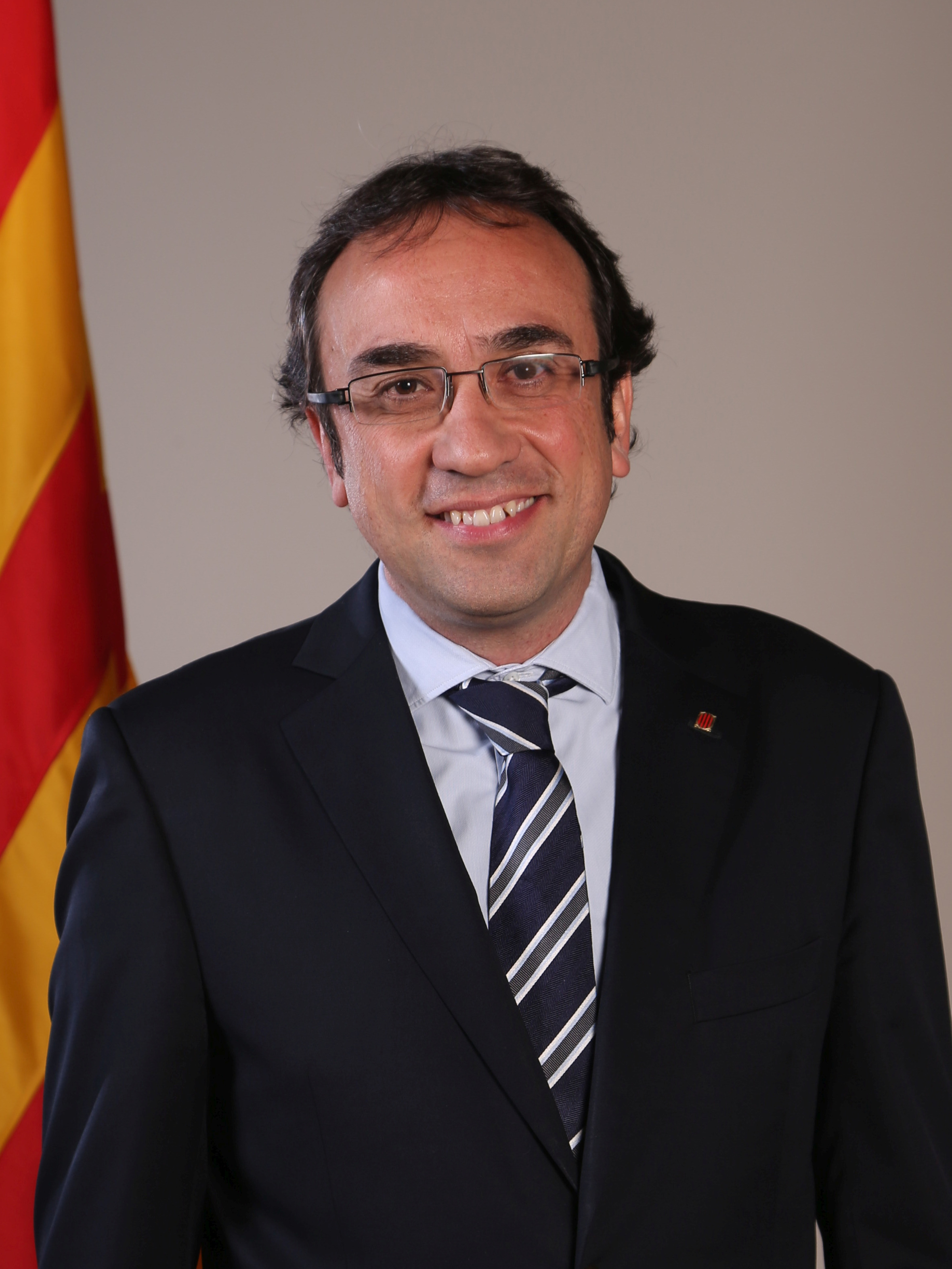
- Incumbent; Josep Rull since 10 June 2024
- Style: El Molt Honorable Senyor (The Right Honourable)
- Member of: Parliament of Catalonia
- Seat: Barcelona
- Nominator: Parliament of Catalonia
- Term length: Elected by Parliament at the start of each legislative term, and upon a vacancy; renewable
- Inaugural holder: Lluís Companys
- Formation: 14 December 1932
- Salary: €143,771.40 per year (Note: €114,285.12 for the office of President and €22,679.16–31,923.60 as compensation for travel expenses as MP (depending on municipality of residence).)
- Website: www.parlament.cat/presidencia/

This article lists the presidents of the Parliament of Catalonia, the presiding officers of the regional legislature of Catalonia. It also leads the Board of the Parliament of Catalonia.

== List ==
No.	Name	Portrait	Party	Took office	Left office	Refs
1	Lluís Companys		ERC	14 December 1932	20 June 1933	
2	Joan Casanovas i Maristany		ERC	20 June 1933	18 August 1938	
3	Josep Irla		ERC	18 August 1938	15 October 1940	
4	Antoni Rovira i Virgili		ERC	15 October 1940	5 December 1949	
5	Manuel Serra i Moret		Independent	5 December 1949	7 August 1954	
6	Francesc Farreres i Duran		ERC	7 August 1954	24 April 1980	
7	Heribert Barrera		ERC	24 April 1980	18 June 1984	
8	Miquel Coll i Alentorn		UDC	18 June 1984	4 July 1988	
9	Joaquim Xicoy i Bassegoda		UDC	4 July 1988	30 November 1995	
10	Joan Reventós		PSC	30 November 1995	29 November 1999	
11	Joan Rigol		UDC	29 November 1999	17 December 2003	
12	Ernest Benach		ERC	17 December 2003	16 December 2010	
13	Núria de Gispert		UDC	16 December 2010	26 December 2015	
14	Carme Forcadell		ERC	26 December 2015	17 January 2018	
15	Roger Torrent		ERC	17 January 2018	12 March 2021	
16	Laura Borràs		Junts	12 March 2021	1 June 2023 (Note: Suspended since 28 July 2022.)	
17	Anna Erra		Junts	9 June 2023	10 June 2024	
18	Josep Rull		Junts	10 June 2024	Incumbent	
