= Department of Justice of the Government of Catalonia =

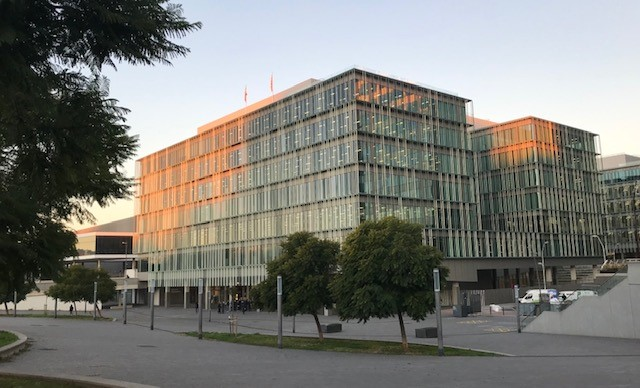
Administrative district

The Department of Justice of the Government of Catalonia (Catalan: Departament de Justícia de la Generalitat de Catalunya; Spanish: Departamento de Justicia de la Generalidad de Cataluña) is the Ministry of Justice part of the Executive Council of Catalonia, administering the justice system of the Catalonian self-government, the Generalitat de Catalunya.

== Leadership ==
Established in 1931, the Minister of Justice is the highest representative. The current minister is Lourdes Ciuró.

== Functions ==
The functions of the Department of Justice correspond to:

- The functions related to the Justice Administration in Catalonia and its modernization.
- Penitentiary services, rehabilitation and juvenile justice.
- The conservation, updating and development of civil law in Catalonia.
- Associations, foundations, professional colleges and academies.
- Notaries and registrars.
- The promotion and development of alternative means of conflict resolution.
- Religious affairs
- The democratic memory, the promotion of peace and political and civil human rights.
- The regulation and supervision of interest groups.
- Any other attributed to you by law and other provisions.

== Affiliated organisations ==
The Center for Legal Studies and Specialized Training and the Center for Contemporary History remain attached to the department.

== See also ==
- Justice ministry
- The Ministry of Justice of Spain
- Politics of Catalonia
- The Public Prosecutor of the Autonomous Communities of Spain
- Spanish Attorney General
