= Carmelita, Belize =

Carmelita
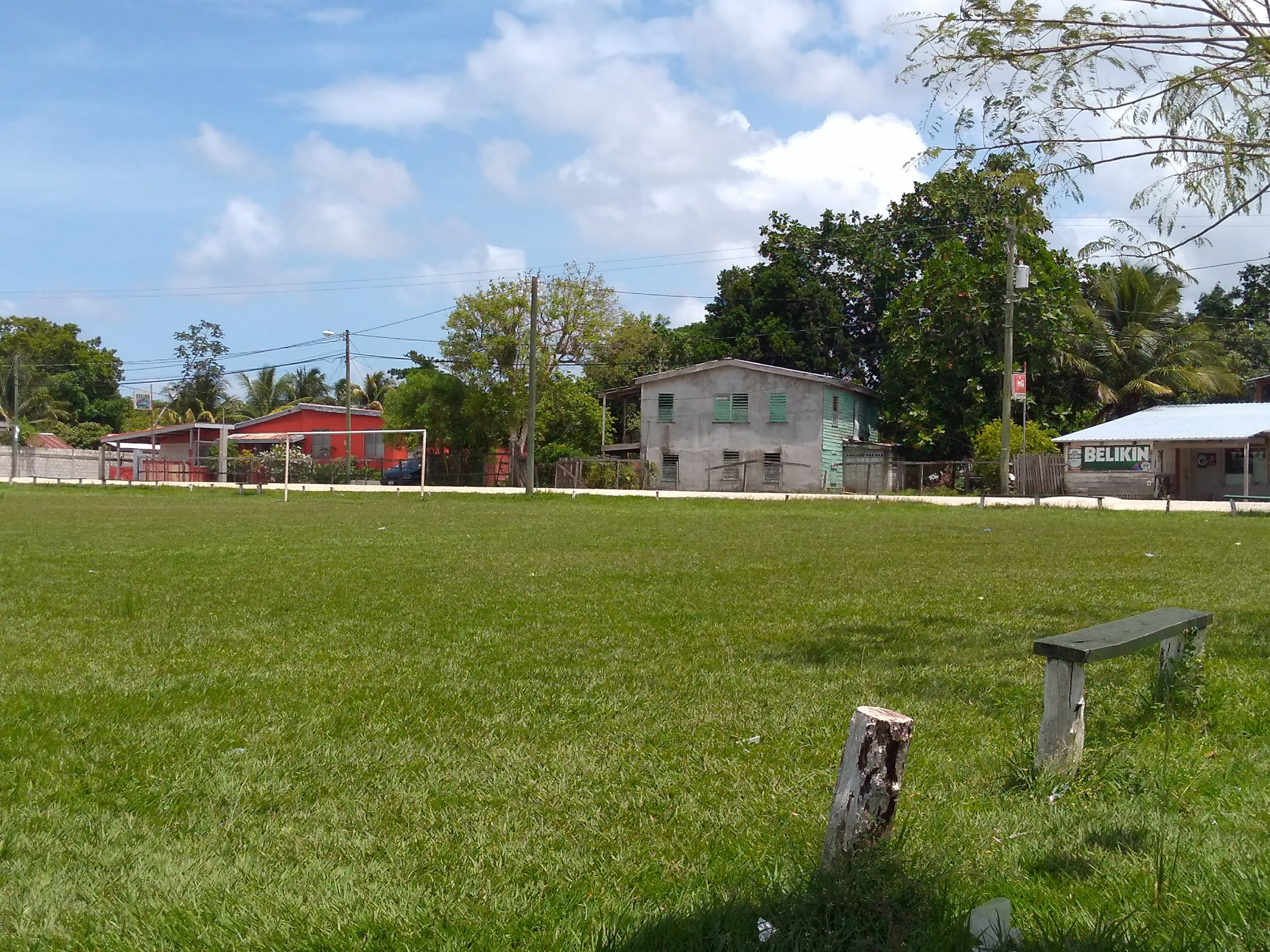
- The football field at the Carmelita sports center.

- Location within Belize
- Coordinates: 18°0′51″N 88°32′33″W
- Country: Belize
- District: Orange Walk District
- Constituency: Orange Walk East
- Time zone: UTC-6 (Central)
- Climate: Am

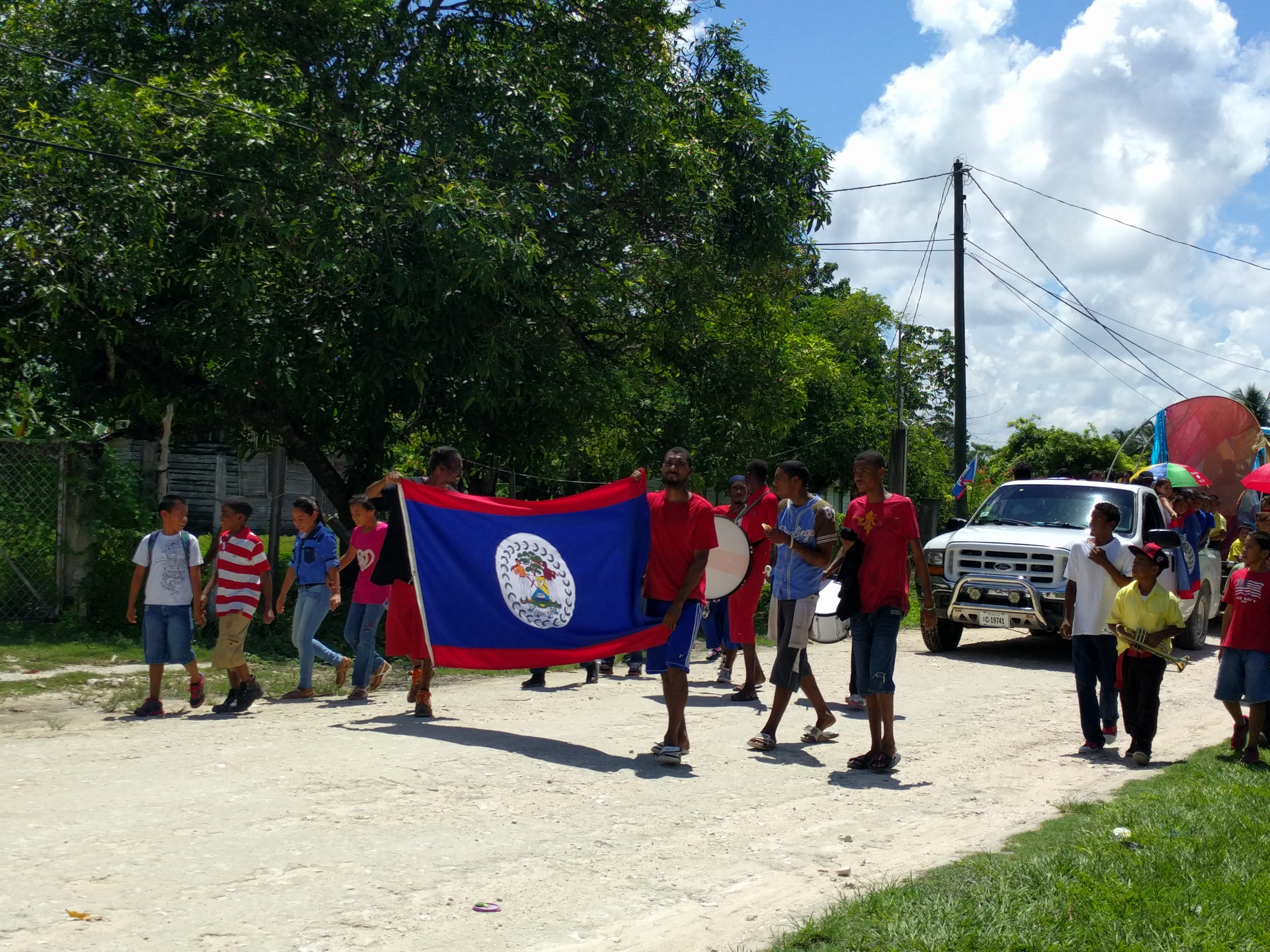
An Independence Day Parade along Church St. in Carmelita.

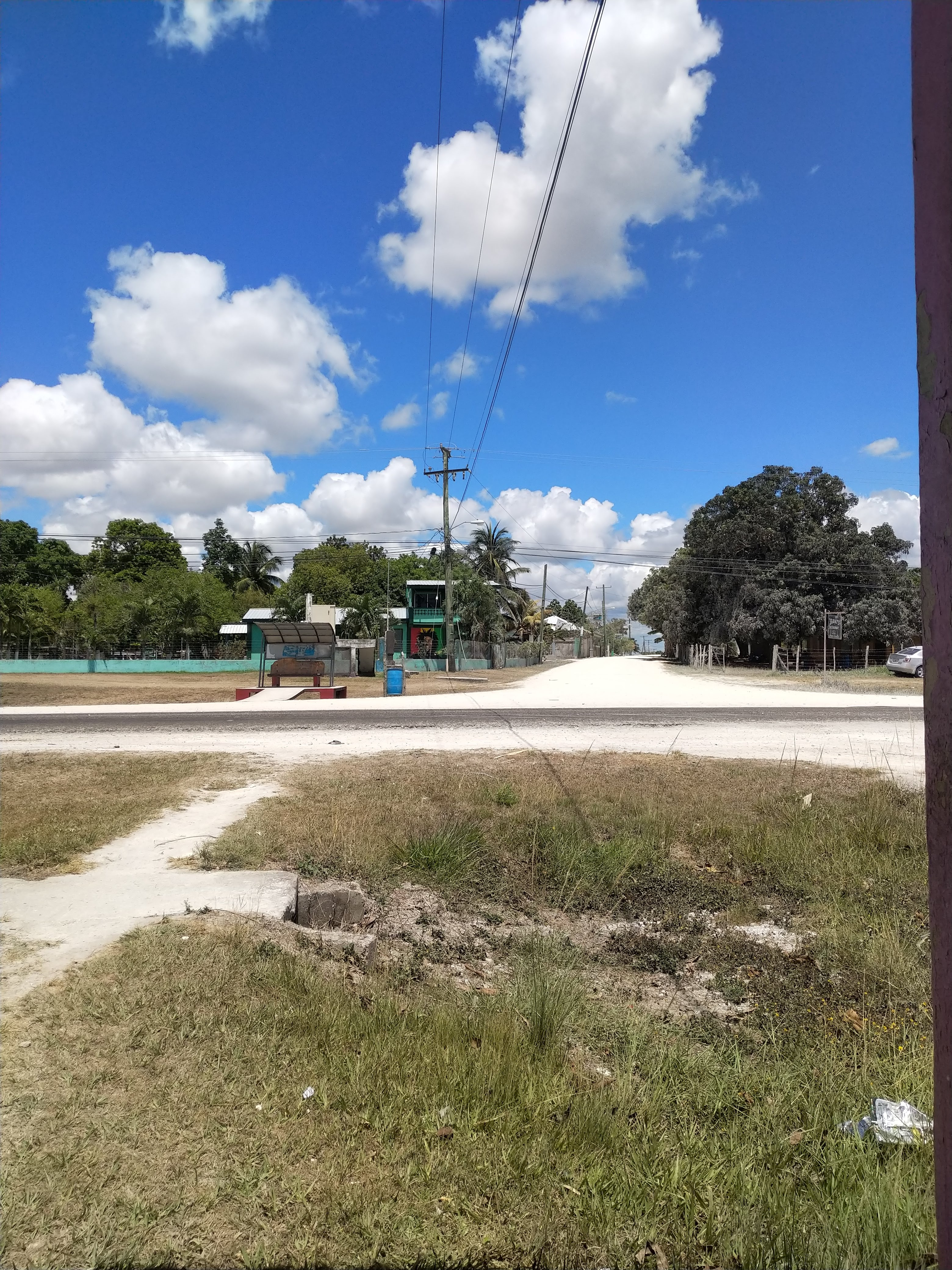
View of Carmelita and the Northern Highway.

Carmelita is a rapidly-expanding village in the Orange Walk District of the nation of Belize. According to the 2010 census, it had a population of 1,474 people. It lies along the New River. Carmelita has the country's only toll booth at the New River bridge on the Northern Highway where the village begins. Beside the bridge lies an access point for boat tours to the Maya historic site, Lamanai.

Carmelita was the inland village featured in the documentary Gringo: The Dangerous Life of John McAfee where John McAfee built multiple properties including a police station (which has since been converted into a house).
