= Juan Carlos Campo =

Spanish judge and politician

The Most Excellent Juan Carlos Campo First Notary of the Kingdom
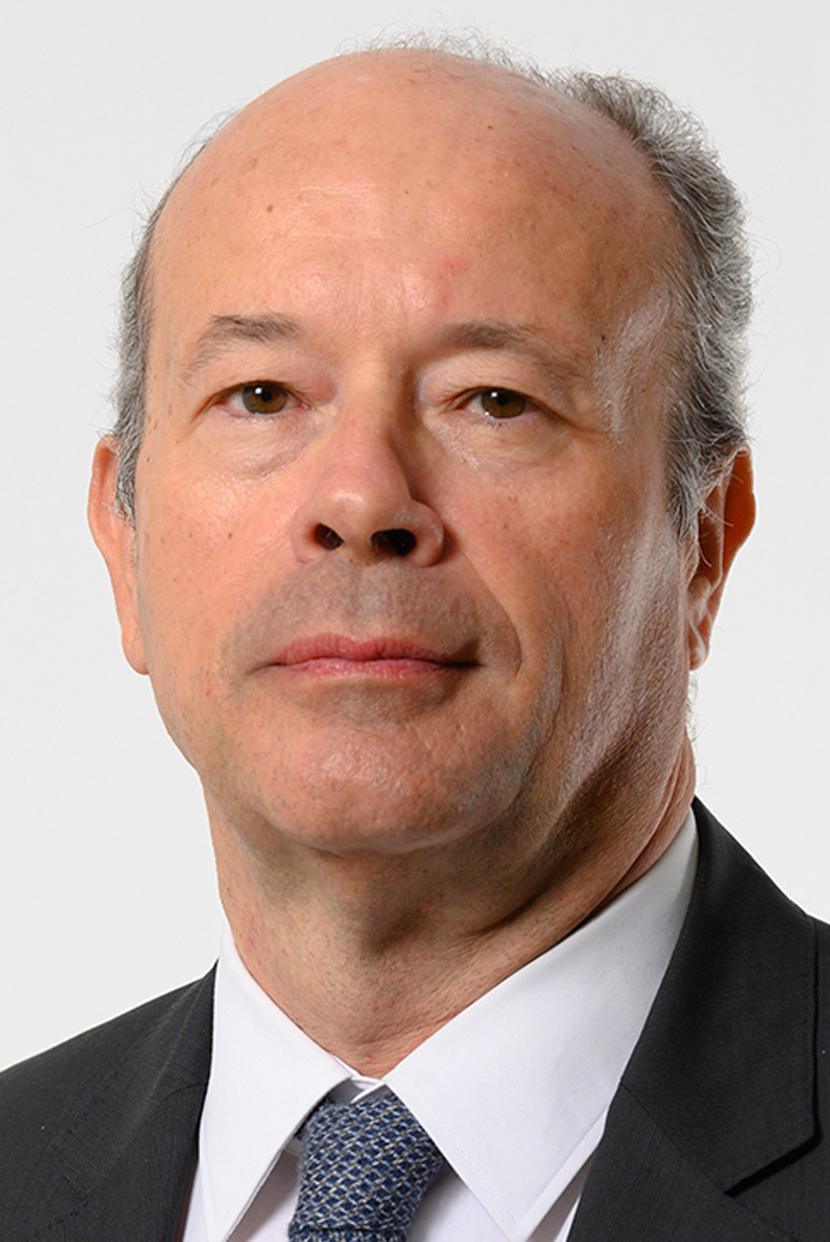

Minister of Justice First Notary of the Kingdom
- In office 13 January 2020 – 12 July 2021
- Prime Minister: Pedro Sánchez
- Preceded by: Dolores Delgado
- Succeeded by: Pilar Llop

Secretary of State for Justice
- In office 2 March 2009 – 31 December 2011
- Prime Minister: José Luis Rodríguez Zapatero
- Preceded by: Julio Pérez Hernández
- Succeeded by: Fernando Román García

Member of the Congress of Deputies
- In office 2 January 2016 – 21 February 2020
- Constituency: Cádiz

Member of the General Council of the Judiciary
- In office 4 December 2011 – 6 June 2008

Personal details
- Born: Juan Carlos Campo Moreno; 17 October 1961 (age 64) Osuna, Spain
- Party: Spanish Socialist Workers' Party
- Education: University of Cádiz

Juan Carlos Campo Moreno (born 17 October 1961) is a Spanish judge and politician who served as minister of Justice and ex officio First Notary of the Kingdom from 2020 to 2021 and as Member of the Congress of Deputies from 2016 to 2020 representing Cádiz. Previously, he served as the 7th Secretary of State for Justice from 2009 to 2011 and as member of the General Council of the Judiciary from 2001 to 2008.

== Biography ==
Juan Carlos Campo was born in Osuna, Spain, on October 17, 1961. He is graduated in law by the University of Cadiz. Campo joined the judiciary in 1987, being promoted to magistrate in 1989. Since 1997, he is Doctor of Laws by the Cadiz University and he was also law Lecturer in Andalusian Interuniversity Institute of Criminology. Since April 2019, he is also member of the Royal Academy of Jurisprudence and Legislation.

=== Judge ===
As a judge, Campo has been assigned to the courthouses of Sanlúcar de Barrameda and Cádiz. In 1991 he was promoted to the Second Chamber of the Provincial Court of Cádiz.

=== Political career ===
In 1997 he was appointed Director-General for Relations with the Administration of Justice of the Regional Government of Andalusia until 2001, when he joined the General Council of the Judiciary.

In February 2009, he was appointed as the 7th Secretary of State for Justice by Justice Minister Francisco Caamaño Domínguez. He left the office in December 2011, when his government lost the general election.

In November 2014, he was appointed Secretary-General for Relations with Parliament within the Andalusian Government.

He was one of the candidates proposed by the PSOE in the Senate to fill one of the vacancies of a magistrate in the renewal of the Constitutional Court, although his candidacy was rejected.

==== Member of Congress and Minister of Justice of Spain ====
In the 2015 general election, he was elected by the constituency of Cádiz and he was re-elected in the April and November 2019 general elections.

During his time as member of parliament, Campo has been a member of several congressional committees such as Home Affairs Committee, Justice Committee, Constitutional Committee, the Committee on Democratic Quality, Against Corruption and for Institutional and Legal Reforms, the Committee on Monitoring and Evaluation of the Agreements of the State Pact against Gender Violence, the committee on the Study of the Police Model of the 21st Century and the Sub-committee on the Study and Definition of the National Justice Strategy.

=== Minister of Justice ===
Because of his experience as Secretary of State for Justice, on January 11, 2020, the Office of the Prime Minister, Pedro Sánchez, announced that he would be appointed Minister of Justice in the Sánchez Second Cabinet succeeding Dolores Delgado. He took the office on 13 January 2020 before the King in Zarzuela Palace and as First Notary of the Kingdom, attested to the inauguration of the rest of the new government.

In February 2020 he resigned as MP to focus on government affairs and in July 2021 he was replaced by Pilar Llop as minister of Justice.

==== Member of the Constitutional Court ====
In November 2022, the Government proposed Campo as magistrate of the Constitutional Court. This proposal was criticized by Unidas Podemos, the other party that made up the coalition government, as well as by the opposition.

After receiving the approval of the Plenary of the Constitutional Court, he was sworn in by King Felipe VI on 31 December 2022.

== Bibliography ==
- Arrepentimiento postdelictual. Madrid, Editorial General del Derecho, 1995.`ISBN 978-84-89500-00-6.
- Represión penal del terrorismo. Una visión jurisprudencial. Madrid, Editorial General del Derecho, 1997. ISBN 978-84-89500-10-5.
- Los actos preparatorios punibles. Valencia, Tirant lo Blanch, 2000. ISBN 978-84-8442-085-9.
- El Estado autonómico, también en Justicia. Valencia, Tirant lo Blanch, 2005.
- Comentarios a la reforma del Código Penal en materia de terrorismo: La L.O.2/2015. Valencia, Tirant lo Blanch, 2015.
