= Running with the Devil (disambiguation) =

Running with the Devil is a 2019 film directed by Jason Cabell.

Running with the Devil may also refer to:

- Running with the Devil: The Wild World of John McAfee, a 2022 film directed by Charlie Russell
- "Running with The Devil", a 2020 song by Alexz Johnson
- Running With the Devil: Power, Gender, and Madness in Heavy Metal Music, 1993 book by Robert Walser (musicologist)

== See also ==
- Runnin' with the Devil, a 1978 song by Van Halen
