= John McAfee =

British and American programmer and businessman (1945–2021)

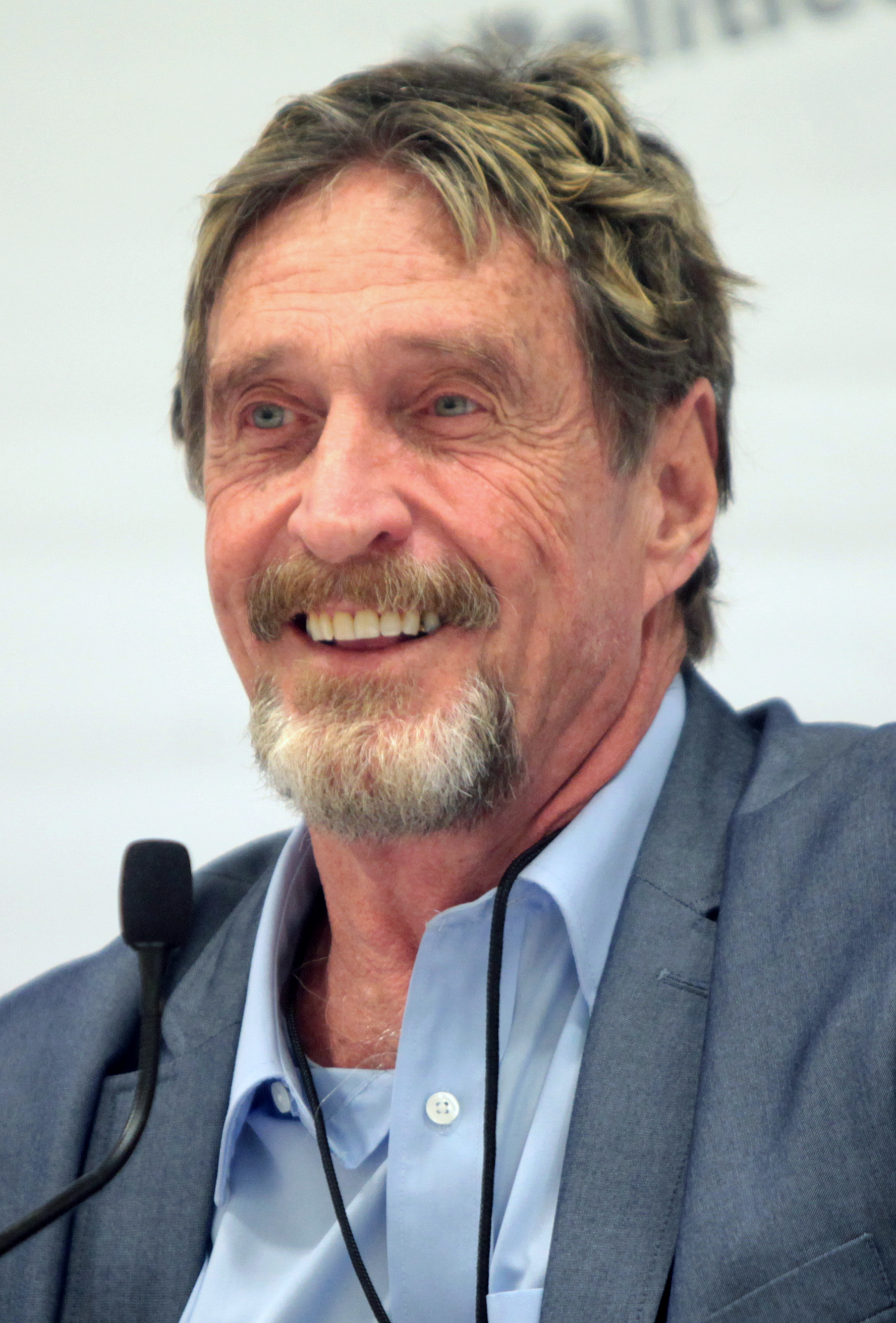
- McAfee at Politicon in 2016
- Born: John David McAfee; 18 September 1945; Cinderford, Gloucestershire, England
- Died: 23 June 2021 (aged 75); Sant Esteve Sesrovires, Catalonia, Spain
- Cause of death: Suicide by hanging
- Citizenship: United Kingdom; United States
- Education: Roanoke College (BA)
- Occupations: Businessman; computer programmer; perennial candidate
- Known for: Founder of McAfee Corp.
- Political party: Libertarian (before 2015, 2016–2021)
- Other political affiliations: Cyber (2015–2016)
- Criminal charges: Tax evasion
- Spouses: Fran (divorced) Judy Chambliss (div. 2002) Janice Dyson (m. 2013)
- Children: 1 (Note: McAfee frequently claimed to have up to 47 children.)

John David McAfee (/ˈmækəfiː/, MAK-ə-fee; 18 September 1945 – 23 June 2021) was a British and American computer programmer, businessman, and two-time U.S. presidential candidate who unsuccessfully sought the Libertarian Party nomination for president of the United States in 2016 and in 2020. In 1987, he wrote the first commercial anti-virus software, founding McAfee Associates to sell his creation. He resigned in 1994 and sold his remaining stake in the company. McAfee became the company's most vocal critic in later years, urging consumers to uninstall the company's anti-virus software, which he characterized as bloatware. He disavowed the company's continued use of his name in branding, a practice that has persisted in spite of a short-lived corporate rebrand attempt under Intel ownership.

McAfee's fortunes plummeted in the 2008 financial crisis. After leaving McAfee Associates, he founded the companies Tribal Voice (makers of the PowWow chat program), QuorumEx, and Future Tense Central, among others, and was involved in leadership positions in the companies Everykey, MGT Capital Investments, and Luxcore, among others. His personal and business interests included smartphone apps, cryptocurrency, yoga, light-sport aircraft and recreational drug use. He resided for multiple years in Belize but returned to the United States in 2013 while wanted in Belize for questioning on suspicion of murder.

McAfee was a vocal advocate for privacy and personal freedom, central to his libertarian campaigns in 2016 and 2020. He opposed government surveillance and supported cryptocurrency as a way to reduce state control over financial systems. He framed his legal issues, including tax evasion charges, as resistance to unjust government overreach.

In October 2020, McAfee was arrested in Spain over U.S. tax evasion charges. U.S. federal prosecutors brought criminal and civil charges alleging that McAfee had failed to file income taxes over a four-year period. On 23 June 2021, he was found dead due to an apparent suicide by hanging in his prison cell near Barcelona shortly after the Spanish National Court authorized his extradition to the U.S. His death generated speculation and theories about the possibility that he was murdered. McAfee's wife, Janice McAfee, said she did not believe McAfee died by suicide.

== Early life ==
McAfee was born in Cinderford, in the Forest of Dean, Gloucestershire, England, on 18 September 1945, on a U.S. Army base (of the 596th Ordnance Ammunition Company), to an American father, Don McAfee, who was stationed there, and a British mother, Joan Williams. His father was from Roanoke, Virginia. McAfee was primarily raised in Salem, Virginia, and said he felt as much British as American. When he was 15, his father, whom a BBC columnist described as "an abusive alcoholic", killed himself with a gun. He had spent his childhood living in fear that a beating from his father could happen at any time and struggled to make sense of why this was happening to him. In Running With the Devil: The Wild World of John McAfee, it is alleged that McAfee may have shot and killed his father, staging the scene to look like a suicide.

McAfee received a bachelor's degree in mathematics in 1967 from Roanoke College in Virginia, which later awarded him an honorary Doctor of Science degree in 2008. After receiving his bachelor's degree, McAfee began working towards a doctorate in mathematics at Northeast Louisiana State College, but was expelled in about 1968 because of a relationship with an undergraduate student, who became his first wife.

== Ventures ==
=== NASA, Univac, Xerox, CSC, Booz Allen and Lockheed ===
McAfee was employed as a programmer by NASA from 1968 to 1970. From there, he went to Univac as a software designer, and later to Xerox as an operating system architect. In 1978, he joined Computer Sciences Corporation as a software consultant. He worked for consulting firm Booz Allen Hamilton from 1980 to 1982. In 1986, while employed by Lockheed, he read about the Brain computer virus made for the PC, and he found it terrifying. Sensing a business opportunity, he went about creating an antivirus software that could detect the computer virus and remove it automatically. In 1987, McAfee created McAfee Associates Inc. to sell this software, which he named VirusScan. This was the first anti-virus software brought to market, and one of the first software products to be distributed over the Internet.

=== McAfee Associates ===
Initially McAfee did not seek a large userbase of paying users, but rather wanted to raise awareness of the need to be protected from computer viruses. However, by making people fear such malware, he managed to generate millions of sales, and by 1990 he was making $5 million a year. The company was incorporated in Delaware in 1992, and had its initial public offering the same year. In August 1993, McAfee stepped down as chief executive and remained with the company as the chief technical officer. He was succeeded by Bill Larson. In 1994 he sold his remaining stake in the company. He had no further involvement in its operations.

After various mergers and ownership changes, Intel acquired McAfee in August 2010. In January 2014, Intel announced that McAfee-related products would be marketed as Intel Security. McAfee expressed his pleasure at the name change, saying, "I am now everlastingly grateful to Intel for freeing me from this terrible association with the worst software on the planet." The business was soon de-merged from Intel, once more under the McAfee name.

=== PowWow, QuoromEx, MGT and more ===
McAfee founded the company Tribal Voice in 1994, which developed one of the first instant messaging programs, PowWow.

In 2000, he invested in and joined the board of directors of Zone Labs, makers of firewall software, prior to its acquisition by Check Point Software in 2003. In the 2000s McAfee invested in and advertised ultra-light flights, which he marketed as aerotrekking.

In 2000 he bought a large property in Colorado and opened a yoga and meditation retreat there. In the following year he authored four books on yoga and meditation.

In August 2009 The New York Times reported that McAfee's personal fortune had declined to $4 million from a peak of $100 million due to the effect of the 2008 financial crisis on his investments.

McAfee relocated to Belize in 2009, buying a beachfront property on the island of Ambergris Caye and later also some property near the mainland village of Carmelita, where he surrounded himself with a large group of armed security guards.

In 2009, McAfee was interviewed in Belize for the CNBC special The Bubble Decade, in which it was reported that he had invested in and/or built many mansions in the USA that went unsold when the 2007 global recession hit. The report also discussed his quest to raise plants for possible medicinal uses on his land in Belize.

In February 2010, McAfee and biologist Allison Adonizio started the company QuorumEx, headquartered in Belize, which aimed to produce herbal antibiotics that disrupt quorum sensing in bacteria.

In June 2013, McAfee uploaded a parody video titled How to Uninstall McAfee Antivirus onto his YouTube channel. In it, he critiques the antivirus software while snorting white powder and being stripped by scantily clad women. It received ten million views. He told Reuters the video was meant to ridicule the media's negative coverage of him. A spokesman for McAfee Inc. called the video's statements "ludicrous".

Also in 2013, McAfee founded Future Tense Central, which aimed to produce a secure computer network device called the D-Central. By 2016, it was also an incubator.

In February 2014, McAfee announced Cognizant, an application for smartphones which displays information about the permissions of other installed applications. In April 2014, it was renamed DCentral 1, and an Android version was released for free on Google Play.

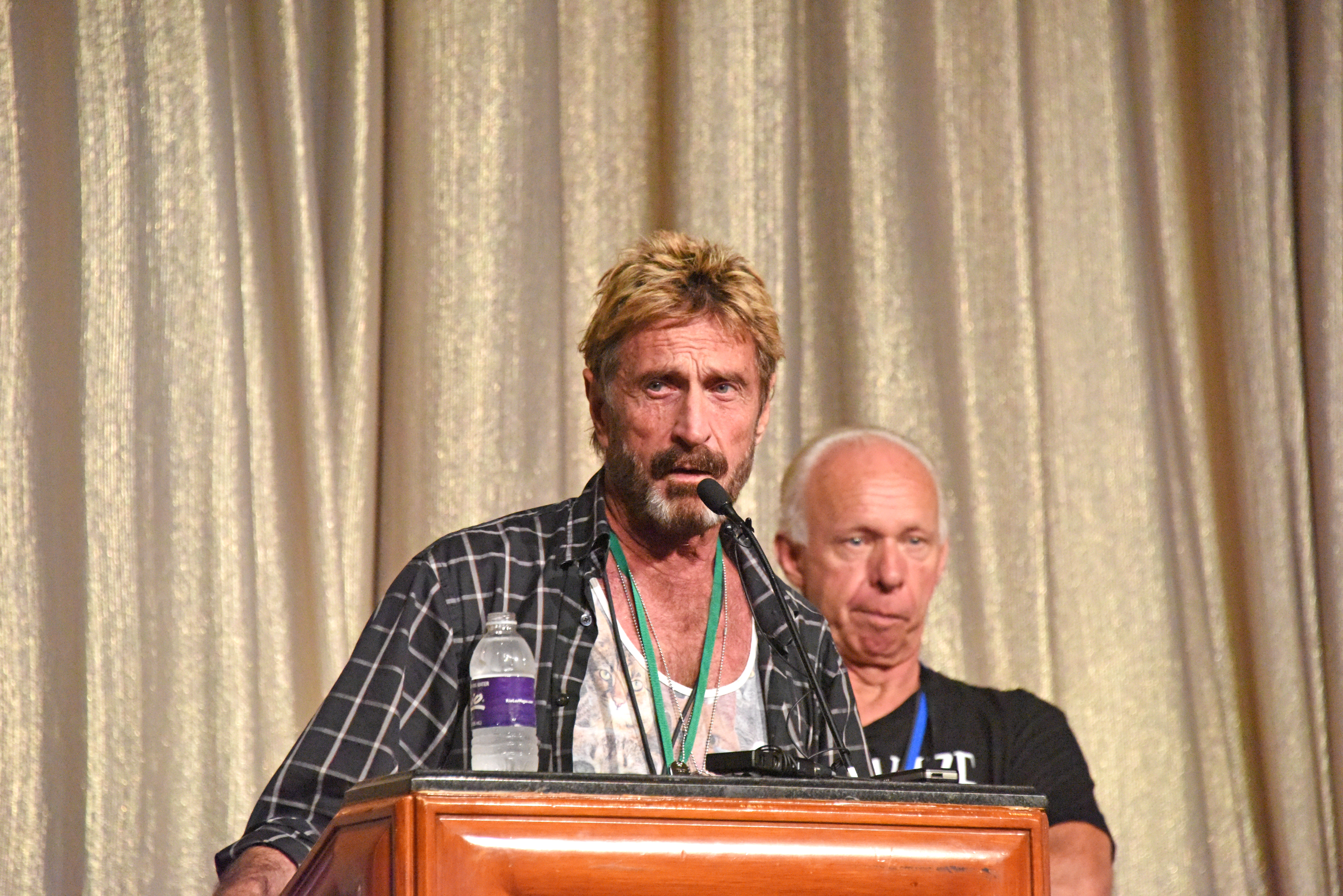
McAfee at DEF CON 2014

At the DEF CON conference in Las Vegas in August 2014, McAfee warned people not to use smartphones, suggesting apps are used to spy on clueless consumers who do not read privacy user agreements. In January 2016, he became the chief evangelist for security startup Everykey.

In February 2016, McAfee publicly volunteered to decrypt the iPhone used by Rizwan Farook and Tashfeen Malik in San Bernardino, avoiding the need for Apple to build a backdoor. He later admitted that his claims regarding the ease of cracking the phone were a publicity stunt, while still asserting its possibility.

=== MGT Capital Investments (2016–2018) ===
In May 2016, McAfee was appointed chairman and CEO of MGT Capital Investments, a technology holding company. It initially said it would rename itself John McAfee Global Technologies, although this plan was abandoned due to a dispute with Intel over rights to the "McAfee" name.

He changed MGT's focus from social gaming to cybersecurity, saying "anti-virus software is dead, it no longer works," and that the new goal was to stop hackers before they could enter a network. To lead this pivot, McAfee recruited a technical team from Ontario, Canada, including Robert Rogers and Joshua Kowalchuk, whose firm Ontario High Speed Inc. provided the intellectual property for the company's new roadmap.

The team developed two main products: Sentinel, a hardware-based "honeypot" meant to detect intruders inside a network, and E-tagged, a device for tracking mobile phones and other 802.11 devices. E-tagged used passive ESSID probe request monitoring to track the physical movement of devices. By matching these wireless signals with CCTV footage, the system could identify and track specific individuals or groups based on the unique network names saved on their phones.

Soon after joining MGT, McAfee claimed his team exploited a flaw in the Android system to read encrypted WhatsApp messages. Gizmodo later reported he had sent reporters phones with malware already on them to make the hack work. McAfee replied that while the phones had malware, the story was about how it got there through a "serious flaw in the Android architecture."

In late 2016, the NYSE MKT refused to list the shares MGT needed to complete its purchase of technologies like D-Vasive, effectively stopping the deal. Consequently, the E-tagged project was sidelined to focus on the Sentinel rollout and Bitcoin mining, which McAfee believed was necessary for cybersecurity expertise. A separate project, ClearSkies, was eventually abandoned and labeled "vaporware" after it never materialized.

McAfee stepped down as CEO in August 2017 to become "chief cybersecurity visionary" before leaving MGT in January 2018 to focus on cryptocurrencies. Both sides described the split as amicable.

On 13 August 2018, McAfee took a position of CEO with Luxcore, a cryptocurrency company.

== Politics ==
=== Positions ===
McAfee advocated for the decriminalization of cannabis, an end to the war on drugs, non-interventionism in foreign policy, a free market economy which does not redistribute wealth, and upholding free trade. He supported abolishing the Transportation Security Administration.

McAfee advocated increased cyber awareness and more action against the threat of cyberwarfare. He pushed religious liberty, saying that business owners should be able to deny service in circumstances that contradict their religious beliefs, adding: "No one is forcing you to buy anything or to choose one person over another. So why should I be forced to do anything if I am not harming you? It's my choice to sell, your choice to buy."

McAfee contended that taxes were illegal, and claimed in 2019 that he had not filed a tax return since 2010. He referred to himself as "a prime target" of the Internal Revenue Service.

In July 2017, McAfee predicted on Twitter that the price of a bitcoin would jump to $500,000 within three years, adding: "If not, I will eat my own dick on national television." In July 2019, he predicted a price of $1 million by the end of 2020. In January 2020, he tweeted that his predictions were "a ruse to onboard new users," and that bitcoin had limited potential because it is "an ancient technology."

=== 2016 presidential campaign ===
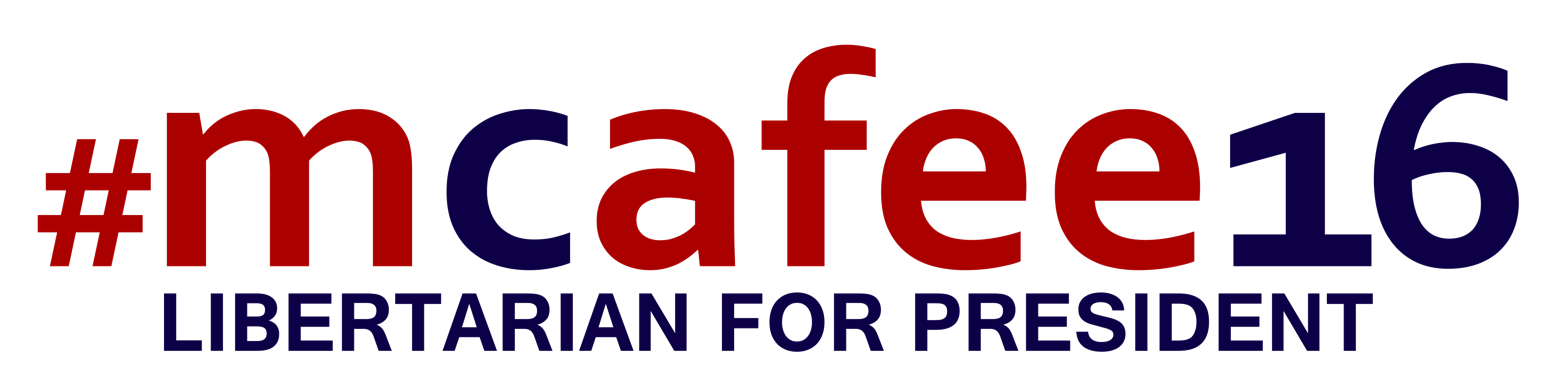
McAfee's 2016 campaign logo

On 8 September 2015, McAfee announced a bid for president of the United States in the 2016 presidential election, as the candidate of a newly formed political party called the Cyber Party. On 24 December 2015, he re-announced his candidacy bid saying that he would instead seek the presidential nomination of the Libertarian Party. On the campaign trail, he consistently polled alongside the party's other top candidates, Gary Johnson and Austin Petersen. The three partook in the Libertarian Party's first nationally televised presidential debate on 29 March 2016. His running mate was photographer, commercial real estate broker and Libertarian activist Judd Weiss.

McAfee came in second in the primaries and third at the 2016 Libertarian National Convention.

==== Notable endorsements ====
- Adam Kokesh, talk show host and activist
- John Moore, Nevada assemblyman
- L. Neil Smith, science fiction author and activist

=== 2020 presidential campaign ===
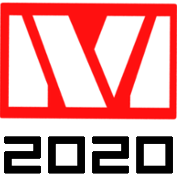
McAfee's 2020 campaign logo

Contrary to his assertion at the 2016 convention, McAfee tweeted on 3 June 2018 that he would run for president again in 2020, either with the Libertarian Party or a separate party that he would create. He later chose to run as a Libertarian. He mainly campaigned for wider cryptocurrency use.

On 22 January 2019, McAfee tweeted that he would continue his campaign "in exile," following reports that he, his wife, and four campaign staff were indicted for tax-related felonies by the IRS. He said he was in "international waters," and had previously tweeted that he was going to Venezuela. The IRS has not commented on the alleged indictments. He defended Marxist revolutionary Che Guevara on Twitter, putting himself at odds with Libertarian National Committee chairman Nicholas Sarwark, who wrote, "I hear very little buzz about McAfee this time around ... making a defense of Che Guevara from Cuba may ingratiate him with the Cuban government, but it didn't resonate well with Libertarians."

In a tweet on 4 March 2020, McAfee simultaneously suspended his 2020 presidential campaign, endorsed Vermin Supreme, and announced his campaign for the Libertarian Party vice presidential nomination. The next day, he returned to the presidential field, reversing the suspension of his bid, as "No one in the Libertarian Party Would consider me For Vice President." The next month, he endorsed Adam Kokesh and became Kokesh's vice-presidential candidate, while still seeking the presidency for himself. At the 2020 Libertarian National Convention, McAfee failed to qualify for the vice-presidential nomination.

== Legal issues ==
McAfee was named a defendant in a 2008 civil court case related to his Aerotrekking light-sport aircraft venture and the death of nephew Joel Bitow and a passenger.

On 30 April 2012, McAfee's property in Orange Walk Town, Belize, was raided by the Gang Suppression Unit of the Belize Police Department. A GSU press release said he was arrested for unlicensed drug manufacturing and possession of an unlicensed weapon. He was released without charge. In December 2012, McAfee told a Wired reporter that from 2010 to 2011 he had made several posts to the drug discussion forum Bluelight discussing his use and manufacturing of the stimulant drug MDPV under the alias 'Stuffmonger'. As of March 2024, the Stuffmonger account had made 220 posts on the site in 2010 and early 2011.

In 2012, Belize police spokesman Raphael Martinez confirmed that McAfee was neither convicted nor charged, only suspected.

In January 2014, while in Canada, he said that when the Belizean government raided his property, it seized his assets, and that his house later burned down under suspicious circumstances.

On 2 August 2015, McAfee was arrested in Henderson County, Tennessee, on one count of driving under the influence and one count of possession of a firearm while intoxicated.

In July 2019, McAfee and members of his entourage were arrested while his yacht was docked at Puerto Plata, Dominican Republic, on suspicion of carrying high-caliber weapons and ammunition. They were held for four days and released. Weapons were seized, according to the Public Ministry.

On 11 August 2020, McAfee falsely stated that he was arrested in Norway during the COVID-19 pandemic after refusing to replace a lace thong with a more effective face mask. He later tweeted a picture of himself with a bruised eye, claiming it occurred during this arrest. A photo of the alleged arrest shows an officer with the German word for "police" on his uniform, ostensibly invalidating McAfee's claim of having been arrested in Norway. The Augsburg police later said he tried to enter Germany on that day, but was not arrested.

=== Death of Gregory Faull ===
On 12 November 2012, Belize police began to search for McAfee as a person of interest in connection to the homicide investigation of American immigrant Gregory Viant Faull, who was found dead of a gunshot wound the day before, at his home on the island of Ambergris Caye, the largest island in Belize. Faull was a neighbor of McAfee's. In a contemporary interview with Wired, McAfee said he had been afraid police would kill him and refused their routine questions and evaded them. He buried himself in sand for several hours with a cardboard box over his head. Belize's prime minister, Dean Barrow, called him "extremely paranoid, even bonkers". He fled Belize rather than cooperate.

In December 2012, the magazine Vice accidentally gave away McAfee's location at a Guatemalan resort, when a photo taken by one of its journalists accompanying him was posted with the Exif geolocation metadata still attached.

While in Guatemala, McAfee asked Chad Essley, an American cartoonist and animator, to set up a blog so he could write about his experience while on the run. He then appeared publicly in Guatemala City, where he unsuccessfully sought political asylum.

On 5 December 2012, he was arrested for illegally entering Guatemala. Shortly afterward, the board reviewing his asylum plea denied it and he was taken to a detention center to await deportation to Belize.

On 6 December 2012, Reuters and ABC News reported that McAfee had two minor heart attacks in the detention center and was hospitalized. His lawyer said he had no heart attacks, rather high blood pressure and anxiety attacks. McAfee later said he faked the heart attacks to buy time for his attorney to file a series of appeals that ultimately prevented his deportation to Belize, thus hastening that government's decision to send him back to the United States.

On 12 December 2012, McAfee was released and deported to the United States.

On 14 November 2018, the Circuit Court in Orlando, Florida, refused to dismiss a wrongful death lawsuit against him for Faull's death. McAfee did not appear in court, lost the case by default and was ordered to pay $25 million to Faull's estate.

=== U.S. tax evasion charges and planned extradition ===
In January 2019, McAfee announced that he was on the run from U.S. authorities, and living internationally on a boat following the convening of a grand jury to indict him, his wife, and four of his 2020 Libertarian Party presidential primaries staff on tax evasion charges. At the time, the Internal Revenue Service had not independently confirmed the existence of any such indictment.

On 5 October 2020, McAfee was arrested in Spain at the request of the United States Department of Justice for tax evasion. The June indictment, which was unsealed upon his arrest, alleged he earned millions of dollars from 2014 to 2018, and failed to file income tax returns.

On 6 October, the U.S. Securities and Exchange Commission (SEC) filed a complaint further alleging McAfee and his bodyguard promoted certain initial coin offerings (ICOs) in a fraudulent cryptocurrency pump and dump scheme. It claims he presented himself as an impartial investor when he promoted the ICOs, despite allegedly getting paid $23 million in digital assets in return.

On 5 March 2021, the U.S. Attorney's Office for the Southern District of New York formally indicted him and an executive adviser on these charges.

McAfee was jailed in Spain, pending extradition to the United States.

On 23 June 2021, the Spanish National Court authorized his extradition to face charges in Tennessee; McAfee is suspected of having committed suicide several hours after the authorization, though the official ruling has come under suspicion by the public, as McAfee made clear he had no intention of committing suicide by his tweet from 2019. The tweet, posted in November 2019, said: "Getting subtle messages from U.S. officials saying, in effect: 'We're coming for you McAfee! We're going to kill yourself'. I got a tattoo today just in case. If I suicide myself, I didn't. I was whackd. Check my right arm." It included a photo of a tattoo that said "$WHACKD." The New York extradition case was still pending in a lower Spanish court.

== Personal life ==
McAfee married three times. He met his first wife, Fran, circa 1968 while he was working towards a doctorate at Northeast Louisiana State College and she was an 18-year-old undergraduate student. Their affair led to his expulsion from the college. He married his second wife, Judy, a former flight attendant at American Airlines, circa 1987; they divorced in 2002.

The night after McAfee arrived in the United States after being deported from Guatemala in December 2012, he was solicited by and slept with Janice Dyson, then a prostitute 30 years his junior in South Beach, Miami Beach, Florida. They began a relationship and married in 2013. She claims that he saved her from human traffickers. The couple moved to Portland, Oregon in 2013.

In a 2012 article in Mensa Bulletin, the magazine of the American Mensa, McAfee said developing the first commercial antivirus program had made him "the most popular hacking target" and "[h]ackers see hacking me as a badge of honor." For his own cybersecurity, he said he had other people buy his computer equipment for him, used pseudonyms for setting up computers and logins, and changed his IP address several times a day. When asked on another occasion if he personally used McAfee's antivirus software, he replied: "I take it off [...] it's too annoying."

According to a 2016 article, McAfee had been using the then-legal drug alpha-PHP which he imported from China and which may have caused his paranoia. McAfee reportedly previously used the stimulant drug MDPV beginning in 2010, and was a member of the online drug discussion forum Bluelight.

In 2015, he resided in Lexington, Tennessee.

In December 2018, he tweeted that he had "47 genetic children." His third wife described him in a Father's Day message as "father of many, loved by few."

== Death ==
On 23 June 2021, McAfee was found dead in his prison cell, hours after the Spanish National Court ordered his extradition to the United States on criminal charges filed in Tennessee by the United States Department of Justice Tax Division. The Catalan Justice Department said "everything indicates" he killed himself by hanging. An official autopsy confirmed his suicide. A Spanish court also ruled McAfee died by suicide.

McAfee's death ignited speculation and conspiracy theories about the possibility that he was murdered. Such speculation was particularly fueled by a 2019 post McAfee made on Twitter that read, in part, "If I suicide myself, I didn't. I was whackd [sic]." McAfee's death drew comparisons to the circumstances of the death of American financier Jeffrey Epstein, who was found dead in August 2019 while awaiting trial on sex trafficking charges. Several times, McAfee said if he were ever found dead by hanging, it would mean he was murdered. The day after his death, his lawyer told reporters that he regularly maintained contact with McAfee in prison and saw no signs of suicidal intent. McAfee's widow reaffirmed this position in her first public remarks since her husband's death, and also called for a "thorough" investigation.

On 14 December 2023, the morgue delivered McAfee's body to his family to be taken to the United States for his funeral. Until then, it had been kept in a refrigerator at the Justice City of Barcelona.

In a November 2023 interview with Cointelegraph, McAfee's widow Janice McAfee said that he died without a will or estate which left her without any money and that she was working odd jobs to make ends meet.

In January 2025, McAfee's X (formerly Twitter) account became active announcing the launch of a meme coin cryptocurrency and a chatbot, both called 'AIntivirus'. A day later McAfee's widow Janice McAfee, who had access to the account, wrote that his account was not hacked and that the meme coin and chatbot were created to "honor John's legacy and his memory", which generated a number of critical responses over it being a potential scam. As of January 2025, the AIntivirus coin has a market capitalization of $37 million, though the Antivirus X account was later suspended.

== In the media ==
Showtime released the 2016 documentary film Gringo: The Dangerous Life of John McAfee, which raised numerous allegations about his life in Belize, from the sexual assault of his QuorumEx business partner Allison Adonizio, to ordering the murders of Belizean David Middleton and American expat Gregory Faull. In a September 2016 interview with Bloomberg's Pimm Fox and Kathleen Hayes, McAfee maintained the film's incidents were fabricated, claiming "Belize is a third-world banana republic and you can go down there and make any story you want if you pay your interviewees, which Showtime did."

Glenn Ficarra and John Requa stated in 2017 they would direct a film about McAfee titled King of the Jungle, written by Scott Alexander and Larry Karaszewski. At various points, Johnny Depp, Michael Keaton, and Seth Rogen were reported to have taken roles and later to have left the project. Zac Efron was reported to star as journalist Ari Furman.

ABC News series 20/20 interviewed McAfee and his wife in 2017 regarding Faull's murder.

The 2022 documentary film Running with the Devil: The Wild World of John McAfee includes footage from an unreleased documentary by Vice, and interviews by Rocco Castoro, Alex Cody Foster, and Robert King.

The character of Mr. Boss in the Adult Swim animated series Smiling Friends was partially based on McAfee.

== Books ==
- Computer Viruses, Worms, Data Diddlers, Killer Programs, and Other Threats to Your System. What They Are, How They Work, and How to Defend Your PC, Mac, or Mainframe, (with Colin Haynes) St. Martin's Press, 1989
- The Secret of the Yamas: Spiritual Guide to Yoga, McAfee Pub, 2001
- The Fabric of Self: Meditations on Vanity and Love, Woodland Publications, 2001
- Into the Heart of Truth, Woodland Publications, 2001
- Beyond the Siddhis. Supernatural Powers and the Sutras of Patanjali, Woodland Publications, 2001

== Documentary films ==
- Gringo: The Dangerous Life of John McAfee
- Running with the Devil: The Wild World of John McAfee

== See also ==
- List of unsolved murders in Belize – including Faull's
