= Everykey =

American cybersecurity company

Everykey Inc
- Type: Private
- Industry: Cybersecurity
- Founder: Chris Wentz
- Headquarters: United States
- Area served: Worldwide
- Key people: Chris Wentz (CEO); John McAfee (Chief Evangelist); Ahmad Al Hidiq (CTO); McKelvey Packard (COO)
- Website: everykey.com

Everykey is an American company that patented a universal smart key that can unlock devices, and log into online accounts on those devices. The idea began as an entrepreneurship project at Case Western Reserve University.

== Products ==
The company's debut product was an electronic wristband designed to replace keys and passwords. Development of the prototype into a working product was funded by a Kickstarter campaign. The current product, resembling a USB thumb drive that can be inserted into a wristband accessory, was funded by an Indiegogo crowdfunding campaign. The software enables Everykey to work with a variety of computer and mobile platforms. Everykey currently offers the thumb-drive style product as well as: a Key Ring Accessory, Band Accessory, Charging Cable, and Bluetooth Dongle.

== Technology ==
Everykey is a Bluetooth device that can communicate securely with an unlimited number of other Bluetooth devices, simultaneously. The Everykey device uses a patented method including AES and RSA encryption, to allow the user to unlock their devices and login to online accounts without having to type passwords. When the user leaves with an Everykey device, the app locks everything back down and logs out of online accounts. Everykey’s patented method allows it to perform unlocking and locking actions without plugging in the device.

== Crowdfunding campaign ==
Everykey launched a Kickstarter campaign on October 29, 2014. Within 48 hours, the campaign reached trending status and raised over $25,000 in pre-orders. The project quickly gained attention; Everykey launched another crowdfunding campaign on Indiegogo with John McAfee on December 7, 2015. While some media outlets such as Wired and TechCrunch were excited about the traction, they also expressed concern over the security versus convenience factor of the product. Writers at Business Insider focused more on the vision of the company, exploring Everykey’s future plans and classroom origin story.

== Perception ==
Many were skeptical about Everykey’s legitimacy due to the company’s delayed shipment to early doners. John McAfee’s involvement as the company’s brand ambassador was controversial, with some being concerned and others elated regarding his involvement. As a response, the company hosted a r/IAmA style open forum on Reddit so anyone could ask about topics ranging from security to late delivery. Everykey has since addressed many of the initial concerns, and is now selling their products with retailers such as Best Buy, Newegg, and Office Depot.

== Competitors ==
In the password managers market, Everykey competes with: LastPass, 1Password, and Dashlane. In the hardware security key market, Everykey's competitors include Nymi and YubiKey.

== Awards ==
Everykey has been recognized by many local and state organizations for the CEO’s pitch style and grassroots backstory:

- ProtoTech 1st Place
- LaunchTown 1st Place
- North Coast Opportunities Technologies Fund Award
- FUND Conference 1st Place
- Best Startup Culture in Ohio, Finalist
- Morgenthaler-Pavey Startup Competition 1st Place
