= List of ministers of justice of Catalonia =

Minister of Justice of Catalonia
- Conseller de Justícia de Catalunya
- Seal of the Generalitat of Catalonia

- Flag of Catalonia

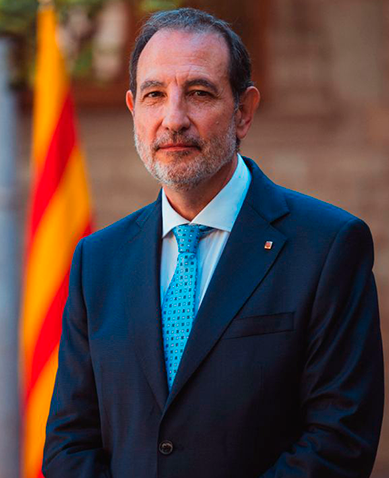
- Incumbent; Ramon Espadaler since 12 August 2024
- Department of Justice and Democratic Quality
- Member of: Executive Council of Catalonia
- Reports to: President of Catalonia
- Seat: Barcelona
- Appointer: President of Catalonia
- Inaugural holder: Pere Comas i Calvet
- Formation: 28 April 1931
- Website: Department of Justice, Catalonia

Established in 1931, the Councilor of Justice (Catalan: Conseller de Justícia, Spanish: Consejero de Justicia) of the Government of Catalonia is the highest representative of the Department of Justice.

The Center for Legal Studies and Specialized Training and the Center for Contemporary History remain attached to the department.

== Functions ==
The functions of the Department of Justice correspond to:

- The functions related to the Justice Administration in Catalonia and its modernization.
- Penitentiary services, rehabilitation and juvenile justice.
- The conservation, updating and development of civil law in Catalonia.
- Associations, foundations, professional colleges and academies.
- Notaries and registrars.
- The promotion and development of alternative means of conflict resolution.
- Religious affairs
- The democratic memory, the promotion of peace and political and civil human rights.
- The regulation and supervision of interest groups.
- Any other attributed to you by law and other provisions.

== List of ministers ==
Name	Portrait	Party	Took office	Left office	President	Ministerial title
Pere Comas i Calvet		Republican Left of Catalonia	28 April 1931	20 November 1932	Francesc Macià	Minister of Justice and Law
Pere Comas i Calvet		Republican Left of Catalonia	19 December 1932	24 January 1933	Francesc Macià	Minister of Justice and Law
Pere Coromines i Montanya		Republican Left of Catalonia	24 January 1933	3 January 1934	Francesc Macià	Minister of Justice and Law
Joan Lluhí		National Left Republican Party	3 January 1934	13 October 1934	Lluís Companys	Minister of Justice
Joan Lluhí		National Left Republican Party	1 March 1936	26 May 1936	Lluís Companys	Minister of Justice
Pere Comas i Calvet		Republican Left of Catalonia	26 May 1936	31 July 1936	Lluís Companys	Minister of Justice
Josep Quero i Molares		Republican Left of Catalonia	31 July 1936	26 September 1936	Lluís Companys	Minister of Justice
Andreu Nin Pérez		Workers' Party of Marxist Unification	26 September 1936	17 December 1936	Lluís Companys	Minister of Justice
Rafael Vidiella		Unified Socialist Party of Catalonia	17 December 1936	3 April 1937	Lluís Companys	Minister of Justice
Joan Comorera		Unión General de Trabajadores	3 April 1937	16 April 1937	Lluís Companys	Minister of Work, Public Works and Justice
Joan Comorera		Unión General de Trabajadores	16 April 1937	5 May 1937	Lluís Companys	Minister of Justice
Rafael Vidiella		Unión General de Trabajadores	5 May 1937	29 June 1937	Lluís Companys	Minister of Work, Public Works, Justice and Supplies
Pere Bosch-Gimpera		Catalan Republican Action	29 June 1937	2 February 1939	Lluís Companys	Minister of Justice
Ignasi de Gispert i Jordà		Democratic Union of Catalonia	8 May 1980	24 August 1982	Jordi Pujol	Minister of Justice
Agustí Bassols i Parés		Democratic Union of Catalonia	24 August 1982	9 May 1986	Jordi Pujol	Minister of Justice
Joaquim Xicoy i Bassegoda		Democratic Union of Catalonia	9 May 1986	4 July 1988	Jordi Pujol	Minister of Justice
Agustí Bassols i Parés		Democratic Union of Catalonia	4 July 1988	22 December 1992	Jordi Pujol	Minister of Justice
Antoni Isac i Aguilar		Democratic Union of Catalonia	22 December 1992	1 February 1995	Jordi Pujol	Minister of Justice
Núria de Gispert		Democratic Union of Catalonia	1 February 1995	5 February 2001	Jordi Pujol	Minister of Justice
Josep-Delfí Guàrdia i Canela		Democratic Union of Catalonia	5 February 2001	4 November 2002	Jordi Pujol	Minister of Justice
Núria de Gispert		Democratic Union of Catalonia	4 November 2002	17 December 2003	Jordi Pujol	Minister of Justice and the Interior
Josep Maria Vallès		Citizens for Change	17 December 2003	29 November 2006	Pasqual Maragall	Minister of Justice
Montserrat Tura		Socialists' Party of Catalonia	29 November 2006	29 December 2010	José Montilla	Minister of Justice
Pilar Fernández i Bozal		Independent	29 December 2010	27 December 2012	Artur Mas	Minister of Justice
Germà Gordó i Aubarell		Democratic Convergence of Catalonia	27 December 2012	14 January 2016	Artur Mas	Minister of Justice
Carles Mundó		Republican Left of Catalonia	14 January 2016	28 October 2017	Carles Puigdemont	Minister of Justice
Ester Capella		Republican Left of Catalonia	2 June 2018	26 May 2021	Quim Torra	Minister of Justice
Lourdes Ciuró		Together for Catalonia	26 May 2021	10 October 2022	Pere Aragonès	Minister of Justice
Gemma Ubasart		Independent	10 October 2022	12 August 2024	Pere Aragonès	Minister of Justice, Rights and Memory
Ramon Espadaler		United to Advance	12 August 2024	Incumbent	Salvador Illa	Minister of Justice and Democratic Quality

== See also ==
- Department of Justice of the Generalitat de Catalunya
- Justice ministry
- Ministry of Justice of Spain
- Politics of Catalonia
- Public Prosecutor of the Autonomous Communities of Spain
- Spanish Attorney General
