= Secretary of State for Justice (Spain) =

Official of the Ministry of Justice of the Government of Spain

- Secretario de Estado de Justicia
- Coat of Arms used by the Government

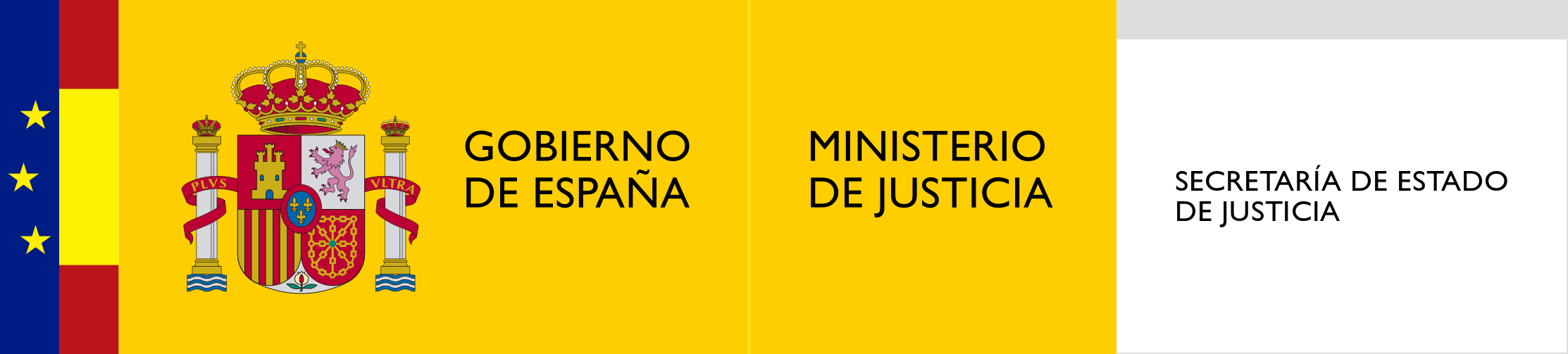

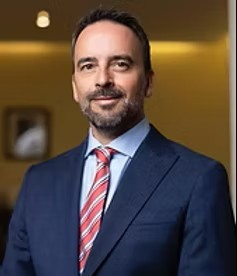
- Incumbent; Manuel Olmedo Palacios since 29 November 2023
- Ministry of Justice; Secretariat of State for Justice
- Style: The Most Excellent (formal); Mrs. Secretary of State (informal)
- Abbreviation: SEJUS
- Nominator: The Minister of Justice
- Appointer: The Monarch
- Formation: 13 May 1994; 32 years ago
- First holder: María Teresa Fernández de la Vega
- Website: mjusticia.gob.es

The secretary of state for justice (SEJUS) is a senior minister in the Spanish Ministry of the Presidency, Justice and Relations with the Cortes responsible for the government policy regarding justice.

In this regard, the secretary of state assists the minister in the design of this policy and in the institutional relations with the bodies related to justice (General Council of the Judiciary, Prosecution Ministry, courts of justice, regional ministries of justice and with associations related to legal professions). It also supports the minister in all related to development of the legal system, international legal cooperation and civil registration.

The secretary of state for justice is appointed by the monarch on the advice of the justice minister, after hearing the Council of Ministers. Since November 29, 2023, the officeholder is judge Manuel Olmedo Palacios.

== History ==
The Secretariat of State for Justice was created on 13 May 1994, when the ministries of Justice and the Interior were merged. The Secretariat was organized through a General Secretariat for Justice and several directorates general (Judicial Infrastructure; Registries and Notaries; State Legal Service—current Solicitor General—, Conscientious Objection; Codification and International Legal Cooperation; Religious Affairs).

As of 1996, the restored Directorate-General for Relations with the Administration of Justice was integrated into it and the cabinet of religious affairs was elevated to the rank of directorate-general. Likewise, the General Secretariat of Justice was abolished and the Judicial Studies Center and the Judicial General Mutuality were assigned to the Secretariat of State for Justice. The structure of the department was not touched again until 2001 when the Directorate-General for the Modernization of the Administration of Justice was created in its midst.

Except for certain changes between its directorates-general, its structure was not modified until 2008, in which the General Secretariat for Modernization and Relations with the Administration of Justice (current SGAJ) was created as an intermediate body between the Secretary of State and some of its addresses general.

In 2010, it underwent its most relevant modification and is still preserved today. The Solicitor General and the Directorate General of Registries and Notaries were directly attached to the Minister and the Secretary of State assumed the competences over international legal cooperation. In 2015, the Office of Asset Recovery and Management (ORGA) was created and assigned to the Secretary of State. As of 2018, the powers of the ORGA are assumed by the Secretary-General for the Administration of Justice (SGAJ).

In 2020, the new justice minister, Juan Carlos Campo, renamed all the Ministry's departments. Despite the name change of the Secretariat of State's bodies, the responsibilities were the same, with the exception of those relating to religious freedom, which were transferred from the Directorate-General for International Legal Cooperation, Relations with Religions, and Human Rights to the Undersecretariat of the Presidency, and the legal security and notaries responsibilities, which were transferred from the Undersecretariat of Justice to the Secretariat of State.

== Organization ==
As of 2026, this is the organization of the Secretariat of State:

Secretariat of State Organization (2026)
Secretary of State	Cabinet (Chief of Staff)
Secretary of State	Centre for Legal Studies
Secretary of State	General Mutual Benefit Society for the Personnel of the Administration of Justice
General Secretariat for Innovation and Quality of the Public Justice Service	Technical Cabinet
General Secretariat for Innovation and Quality of the Public Justice Service	Directorate-General for Efficiency of the Public Justice Service
General Secretariat for Innovation and Quality of the Public Justice Service	Directorate-General for Digital Transformation of the Administration of Justice
General Secretariat for Innovation and Quality of the Public Justice Service	Directorate-General for Legal Certainty and Public Attestation
General Secretariat for Innovation and Quality of the Public Justice Service	Deputy Directorate-General for Innovation and Quality of the Judicial Administrative Office
Directorate-General for International Legal Cooperation	Deputy Directorate-General for International Legal Cooperation
Directorate-General for International Legal Cooperation	Deputy Directorate-General for EU Justice Affairs and International Organizations

== List of secretaries of state ==
For the purpose of this list, the date used is the date on which the decree of appointment or dismissal received royal assent, which may differ from the date of publication or of the effective taking of office.

Name	Term of Office			Government		Ref.
Name	Start	End	Dura	Prime Minister	Monarch	Ref.
María Teresa Fernández de la Vega (born 1949)	13 May 1994	7 May 1996	1 year, 360 days	Felipe González (1982–1996)	Juan Carlos I (1975–2014)	
José Luis González Montes (born 1947)	10 May 1996	5 May 2000	3 years, 361 days	José María Aznar (1996–2004)	Juan Carlos I (1975–2014)	
José María Michavila (born 1960)	5 May 2000	12 July 2002	2 years, 68 days	José María Aznar (1996–2004)	Juan Carlos I (1975–2014)	
Rafael Catalá (born 1961)	26 July 2002	19 April 2004	1 year, 268 days	José María Aznar (1996–2004)	Juan Carlos I (1975–2014)	
Luis López Guerra (born 1947)	19 April 2004	16 February 2007	2 years, 303 days	José Luis Rodríguez Zapatero (2004–2011)	Juan Carlos I (1975–2014)	
Julio Pérez Hernández (born 1950)	16 February 2007	27 February 2009	2 years, 11 days	José Luis Rodríguez Zapatero (2004–2011)	Juan Carlos I (1975–2014)	
Juan Carlos Campo (born 1961)	27 February 2009	30 December 2011	2 years, 306 days	José Luis Rodríguez Zapatero (2004–2011)	Juan Carlos I (1975–2014)	
Fernando Román García (born 1960)	30 December 2011	10 October 2014	2 years, 284 days	Mariano Rajoy (2011–2018)	Juan Carlos I (1975–2014)	
Fernando Román García (born 1960)	30 December 2011	10 October 2014	2 years, 284 days	Mariano Rajoy (2011–2018)	Felipe VI (2014–present)	
Carmen Sánchez-Cortés Martín (born 1965)	10 October 2014	18 June 2018	3 years, 251 days	Mariano Rajoy (2011–2018)	Felipe VI (2014–present)	
Manuel-Jesús Dolz Lago	18 June 2018	29 January 2020	1 year, 225 days	Pedro Sánchez (2018–)	Felipe VI (2014–present)	
Pablo Zapatero Miguel (born 1972)	29 January 2020	7 December 2021	1 year, 312 days	Pedro Sánchez (2018–)	Felipe VI (2014–present)	
Antonio Julián Rodríguez Esquerdo (born 1962)	7 December 2021	28 November 2023	1 year, 356 days	Pedro Sánchez (2018–)	Felipe VI (2014–present)	
Manuel Olmedo Palacios (born 1976)	28 November 2023	Incumbent	2 years, 295 days	Pedro Sánchez (2018–)	Felipe VI (2014–present)	
