= Gemma Ubasart =

Spanish political scientist

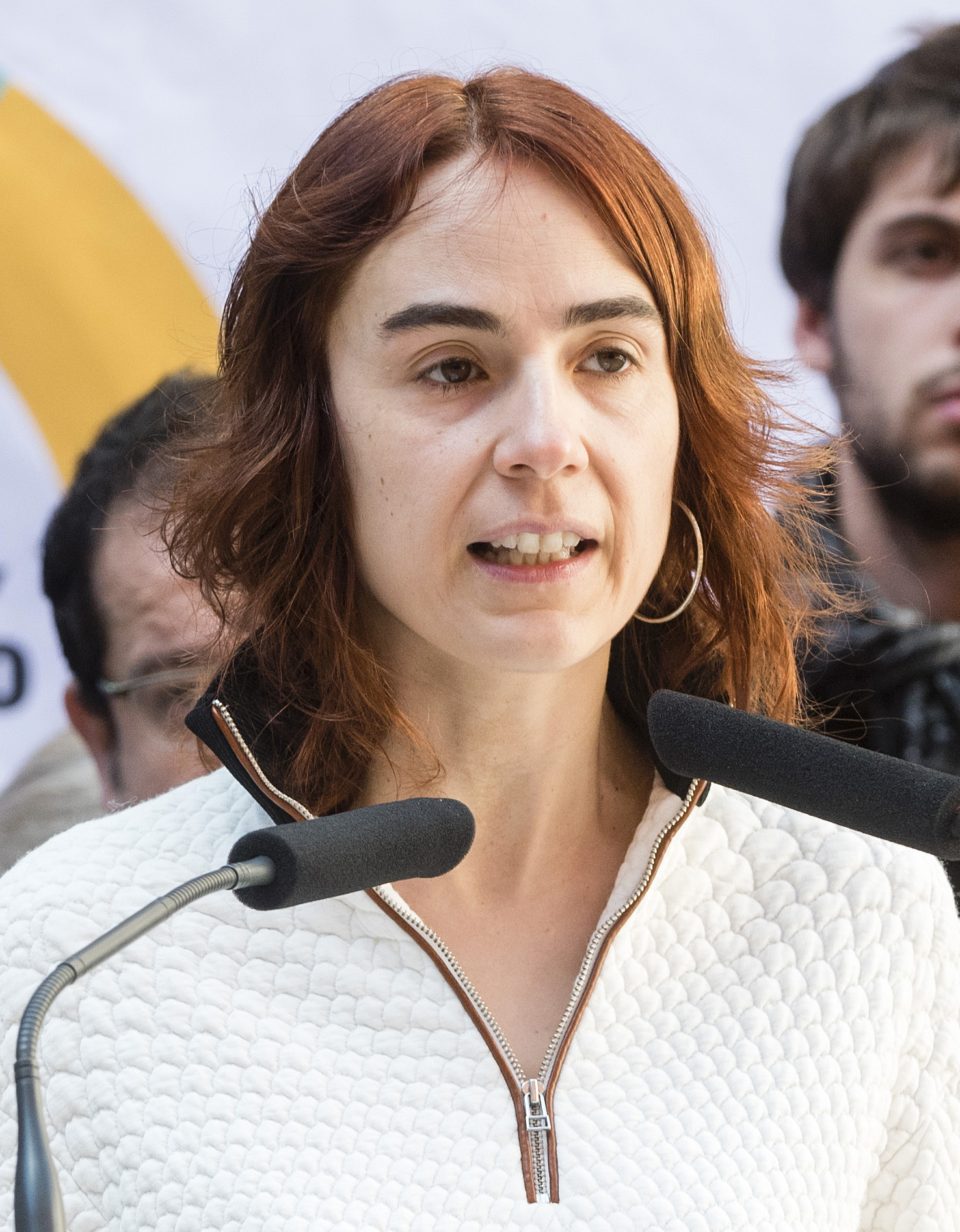

Minister of Justice, Rights and Memory of Catalonia
- In office 10 October 2022 – 12 August 2024
- President: Pere Aragonès
- Preceded by: Lourdes Ciuró
- Succeeded by: Ramon Espadaler

Personal details
- Born: 15 August 1978 (age 48) Castellar del Vallès, Spain
- Scientific career
- Education: University of Barcelona; Autonomous University of Barcelona
- Fields: Political science
- Workplaces: Autonomous University of Madrid; University of Girona; Autonomous University of Barcelona

Gemma Ubasart González is a Spanish political scientist and politician. She served as Minister of Justice, Rights and Memory of Catalonia between October 2022 and August 2024, as city councilor in Castellar del Vallès, secretary for international affairs and public policies for change in Podemos, and secretary general of Podemos in Catalonia in 2015.

== Career ==
Ubasart attended the Autonomous University of Barcelona, where she graduated with a PhD. She also obtained a graduate degree in the penal system and human rights at the University of Barcelona, as well as a postgraduate degree in applied social research and data analysis. She became a professor at the University of Girona, and has also been a professor at the Autonomous University of Madrid.

In the 2007 Spanish local elections, she was elected to the city council of her municipality, affiliated with the L'Altraveu per Castellar (es). In November 2014 she was elected a member of the Citizen Council of Podemos, and joined the Coordination Council of Pablo Iglesias Turrión as secretary of international affairs and public policies for change. In February 2015, she was elected secretary general of Podemos in Catalonia, and she held that position until October 10, 2015.
