= PowWow (chat program) =

Internet instant message and chat program

- Developer: Tribal Voice
- Release: December 1994; 31 years ago
- Final release: 4.2.2 / October 2000; 26 years ago
- Operating system: Windows
- Type: Instant messaging client
- Website: www.tribal.com (archived)

PowWow was one of the first instant messaging and chat programs for Windows. It was made by a company called Tribal Voice, Inc.

== Features ==
Many of the features found in contemporary instant messaging programs were first introduced in PowWow. The program also had several innovative features such as allowing users to talk with each other using VoIP, a shared whiteboard, a built-in speech synthesizer, WAV sound file playing, offline transmittal of instant messages via POP/SMTP, and the ability for users to share their web surfing experience concurrently by redirecting either party to a new URL when another navigates elsewhere. It also had built-in file transfer with a simple drag-and-drop interface to make file sharing very easy.

== History ==
The company was founded in Woodland Park, Colorado, United States, at the end of 1994, by the software millionaire John McAfee, founder of McAfee Associates (later called McAfee or Intel Security Group). At first, the company described itself, especially on its web site, as a 'Native American' company run by Native Americans. As the company grew, the Native American references gradually disappeared.

The company eventually located its corporate headquarters in Scotts Valley, California.

In the late 1990s, Tribal Voice began to OEM the PowWow software in order to increase market share. While most of these deals were insubstantial, several were with high-profile companies, including AT&T's WorldNet Internet service provider (ISP), search engine/portal AltaVista, and Freeserve, a United Kingdom-based ISP.

PowWow was one of the first instant messaging programs to provide interoperability between multiple instant messaging clients, being compatible with both AOL Instant Messenger (AIM) and Microsoft's MSN Messenger.

In the late 1990s, AOL sued Tribal Voice for use of the phrase 'buddy list' and made repeated efforts to block interoperability between their instant messaging client and Tribal Voice's, as well as those of other companies.

In 1998, original founder McAfee brought in Joseph Esposito, formerly the president and CEO of Encyclopædia Britannica, to run the company.

In 1999, the company was acquired by dot-com incubator CMGI, who moved the company's development center from Woodland Park to Colorado Springs, Colorado, and closed the Scotts Valley office. In 2000, CMGI merged the company into CMGIon, a division of CMGI, founded with help from Sun Microsystems and Novell. In January 2001, CMGIon closed its Colorado Springs office, the former Tribal Voice.

In late 2000, Tribal Voice announced PowWow will end on January 19th, 2001 because it couldn't attract new users. They stated "Please be advised that PowWow will no longer be supported as of January 19th, 2001. The PowWow instant messaging product, services and communities will not be available as of that date. Please take the time to find a new service before January 19, 2001, to ensure no disruption in your instant messaging, chat and community services."

== Bibliography ==
- "Inside Interactive Travel, story about using PowWow to create online travel communities". Archived from the original on 2006-02-22.
- "Article about AOL suing Tribal Voice". internetnews.com. 1999.
- "AT&T WorldNet selects PowWow for IM client". Computergram International. December 16, 1998. Archived from the original on January 21, 2005 – via FindArticles.
- "AltaVista selects PowWow for IM client". Computergram International. Archived from the original on March 21, 2005 – via FindArticles.
- "CMGIon acquires Tribal Voice". internetnews.com. 2000.
- "CMGIon drops PowWow". CNet. 2000. Archived from the original on 2011-05-17.
