= Robert King (photojournalist) =

American journalist

- Born: Robert Whitfield King; May 25, 1969; Memphis, Tennessee, USA
- Occupation(s): War correspondent Photojournalist filmmaker Creative Director art director
- Website: http://www.fotoking.com

Robert King (born May 25, 1969) is an American independent photo and video journalist. He has covered conflict areas and war zones since 1991. King was the subject of the 2008 documentary Blood Trail, re-released in 2009 as Shooting Robert King.

== Early life ==
He attended the Pratt Institute, where he got his first photo publication in the New York Times as a junior.

== Career ==
After graduation from the Pratt Institute, King became a war photojournalist in Iraq, with later work in Sarajevo, Chechnya, Afghanistan, Albania, Rwanda, and Syria. His first newspaper cover photo was for The Guardian in 1993. He was the only photojournalist on the ground during the fall of Grozny. His photographs were used for covers of Newsweek, Life, and Time.

In 2008, a documentary covering his activities over the course of 15 years was released. Blood Trail, later known as Shooting Robert King, premiered at the Toronto International Film Festival.

In 2012, King became the director of photography for Vice Media. His work at Vice is most closely associated with his coverage of software pioneer and fugitive John McAfee, which has been criticized as being too friendly and inadvertently aiding in McAfee's arrest in Guatemala, an allegation King denies. In 2015, BuzzFeed News reporting placed the blame for McAfee's capture on Vice editor-in-chief, Jonathan Smith, and found that King had not been responsible.

In 2014, King moved to Berlin, Germany and became the creative director of video for Bild.de

As of June 2018, he operates a farm in Tennessee and was serving as McAfee's official documentarian prior to McAfee's death. His work is extensively featured in the 2022 documentary Running With the Devil: The Wild World of John McAfee.
