= Rocco Castoro =

American editor and writer (born 1982)

- Born: January 23, 1982 (age 43); United States
- Education: University of Florida (BS)
- Occupations: Writer, editor, documentary and scripted producer, host
- Known for: Running With the Devil: The Wild World of John McAfee
- Movement: New journalism Immersion journalism

Rocco Castoro (born January 23, 1982) is an American editor and writer. He graduated from the University of Florida with a degree in journalism. After serving as an associate editor at Satellite magazine, he joined Vice magazine in 2006 as an editorial intern and was appointed editor-in-chief in March 2011, leaving Vice in 2015. In October 2018, Castoro joined Collider as Creative Director of Collider Studios.

In 2020, Castoro became editor-in-chief of SCNR, an online channel partly funded by commentator Tim Pool. SCNR later collapsed following the 2021 United States Capitol attack. Castoro's reporting on John McAfee makes him a predominant part of the 2022 documentary Running With the Devil: The Wild World of John McAfee.
