= Ester Capella =

Spanish lawyer and politician (born 1963)

The Honourable Ester Capella
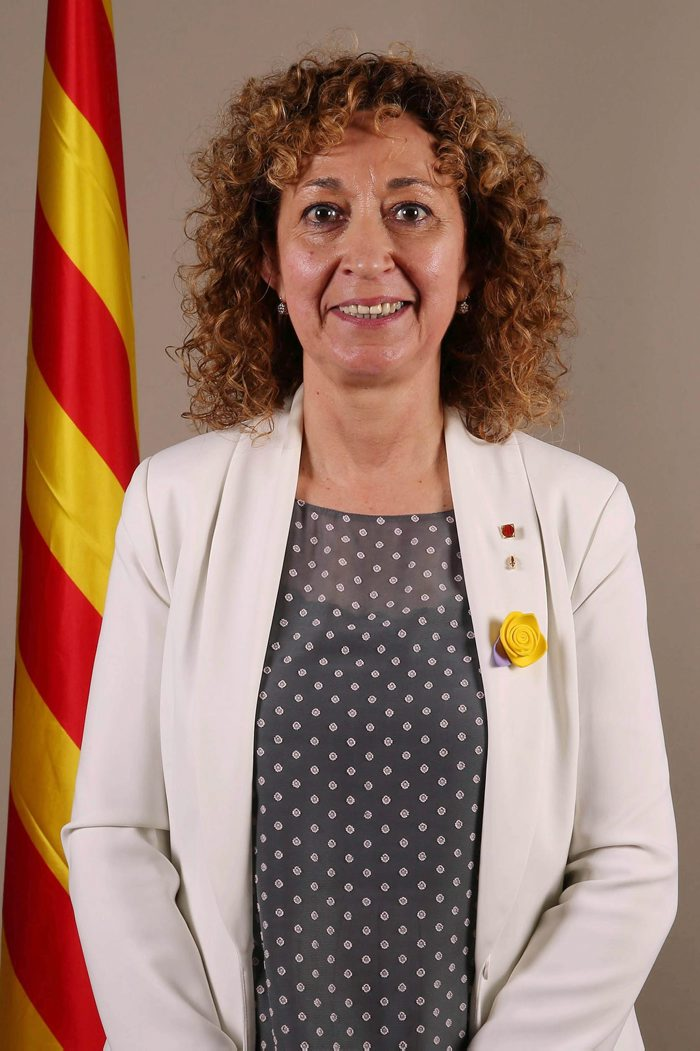
- Capella in June 2018

Minister of Territory of Catalonia
- In office 12 June 2023 – 12 August 2024
- President: Pere Aragonès
- Preceded by: Damià Calvet
- Succeeded by: Sílvia Paneque

Delegate of the Catalan Government to Madrid
- In office 9 June 2021 – 14 June 2023
- President: Pere Aragonès
- Preceded by: Gorka Knörr
- Succeeded by: Joan Capdevila i Esteve

Minister of Justice of Catalonia
- In office 2 June 2018 – 26 May 2021
- President: Quim Torra
- Preceded by: Carles Mundó i Blanch (Direct rule from 27 October 2017)
- Succeeded by: Lourdes Ciuró

Member of the Congress of Deputies
- In office 8 January 2016 – 1 June 2018
- Constituency: Barcelona

Member of the Senate
- In office 23 January 2013 – 12 January 2016
- Preceded by: Iolanda Pineda Balló
- Constituency: Catalonia

Member of the Municipality Council of Barcelona
- In office 2007–2011

Personal details
- Born: Ester Capella i Farré; 3 April 1963 (age 63) La Seu d'Urgell, Catalonia, Spain
- Citizenship: Spanish
- Party: Republican Left of Catalonia
- Other political affiliations: Republican Left of Catalonia–Catalonia Yes
- Education: University of Barcelona
- Occupation: Lawyer

Ester Capella i Farré (born 3 April 1963) is a Spanish lawyer and politician from Catalonia. She was the Minister of Justice of Catalonia in the Torra Cabinet, a member of the Congress of Deputies of Spain and Senate of Spain.

Born in 1968 in La Seu d'Urgell, Spain, Capella studied law at the University of Barcelona before becoming a lawyer. She was a municipal councillor in Barcelona from 2007 and 2011 and was appointed to the Senate of Spain in January 2013, serving until January 2016 when she became a member of the Congress of Deputies. She was appointed Minister of Justice of Catalonia in June 2018.

== Early life ==
Capella was born on 3 April 1963 in La Seu d'Urgell, Catalonia. She grew up in La Pobla de Segur. She has a degree in law from the University of Barcelona.

== Career ==
Capella started practising law in 1988. She is a member of the Bar Association of Barcelona. She was president of the Catalan Association of Democratic Lawyers (ACJD) from 2003 to 2007. She is a member of several feminist organisations including Women and Rights, the Women's Lobby of Catalonia and the Association of Women Jurists.

Capella contested the 2007 local elections as an independent Republican Left of Catalonia-Acord Municipal (ERC-AM) electoral alliance candidate in Barcelona and was elected. She joined ERC in 2008 and became the party's spokesperson on the city council. At the 2011 local elections Capella was placed third on the Unity for Barcelona–Republican Left of Catalonia–Reagrupament-Catalan Democracy-Acord Municipal (UpB-ERC-Ri.Cat-DCat-AM) alliance's list of candidates in Barcelona but the alliance only managed to win two seats in the municipality and as a result she failed to get re-elected. She was in charge of the Municipal Institute for People with Disabilities from 2011 to 2013.

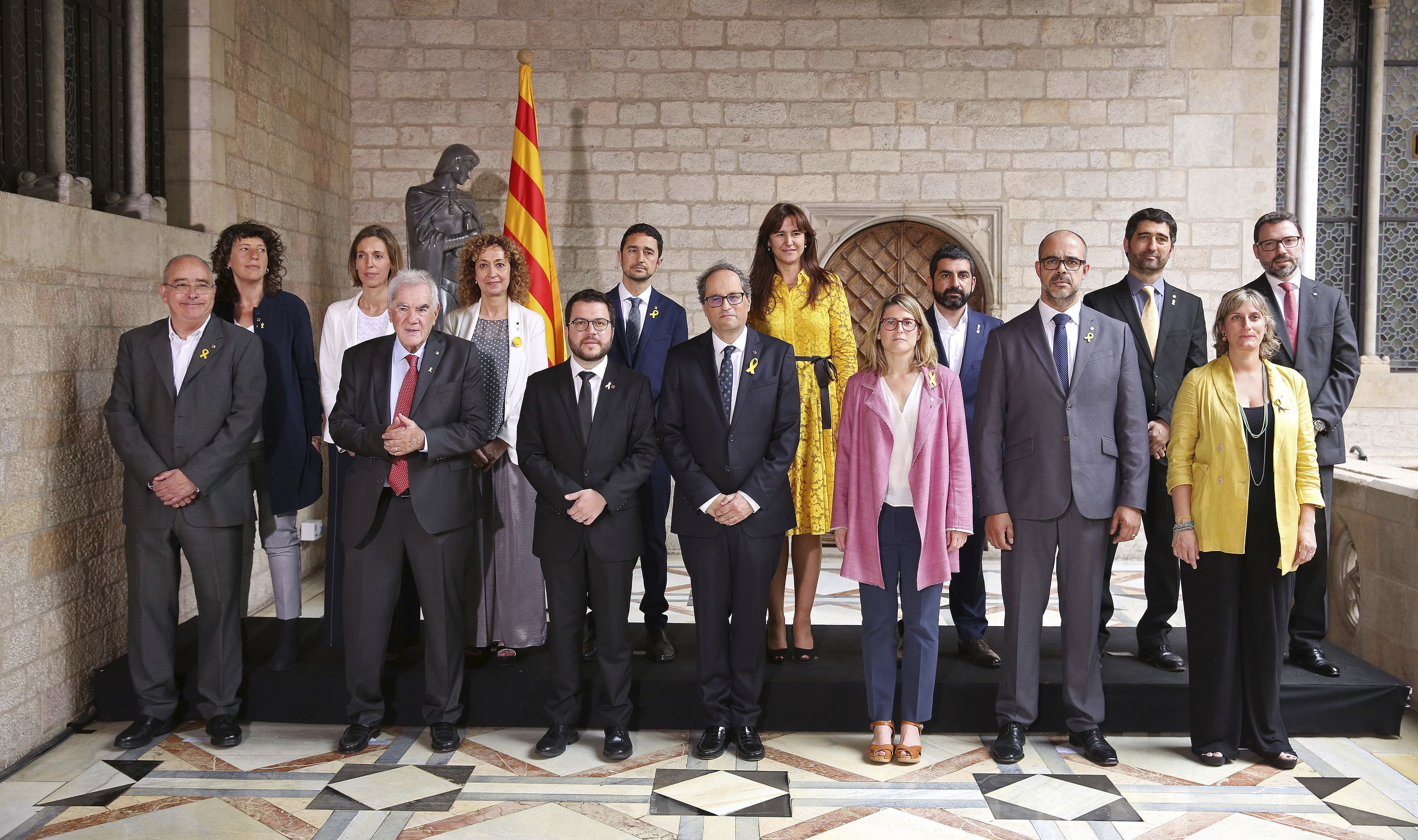
Capella and other members of the Catalan government on 2 June 2018

In January 2013 Capella was appointed to the Senate of Spain by the Parliament of Catalonia, replacing Socialist Iolanda Pineda Balló. At the 2015 local elections Capella was placed 11th on the ERC-AM alliance's list of candidates in La Pobla de Segur but the alliance only managed to win six seats in the municipality and as a result she failed to get elected. She contested the 2015 general election as a Republican Left of Catalonia–Catalonia Yes (ERC–CatSí) candidate in the Province of Barcelona and was elected to the Congress of Deputies. She was re-elected at the 2016 general election.

On 19 May 2018 newly elected President Quim Torra nominated a new government in which Capella was to be Minister of Justice. She was sworn in on 2 June 2018 at the Palau de la Generalitat de Catalunya.

== Electoral history ==
Electoral history of Ester Capella
Election	Constituency	Party	Alliance	No.	Result
2007 local	Barcelona	Independent	Republican Left of Catalonia-Acord Municipal	2	Elected
2011 local	Barcelona	Republican Left of Catalonia	UpB-ERC-Ri.Cat-DCat-AM	3	Not elected
2015 local	La Pobla de Segur	Republican Left of Catalonia	Republican Left of Catalonia-Acord Municipal	11	Not elected
2015 general	Province of Barcelona	Republican Left of Catalonia	Republican Left of Catalonia–Catalonia Yes	3	Elected
2016 general	Province of Barcelona	Republican Left of Catalonia	Republican Left of Catalonia–Catalonia Yes	3	Elected
