= Carles Mundó =

Spanish lawyer and politician

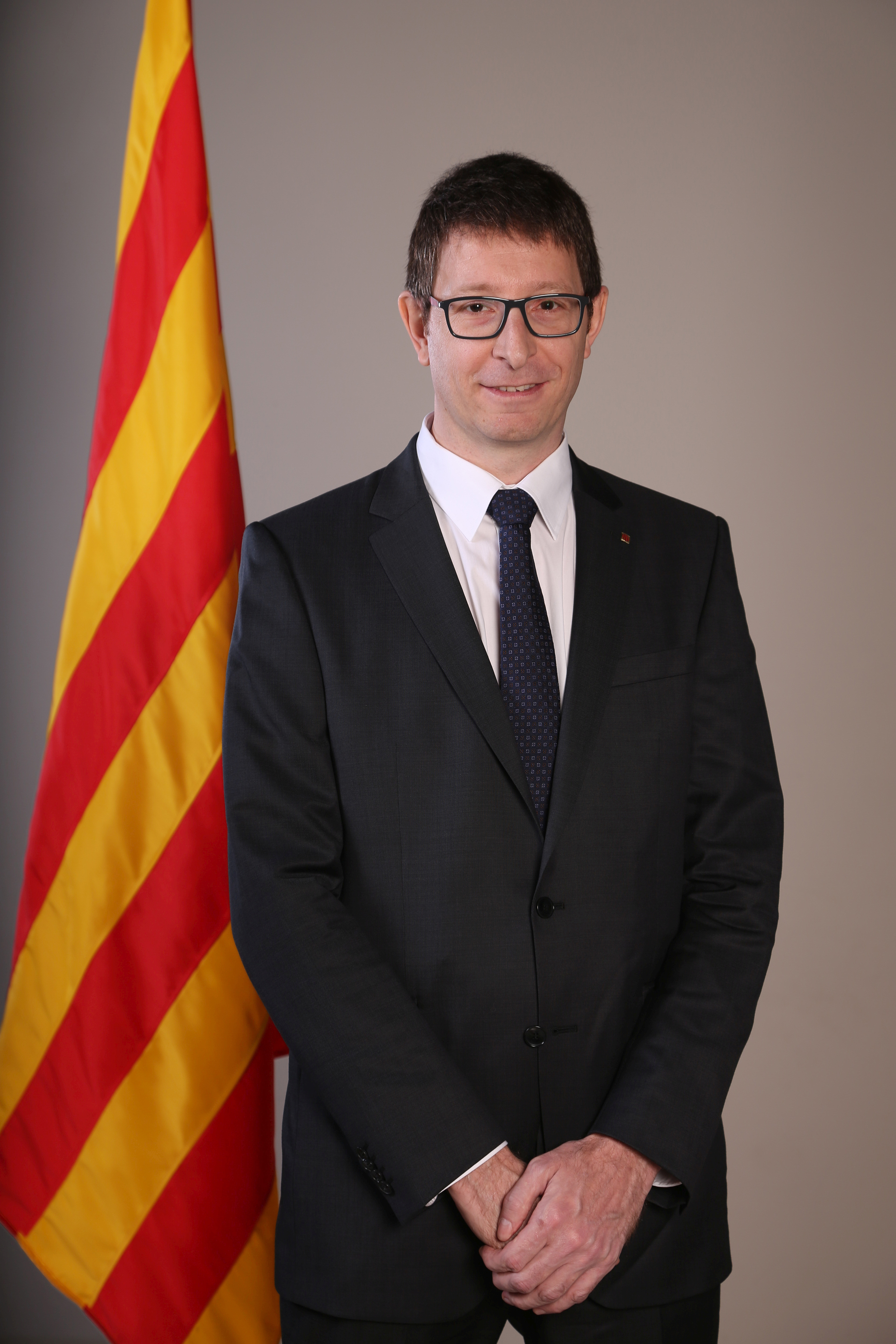

Minister of Justice of Catalonia
- In office 14 January 2016 – 27 October 2017
- President: Carles Puigdemont
- Preceded by: Germà Gordó i Aubarell
- Succeeded by: Ester Capella i Farré (Direct rule until 2 June 2018)

Personal details
- Born: Carles Mundó i Blanch; 1976 (age 49–50) Vic, Catalonia, Spain
- Party: Republican Left of Catalonia (1999-2017); Catalonia Yes (2017-present)
- Education: Pompeu Fabra University
- Occupation: Lawyer; Politician

Carles Mundó i Blanch (born 1976) is a Spanish lawyer and politician from Catalonia who served as the Minister of Justice of Catalonia until the dismissal of the Parliament of Catalonia and of the Catalan Government in 2017 due to its declaration of independence. He was reelected to the Catalan Parliament on 21 December 2017 as a member of the Catalonia Yes party until he resigned.

== Biography ==
Mundó was born in 1976 in Vic, Spain. He graduated from the Pompeu Fabra University in 1999 with a degree in law and a master's degree in Urban Law (IDEC-UPF). The same year, he was elected to the City Council of Gurb as a member of the ERC, retaining the position until 2015. In 2006, Mundó joined the Bar Association of Barcelona, and is currently responsible for the area of Civil Law of Bufet Vallbé of Barcelona. Between December 2003 and May 2006, Mundó served as the Head of the Cabinet of the Department of Education. He served as the Head of the Department of Culture and Media from December 2006 until January 2008, when he became the Secretary of Media of Communication from the Generalitat de Catalunya. He held this position until January 2011, during which time he supervised the switch of television broadcasts in Spain from analog to digital. He was also the president of the Catalan News Agency (ACN). He has been one of the promoters of the Rights Association, dedicated to denouncing the acts of anti-Catalanism.

On 14 January 2016 he was appointed regional Minister of Justice of the Generalitat by Carles Puigdemont. During his term, the Justice Department closed the Barcelona Model prison, the Civil Code of Catalonia was completed, sixty-six thousand victims of Francoist Spain had their judgements annulled, and the Law of Digital Will was approved.

== Spanish constitutional crisis, imprisonment and judicial case ==
On 27 October 2017, after the Parliament of Catalonia declared Catalonia's independence, the Senate of Spain dismissed the Catalan Parliament, including Carles Mundó. On 2 November 2017, eight members of the Catalan Government, including Carles Mundó, were tried before the Audiencia Nacional for rebelling against the Spanish government. The eight members were subsequently imprisoned from 2 November until 4 December, when he and the other seven members of the Catalan Government were released on bail after their case reached the Supreme Court of Spain.

In the 2017 Catalan Parliament elections, he was elected as a member of the Catalonia Yes party, although he resigned from the position of deputy for "personal reasons".

The trial began on 12 February 2019 and ended and was remitted to decision on 12 June 2019.

On 14 October 2019, Mundó was sentenced to a year and 8 months of disqualification and a fine of 60.000€ for disobedience.
