= Ramon Espadaler =

Spanish politician (born 1963)

The Honourable Ramon Espadaler MP
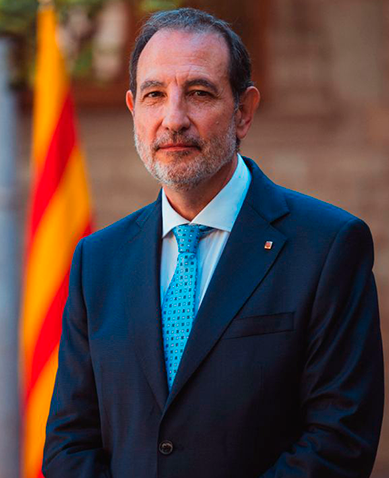
- Official portrait, 2024

Minister of Justice and Democratic Quality of Catalonia
- Incumbent
- Assumed office 12 August 2024
- President: Salvador Illa
- Preceded by: Gemma Ubasart

Minister of Home Affairs of Catalonia
- In office 27 December 2012 – 22 June 2015
- President: Artur Mas
- Preceded by: Felip Puig
- Succeeded by: Jordi Jané

Minister of the Environment and Housing of Catalonia
- In office 20 November 2001 – 20 December 2003
- President: Jordi Pujol
- Preceded by: Felip Puig
- Succeeded by: Salvador Milà

Member of the Parliament of Catalonia
- Incumbent
- Assumed office 17 January 2018
- Constituency: Barcelona
- In office 5 December 2003 – 16 April 2013
- Constituency: Barcelona
- In office 3 April 1992 – 25 January 2000
- Constituency: Barcelona

Personal details
- Born: Ramon Espadaler Parcerisas; 2 September 1963 (age 63) Vic, Catalonia, Spain
- Citizenship: Spanish
- Party: United to Advance (since 2017)
- Other political affiliations: UDC (1989–2017)
- Education: Autonomous University of Barcelona

Ramon Espadaler Parcerisas (born 19 September 1963 in Vic, Catalonia, Spain) is a Spanish politician.

== Early life and education ==
He gained a BA in geography and history from the University of Barcelona. He also studied political science and sociology at the Autonomous University of Barcelona.

== Political career ==
Espadaler has been a member of the Catalan Parliament from 1992 to the present, except for a period between January 2000 and 2003. During that time, he held two government posts. He was first appointed director general for local government at the Ministry for Governmental Affairs and Institutional Relations. The following year he became minister for the environment, a post he held until 2003.

From 2010 to 2012, he was deputy spokesman for the CiU, Catalonia's current ruling coalition, at Catalonia's Parliament. The CiU was then the main opposition group. He sponsored bills 7/2011 (on financial and tax measures), 9/2011 (on the promotion of business activities), and 5/2012 (on financial, tax, and administrative measures, and setting up of a tax on hotel stays). He had previously served as deputy mayor of Vic (1999–2001), and as deputy mayor of Sant Quirze de Besora, a smaller nearby town (1991–1999).

Espadaler has been a Catalan representative at the Congress of Local and Regional Authorities of the Council of Europe. He has authored a number of history papers, together with articles in the local and national press.

A member of the Democratic Union of Catalonia (UDC) since 1988, Espadaler chairs its national council since 2003. The UDC is a Christian-Democrat party founded in 1931, and the CiU's junior partner. Past party posts include president of the Barcelona Province chapter, secretary for local government affairs at the ruling council, and secretary general of the ruling council in 2001–2002.

== Personal life ==
Son of the last Francoist mayor of Sant Quirze de Besora, he is married, a practicing Catholic and has three children.

Despite his party being in coalition with the PSC, he is openly anti-abortion, against same sex marriage and transgender rights (Ley Trans), being allowed to break parliamentary whip for conscience votes. In 2018, while being a PSC member, he abstained from voting on the withdrawal of funding for sex-segregated schools in Catalonia. He is in favor of a "Catalan nation" integrated in a "Plurinational Spain".
