= Gringo: The Dangerous Life of John McAfee =

2016 film

- Promotional poster
- Directed by: Nanette Burstein
- Starring: John McAfee
- Music by: Dana Kaproff
- Country of origin: United States
- Original language: English

Production
- Producer: Jeff Wise Chi-Young Park
- Cinematography: Robert Chappell
- Editors: Lars Woodruffe; Matt Colbourn; Kenneth Levis
- Running time: 97 minutes
- Production company: Ish Entertainment

Original release
- Network: Showtime
- Release: September 24, 2016

Gringo: The Dangerous Life of John McAfee is a 2016 American documentary film, about the portion of John McAfee's life spent in Belize. The film was directed by Nanette Burstein and produced by Ish Entertainment. The film had its world premiere at the Toronto International Film Festival on September 11, 2016, before airing on Showtime on September 24, 2016.

== Synopsis ==
McAfee became a multi-millionaire after creating a prominent antivirus software, and later relocated to Belize. In April 2012, national police raided McAfee's estate based on suspicions of drug manufacture or trafficking. Later that year, McAfee's neighbor Greg Faull was murdered and McAfee went into hiding before crossing the border to Guatemala and being deported back to the United States.

Based on interviews with McAfee's former friends and employees in Belize, the documentary suggests that McAfee paid a hitman to kill Faull due to a feud between the two over McAfee's dogs. It further claims that McAfee had suspected David Middleton to have robbed his home and paid people to abduct and abuse him; Middleton died soon after from his injuries. The film also contains an interview with Allison Adonizio, a biologist who worked with McAfee. She said that she believes to have been drugged and sexually abused by McAfee.

== Reception ==
John DeFore of The Hollywood Reporter praised the film, stating, "Though she says she began the documentary trying to understand how McAfee's likely guilt was so quickly forgotten by the media as they covered his latest political aspirations, Burstein seems to have wound up conducting an investigation more thorough, or at least more fruitful, than any local authority." Jacob Brogan of Slate said of the film, "Even when Burstein's questions don't prompt easy answers, it's thrilling to consider the possibilities that arise in their wake", while Steve Greene of IndieWire said, "This film works best as an indictment of a sensationalist, tunnel-vision brand of media coverage that confuses eccentricity for legitimacy and eschews reporting in favor of the face-value testimony of a strong personality."

== Criticism ==
Belize's leading newspaper published an article stating the producer paid money to purposely sensationalize the documentary, made interviewees sign papers that they did not or could not properly read and comprehend, or said it was only to be watched by John McAfee.

McAfee described the documentary as fiction. Several people interviewed in the film retracted their statements in video messages uploaded to McAfee's YouTube channel. They said that they felt misled by the director's questioning and filed a cease and desist demand on grounds of untrue allegations.
