= Public Prosecutor (Autonomous Communities of Spain) =

The Office of the Public Prosecutor was created in the Autonomous communities of Spain by Royal Decree 1754/2007 of December 28 (BOE of December 31, 2007).

== Autonomous communities ==
=== Andalusia ===
The Office of the Public Prosecutor of Andalusia is more direct than the Prosecutor of the Superior Court of Justice of Andalusia, Ceuta and Melilla, which was guided by the chief prosecutor of the community. Andalusia includes the provinces of Almería, Cádiz, Córdoba, Granada, Huelva, Jaén, Málaga and Seville.

==== Senior prosecutor (Andalusia) ====
The Office of the Public Prosecutor of Andalusia is headed by the Superior Public Prosecutor of Andalusia, Ceuta and Melilla, who assumes the representation and leadership of the Public Prosecutor's Office throughout the territory of the autonomous community—without prejudice to the powers that correspond to the Attorney General of the State.

Name	Term
Jesús García Calderón	2001-2017
Ana Tárrago Ruiz	2017–present

===== Cádiz Province (Ceuta) =====
In the Cádiz Province, the Area Prosecutor's Office of Cádiz covers the judicial party of Ceuta. The Chief Prosecutor is subordinate to the Chief Prosecutor of the Provincial Prosecutor's Office of Cádiz.

====== Chief Prosecutor (Ceuta) ======
Name	Term
José Luis Puerta Martí	2010–present

===== Málaga Province (Melilla) =====
In the Málaga Province, the Area Prosecutor's Office of Melilla covers the judicial party of Melilla. The Chief Prosecutor is subordinate to the Chief Prosecutor of the Provincial Prosecutor's Office of Málaga.

====== Chief Prosecutor (Melilla) ======
Name	Term
María Rodríguez García	2010-2015
Isabel Martín López	2015–present

=== Aragón ===
The Office of the Public Prosecutor of Aragón (also referred to as the Superior Public Prosecutor of Aragón) is the judicial body that represents the Public Prosecutor's Office in the autonomous community of Aragón (Spain). It is the highest body of the Public Prosecutor's Office in the community with its headquarters in the city of Zaragoza. Aragon includes the provinces of Huesca, Teruel and Zaragoza.

==== Senior prosecutor (Aragón) ====
The Office of the Public Prosecutor of Aragón is headed by the Superior Public Prosecutor of Aragón, who assumes the representation and leadership of the Public Prosecutor's Office throughout the territory of the autonomous community—without prejudice to the powers that correspond to the Attorney General of the State.

Name	Term
José María Rivera	2008–present

=== Asturias ===
The Office of the Public Prosecutor of Asturias (also referred to as the Superior Public Prosecutor of Asturias) is the judicial body that represents the Public Prosecutor's Office in the autonomous community of Asturias (Spain). It is the highest body of the Public Prosecutor's Office in the community with its headquarters in the city of Oviedo.

==== Senior prosecutor (Asturias) ====
The Office of the Public Prosecutor of Asturias is headed by the Superior Public Prosecutor of Asturias, who assumes the representation and leadership of the Public Prosecutor's Office throughout the territory of the autonomous community—without prejudice to the powers that correspond to the Attorney General of the State.

Name	Term
Gerardo Herrero	2013-2013
María Esther Fernández	2013–present

=== Balearic Islands (Illes Balears) ===
The Office of the Public Prosecutor of Illes Balears (also referred to as the Superior Prosecutor's Office of Illes Balears) is the judicial body that represents the Public Prosecutor's Office in the autonomous community of Illes Balears (Spain). It is the highest body of the Public Prosecutor's Office in the community that is based in Palma de Mallorca.

==== Senior prosecutor (Balearic Islands) ====
The Prosecutor's Office of Illes Balears is headed by the superior prosecutor of Illes Balears who assumes the representation and leadership of the Prosecutor's Office throughout the territory of the autonomous community—without prejudice to the powers that correspond to the State's Attorney General.

Name	Term
Bartolomé Barceló Oliver	2002–present

=== Basque Country ===
The Office of the Public Prosecutor of the Basque Country (also referred to as the Superior Public Prosecutor of Basque Country) is the judicial body that represents the Public Prosecutor's Office in the autonomous community of the Basque Country (Spain). It is the highest body of the Public Prosecutor's Office in the community with its headquarters in the city of Bilbao. Basque Country includes the provinces of Álava, Biscay, and Gipuzkoa.

==== Senior prosecutor (Basque Country) ====
The Office of the Public Prosecutor of the Basque Country is headed by the Superior Public Prosecutor of the Basque Country, who assumes the representation and leadership of the Public Prosecutor's Office throughout the territory of the autonomous community—without prejudice to the powers that correspond to the Attorney General of the State.

Name	Term
María Ángeles Montes	2008-2010
Juan Calparsoro	2010-2017
Carmen Adán del Río	2017–present

=== Canary Islands ===
The Office of the Public Prosecutor of the Canary Islands (also referred to as the Superior Public Prosecutor of the Canary Islands) is the judicial body that represents the Public Prosecutor's Office in the autonomous community of the Canary Islands (Spain). It is the highest body of the Public Prosecutor's Office in the community with its headquarters in the city of Las Palmas. Canary Islands includes the provinces of Las Palmas and Santa Cruz de Tenerife.

==== Senior prosecutor (Canary Islands) ====
The Office of the Public Prosecutor of the Canary Islands is headed by the Superior Public Prosecutor of the Canary Islands, who assumes the representation and leadership of the Public Prosecutor's Office throughout the territory of the autonomous community—without prejudice to the powers that correspond to the Attorney General of the State.

Name	Term
Vicente Garrido García	2008–present

=== Cantabria ===
The Office of the Public Prosecutor of Cantabria (also referred to as the Superior Public Prosecutor of Cantabria) is the judicial body that represents the Public Prosecutor's Office in the autonomous community of Cantabria (Spain). It is the highest body of the Public Prosecutor's Office in the community with its headquarters in the city of Santander.

==== Senior prosecutor (Cantabria) ====
The Office of the Public Prosecutor of Cantabria is headed by the Superior Public Prosecutor of Cantabria, who assumes the representation and leadership of the Public Prosecutor's Office throughout the territory of the autonomous community—without prejudice to the powers that correspond to the Attorney General of the State.

Name	Term
José Ignacio Tejido	2008-2015
Pilar Jiménez	2015–present

=== Castile and León (Castilla y León) ===
The Office of the Prosecutor of Castile and León (also referred to as the Superior Prosecutor's Office of Castile and León) is the judicial body that represents the Public Prosecutor's Office in the autonomous community of Castile and León (Spain). It is the highest body of the Public Prosecutor's Office in the community, and is based in Burgos. Castille and León includes tth provinces of Ávila, Burgos, León, Palencia, Salamanca, Segovia, Soria, Valladolid and Zamora.

==== Senior prosecutor (Castile and León) ====
The Office of the Prosecutor of Castile and León is headed by the superior prosecutor of Castile and León, who assumes the representation and leadership of the Public Prosecutor's Office throughout the territory of the autonomous community, without prejudice to the powers that correspond to the State's Attorney General.

Name	Term
Manuel Martín-Granizo	2008-2015
Lourdes Rodríguez Rey	2015–present

=== Castilla-La Mancha ===
The Office of the Public Prosecutor of Castilla-La Mancha (also referred to as the Superior Public Prosecutor of Castilla-La Mancha) is the judicial body that represents the Public Prosecutor's Office in the autonomous community of Castilla-La Mancha (Spain). It is the highest body of the Public Prosecutor's Office in the community with its headquarters in the city of Albacete. Castilla-La Mancha includes the provinces of Albacete, Ciudad Real, Cuenca, Guadalajara and Toledo.

==== Senior prosecutor (Castilla-La Mancha) ====
The Prosecutor's Office of Castilla-La Mancha is headed by the superior prosecutor of Castilla-La Mancha who assumes the representation and leadership of the Public Prosecutor throughout the territory of the autonomous community—without prejudice to the powers that correspond to the Attorney General of the State.

Name	Term
Andrés López Mora	1989-2006
José Martínez Jiménez	2006–present

=== Community of Madrid ===
The Office of the Public Prosecutor of the Community of Madrid (also referred to as the Office of the High Prosecutor of Madrid) is the judicial body that represents the Public Prosecutor in the Community of Madrid (Spain). It is the highest autonomous body of the Fiscal Ministry in the region that is based in Madrid.

==== Senior prosecutor (Community of Madrid) ====
The Office of the Public Prosecutor of the Community of Madrid is headed by the superior public prosecutor of the Community of Madrid who assumes the representation and leadership of the Public Prosecutor's Office throughout the territory of the autonomous community—without prejudice to the powers that correspond to the Attorney General of the State.

Name	Term
Manuel Moix	2003-2015
Jesús Caballero Klink	2015–present

=== Extremadura ===
The Office of the Public Prosecutor of Extremadura (also referred to as the Superior Prosecutor's Office of Extremadura) is the judicial body that represents the Public Prosecutor's Office in the autonomous community of Extremadura (Spain). It is the highest body of the Public Prosecutor's Office in the community that is based in Cáceres. Extremadura includes the provinces of Badajoz and Cáceres.

==== Senior prosecutor (Extremadura) ====
The Office of the Public Prosecutor of the Extremadura is headed by the superior public prosecutor of the Extremadura who assumes the representation and leadership of the Public Prosecutor's Office throughout the territory of the autonomous community—without prejudice to the powers that correspond to the Attorney General of the State.

Name	Term
Aurelio Blanco Peñalver	2005–present

=== Galicia ===
The Office of the Public Prosecutor of Galicia (also referred to as the Superior Prosecutor's Office of Galicia) is the judicial body that represents the Public Prosecutor's Office in the autonomous community of Galicia (Spain). It is the highest body of the Public Prosecutor's Office in the community that is based in La Coruña. Galicia includes the provinces of A Coruña, Lugo, Ourense and Pontevedra.

==== Senior prosecutor (Galicia) ====
The Prosecutor's Office of Galicia is headed by the superior prosecutor of Galicia who assumes the representation and leadership of the Prosecutor's Office throughout the territory of the autonomous community—without prejudice to the powers that correspond to the State's Attorney General.

Name	Term
Carlos Varela	2008-2015
Fernando Suanzes Pérez	2015–present

=== La Rioja ===
The Office of the Public Prosecutor of La Rioja (also referred to as the Superior Prosecutor's Office of La Rioja) is the judicial body that represents the Public Prosecutor's Office in the autonomous community of La Rioja (Spain). It is the highest body of the Public Prosecutor's Office in the community that is based in Logroño.

==== Senior prosecutor (La Rioja) ====
The Prosecutor's Office of La Rioja is headed by the superior prosecutor of La Rioja who assumes the representation and leadership of the Prosecutor's Office throughout the territory of the autonomous community—without prejudice to the powers that correspond to the State's Attorney General.

Name	Term
Juan Calparsoro	2004-2010
Enrique Pedro Stern Briones	2011–present

=== Murcia ===
The Office of the Public Prosecutor of Murcia (also referred to as the Superior Public Prosecutor of Murcia) is the judicial body that represents the Public Prosecutor's Office in the autonomous community of Murcia (Spain). It is the highest body of the Public Prosecutor's Office in the community with its headquarters in the city of Murcia.

==== Senior prosecutor (Murcia) ====
The Office of the Public Prosecutor of Murcia is headed by the Superior Public Prosecutor of Murcia, who assumes the representation and leadership of the Public Prosecutor's Office throughout the territory of the autonomous community—without prejudice to the powers that correspond to the Attorney General of the State.

Name	Term
Manuel López Bernal	2007-2017
José Luís Díaz Manzanera	2017–present

=== Navarre ===
The Office of the Prosecutor of Navarre (also referred to as the Office of the High Prosecutor of Navarre) is the judicial body that represents the Public Prosecutor in the Navarre (Spain). It is the highest body of the Public Prosecutor's Office in the autonomous community that is based in Pamplona.

==== Senior prosecutor (Navarre) ====
The Office of the Prosecutor of Navarre is directed by the superior prosecutor of the Navarre who assumes the representation and leadership of the Public Prosecutor's Office throughout the territory of the autonomous community—without prejudice to the powers that correspond to the State Attorney General.

Name	Term
Javier Muñoz Cuesta	2003-2012
José Antonio Sánchez Sánchez-Villares	2012–present

=== Valencian Community ===
The Office of the Prosecutor of the Valencian Community (also referred to as the Office of the High Prosecutor of the Valencian Community) is the judicial body that represents the Public Prosecutor in the Valencian Community (Spain). It is the highest body of the Public Prosecutor's Office in the autonomous community that is based in Valencia. Valencian Community includes the provinces of Alicante, Castellón and Valencia.

==== Senior prosecutor (Valencian Community) ====
The Office of the Prosecutor of the Valencian Community is directed by the superior prosecutor of the Valencian Community who assumes the representation and leadership of the Public Prosecutor's Office throughout the territory of the autonomous community—without prejudice to the powers that correspond to the State Attorney General.

Name	Term
Ricard Cabedo	2005-2013
Antonio Montabes Córdoba	2013–present

== See also ==
- Fiscalía de Andalucía (Prosecutor of Andalusia)
- Fiscalía del País Vasco (Prosecutor of the Basque Country)
- Fiscalía de Castilla y León (Prosecutor of Castilla y León)
- Fiscalía de Castilla-La Mancha (Prosecutor of Castilla-La Mancha)
- Fiscalía de la Comunidad de Madrid (Prosecutor of the Community of Madrid)
- Fiscalía de Galicia (Prosecutor's Office of Galicia)
- Fiscalía de la Comunidad Valenciana (Prosecutor of the Valenciana Community)
- Justice ministry
- List of ministers of justice of Catalonia
- Ministry of Justice (Spain)
- Political divisions of Spain
- Spanish Attorney General
