= Lourdes Ciuró =

Spanish lawyer and politician

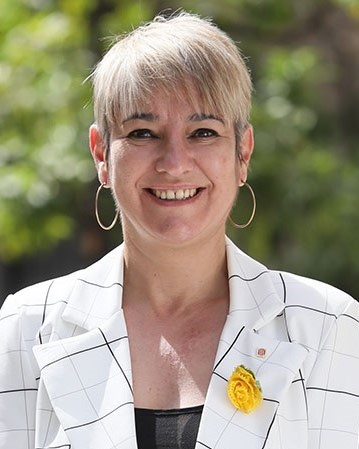
- Official portrait, 2021

Minister of Justice of Catalonia
- In office 26 May 2021 – 7 October 2022
- President: Pere Aragonès
- Preceded by: Ester Capella
- Succeeded by: Gemma Ubasart

Member of the Congress of Deputies of Spain
- In office 1 December 2011 – 5 March 2019
- Constituency: Barcelona

Member of Sabadell Municipal Council
- In office 2007–2011
- Succeeded by: Jordi Font i Renom

Personal details
- Born: Maria Lourdes Ciuró i Buldó; 3 June 1971 (age 55) Reus, Catalonia, Spain
- Citizenship: Spanish
- Party: Catalan European Democratic Party
- Other political affiliations: Together for Catalonia
- Education: Autonomous University of Barcelona
- Occupation: Lawyer

Maria Lourdes Ciuró i Buldó (born 3 June 1971) is a Catalan lawyer, politician, and a former member of the Congress of Deputies of Spain.

== Early life ==
Ciuró was born in Reus, Catalonia. She graduated in law from the Autonomous University of Barcelona. Ciuró joined the Democratic Convergence of Catalonia (CDC) in 2003 and was a member of its national council.

== Career ==
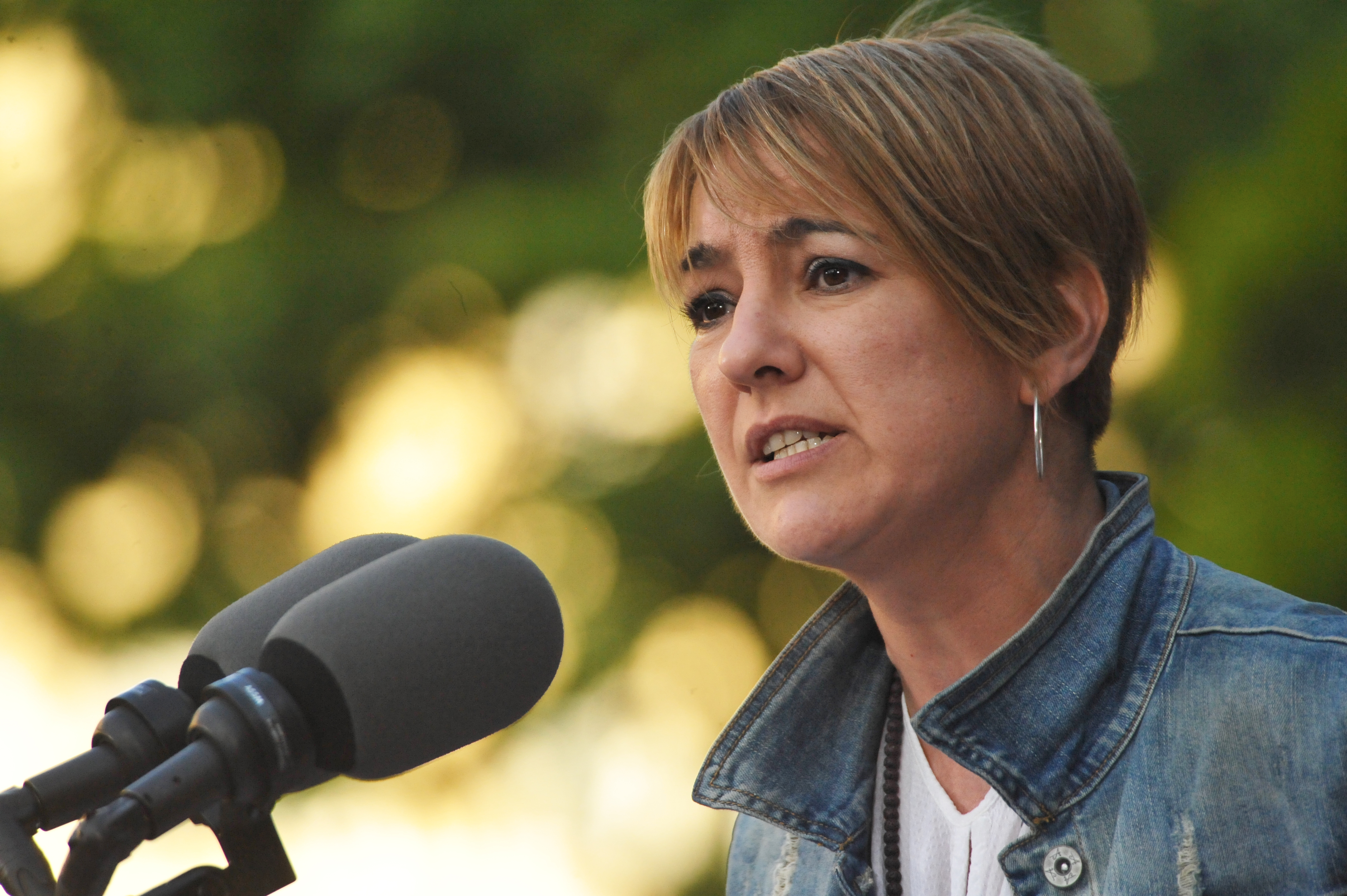
Ciuró addresses the CDC's "Acte a Sabadell" event on 18 June 2016

Ciuró practised from 1994 to 2011, specialising in real estate and family law. She is a member of the bar associations of Barcelona and Sabadell.

Ciuró contested the 2007 local elections as a Convergence and Union (CiU) electoral alliance candidate in Sabadell and was elected. She was re-elected in the 2011 local election. She contested the 2011 general election as a CiU candidate in the Province of Barcelona and was elected to the Congress of Deputies. She was re-elected in the 2015 and 2016 general elections.

In the 2017 regional election, Ciuró placed 57th on the Together for Catalonia alliance's list of candidates in the Province of Barcelona but, the alliance only managed to win 17 seats and as a result she did not get elected. In July 2018, she was elected to the PDeCAT's executive directorate.

In February 2018, Ciuró won the nomination to be the Catalan European Democratic Party (PDeCAT)'s mayoral candidate in Sabadell in the 2019 local elections. She contested the 2019 local elections as a Together for Catalonia candidate in Sabadell and was re-elected, though she did not become mayor.

In May 2024, Ciuró, a candidate for the Catalan Parliament with Together for Catalonia, emphasized her party's commitment to Catalan interests, advocating for a new fiscal pact with Madrid and calling for the return of former President Carles Puigdemont. She positioned her party as the only party capable of forming a strong, independent Catalan government free from external influence.

== Personal life ==
Ciuró is married with two children.

== Electoral history ==
Electoral history of Lourdes Ciuró
Election	Constituency	Party	Alliance	No.	Result
2007 local	Sabadell	Democratic Convergence of Catalonia	Convergence and Union	4	Elected
2011 local	Sabadell	Democratic Convergence of Catalonia	Convergence and Union	4	Elected
2011 general	Province of Barcelona	Democratic Convergence of Catalonia	Convergence and Union	8	Elected
2015 general	Province of Barcelona	Democratic Convergence of Catalonia	Democracy and Freedom	3	Elected
2016 general	Province of Barcelona	Democratic Convergence of Catalonia		3	Elected
2017 regional	Province of Barcelona	Catalan European Democratic Party	Together for Catalonia	57	Not elected
2019 local	Sabadell	Catalan European Democratic Party	Together for Catalonia	1	Elected
