= Running with the Devil: The Wild World of John McAfee =

2022 documentary film

- Directed by: Charlie Russell
- Starring: John McAfee; Rocco Castoro; Alex Cody Foster; Robert King
- Production company: Curious Films
- Distributed by: Netflix
- Release date: August 24, 2022
- Running time: 105 minutes

Running with the Devil: The Wild World of John McAfee is a 2022 documentary film about John McAfee.
