= Ministry of Justice (Spain) =

Former government ministry of Spain

- Ministerio de Justicia

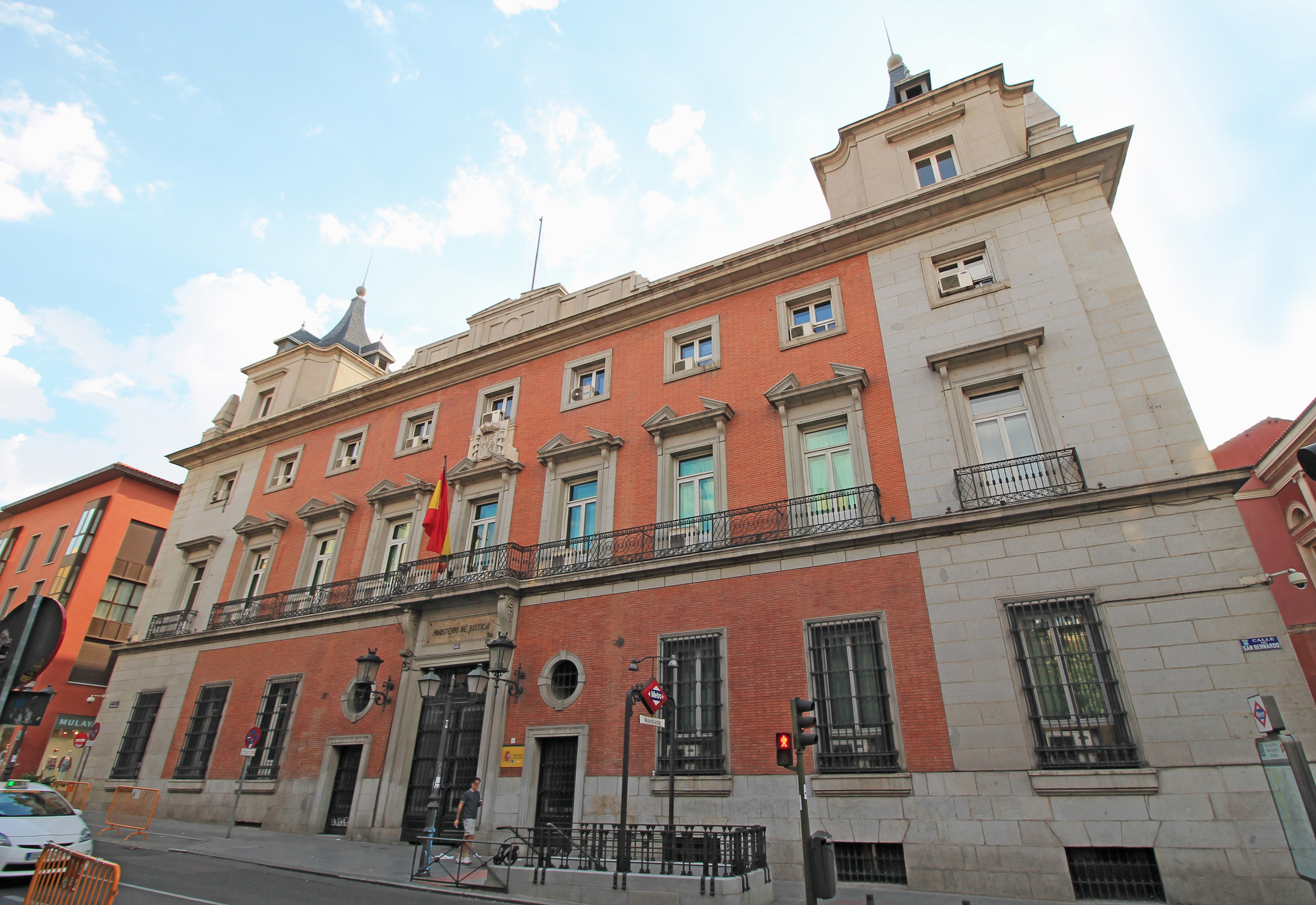
- Headquarters of the Ministry

Agency overview
- Formed: 30 November 1714; 311 years ago (as Secretary of State and of the Dispatch of Ecclesiastical Issues, Justice and Jurisdiction)
- Preceding agency: Ministry of Justice and Interior
- Dissolved: 20 November 2023
- Superseding agency: Ministry of the Presidency, Justice and Relations with the Cortes
- Type: Ministry
- Jurisdiction: Government of Spain
- Headquarters: Palacio de la Marquesa de la Sonora (Madrid)
- Annual budget: € 2.5 billion, 2023
- Website: Ministry of Justice(in Spanish)

The Ministry of Justice (MJUS) was the department of the Government of Spain responsible for preparing and carrying out the government policy in order to bring the legal system off, specially in criminal, civil, commercial and procedural law affairs, supporting the Administration of Justice and the legal and international cooperation.

Likewise, it was responsible for processing the documents relative to grace right, titles of nobility and Grandees which resolution is given by the King and is carried out by the Council of Ministers, giving legal attendance to the State administrations and it is the communication channel of the Government with the Administration of Justice, with the General Council of the Judiciary and with the Prosecution Ministry, through the Prosecutor General, as well as with the governing bodies of the autonomous communities with judicial responsibilities, the Spanish Data Protection Agency and the associations of legal experts.

The MJUS was headed by the Minister of Justice, who is appointed by the King of Spain at request of the Prime Minister, after hearing the Council of Ministers. The Minister is assisted by three main officials, the Secretary of State for Justice, the Under Secretary of Justice and the Secretary-General for Innovation and Quality of the Public Justice Service. The Solicitor General depends from the Minister.

The ministry had its headquarters in the Palace of the Marchioness of Sonora, Madrid.

== History ==
=== Origin ===
The administration of justice was a real prerogative and would continue being it until the 19th century, with the firsts constitutions. However, the monarchs already delegate its judicial powers on civil servants in charge of administering justice but the first time that a kind-of government department was created for judicial affairs was in 1705. That year, King Philip V split the Secretariat of the Universal Dispatch into two secretariats, one for War and Treasury and other «for everything else», which primarily included justice and religion affairs.

=== The beginnings ===
However, the true germ of the ministry is found in the Royal Decree of 30 November 1714, which, similar to the French model, divided matters by subject, creating four Secretariats of the Dispatch, among which was the Secretariat of State and of the Dispatch of Ecclesiastical Affairs, Justice and Jurisdiction, in charge of religious affairs, maintenance of royalties from the Crown, the regime of universities, and justice and jurisdiction of Councils and courts, especially in appointments. This secretariat was assumed by Manuel Vadillo Velasco who previously assumed the «Secretariat of the Dispatch for everything else».

This Secretariat of State and of the Dispatch of Ecclesiastical Affairs, Justice and Jurisdiction is renamed Secretariat of the Dispatch of Justice, Political Government and Treasury of Spain and the Indies on 2 April 1717, since it assumes the powers of the Treasury after the General Supervision had been eliminated and after being merged most of the Secretariats of the Dispatch, preserving just three of them. However, this situation will last a short time because in December 1720 the Treasury business regained autonomy, splitting from the Ministry of Justice.

=== Grace and Justice ===
The great reforms carried out by Ferdinand VI in 1754-1755 established the definitive classification of the Secretariats of the Dispatch and their powers. Thus, between 15 May 1754 and 14 May 1755, by a series of Royal Decrees, the Secretariats of the Dispatch become five (the Treasury one is re-created), and they are endowed with a permanent organization. In the case of the Secretariat of Ecclesiastical Affairs, Justice and Jurisdiction, by the Decree of 16 August 1754, its name was changed to the "Secretariat of State and of the Dispatch of Grace and Justice". The subsequent reform of the year 1787 gave rise to a further division of the Secretariats, as a solution to the accumulation of affairs and businesses from the Indies.

As for the functions of this Secretariat of the Dispatch of Grace and Justice, it corresponded to it the matters previously dealt with by the Chamber of Castile and the Royal Council, basically those relating to royal patronage, ecclesiastical jurisdiction, and the organization and operation of the Courts of Justice. Thus, it was attributed to this Secretariat everything to the appointments of archbishops, bishops, ecclesiastical dignities, perks, trades and chaplaincies; the government of courts and chancery, the appointment of its presidents, governors and ministers, and the resources of justice; the provision of the corregimientos not destined to war and property; the conservation of royalties of the Crown, as well as the dispatch of what is convenient to the royal houses and the provision of their jobs and the care of the observance of laws and pragmatics.

In 1787, the pre-existing Secretariat of the Navy and the Indies is divided into three, with the names of: Navy, Grace and Justice of the Indies, and War, Treasury, Commerce and Navigation of the Indies, bringing the judicial affairs of the Indies to this moment assumed by the Indies Secretariat to a new the Secretariat of Grace and Justice of the Indies. However, this reform did not end the problems it had tried to remedy, so by Royal Decree of 25 April 1790, the classic division into five Secretaries of State and of the Dispatch was re-established: «State», «War», «Navy», «Treasury» and «Grace and Justice», each of which assumed the corresponding matters to the Indies. This division of the different branches of the Administration will be maintained until the Cortes of Cádiz, which will introduce other reforms.

=== The Ministry ===
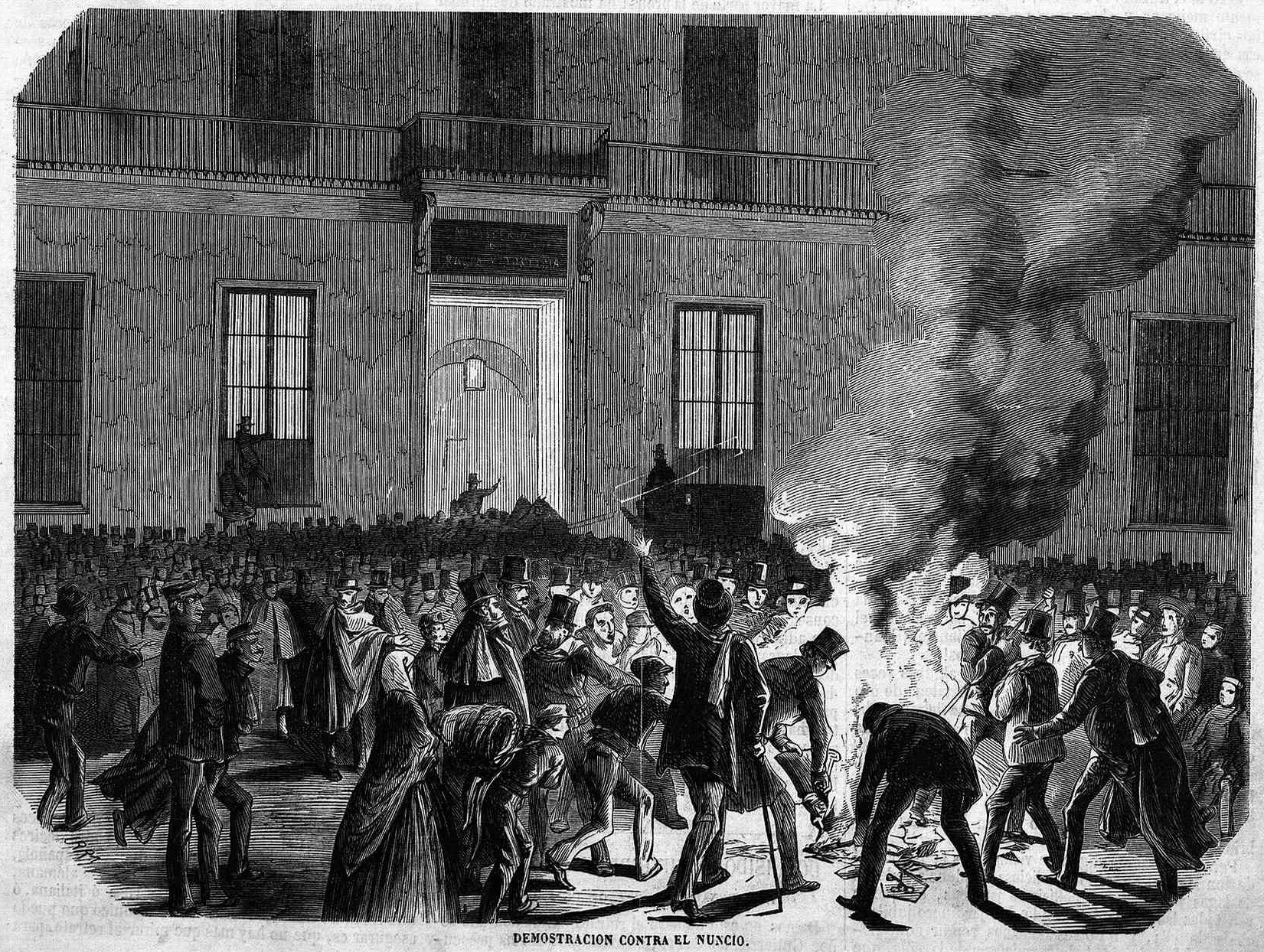
A demonstration for freedom of worship in front of the Ministry's headquarters. 1869.

In 1812, the name «Secretariat of the Dispatch of Grace and Justice» was changed to «Ministry of Grace and Justice». But in fact, already the Statute of Bayonne of 1808 and the Constitution of 1837 used the term «minister» to refer to the secretaries of the Dispatch, since both terms were used as synonyms until the Royal Decree of 20 September 1851 changed the name of the Secretariat of State and of the Dispatch of Public Works to Ministry of Development, making official the denomination of «ministries» for the former Secretariats of the Dispatch and, consequently, it is definitively called Ministry of Grace and Justice.

Since then, the Ministry of Justice has hardly changed (except for those of internal organization) and the most significant changes were in the Second Republic, specifically on 14 April 1931, when it was renamed «Ministry of Justice» and the period from 25 September 1935 to 19 February 1936, in which the name of the department was «Ministry of Labor, Health and Justice».

Already in democracy, the most significant change was between May 1994 and May 1996, when it merged with the Ministry of the Interior, giving rise to the Ministry of Justice and the Interior.

In 2020, the department lost the powers over the fundamental right of freedom of worship and the matters related with the Historical Memory Act.

In November 2023, the Ministry was disestablished and it was merged with the Ministry of the Presidency. It was the second time in three centuries that the Ministry of Justice was abolished after its merger with the Ministry of the Interior from 1994 to 1996.

== Organization chart ==
The Ministry of Justice was organised in the following managerial bodies:

- The Secretariat of State for Justice.
  - The General Secretariat for Innovation and Quality of the Public Justice Service.
    - The Directorate-General for the Public Justice Service.
    - The Directorate-General for the Digital Transformation of the Administration of Justice.
    - The Directorate-General for Legal Certainty and Public Attestation.
    - The Deputy Directorate-General for Innovation and Quality of the Fiscal and Judicial Office.
  - The Directorate-General for International Legal Cooperation and Human Rights.
- The Undersecretary of Justice.
  - The Technical General Secretariat.
  - The Budget Office.
  - The Deputy Directorate-General for Human Resources.
  - The Deputy Directorate-General for Hiring and Economic Management.
  - The Deputy Directorate-General for Building and Heritage.
  - The Deputy Directorate-General for Administrative Information and General Inspection of Services.
  - The Division for the Right of Grace and other Rights.
- The Office of the Solicitor General.
  - The Directorate-General for Advisory Services.
  - The Directorate-General for Litigation Services.
  - The Deputy Directorate-General for Human and Material Resources.
  - The Deputy Directorate-General for Constitutional Affairs and Human Rights.
  - The Deputy Directorate-General for European Union and International Affairs.
  - The Deputy Directorate-General for Internal Audit and Knowledge Management.
  - The Technical Cabinet of the Solicitor General.
  - The Offices of the Solicitor General at the Spanish regions and autonomous cities.

=== Agencies ===
- The Center for Legal Studies.
- The General Mutual Benefit Society for the Personnel of the Administration of Justice.

== First Notary of the Kingdom ==
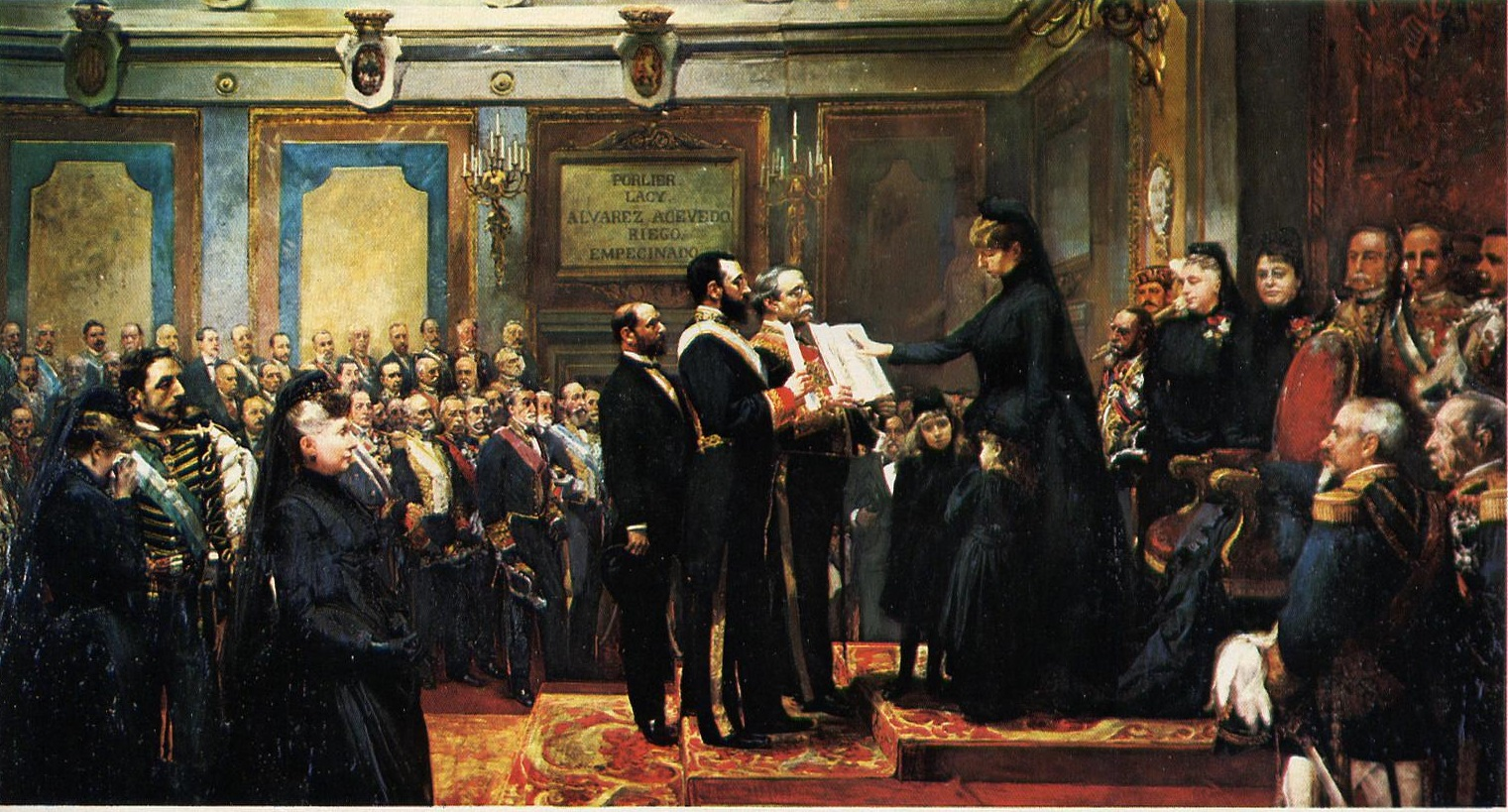
Queen Maria Cristina swearing in as regent before the First Notary of the Kingdom.

First Notary of the Kingdom or Chief Notary of the Kingdom, in Spanish Notario Mayor del Reino is the title held by the Minister of Justice as the person in charge of giving faith of the big events of the country like taking oath of high-ranking officials of the Kingdom. Among its most important tasks is the record of the swearing and promises of the King or Queen, the Prime Minister, the Ministers and the Secretaries of State.

Likewise, the First Notary of the Kingdom also intervened in the civil acts of the Spanish royal family, raising the records of the births, marriages and deaths of their individuals, and authorizing their marital capitulations, powers, assignments and other provisions and contracts. Said protocols and other papers of the civil acts that concern the royal family are kept in the dependencies of the Directorate-General of Registries and Notaries.

The title is exercised ex officio, from its appointment until its cessation as Minister of Justice. This position does not confer any notarial authority nor does it have any relationship with the General Council of the Notariat (the nationwide organization who represents the notaries), whose highest authority is the President of the General Council.

In case of the absence of the minister himself and as public notary, the Director-General of the Registries and the Notary, who is the secretary of the First Notary's Office, acts as the Acting First Notary of the Kingdom.

== See also ==
- Justice ministry
- List of ministers of justice of Catalonia
- Public Prosecutor (Autonomous Communities of Spain)
- Permanent Deputation and Council of Grandees of Spain and Titles of the Kingdom
