= Results of the November 2019 Spanish Congress election =

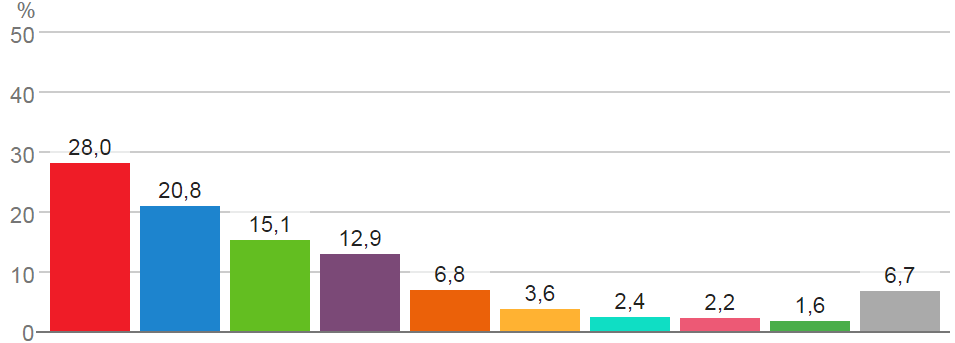
(Spain)	Main: November 2019 Spanish general election
← 2019 (Apr) 10 November 2019 2023 →
Party		Votes	%	Seats
	PSOE	6,792,199	28.0%	120
	PP	5,047,040	20.8%	89
	Vox	3,656,979	15.1%	52
	Unidas Podemos	3,119,364	12.9%	35
	Cs	1,650,318	6.8%	10
	ERC–Sobiranistes	880,734	3.6%	13
	Más País	582,306	2.4%	3
	JxCat–Junts	530,225	2.2%	8
	EAJ/PNV	379,002	1.6%	6
	Others	1,620,061	6.7%	14
Total		24,258,228	100.0%	350

This article presents the results breakdown of the election to the Congress of Deputies held in Spain on 10 November 2019. The following tables show detailed results in each of the country's 17 autonomous communities and in the autonomous cities of Ceuta and Melilla, as well as a summary of constituency and regional results.

== Nationwide ==
← Summary of the 10 November 2019 Congress of Deputies election results →
Parties and alliances	Popular vote			Seats	
Parties and alliances	Votes	%	±pp	Total	+/−
Spanish Socialist Workers' Party (PSOE)	6,792,199	28.00	−0.67	120	−3
People's Party (PP)	5,047,040	20.81	+4.12	89	+23
Vox (Vox)	3,656,979	15.08	+4.82	52	+28
United We Can (Unidas Podemos)	3,119,364	12.86	−1.46	35	−7
United We Can (Podemos–IU)	2,381,960	9.82	−1.24	26	−7
In Common We Can–Let's Win the Change (ECP–Guanyem el Canvi)	549,173	2.26	−0.09	7	±0
In Common–United We Can (Podemos–EU)	188,231	0.78	−0.13	2	±0
Citizens–Party of the Citizenry (Cs)	1,650,318	6.80	−9.06	10	−47
Republican Left of Catalonia–Sovereigntists (ERC–Sobiranistes)	880,734	3.63	−0.28	13	−2
Republican Left of Catalonia–Sovereigntists (ERC–Sobiranistes)	874,859	3.61	−0.28	13	−2
Republican Left of the Valencian Country (ERPV)	5,875	0.02	±0.00	0	±0
More Country (Más País)	582,306	2.40	New	3	+2
More Country–Equo (Más País–Equo)	330,345	1.36	New	2	+2
More Commitment (Més Compromís)^{1}	176,287	0.73	+0.07	1	±0
More Country (Más País)	52,478	0.22	New	0	±0
More Country–Aragonese Union–Equo (Más País–CHA–Equo)	23,196	0.10	New	0	±0
Together for Catalonia–Together (JxCat–Junts)	530,225	2.19	+0.28	8	+1
Basque Nationalist Party (EAJ/PNV)	379,002	1.56	+0.05	6	±0
Basque Country Gather (EH Bildu)	277,621	1.14	+0.15	5	+1
Popular Unity Candidacy–For Rupture (CUP–PR)	246,971	1.02	New	2	+2
Animalist Party Against Mistreatment of Animals (PACMA)	228,856	0.94	−0.31	0	±0
Canarian Coalition–New Canaries (CCa–PNC–NC)^{2}	124,289	0.51	−0.15	2	±0
Galician Nationalist Bloc (BNG)	120,456	0.50	+0.14	1	+1
Sum Navarre (NA+)	99,078	0.41	±0.00	2	±0
Regionalist Party of Cantabria (PRC)	68,830	0.28	+0.08	1	±0
Zero Cuts–Green Group (Recortes Cero–GV)	35,042	0.14	−0.04	0	±0
For a Fairer World (PUM+J)	27,272	0.11	+0.03	0	±0
Teruel Exists (¡TE!)	19,761	0.08	New	1	+1
More Left (Més–MxMe–esquerra)^{3}	18,295	0.08	−0.02	0	±0
Andalusia by Herself (AxSí)	14,046	0.06	+0.02	0	±0
Communist Party of the Peoples of Spain (PCPE)	13,828	0.06	−0.01	0	±0
Communist Party of the Workers of Spain (PCTE)	13,029	0.05	±0.00	0	±0
Yes to the Future (GBai)	12,709	0.05	−0.04	0	±0
Leonese People's Union (UPL)	10,243	0.04	New	0	±0
Spanish Communist Workers' Party (PCOE)	9,725	0.04	+0.01	0	±0
Coalition for Melilla (CpM)	8,955	0.04	+0.01	0	±0
Blank Seats (EB)	5,970	0.02	−0.01	0	±0
For Ávila (XAV)	5,416	0.02	New	0	±0
Forward–The Greens (Avant/Adelante–LV)	5,416	0.02	−0.01	0	±0
The Greens (Verdes)	3,287	0.01	New	0	±0
Humanist Party (PH)	3,150	0.01	−0.01	0	±0
Feminist Initiative (IFem)	3,005	0.01	New	0	±0
We Are Valencian in Movement (UiG–Som–CUIDES)	2,339	0.01	−0.01	0	±0
We Are Region (Somos Región)	2,328	0.01	−0.01	0	±0
Left in Positive (IZQP)	2,325	0.01	±0.00	0	±0
Canaries Now (ANC–UP)	2,032	0.01	±0.00	0	±0
With You, We Are Democracy (Contigo)	2,015	0.01	New	0	±0
Aragonese Union (CHA)	2,000	0.01	New	0	±0
Sorian People's Platform (PPSO)	1,466	0.01	±0.00	0	±0
United Extremadura (EU)	1,347	0.01	New	0	±0
European Retirees Social Democratic Party (PDSJE)	1,259	0.01	+0.01	0	±0
Libertarian Party (P–LIB)	1,171	0.00	±0.00	0	±0
Social Aragonese Movement (MAS)	1,068	0.00	New	0	±0
United–Acting for Democracy (Unidos SI–ACPS–DEf)	1,067	0.00	New	0	±0
Regionalist Party of the Leonese Country (PREPAL)	941	0.00	−0.01	0	±0
Andecha Astur (Andecha)	887	0.00	±0.00	0	±0
Movement for Dignity and Citizenship (MDyC)	819	0.00	New	0	±0
Puyalón (PYLN)	630	0.00	±0.00	0	±0
Spanish Phalanx of the CNSO (FE de las JONS)	616	0.00	±0.00	0	±0
At Once Valencian Community (aUna CV)	585	0.00	New	0	±0
Regionalist Union of Castile and León (Unión Regionalista)	530	0.00	±0.00	0	±0
Andalusian Convergence (CAnda)	520	0.00	New	0	±0
Federation of Independents of Aragon (FIA)	461	0.00	±0.00	0	±0
European Solidarity Action Party (Solidaria)	270	0.00	±0.00	0	±0
Andalusian Solidary Independent Republican Party (RISA)	249	0.00	±0.00	0	±0
Centered (centrados)	234	0.00	±0.00	0	±0
Plural Democracy (DPL)	214	0.00	±0.00	0	±0
Revolutionary Anticapitalist Left (IZAR)	113	0.00	±0.00	0	±0
XXI Convergence (C21)	72	0.00	±0.00	0	±0
Union of Everyone (UdT)	26	0.00	±0.00	0	±0
Blank ballots	217,227	0.90	+0.14		
Total	24,258,228			350	±0
Valid votes	24,258,228	98.98	+0.03		
Invalid votes	249,487	1.02	−0.03		
Votes cast / turnout	24,507,715	66.23	−5.53		
Abstentions	12,493,664	33.77	+5.53		
Registered voters	37,001,379				
Sources
Footnotes: ^{1} More Commitment results are compared to Commitment: Bloc–Initiative–Greens Equo totals in the April 2019 election.; ^{2} Canarian Coalition–New Canaries results are compared to the combined totals of Canarian Coalition–Canarian Nationalist Party and New Canaries in the April 2019 election.; ^{3} More Left results are compared to Progressive Voices totals in the April 2019 election.

== Summary ==
=== Constituencies ===

Summary of constituency results in the 10 November 2019 Congress of Deputies election
Constituency	PSOE		PP		Vox		UP		Cs		ERC–Sob		Más País		Junts		PNV		EH Bildu		CUP–PR		CCa–NC		BNG		NA+		PRC		¡TE!	
Constituency	%	S	%	S	%	S	%	S	%	S	%	S	%	S	%	S	%	S	%	S	%	S	%	S	%	S	%	S	%	S	%	S
A Coruña	30.0	3	30.5	3	8.2	−	12.6	1	4.6	−			2.1	−											9.5	1						
Álava	21.9	1	14.9	−	3.8	−	16.5	1	1.5	−							23.6	1	16.1	1												
Albacete	32.6	2	27.5	1	20.7	1	9.7	−	7.4	−																						
Alicante	28.2	4	24.3	3	19.7	3	12.7	1	8.1	1	0.2	−	4.2	−																		
Almería	29.5	2	25.8	2	26.7	2	8.1	−	7.6	−																						
Asturias	33.3	3	23.2	2	15.9	1	16.0	1	6.7	−			2.3	−																		
Ávila	26.2	1	34.8	1	18.5	1	6.5	−	6.5	−																						
Badajoz	38.4	3	25.1	2	17.3	1	9.2	−	8.0	−																						
Balearic Islands	25.4	2	22.8	2	17.1	2	18.1	2	7.4	−			2.3	−																		
Barcelona	21.8	8	7.7	2	6.3	2	15.5	5	5.9	2	21.1	7	1.4	−	11.7	4					6.1	2										
Biscay	19.1	2	8.8	1	2.4	−	15.4	1	1.1	−			1.4	−			35.2	3	15.0	1												
Burgos	32.3	2	30.8	2	14.9	−	11.1	−	8.1	−																						
Cáceres	38.1	2	27.6	1	16.0	1	9.0	−	7.0	−																						
Cádiz	30.6	3	18.0	2	21.3	2	15.2	1	9.0	1			1.8	−																		
Cantabria	23.2	1	25.9	2	14.9	1	8.7	−	4.8	−																			21.0	1		
Castellón	28.6	2	23.8	1	18.6	1	13.3	1	6.9	−	0.4	−	6.2	−																		
Ceuta	31.3	−	22.3	−	35.2	1	3.9	−	3.4	−																						
Ciudad Real	34.3	2	27.9	2	20.9	1	8.3	−	6.8	−																						
Córdoba	33.0	2	22.5	2	18.6	1	14.6	1	8.2	−																						
Cuenca	37.3	2	30.9	1	18.4	−	6.9	−	4.7	−																						
Gipuzkoa	18.1	1	6.2	−	1.9	−	15.0	1	1.0	−							30.5	2	25.8	2												
Girona	14.8	1	4.9	−	5.2	−	9.5	1	3.9	−	25.8	2			24.8	2					8.9	−										
Granada	33.2	3	21.8	2	20.7	1	12.3	1	7.8	−			1.8	−																		
Guadalajara	31.2	1	23.0	1	24.0	1	11.3	−	7.7	−																						
Huelva	36.6	3	19.7	1	20.9	1	12.1	−	7.3	−																						
Huesca	33.5	2	26.2	1	15.2	−	12.4	−	8.1	−																						
Jaén	38.8	3	22.5	1	19.7	1	9.8	−	6.8	−																						
La Rioja	34.9	2	34.2	2	11.5	−	9.9	−	7.1	−																						
Las Palmas	29.2	3	21.4	2	13.3	1	15.4	1	5.8	−			1.7	−									9.9	1								
León	33.5	2	28.4	1	15.6	1	10.5	−	6.4	−																						
Lleida	14.5	1	7.1	−	4.5	−	7.9	−	3.4	−	31.5	2			22.6	1					6.8	−										
Lugo	31.9	2	38.0	2	8.1	−	9.2	−	3.2	−															7.2	−						
Madrid	26.9	10	24.9	10	18.3	7	13.0	5	9.1	3			5.7	2																		
Málaga	30.0	4	21.6	3	21.4	2	12.9	1	8.9	1			1.9	−																		
Melilla	16.4	−	29.5	1	18.4	−	2.6	−	3.0	−																						
Murcia	24.8	3	26.5	3	28.0	3	8.9	1	7.4	−			1.9	−																		
Navarre	25.0	1			5.8	−	16.6	1											16.9	1							29.6	2				
Ourense	33.2	2	39.4	2	7.7	−	7.9	−	3.7	−															6.0	−						
Palencia	33.2	1	35.7	2	14.4	−	8.1	−	6.2	−																						
Pontevedra	31.8	3	29.1	3	7.3	−	15.5	1	4.6	−			2.0	−											7.5	−						
Salamanca	29.5	1	34.7	2	17.9	1	7.0	−	8.7	−																						
Santa Cruz de Tenerife	28.6	2	20.2	2	11.5	1	13.9	1	5.0	−			1.4	−									16.5	1								
Segovia	29.7	1	33.0	1	17.1	1	9.3	−	8.1	−																						
Seville	36.1	5	17.9	2	17.9	2	14.6	2	7.9	1			2.1	−																		
Soria	34.6	1	32.9	1	13.5	−	7.6	−	5.8	−																						
Tarragona	19.1	2	7.8	−	8.1	−	12.1	1	5.9	−	25.6	2			13.4	1					5.7	−										
Teruel	25.5	1	23.6	1	12.6	−	5.4	−	5.0	−																					26.7	1
Toledo	32.0	2	26.0	2	23.7	2	9.6	−	6.8	−																						
Valencia	27.0	4	22.1	4	17.7	3	13.8	2	7.7	1	0.2	−	8.8	1																		
Valladolid	30.3	2	29.5	2	18.1	1	11.0	−	8.7	−																						
Zamora	32.8	1	33.6	1	17.1	1	7.0	−	6.8	−																						
Zaragoza	30.8	3	23.4	2	18.0	1	11.3	1	9.2	−			4.5	−																		
Total	28.0	120	20.8	89	15.1	52	12.9	35	6.8	10	3.6	13	2.4	3	2.2	8	1.6	6	1.1	5	1.0	2	0.5	2	0.5	1	0.4	2	0.3	1	0.1	1

=== Regions ===

Summary of regional results in the 10 November 2019 Congress of Deputies election
Region	PSOE		PP		Vox		UP		Cs		ERC–Sob		Más País		Junts		PNV		EH Bildu		CUP–PR		CCa–NC		BNG		NA+		PRC		¡TE!	
Region	%	S	%	S	%	S	%	S	%	S	%	S	%	S	%	S	%	S	%	S	%	S	%	S	%	S	%	S	%	S	%	S
Andalusia	33.4	25	20.5	15	20.4	12	13.1	6	8.1	3			1.3	−																		
Aragon	30.7	6	23.9	4	17.0	1	10.8	1	8.6	−			3.3	−																	2.8	1
Asturias	33.3	3	23.2	2	15.9	1	16.0	1	6.7	−			2.3	−																		
Balearic Islands	25.4	2	22.8	2	17.1	2	18.1	2	7.4	−			2.3	−																		
Basque Country	19.2	4	8.8	1	2.4	−	15.4	3	1.1	−			0.7	−			32.0	6	18.7	4												
Canary Islands	28.9	5	20.8	4	12.5	2	14.7	2	5.4	−			1.6	−									13.1	2								
Cantabria	23.2	1	25.9	2	14.9	1	8.7	−	4.8	−																			21.0	1		
Castile and León	31.3	12	31.6	13	16.6	6	9.3	−	7.6	−																						
Castilla–La Mancha	33.1	9	26.9	7	21.9	5	9.2	−	6.8	−																						
Catalonia	20.5	12	7.4	2	6.3	2	14.2	7	5.6	2	22.6	13	1.1	−	13.7	8					6.4	2										
Ceuta	31.3	−	22.3	−	35.2	1	3.9	−	3.4	−																						
Extremadura	38.3	5	26.0	3	16.8	2	9.1	−	7.6	−																						
Galicia	31.2	10	31.9	10	7.8	−	12.6	2	4.3	−			1.5	−											8.1	1						
La Rioja	34.9	2	34.3	2	11.5	−	9.8	−	7.1	−																						
Madrid	26.9	10	24.9	10	18.3	7	13.0	5	9.1	3			5.7	2																		
Melilla	16.4	−	29.5	1	18.4	−	2.6	−	3.0	−																						
Murcia	24.8	3	26.5	3	28.0	3	8.9	1	7.4	−			1.9	−																		
Navarre	25.0	1			5.8	−	16.6	1											16.9	1							29.6	2				
Valencian Community	27.6	10	23.0	8	18.5	7	13.4	4	7.7	2	0.2	−	7.0	1																		
Total	28.0	120	20.8	89	15.1	52	12.9	35	6.8	10	3.6	13	2.4	3	2.2	8	1.6	6	1.1	5	1.0	2	0.5	2	0.5	1	0.4	2	0.3	1	0.1	1

== Autonomous communities ==
=== Andalusia ===
← Summary of the 10 November 2019 Congress of Deputies election results in Andalusia →
Parties and alliances	Popular vote			Seats	
Parties and alliances	Votes	%	±pp	Total	+/−
Spanish Socialist Workers' Party (PSOE)	1,425,126	33.36	−0.86	25	+1
People's Party (PP)	877,202	20.54	+3.36	15	+4
Vox (Vox)	869,909	20.36	+6.99	12	+6
United We Can (Podemos–IULV–CA)	559,628	13.10	−1.19	6	−3
Citizens–Party of the Citizenry (Cs)	346,094	8.10	−9.60	3	−8
More Country–Andalusia (Más País–Andalucía)	56,445	1.32	New	0	±0
Animalist Party Against Mistreatment of Animals (PACMA)	47,485	1.11	−0.24	0	±0
Andalusia by Herself (AxSí)	14,046	0.33	+0.08	0	±0
Zero Cuts–Green Group (Recortes Cero–GV)	6,045	0.14	−0.03	0	±0
Spanish Communist Workers' Party (PCOE)	6,025	0.14	+0.02	0	±0
For a Fairer World (PUM+J)	5,256	0.12	+0.03	0	±0
Communist Party of the Andalusian People (PCPA)	3,439	0.08	−0.02	0	±0
Communist Party of the Workers of Spain (PCTE)	2,157	0.05	±0.00	0	±0
Blank Seats (EB)	1,273	0.03	±0.00	0	±0
Andalusian Convergence (CAnda)	520	0.01	New	0	±0
Andalusian Solidary Independent Republican Party (RISA)	249	0.01	+0.01	0	±0
Revolutionary Anticapitalist Left (IZAR)	113	0.00	−0.01	0	±0
Blank ballots	50,672	1.19	+0.25		
Total	4,271,684			61	±0
Valid votes	4,271,684	98.50	−0.18		
Invalid votes	65,040	1.50	+0.18		
Votes cast / turnout	4,336,724	65.91	−4.87		
Abstentions	2,242,656	34.09	+4.87		
Registered voters	6,579,380				

=== Aragon ===
← Summary of the 10 November 2019 Congress of Deputies election results in Aragon →
Parties and alliances	Popular vote			Seats	
Parties and alliances	Votes	%	±pp	Total	+/−
Spanish Socialist Workers' Party (PSOE)	215,361	30.72	−1.02	6	+1
People's Party (PP)	167,233	23.86	+4.96	4	+1
Vox (Vox)	118,936	16.97	+4.78	1	±0
United We Can (Podemos–IU)	75,892	10.83	−2.75	1	±0
Citizens–Party of the Citizenry (Cs)	59,977	8.56	−11.97	0	−3
More Country–Aragonese Union–Equo (Más País–CHA–Equo)	23,196	3.31	New	0	±0
Teruel Exists (¡TE!)	19,761	2.82	New	1	+1
Animalist Party Against Mistreatment of Animals (PACMA)	4,565	0.65	−0.27	0	±0
Blank Seats (EB)	2,333	0.33	−0.11	0	±0
Aragonese Union (CHA)	2,000	0.29	New	0	±0
Social Aragonese Movement (MAS)	1,068	0.15	New	0	±0
Zero Cuts–Green Group (Recortes Cero–GV)	1,059	0.15	−0.09	0	±0
For a Fairer World (PUM+J)	673	0.10	−0.03	0	±0
Puyalón (PYLN)	630	0.09	−0.02	0	±0
Communist Party of the Workers of Spain (PCTE)	500	0.07	−0.01	0	±0
Communist Party of the Peoples of Spain (PCPE)	476	0.07	−0.03	0	±0
Federation of Independents of Aragon (FIA)	461	0.07	−0.03	0	±0
Spanish Communist Workers' Party (PCOE)	96	0.01	New	0	±0
Union of Everyone (UdT)	26	0.00	±0.00	0	±0
At Once Valencian Community (aUna CV)	13	0.00	New	0	±0
Blank ballots	6,755	0.96	+0.04		
Total	701,011			13	±0
Valid votes	701,011	99.14	+0.21		
Invalid votes	6,080	0.86	−0.21		
Votes cast / turnout	707,091	69.34	−5.86		
Abstentions	312,671	30.66	+5.86		
Registered voters	1,019,762				

=== Asturias ===
← Summary of the 10 November 2019 Congress of Deputies election results in Asturias →
Parties and alliances	Popular vote			Seats	
Parties and alliances	Votes	%	±pp	Total	+/−
Spanish Socialist Workers' Party (PSOE)	186,211	33.27	+0.14	3	±0
People's Party–Forum (PP–Foro)	129,945	23.22	+5.32	2	+1
United We Can (Podemos–IX)	89,301	15.95	−1.19	1	±0
Vox (Vox)	88,788	15.86	+4.37	1	±0
Citizens–Party of the Citizenry (Cs)	37,374	6.68	−10.03	0	−1
More Country–Equo (Más País–Equo)	12,732	2.27	New	0	±0
Animalist Party Against Mistreatment of Animals (PACMA)	4,412	0.79	−0.27	0	±0
Andecha Astur (Andecha)	887	0.16	+0.01	0	±0
Communist Party of the Workers of Spain (PCTE)	843	0.15	−0.07	0	±0
Zero Cuts–Green Group (Recortes Cero–GV)	732	0.13	−0.05	0	±0
Communist Party of the Peoples of Spain (PCPE)	626	0.11	New	0	±0
For a Fairer World (PUM+J)	487	0.09	−0.03	0	±0
Humanist Party (PH)	366	0.07	−0.01	0	±0
Blank ballots	7,041	1.26	+0.17		
Total	559,745			7	±0
Valid votes	559,745	99.03	+0.13		
Invalid votes	5,486	0.97	−0.13		
Votes cast / turnout	565,231	58.12	−6.90		
Abstentions	407,349	41.88	+6.90		
Registered voters	972,580				

=== Balearic Islands ===
← Summary of the 10 November 2019 Congress of Deputies election results in the Balearic Islands →
Parties and alliances	Popular vote			Seats	
Parties and alliances	Votes	%	±pp	Total	+/−
Spanish Socialist Workers' Party (PSOE)	115,567	25.44	−0.92	2	−1
People's Party (PP)	103,722	22.84	+5.99	2	+1
United We Can (Podemos–EUIB)	82,225	18.10	+0.26	2	±0
Vox (Vox)	77,520	17.07	+5.77	2	+1
Citizens–Party of the Citizenry (Cs)	33,451	7.36	−10.06	0	−1
More Left (Més–MxMe–esquerra)^{1}	18,295	4.03	−0.83	0	±0
More Country (Más País)	10,652	2.35	New	0	±0
Animalist Party Against Mistreatment of Animals (PACMA)	6,207	1.37	−0.34	0	±0
Zero Cuts–Green Group (Recortes Cero–GV)	947	0.21	−0.02	0	±0
For a Fairer World (PUM+J)	573	0.13	±0.00	0	±0
Libertarian Party (P–LIB)	372	0.08	New	0	±0
Blank ballots	4,668	1.03	+0.13		
Total	454,199			8	±0
Valid votes	454,199	99.04	+0.11		
Invalid votes	4,393	0.96	−0.11		
Votes cast / turnout	458,592	56.81	−8.56		
Abstentions	348,578	43.19	+8.56		
Registered voters	807,170				
Sources
Footnotes: ^{1} More Left results are compared to Progressive Voices totals in the April 2019 election.

=== Basque Country ===
← Summary of the 10 November 2019 Congress of Deputies election results in the Basque Country →
Parties and alliances	Popular vote			Seats	
Parties and alliances	Votes	%	±pp	Total	+/−
Basque Nationalist Party (EAJ/PNV)	379,002	32.01	+1.00	6	±0
Socialist Party of the Basque Country–Basque Country Left (PSE–EE (PSOE))	227,396	19.21	−0.69	4	±0
Basque Country Gather (EH Bildu)	221,073	18.67	+1.99	4	±0
United We Can (Podemos–IU)	182,674	15.43	−2.16	3	−1
People's Party (PP)	104,746	8.85	+1.40	1	+1
Vox (Vox)	28,979	2.45	+0.24	0	±0
Citizens–Party of the Citizenry (Cs)	13,279	1.12	−2.04	0	±0
More Country–Ecologist Candidacy (Más País–Candidatura Ecologista)	8,542	0.72	New	0	±0
Animalist Party Against Mistreatment of Animals (PACMA)	7,005	0.59	−0.29	0	±0
Zero Cuts–Green Group (Recortes Cero–GV)	1,672	0.14	−0.04	0	±0
For a Fairer World (PUM+J)	1,221	0.10	−0.03	0	±0
Communist Party of the Workers of the Basque Country (PCTE/ELAK)	982	0.08	−0.01	0	±0
Blank Seats (EB/AZ)	570	0.05	±0.00	0	±0
European Solidarity Action Party (Solidaria)	270	0.02	−0.02	0	±0
Blank ballots	6,624	0.56	−0.07		
Total	1,184,035			18	±0
Valid votes	1,184,035	99.44	+0.14		
Invalid votes	6,687	0.56	−0.14		
Votes cast / turnout	1,190,722	66.43	−5.35		
Abstentions	601,832	33.57	+5.35		
Registered voters	1,792,554				

=== Canary Islands ===
← Summary of the 10 November 2019 Congress of Deputies election results in the Canary Islands →
Parties and alliances	Popular vote			Seats	
Parties and alliances	Votes	%	±pp	Total	+/−
Spanish Socialist Workers' Party (PSOE)	273,596	28.88	+1.05	5	±0
People's Party (PP)	196,809	20.77	+5.24	4	+1
United We Can (Podemos–IU)	139,261	14.70	−1.02	2	−1
Canarian Coalition–New Canaries (CCa–PNC–NC)^{1}	124,289	13.12	+0.15	2	±0
Vox (Vox)	118,006	12.45	+5.89	2	+2
Citizens–Party of the Citizenry (Cs)	50,997	5.38	−9.29	0	−2
More Country–Equo (Más País–Equo)	14,972	1.58	New	0	±0
Animalist Party Against Mistreatment of Animals (PACMA)	11,946	1.26	−0.42	0	±0
The Greens (Verdes)	3,186	0.34	New	0	±0
Canaries Now (ANC–UP)	2,032	0.21	−0.08	0	±0
Communist Party of the Canarian People (PCPC)	1,192	0.13	−0.01	0	±0
Zero Cuts–Green Group (Recortes Cero–GV)	994	0.10	−0.15	0	±0
For a Fairer World (PUM+J)	871	0.09	−0.04	0	±0
European Retirees Social Democratic Party (PDSJE)	713	0.08	New	0	±0
With You, We Are Democracy (Contigo)	594	0.06	New	0	±0
Blank Seats (EB)	418	0.04	New	0	±0
Humanist Party (PH)	276	0.03	−0.02	0	±0
Blank ballots	7,355	0.78	+0.06		
Total	947,507			15	±0
Valid votes	947,507	98.97	+0.16		
Invalid votes	9,869	1.03	−0.16		
Votes cast / turnout	957,376	55.44	−7.02		
Abstentions	769,490	44.56	+7.02		
Registered voters	1,726,866				
Sources
Footnotes: ^{1} Canarian Coalition–New Canaries results are compared to the combined totals of Canarian Coalition–Canarian Nationalist Party and New Canaries in the April 2019 election.

=== Cantabria ===
← Summary of the 10 November 2019 Congress of Deputies election results in Cantabria →
Parties and alliances	Popular vote			Seats	
Parties and alliances	Votes	%	±pp	Total	+/−
People's Party (PP)	84,583	25.86	+4.17	2	+1
Spanish Socialist Workers' Party (PSOE)	76,028	23.24	−1.97	1	−1
Regionalist Party of Cantabria (PRC)	68,830	21.04	+6.49	1	±0
Vox (Vox)	48,827	14.93	+3.75	1	+1
United We Can (Podemos–IU)	28,376	8.68	−1.56	0	±0
Citizens–Party of the Citizenry (Cs)	15,609	4.77	−10.37	0	−1
Animalist Party Against Mistreatment of Animals (PACMA)	1,856	0.57	−0.28	0	±0
Communist Party of the Peoples of Spain (PCPE)	262	0.08	±0.00	0	±0
Blank Seats (EB)	259	0.08	−0.04	0	±0
Communist Party of the Workers of Spain (PCTE)	247	0.08	+0.01	0	±0
Zero Cuts–Green Group (Recortes Cero–GV)	232	0.07	−0.02	0	±0
For a Fairer World (PUM+J)	187	0.06	−0.02	0	±0
Libertarian Party (P–LIB)	126	0.04	−0.01	0	±0
Blank ballots	1,667	0.51	−0.13		
Total	327,089			5	±0
Valid votes	327,089	99.17	+0.22		
Invalid votes	2,732	0.83	−0.22		
Votes cast / turnout	329,821	65.74	−6.64		
Abstentions	171,855	34.26	+6.64		
Registered voters	501,676				

=== Castile and León ===
← Summary of the 10 November 2019 Congress of Deputies election results in Castile and León →
Parties and alliances	Popular vote			Seats	
Parties and alliances	Votes	%	±pp	Total	+/−
People's Party (PP)	438,993	31.61	+5.60	13	+3
Spanish Socialist Workers' Party (PSOE)	434,287	31.27	+1.48	12	±0
Vox (Vox)	230,743	16.61	+4.33	6	+5
United We Can (Podemos–IU)	129,681	9.34	−1.08	0	±0
Citizens–Party of the Citizenry (Cs)	105,200	7.57	−11.32	0	−8
Leonese People's Union (UPL)	10,243	0.74	New	0	±0
For Ávila (XAV)	5,416	0.39	New	0	±0
Animalist Party Against Mistreatment of Animals (PACMA)	8,085	0.58	−0.16	0	±0
Zero Cuts–Green Group–PCAS–TC (Recortes Cero–GV–PCAS–TC)	2,499	0.18	±0.00	0	±0
For a Fairer World (PUM+J)	2,471	0.18	+0.02	0	±0
Communist Party of the Workers of Spain (PCTE)	1,741	0.13	+0.01	0	±0
Sorian People's Platform (PPSO)	1,466	0.11	−0.07	0	±0
Regionalist Party of the Leonese Country (PREPAL)	941	0.07	−0.07	0	±0
Regionalist Union of Castile and León (Unión Regionalista)	530	0.04	+0.01	0	±0
Spanish Phalanx of the CNSO (FE de las JONS)	291	0.02	−0.01	0	±0
Centered (centrados)	234	0.02	−0.01	0	±0
With You, We Are Democracy (Contigo)	229	0.02	New	0	±0
Communist Party of the Peoples of Spain (PCPE)	223	0.02	±0.00	0	±0
Spanish Communist Workers' Party (PCOE)	173	0.01	±0.00	0	±0
European Retirees Social Democratic Party (PDSJE)	115	0.01	New	0	±0
Libertarian Party (P–LIB)	70	0.01	New	0	±0
Blank ballots	15,167	1.09	+0.17		
Total	1,388,798			31	±0
Valid votes	1,388,798	98.73	+0.04		
Invalid votes	17,901	1.27	−0.04		
Votes cast / turnout	1,406,699	66.61	−6.26		
Abstentions	705,179	33.39	+6.26		
Registered voters	2,111,878				

=== Castilla–La Mancha ===
← Summary of the 10 November 2019 Congress of Deputies election results in Castilla–La Mancha →
Parties and alliances	Popular vote			Seats	
Parties and alliances	Votes	%	±pp	Total	+/−
Spanish Socialist Workers' Party (PSOE)	360,013	33.10	+0.72	9	±0
People's Party (PP)	292,212	26.87	+4.21	7	+1
Vox (Vox)	238,196	21.90	+6.62	5	+3
United We Can (Podemos–IU)	100,284	9.22	−0.95	0	±0
Citizens–Party of the Citizenry (Cs)	74,418	6.84	−10.64	0	−4
Animalist Party Against Mistreatment of Animals (PACMA)	7,930	0.73	−0.20	0	±0
For a Fairer World (PUM+J)	1,933	0.18	+0.08	0	±0
Zero Cuts–Green Group–PCAS–TC (Recortes Cero–GV–PCAS–TC)	1,637	0.15	−0.02	0	±0
Communist Party of the Peoples of Spain (PCPE)	629	0.06	+0.04	0	±0
Communist Party of the Workers of Spain (PCTE)	542	0.05	+0.03	0	±0
European Retirees Social Democratic Party (PDSJE)	431	0.04	+0.02	0	±0
Spanish Communist Workers' Party (PCOE)	195	0.02	−0.01	0	±0
Spanish Phalanx of the CNSO (FE de las JONS)	188	0.02	New	0	±0
Libertarian Party (P–LIB)	47	0.00	±0.00	0	±0
Blank ballots	8,990	0.83	+0.10		
Total	1,087,645			21	±0
Valid votes	1,087,645	98.67	+0.06		
Invalid votes	14,694	1.33	−0.06		
Votes cast / turnout	1,102,339	70.06	−6.51		
Abstentions	471,006	29.94	+6.51		
Registered voters	1,573,345				

=== Catalonia ===
← Summary of the 10 November 2019 Congress of Deputies election results in Catalonia →
Parties and alliances	Popular vote			Seats	
Parties and alliances	Votes	%	±pp	Total	+/−
Republican Left of Catalonia–Sovereigntists (ERC–Sobiranistes)	874,859	22.57	−2.04	13	−2
Socialists' Party of Catalonia (PSC–PSOE)	794,666	20.50	−2.71	12	±0
In Common We Can–Let's Win the Change (ECP–Guanyem el Canvi)	549,173	14.17	−0.68	7	±0
Together for Catalonia–Together (JxCat–Junts)	530,225	13.68	+1.60	8	+1
People's Party (PP)	287,714	7.42	+2.58	2	+1
Popular Unity Candidacy–For Rupture (CUP–PR)	246,971	6.37	New	2	+2
Vox (Vox)	243,640	6.29	+2.70	2	+1
Citizens–Party of the Citizenry (Cs)	217,935	5.62	−5.94	2	−3
Animalist Party Against Mistreatment of Animals (PACMA)	44,585	1.15	−0.39	0	±0
More Country (Más País)	41,826	1.08	New	0	±0
Zero Cuts–Green Group (Recortes Cero–GV)	5,922	0.15	−0.02	0	±0
Feminist Initiative (IFem)	3,005	0.08	New	0	±0
For a Fairer World (PUM+J)	2,436	0.06	+0.05	0	±0
Communist Party of the Workers of Catalonia (PCTC)	2,220	0.06	±0.00	0	±0
Communist Party of the Catalan People (PCPC)	2,145	0.06	−0.02	0	±0
Left in Positive (IZQP)	1,891	0.05	−0.02	0	±0
Blank ballots	27,019	0.70	+0.16		
Total	3,876,232			48	±0
Valid votes	3,876,232	99.47	−0.04		
Invalid votes	20,742	0.53	+0.04		
Votes cast / turnout	3,896,974	69.40	−5.17		
Abstentions	1,718,446	30.60	+5.17		
Registered voters	5,615,420				

=== Extremadura ===
← Summary of the 10 November 2019 Congress of Deputies election results in Extremadura →
Parties and alliances	Popular vote			Seats	
Parties and alliances	Votes	%	±pp	Total	+/−
Spanish Socialist Workers' Party (PSOE)	227,447	38.33	+0.26	5	±0
People's Party (PP)	154,269	26.00	+4.62	3	+1
Vox (Vox)	99,823	16.82	+6.05	2	+1
United We Can (Podemos–IU)	54,072	9.11	−0.41	0	±0
Citizens–Party of the Citizenry (Cs)	45,053	7.59	−10.37	0	−2
Animalist Party Against Mistreatment of Animals (PACMA)	3,676	0.62	−0.09	0	±0
United Extremadura (EU)	1,347	0.23	New	0	±0
For a Fairer World (PUM+J)	1,220	0.21	+0.14	0	±0
Zero Cuts–Green Group (Recortes Cero–GV)	1,016	0.17	+0.04	0	±0
Blank ballots	5,493	0.93	+0.14		
Total	593,416			10	±0
Valid votes	593,416	98.16	−0.21		
Invalid votes	11,145	1.84	+0.21		
Votes cast / turnout	604,561	67.22	−6.95		
Abstentions	294,878	32.78	+6.95		
Registered voters	899,439				

=== Galicia ===
← Summary of the 10 November 2019 Congress of Deputies election results in Galicia →
Parties and alliances	Popular vote			Seats	
Parties and alliances	Votes	%	±pp	Total	+/−
People's Party (PP)	475,198	31.93	+4.51	10	+1
Socialists' Party of Galicia (PSdeG–PSOE)	465,026	31.25	−0.84	10	±0
In Common–United We Can (Podemos–EU)	188,231	12.65	−1.81	2	±0
Galician Nationalist Bloc (BNG)	120,456	8.09	+2.35	1	+1
Vox (Vox)	116,381	7.82	+2.53	0	±0
Citizens–Party of the Citizenry (Cs)	64,661	4.35	−6.83	0	−2
More Country–Equo (Más País–Equo)	22,826	1.53	New	0	±0
Animalist Party Against Mistreatment of Animals (PACMA)	11,475	0.77	−0.28	0	±0
Zero Cuts–Green Group (Recortes Cero–GV)	2,173	0.15	−0.02	0	±0
Spanish Communist Workers' Party (PCOE)	1,867	0.13	+0.02	0	±0
For a Fairer World (PUM+J)	1,582	0.11	+0.10	0	±0
Communist Party of the Workers of Galicia (PCTG)	1,258	0.08	−0.02	0	±0
Blank Seats (EB)	692	0.05	±0.00	0	±0
XXI Convergence (C21)	72	0.00	±0.00	0	±0
Blank ballots	16,209	1.09	+0.04		
Total	1,488,107			23	±0
Valid votes	1,488,107	98.72	+0.25		
Invalid votes	19,259	1.28	−0.25		
Votes cast / turnout	1,507,366	55.86	−6.01		
Abstentions	1,191,332	44.14	+6.01		
Registered voters	2,698,698				

=== La Rioja ===
← Summary of the 10 November 2019 Congress of Deputies election results in La Rioja →
Parties and alliances	Popular vote			Seats	
Parties and alliances	Votes	%	±pp	Total	+/−
Spanish Socialist Workers' Party (PSOE)	57,485	34.85	+3.16	2	±0
People's Party (PP)	56,450	34.23	+7.72	2	+1
Vox (Vox)	18,908	11.46	+2.47	0	±0
United We Can (Podemos–IU)	16,273	9.87	−1.93	0	±0
Citizens–Party of the Citizenry (Cs)	11,673	7.08	−10.72	0	−1
Animalist Party Against Mistreatment of Animals (PACMA)	1,096	0.66	−0.11	0	±0
Blank Seats (EB)	425	0.26	+0.05	0	±0
Zero Cuts–Green Group (Recortes Cero–GV)	307	0.19	+0.04	0	±0
For a Fairer World (PUM+J)	297	0.18	+0.07	0	±0
Communist Party of the Workers of Spain (PCTE)	263	0.16	New	0	±0
Blank ballots	1,757	1.07	+0.26		
Total	164,934			4	±0
Valid votes	164,934	98.44	−0.19		
Invalid votes	2,615	1.56	+0.19		
Votes cast / turnout	167,549	66.96	−6.42		
Abstentions	82,664	33.04	+6.42		
Registered voters	250,213				

=== Madrid ===
← Summary of the 10 November 2019 Congress of Deputies election results in Madrid →
Parties and alliances	Popular vote			Seats	
Parties and alliances	Votes	%	±pp	Total	+/−
Spanish Socialist Workers' Party (PSOE)	957,401	26.87	−0.40	10	−1
People's Party (PP)	887,474	24.91	+6.27	10	+3
Vox (Vox)	653,476	18.34	+4.48	7	+2
United We Can (Podemos–IU)	463,629	13.01	−3.22	5	−1
Citizens–Party of the Citizenry (Cs)	323,076	9.07	−11.88	3	−5
More Country–Equo (Más País–Equo)	201,389	5.65	New	2	+2
Animalist Party Against Mistreatment of Animals (PACMA)	31,983	0.90	−0.45	0	±0
Zero Cuts–Green Group–PCAS–TC (Recortes Cero–GV–PCAS–TC)	5,129	0.14	−0.06	0	±0
For a Fairer World (PUM+J)	4,305	0.12	−0.02	0	±0
Humanist Party (PH)	2,508	0.07	−0.02	0	±0
Communist Party of the Peoples of Spain (PCPE)	2,099	0.06	+0.01	0	±0
Communist Party of the Workers of Spain (PCTE)	1,895	0.05	−0.01	0	±0
Blank ballots	28,783	0.81	+0.16		
Total	3,563,147			37	±0
Valid votes	3,563,147	99.21	+0.05		
Invalid votes	28,317	0.79	−0.05		
Votes cast / turnout	3,591,464	70.59	−4.87		
Abstentions	1,496,629	29.41	+4.87		
Registered voters	5,088,093				

=== Murcia ===
← Summary of the 10 November 2019 Congress of Deputies election results in Murcia →
Parties and alliances	Popular vote			Seats	
Parties and alliances	Votes	%	±pp	Total	+/−
Vox (Vox)	199,829	27.95	+9.33	3	+1
People's Party (PP)	189,500	26.51	+3.08	3	+1
Spanish Socialist Workers' Party (PSOE)	177,154	24.78	+0.01	3	±0
United We Can (Podemos–IU)	63,461	8.88	−1.53	1	±0
Citizens–Party of the Citizenry (Cs)	53,201	7.44	−12.10	0	−2
More Country–Equo (Más País–Equo)	13,439	1.88	New	0	±0
Animalist Party Against Mistreatment of Animals (PACMA)	7,005	0.98	−0.40	0	±0
We Are Region (Somos Región)	2,328	0.33	−0.32	0	±0
Spanish Communist Workers' Party (PCOE)	990	0.14	−0.01	0	±0
Zero Cuts–Green Group (Recortes Cero–GV)	881	0.12	−0.06	0	±0
Communist Party of the Peoples of Spain (PCPE)	490	0.07	−0.02	0	±0
Left in Positive (IZQP)	434	0.06	−0.03	0	±0
For a Fairer World (PUM+J)	431	0.06	New	0	±0
With You, We Are Democracy (Contigo)	317	0.04	New	0	±0
Plural Democracy (DPL)	214	0.03	−0.04	0	±0
Blank ballots	5,253	0.73	+0.11		
Total	714,927			10	±0
Valid votes	714,927	98.97	+0.04		
Invalid votes	7,418	1.03	−0.04		
Votes cast / turnout	722,345	68.03	−5.50		
Abstentions	339,496	31.97	+5.50		
Registered voters	1,061,841				

=== Navarre ===
← Summary of the 10 November 2019 Congress of Deputies election results in Navarre →
Parties and alliances	Popular vote			Seats	
Parties and alliances	Votes	%	±pp	Total	+/−
Sum Navarre (NA+)	99,078	29.58	+0.26	2	±0
Spanish Socialist Workers' Party (PSOE)	83,734	25.00	−0.76	1	−1
Basque Country Gather (EH Bildu)	56,548	16.88	+4.14	1	+1
United We Can (Podemos–IU–Batzarre)	55,498	16.57	−2.07	1	±0
Vox (Vox)	19,440	5.80	+0.96	0	±0
Yes to the Future (GBai)	12,709	3.79	−2.29	0	±0
Animalist Party Against Mistreatment of Animals (PACMA)	2,250	0.67	−0.24	0	±0
Zero Cuts–Green Group (Recortes Cero–GV)	965	0.29	−0.06	0	±0
For a Fairer World (PUM+J)	928	0.28	−0.05	0	±0
Communist Party of the Workers of Spain (PCTE/ELAK)	381	0.11	New	0	±0
Blank ballots	3,451	1.03	±0.00		
Total	334,982			5	±0
Valid votes	334,982	99.11	+0.11		
Invalid votes	3,014	0.89	−0.11		
Votes cast / turnout	337,996	65.91	−6.62		
Abstentions	174,830	34.09	+6.62		
Registered voters	512,826				

=== Valencian Community ===
← Summary of the 10 November 2019 Congress of Deputies election results in the Valencian Community →
Parties and alliances	Popular vote			Seats	
Parties and alliances	Votes	%	±pp	Total	+/−
Spanish Socialist Workers' Party (PSOE)	700,159	27.60	−0.18	10	±0
People's Party (PP)	584,415	23.04	+4.48	8	+1
Vox (Vox)	468,134	18.46	+6.45	7	+4
United We Can (Podemos–EUPV)	339,596	13.39	−0.85	4	−1
Citizens–Party of the Citizenry (Cs)	196,265	7.74	−10.24	2	−4
More Commitment (Més Compromís)^{1}	176,287	6.95	+0.48	1	±0
Animalist Party Against Mistreatment of Animals (PACMA)	27,295	1.08	−0.31	0	±0
Republican Left of the Valencian Country (ERPV)	5,875	0.23	+0.07	0	±0
Forward–The Greens (Avant/Adelante–LV)	5,416	0.21	−0.06	0	±0
Zero Cuts–Green Group (Recortes Cero–GV)	2,688	0.11	−0.04	0	±0
We Are Valencian in Movement (UiG–Som–CUIDES)	2,339	0.09	−0.08	0	±0
For a Fairer World (PUM+J)	2,327	0.09	+0.08	0	±0
Communist Party of the Peoples of Spain (PCPE)	2,247	0.09	−0.03	0	±0
United–Acting for Democracy (Unidos SI–ACPS–DEf)	1,067	0.04	New	0	±0
With You, We Are Democracy (Contigo)	875	0.03	New	0	±0
At Once Valencian Community (aUna CV)	572	0.02	New	0	±0
Libertarian Party (P–LIB)	556	0.02	−0.02	0	±0
Spanish Communist Workers' Party (PCOE)	379	0.01	New	0	±0
Spanish Phalanx of the CNSO (FE de las JONS)	137	0.01	±0.00	0	±0
Blank ballots	19,814	0.78	+0.12		
Total	2,536,443			32	±0
Valid votes	2,536,443	99.08	+0.16		
Invalid votes	23,504	0.92	−0.16		
Votes cast / turnout	2,559,947	69.80	−4.49		
Abstentions	1,107,681	30.20	+4.49		
Registered voters	3,667,628				
Sources
Footnotes: ^{1} More Commitment results are compared to Commitment: Bloc–Initiative–Greens Equo totals in the April 2019 election.

== Autonomous cities ==
=== Ceuta ===
← Summary of the 10 November 2019 Congress of Deputies election results in Ceuta →
Parties and alliances	Popular vote			Seats	
Parties and alliances	Votes	%	±pp	Total	+/−
Vox (Vox)	11,752	35.19	+11.26	1	+1
Spanish Socialist Workers' Party (PSOE)	10,455	31.31	−5.01	0	−1
People's Party (PP)	7,439	22.28	+0.84	0	±0
United We Can (Podemos–IU)	1,300	3.89	−0.95	0	±0
Citizens–Party of the Citizenry (Cs)	1,138	3.41	−8.56	0	±0
Movement for Dignity and Citizenship (MDyC)	819	2.45	New	0	±0
Zero Cuts–Green Group (Recortes Cero–GV)	125	0.37	−0.04	0	±0
For a Fairer World (PUM+J)	43	0.13	−0.10	0	±0
Blank ballots	324	0.97	+0.12		
Total	33,395			1	±0
Valid votes	33,395	98.96	+0.15		
Invalid votes	351	1.04	−0.15		
Votes cast / turnout	33,746	53.98	−7.46		
Abstentions	28,767	46.02	+7.46		
Registered voters	62,513				

=== Melilla ===
← Summary of the 10 November 2019 Congress of Deputies election results in Melilla →
Parties and alliances	Popular vote			Seats	
Parties and alliances	Votes	%	±pp	Total	+/−
People's Party (PP)	9,136	29.54	+5.58	1	±0
Coalition for Melilla (CpM)	8,955	28.95	+8.64	0	±0
Vox (Vox)	5,692	18.40	+1.20	0	±0
Spanish Socialist Workers' Party (PSOE)	5,087	16.45	−4.25	0	±0
Citizens–Party of the Citizenry (Cs)	917	2.96	−9.93	0	±0
United We Can (Podemos–IU)	809	2.62	−1.21	0	±0
The Greens (Verdes)	101	0.33	New	0	±0
For a Fairer World (PUM+J)	31	0.10	−0.02	0	±0
Zero Cuts–Green Group (Recortes Cero–GV)	19	0.06	−0.23	0	±0
Blank ballots	185	0.60	−0.10		
Total	30,932			1	±0
Valid votes	30,932	99.23	+0.17		
Invalid votes	240	0.77	−0.17		
Votes cast / turnout	31,172	52.39	−5.14		
Abstentions	28,325	47.61	+5.14		
Registered voters	59,497				
