= Joan Josep Nuet =

Spanish politician (born 1964)

Joan Josep Nuet MP
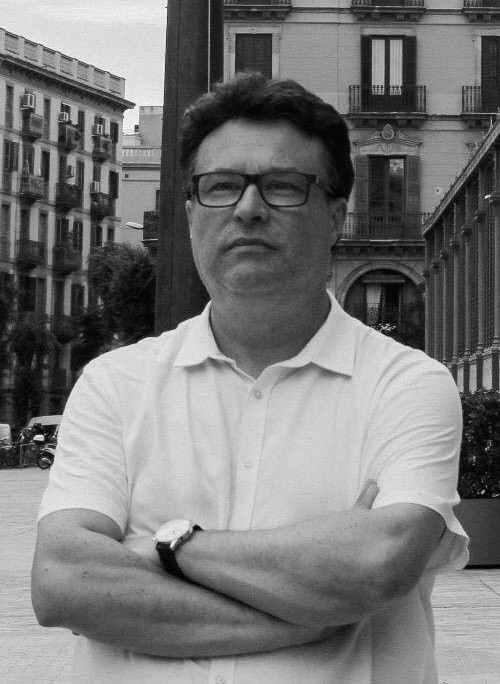
- Nuet in May 2018

Member of the Congress of Deputies
- In office 16 May 2019 – 4 May 2021
- Constituency: Barcelona
- In office 2 December 2011 – 25 October 2015
- Constituency: Barcelona

Member of the Senate of Spain
- In office 21 December 2006 – 8 February 2011
- Preceded by: Jaume Bosch
- Succeeded by: Joan Saura
- Constituency: Catalonia

Third Secretary of the Parliament of Catalonia
- In office 26 October 2015 – 28 October 2017
- Preceded by: Josep Rull
- Succeeded by: Joan García González

Member of the Parliament of Catalonia
- In office 26 October 2015 – 20 March 2019
- Succeeded by: Marc Parés Franzi
- Constituency: Barcelona

Member of Montcada i Reixac Municipal Council
- In office 1991–2003

Personal details
- Born: Joan Josep Nuet i Pujals; 6 August 1964 (age 62) Reus, Spain
- Party: United and Alternative Left (1998–2019, 2023–present); Communists of Catalonia (since 2014)
- Other political affiliations: Party of the Communists of Catalonia (1986–2014); Sobiranistes (2019–2023)
- Education: University of Barcelona
- Website: nuet.cat

Joan Josep Nuet i Pujals (born 6 August 1964) is a Spanish politician from Catalonia who previously served as Member of the Congress of Deputies of Spain. He was previously a member of the Senate of Spain and the Parliament of Catalonia.

A member of the Party of the Communists of Catalonia since 1986, Nuet became its secretary-general in January 2010. He has been secretary-general of the Communists of Catalonia since its formation in November 2014. He was co-ordinator general of the United and Alternative Left from June 2012 to June 2019.

Nuet was a member of Montcada i Reixac Municipal Council from 1991 to 2003 and served two terms as a deputy mayor. He was an appointed member of the Senate of Spain from December 2006 to February 2011. He was a member of the Congress of Deputies from December 2011 to October 2015 and a member of the Parliament of Catalonia from October 2015 till his resignation in March 2019. He was Third Secretary of the Parliament of Catalonia from October 2015 to October 2017. He was elected to the Congress of Deputies at the April and November 2019 Spanish general election. After a trial on charges of disobedience for his role in the Catalan declaration of independence, he was handed down an eight-month ban from public office and expelled from Congress on 4 May 2021.

== Early life ==
Nuet was born on 6 August 1964 in Reus, Catalonia. He is the son of Joan Nuet i Pallèja, a Republican veteran of the Battle of the Ebro, and Montserrat Pujals. He has a sister, Montserrat.

Nuet left Reus in 1988 to study history in Tarragona, specialising in contemporary history. He lived in Barcelona for a couple of years before settling in Montcada i Reixac with his partner. Nuet has a degree in geography and history from the University of Barcelona.

== Career ==
=== Party of the Communists of Catalonia ===
Nuet joined the Party of the Communists of Catalonia (PCC) in 1986 and served as secretary-general of its youth wing, the Collectives of Young Communists – Communist Youth (CJC-JC). One of his earliest political acts was campaigning against Spain joining NATO in the 1986 referendum. He was a member of Montcada i Reixac Municipal Council from 1991 to 2003 and was deputy mayor from 1991 to 1999. He was a metropolitan councillor for the Metropolitan Area of Barcelona (AMB) from 1992 to 1999.

Nuet was one of the founders of the United and Alternative Left (EUiA), the Catalan wing of the United Left (IU), in 1998 and was a member of its national commission and the national council. At the 1999 regional election he was placed 36th on the EUiA electoral alliance's list of candidates in the Province of Barcelona but the alliance failed to win any seats in the province and as a result he failed to get elected.

Nuet took part in the negotiations that led to the 2002 electoral agreement between EUiA and Initiative for Catalonia Greens (ICV). At the 2004 general election he was placed third on the Initiative for Catalonia Greens–United and Alternative Left (ICV–EUiA) electoral alliance's list of candidates in the Province of Barcelona but the alliance only managed to win two seats in the province and as a result he failed to get elected. At the IU's 8th Assembly in December 2004 Nuet was elected to the IU's federal political council, federal executive presidency and federal permanent commission.

In December 2006 Nuet was appointed to the Senate of Spain by the Parliament of Catalonia, replacing Jaume Bosch. At the 2008 general election Nuet was placed third on the ICV–EUiA electoral alliance's list of candidates in the Province of Barcelona but the alliance only managed to win one seat in the province and as a result he failed to get elected. He was re-appointed to the Senate in March 2008.

At the IU's 9th Assembly in November 2008 Nuet headed the Nacional II list of candidates in the election of the IU's federal political council (CPF) which came in third, behind the lists headed by Cayo Lara and Inés Sabanés, after receiving 144 of the 761 votes (19%), translating into 17 out of 90 seats on the CPF. As none of the lists obtained more than 50% of the votes the 90 elected members of the CPF postponed electing a General Co-ordinator (leader) until the remaining 90 members of the CPF were appointed by the IU's various federations. At the meeting of the CPF on 14 December 2008 Nuet came second in the election for General Co-ordinator after receiving 29 of the 167 votes (17%), trailing behind Lara who received 92 votes. Nuet became the CPF member with responsibility for internal co-ordination and he was also a member of the IU's federal executive committee.

Nuet was the only Spanish politician on board the Spirit of Humanity, the Free Gaza Movement ship that tried unsuccessfully to take humanitarian aid to Gaza in January 2009 following the Israeli invasion.

=== Communists of Catalonia ===
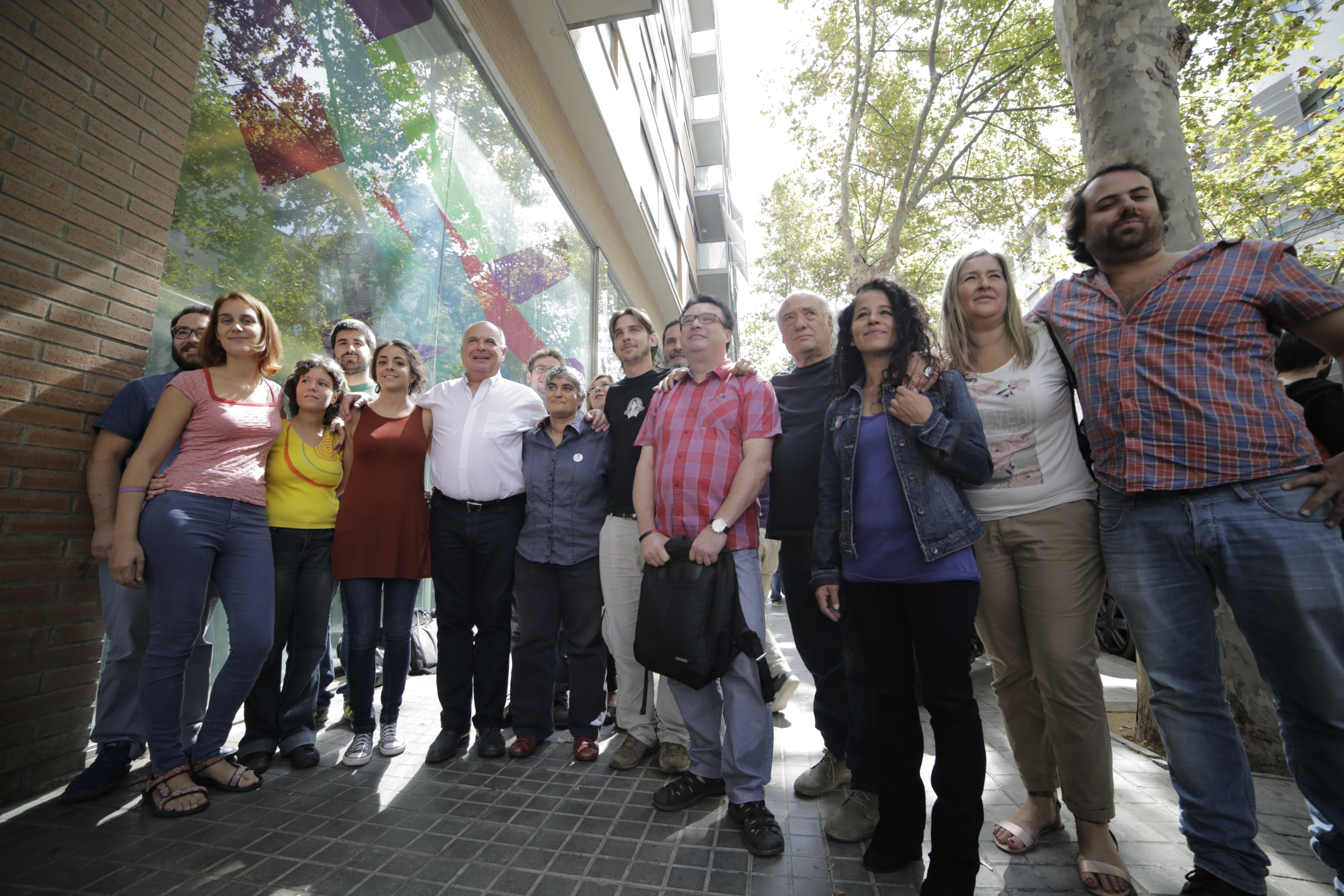
Nuet at the Catalunya Sí que es Pot's headquarters on 8 September 2015

At the PCC's 12th Congress in Cotxeres de Sants in January 2010 Nuet was elected secretary-general unanimously. In February 2011 ICV–EUiA nominated Joan Saura, despite the objections of EUiA, to be its representative in the Senate resulting in Nuet losing his seat. Nuet contested the 2011 general election as a Plural Left electoral alliance candidate in the Province of Barcelona and was elected to the Congress of Deputies. He was elected the EUiA's co-ordinator general in June 2012 after receiving 114 of the 134 votes (85%) of the alliance's national council. In November 2014, at the Congress of Communist Unity held at the La Farga in L'Hospitalet de Llobregat, Nuet was elected secretary-general of the newly formed Communists of Catalonia.

Nuet contested the 2015 regional election as a Catalunya Sí que es Pot electoral alliance candidate in the Province of Barcelona and was elected to the Parliament of Catalonia. He was elected to the Board of the Parliament of Catalonia as Third Secretary on 26 October 2015. Nuet was elected a member to the executive committee of Un País en Comú (Catalunya en Comú) at its founding assembly in Vall d'Hebron April 2017.

=== Catalan independence crisis ===
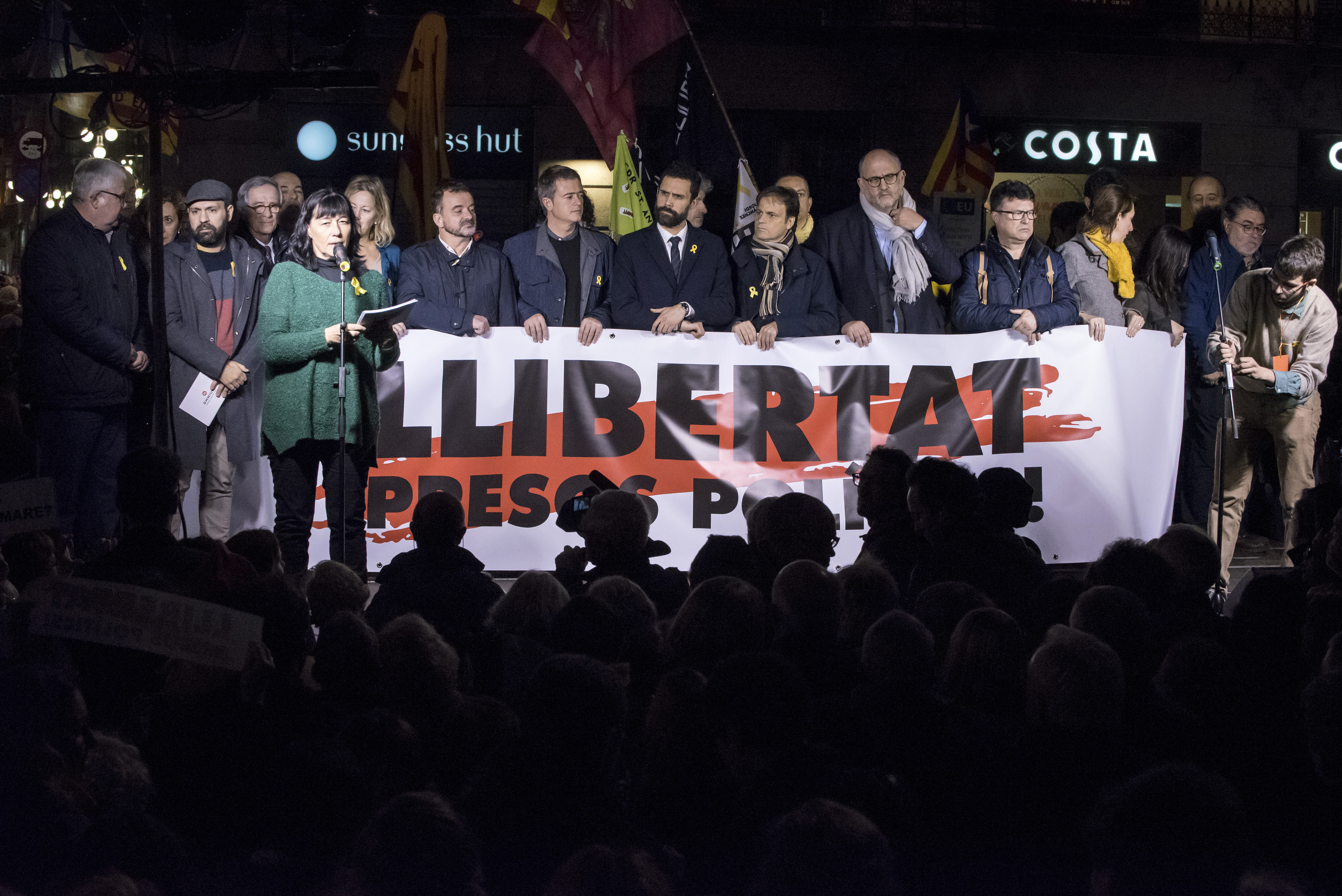
Nuet at the Il·lumina la llibertat rally on 16 February 2018 in Barcelona

In June 2017 President of Catalonia Carles Puigdemont announced that a referendum on Catalan independence would be held on 1 October 2017. The Catalan Parliament passed legislation on 6 September 2017 authorising the referendum which would be binding and based on a simple majority without a minimum threshold. The following day Constitutional Court of Spain suspended the legislation, blocking the referendum. The Spanish government put into effect Operation Anubis in order to disrupt the organisation of the referendum and arrested Catalan government officials. Despite this the referendum went ahead though it was boycotted by unionists and turnout was only 43%. 92% of those who voted supported independence. Around 900 people were injured as the Spanish police used violence to try to prevent voting in the referendum.

On 27 October 2017 the Catalan Parliament declared independence in a vote boycotted by opposition MPs. Almost immediately the Senate of Spain invoked article 155 of the constitution, dismissing Puigdemont and the Catalan government and imposing direct rule on Catalonia. The following day Spanish Prime Minister Mariano Rajoy dissolved the Catalan Parliament and called for fresh regional elections on 21 December 2017.

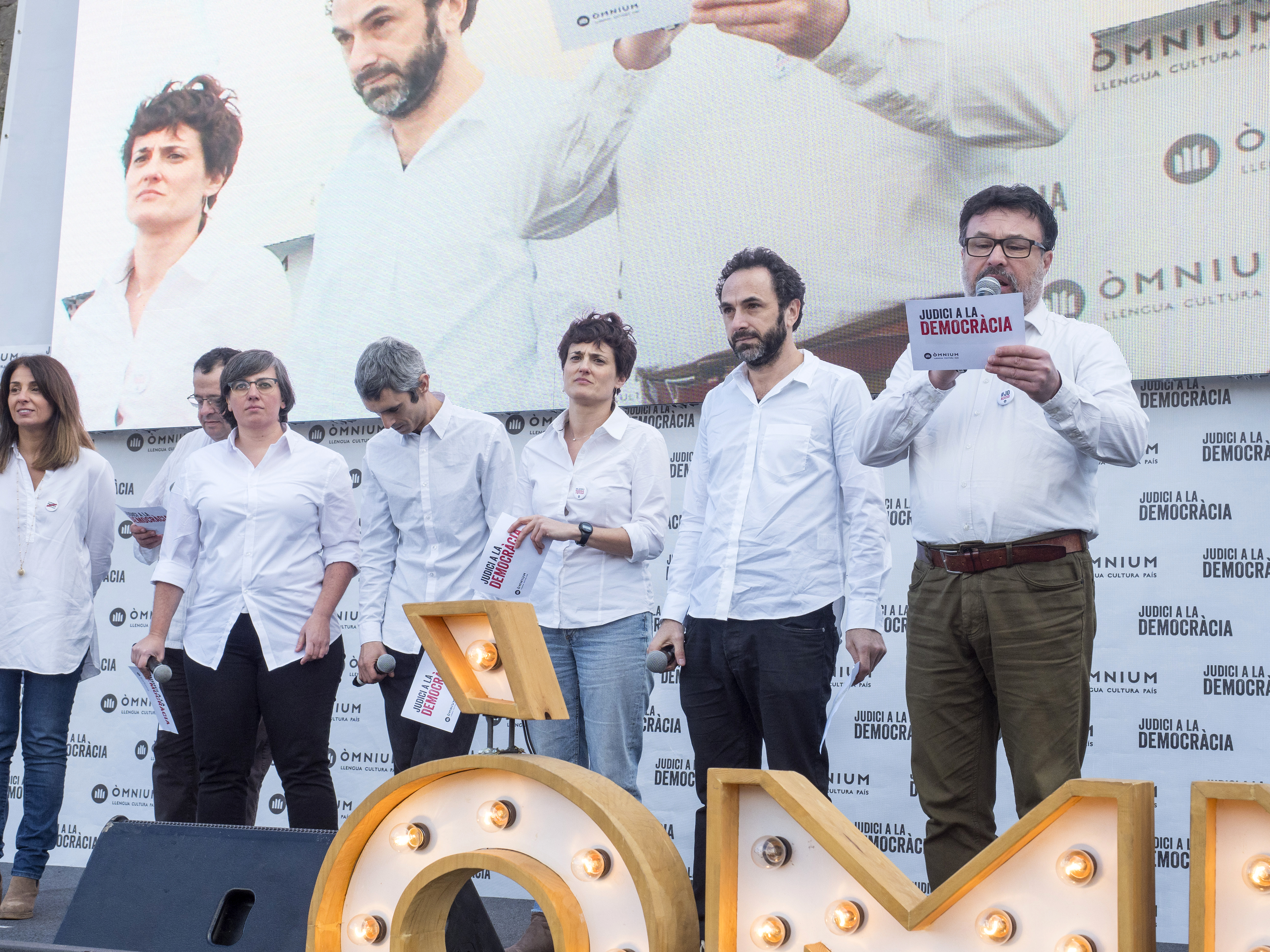
Nuet addresses the Òmnium Cultural's Judici a la Democràcia rally on 19 January 2019 at Montjuïc Castle

On 30 October 2017 Spanish Attorney General José Manuel Maza laid charges of rebellion, sedition and misuse of public funds at the Supreme Court against Nuet and five other members of the Board of the Parliament of Catalonia (Ramona Barrufet, Lluís Corominas, Carme Forcadell, Lluís Guinó and Anna Simó). The charges carried maximum sentences of 30, 15 and 6 years in prison respectively.

Nuet and the other members of the board appeared before Supreme Court judge Pablo Llarena on 9 November 2017. Nuet was released without any precautionary measures but the other five had to pay bail (€100,000 for Forcadell, €25,000 each for Barrufet, Corominas, Guinó and Simó), surrender their passport and present themselves at a court weekly. The bail bonds were paid by the Catalan National Assembly.

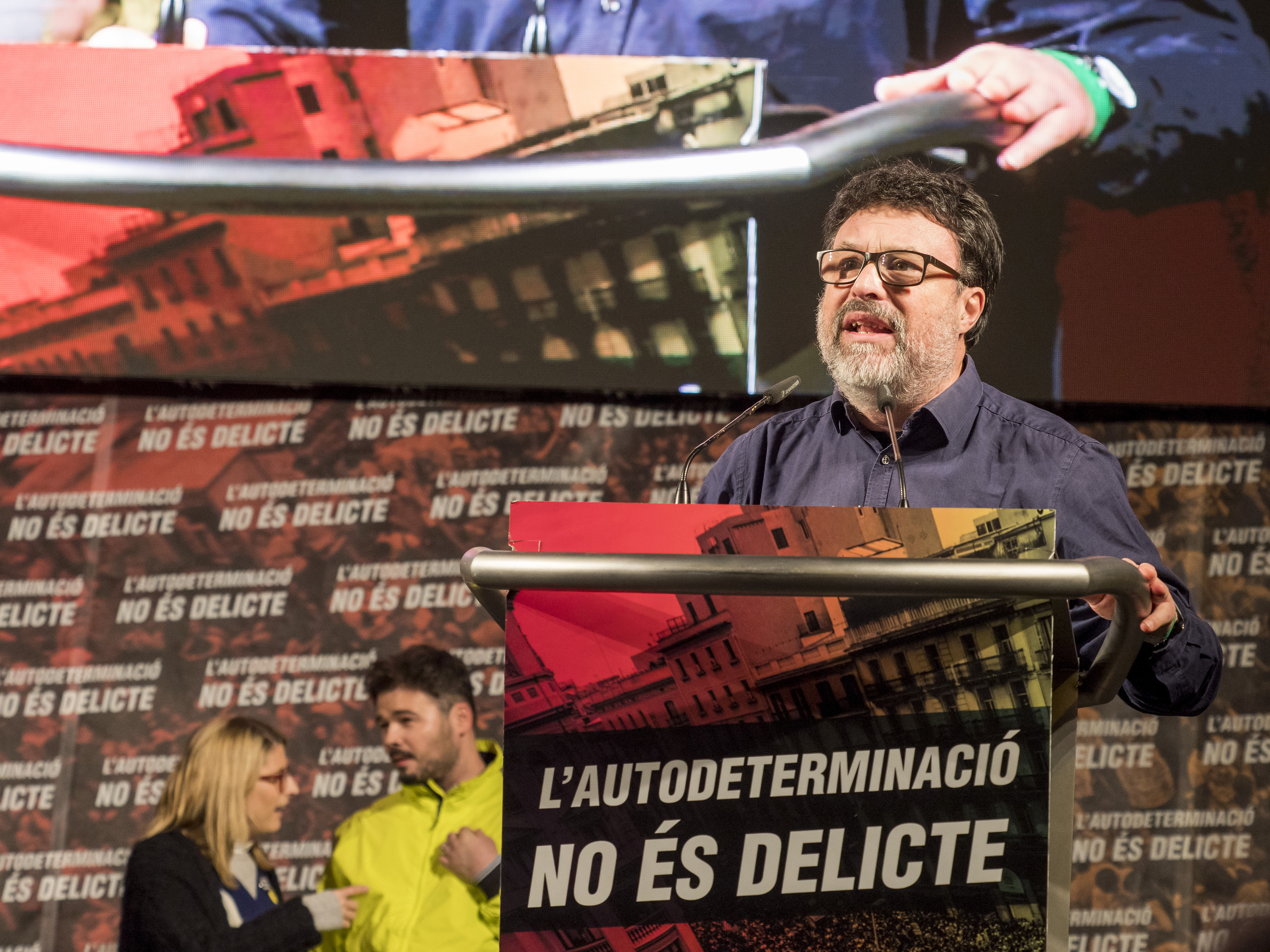
Nuet addresses the L'autodeterminació no és delicte rally on 16 February 2019 in Barcelona

After a four-month judicial investigation into the referendum and declaration of independence Supreme Court judge Pablo Llarena issued a 70-page ruling on 23 March 2018 in which he ordered that 25 of the 28 Catalan politicians and activists under investigation be tried for rebellion, embezzlement or disobedience. Nuet was charged with disobeying an order of the Constitutional Court (article 410 of the criminal code).

A pre-trial hearing commenced on 18 December 2018 at the Supreme Court at which defence lawyers argued that the court was not competent to hear charges of rebellion or disobedience and that it should be heard at the High Court of Justice of Catalonia. On 27 December 2018 the Supreme Court ruled that, although they were competent to hear all the charges, the six defendants charged only with disobedience (Barrufet, Mireia Boya, Corominas, Guinó, Nuet and Simó) would be tried at the High Court of Justice of Catalonia.

=== Sobiranistes ===
Nuet was re-elected at the 2017 regional election. In October 2018 Nuet, Elisenda Alamany and others critical of the Catalunya en Comú leadership's lack of support for Catalan sovereigntism formed the Sobiranistes platform. In March 2019 Communists of Catalonia voted to include Nuet on the secessionist Republican Left of Catalonia's (ERC) list of candidates for the 2019 general election. As a result, he was expelled from the Catalunya en Comú parliamentary group. On 18 March 2019 Nuet announced that he was resigning from the Parliament of Catalonia, leaving Catalunya en Comú and that he and the Sobiranistes would align themselves with ERC.

Nuet contested the 2019 general election as a Republican Left of Catalonia–Sovereigntists electoral alliance candidate in the Province of Barcelona and was re-elected to the Congress of Deputies. Nuet's decision to contest the general election in alliance with the ERC also led to criticism within EUiA and in June 2019 he announced he was leaving the EUiA.

== Personal life ==
Nuet is married and has a son.

== Electoral history ==
Electoral history of Joan Josep Nuet
Election	Constituency	Party	Alliance	No.	Result
1991 local	Montcada i Reixac	Party of the Communists of Catalonia	Left Proposal for Catalonia		Elected
1995 local	Montcada i Reixac	Party of the Communists of Catalonia	Initiative for Catalonia-The Greens		Elected
1999 local	Montcada i Reixac	Party of the Communists of Catalonia	Initiative for Catalonia-The Greens- Alternative Left Municipal Progress	2	Elected
1999 regional	Province of Barcelona	Party of the Communists of Catalonia	United and Alternative Left	36	Not elected
2004 general	Province of Barcelona	Party of the Communists of Catalonia	Initiative for Catalonia Greens–United and Alternative Left	3	Not elected
2008 general	Province of Barcelona	Party of the Communists of Catalonia	Initiative for Catalonia Greens–United and Alternative Left	3	Not elected
2011 general	Province of Barcelona	Party of the Communists of Catalonia	Initiative for Catalonia Greens–United and Alternative Left: Plural Left	3	Elected
2015 regional	Province of Barcelona	Communists of Catalonia	Catalunya Sí que es Pot	6	Elected
2017 regional	Province of Barcelona	Communists of Catalonia	Catalunya en Comú–Podem	5	Elected
2019 general	Province of Barcelona	Communists of Catalonia	Republican Left of Catalonia–Sovereigntists	4	Elected
