= Republican Left of Catalonia–Sovereigntists =

Catalan electoral coalition

Republican Left of Catalonia–Sovereigntists Esquerra Republicana de Catalunya–Sobiranistes
- Abbreviation: ERC–Sobiranistes
- Leader: Oriol Junqueras
- Founded: 14 March 2019
- Dissolved: 2023
- Preceded by: Republican Left of Catalonia–Catalonia Yes
- Headquarters: C/ Calàbria, 166; 08015, Barcelona
- Ideology: Catalan independence Republicanism; Social democracy Democratic socialism
- Political position: Centre-left to left-wing
- Members: See list of members

Website
- www.esquerra.cat

Republican Left of Catalonia–Sovereigntists (Catalan: Esquerra Republicana de Catalunya–Sobiranistes, ERC–Sobiranistes) was an electoral coalition formed in Catalonia for the April 2019 Spanish general election by Republican Left of Catalonia (ERC) and Sovereigntists (Sobiranistes). It was led by Oriol Junqueras, Gabriel Rufián and Carolina Telechea, with a member from Sobiranistes (Joan Josep Nuet) being reserved 4th place in the list for Barcelona.

The alliance was maintained for the November 2019 general election.

== History ==
Following the split of the Sobiranistes faction within Catalunya en Comú in February 2019 by deputies Elisenda Alamany and Joan Josep Nuet, ERC entered in coalition talks with the new party ahead of the April 2019 Spanish general election. An alliance was formalized in March, with the agreement providing for Sobiranistes to field candidates within ERC's list for Barcelona. The alliance was maintained for the November 2019 general election.

The alliance was extended to the 2019 Barcelona City Council election in support of Ernest Maragall's bid to the mayorship of Barcelona.

== Composition ==
Party	Notes
Republican Left of Catalonia (ERC)	
Sovereigntists (Sobiranistes)	
United and Alternative Left (EUiA)	Informally since July 2019. (Note: EUiA leader Joan Josep Nuet split away from Catalunya en Comú in March 2019 within the Sobiranistes party to sign an electoral alliance with ERC, without resigning or giving away his responsibilities in EUiA. IU's coordinator Alberto Garzón expelled EUiA from the federation in July 2019 and founded a new regional branch with Nuet's critics, as Nuet kept control over the remainder of EUiA.)

== Electoral performance ==
=== Cortes Generales ===
Cortes Generales
Election	Leading candidate	Congress			Senate			Gov.
Election	Leading candidate	Votes	%	Seats	Votes	%	Seats	Gov.
Apr. 2019	Oriol Junqueras (Note: At the time of the election, Junqueras was in preventive detention in Soto del Real (Madrid).)	1,020,392	3.9 (#6)	15 / 350	3,144,383	4.4 (#6)	11 / 208	—
Nov. 2019	Gabriel Rufián	874,859	3.6 (#6)	13 / 350	3,040,779	4.8 (#6)	11 / 208	(Note: Confidence and supply.)
