= Carolina Telechea =

Spanish politician (born 1981)

Member of the Congress of Deputies of Spain
- Incumbent
- Assumed office 12 June 2018
- Preceded by: Ester Capella
- Constituency: Barcelona

Member of Igualada Municipal Council
- In office 2015–2019

Personal details
- Born: Carolina Telechea i Lozano; 9 August 1981 (age 45) Igualada, Catalonia, Spain
- Party: Republican Left of Catalonia
- Other political affiliations: Republican Left of Catalonia–Sovereigntists
- Education: University of Barcelona
- Occupation: Lawyer
- Website: carolinatelecheaadvocada.com

Carolina Telechea i Lozano (born 9 August 1981) is a Catalan lawyer and politician from Spain. She is a member of the Congress of Deputies of Spain.

== Early life and family ==
Telechea was born on 9 August 1981 in Igualada, (Note: Another source gives Telechea's place of birth as Barcelona.) Catalonia. She has a diverse family background - Andalusian, Argentine, Basque and Extremaduran. Her father was from Madrid while her mother was from Cáceres. Both parents worked in the textile industry and in the 1990s her father founded a computer company. She has two younger sisters who are twins. Telechea has a degree in law from the University of Barcelona and a postgraduate degree in legal practice from the Barcelona Bar Association.

Telechea's family were socialists and supporters of federalism. Her father was a Socialists' Party of Catalonia (PSC) councillor in Santa Margarida de Montbui in the 1980s. Telechea was a member of the PSC for six years and was secretary of the Anoia branch of the Socialist Youth of Catalonia (JSC). However, the failure of the socialists to prioritise federalism led to Telechea leaving the PSC in 2010.

== Career ==
Telechea has been a practicing lawyer since 2006, specialising in criminal law. Whilst working as a co-ordinator for the socialist mayor of Santa Margarida de Montbui she was dismissed when she became pregnant. She sued and with the compensation she won she formed her own law firm in 2011.

In 2015 Telechea was approached by the nationalist Republican Left of Catalonia (ERC) to contest the local elections. She contested the 2015 local elections as a Republican Left of Catalonia–Acord Municipal (ERC-AM) electoral alliance candidate in Igualada and was elected.

At the 2016 general election Telechea was placed sixth on the Republican Left of Catalonia–Catalonia Yes (ERC–CatSí) electoral alliance's list of candidates in the Province of Barcelona but the alliance only managed to win five seats in the province and as a result she failed to get elected. However, in June 2018, she was appointed to the Congress of Deputies following the resignation of Ester Capella. She was re-elected at the April 2019 and November 2019 general elections.

== Personal life ==
Telechea is married to a Mossos d'Esquadra police officer and has a son, Jules.

== Electoral history ==
Electoral history of Carolina Telechea
Election	Constituency	Party	Alliance	No.	Result
2015 local	Igualada	Republican Left of Catalonia	Republican Left of Catalonia–Acord Municipal	2	Elected
2016 general	Province of Barcelona	Republican Left of Catalonia	Republican Left of Catalonia–Catalonia Yes	6	Not elected
2019 April general	Province of Barcelona	Republican Left of Catalonia	Republican Left of Catalonia–Sovereigntists	3	Elected
2019 November general	Province of Barcelona	Republican Left of Catalonia	Republican Left of Catalonia–Sovereigntists	2	Elected
