= Sovereigntism (disambiguation) =

Sovereigntism, Sovereigntist or sovereignism may refer to:

- American exceptionalism, referred to as "New Sovereigntism" by Peter J. Spiro in a 2000 essay in the journal Foreign Affairs.
- Quebec sovereignty movement
- Sobiranistes, (English: "Sovereigntists"), a political party of the republican and Catalan sovereigntist left.
- Sovereign citizen movement, a movement which asserts an unproven legal theory that courts and government authorities have no actual jurisdiction over people.
- Sovereigntism, or "Souverainism", a doctrine which supports acquiring or preserving political independence of a nation or a region
- Sovereigntism (Puerto Rico), a political faction in Puerto Rico that advocates for a freely associate state with the United States
