= Sobiranistes =

Sovereigntists Sobiranistes
- Founder: Joan Josep Nuet; Elisenda Alamany
- Founded: 23 October 2018 (platform); 21 February 2019 (party)
- Dissolved: May 2023
- Split from: Catalunya en Comú
- Headquarters: C/ Eterna Memoria, 2, 3º-2ª 08026, Barcelona
- Ideology: Souverainism; Catalan nationalism Republicanism; Democratic socialism
- Political position: Left-wing
- Regional affiliation: Republican Left of Catalonia–Sovereigntists (2019–2023)
- Slogan: Un nou futur en comú ("A new future in common")

Website
- www.sobiranistes.net

Sobiranistes (English: "Sovereigntists") was a political party of the republican and Catalan sovereigntist left, formed by a splinter group from Catalunya en Comú (CatComú) led by Joan Josep Nuet and Elisenda Alamany, deputies in the Parliament of Catalonia.

== History ==
Sobiranistes was initially constituted on 23 October 2018 as a political platform the Catalunya en Comú–Podem group in the Parliament of Catalonia by deputies Elisenda Alamany and Joan Josep Nuet, under the Som comuns, som sobiranistes (We are common, we are sovereigntist) motto. The goal of the platform was to "right" the course of the perceived drift of CatComú towards "the vices of traditional parties", were very critical of the role of Initiative for Catalonia Greens (ICV) within the party, and accused CatComú's leader Ada Colau of having "abandoned sovereigntism" and of "disbanding Xavier Domènech's team", after the latter's resigned as Podemos regional secretary-general and Catalan deputy. CatComú's leadership would criticize Alamany for "poor transparency" as well as the platform's establishment not being done according to internal party procedures.

Sobiranistes was formally registered as a party on 21 February 2019, with Alamany and Nuet breaking up from Catalunya en Comú, and subsequently entering coalition talks with Republican Left of Catalonia (ERC) ahead of the April 2019 Spanish general election. Such alliance was formalized in March under the Republican Left of Catalonia–Sovereigntists label, with the agreement providing for Sobiranistes to field candidates within ERC's list for Barcelona. The alliance was maintained for the November 2019 general election. Alamany also registered the Nova–New Future (Catalan: Nova–Nou Futur) political party on 11 March, reaching an agreement with ERC to support Ernest Maragall's run to the mayorship of Barcelona in the 2019 municipal election.

During the COVID-19 pandemic, Sobiranistes broke ERC's group discipline in several occasions by abstaining—rather than opposing—in the votings for the proroguing of the state of alarm.

The party ceased all its political activity in May 2023.

== Electoral performance ==
=== Cortes Generales ===
Cortes Generales
Election	Congress					Senate		Leading candidate	Status in legislature
Election	Votes	%	#	Seats	+/–	Seats	+/–	Leading candidate	Status in legislature
2019 (Apr)	Within ERC–Sob.			1 / 350	1	0 / 208	0	Oriol Junqueras (Note: At the time of the election, Junqueras was in preventive detention in Soto del Real (Madrid).)	New election
2019 (Nov)	Within ERC–Sob.			1 / 350	0	0 / 208	0	Gabriel Rufián	Opposition
