= Communist Youth of Catalonia =

Communist Youth of Catalonia Joventut Comunista de Catalunya
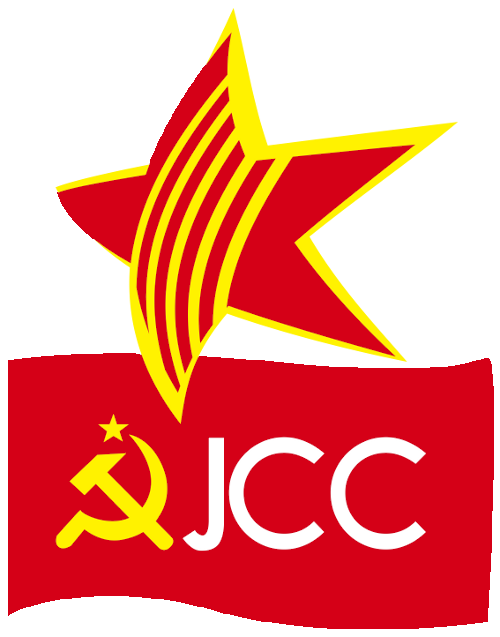
- President: Collective leadership (Central Committee)
- Secretary-General: Dana Sánchez Oussedik
- Founded: 1970; 2014 (refoundation)
- Headquarters: Barcelona
- Ideology: Communism; Marxism-Leninism; Catalan nationalism Republicanism
- Regional affiliation: Communists of Catalonia (since 2014); Unified Socialist Party of Catalonia (1970–1992)
- International affiliation: WFDY
- Colours: Red, purple

Website
- www.jcc.cat

Logo of Joventut Comunista de Catalunya

JCC sticker

Communist Youth of Catalonia (in Catalan: Joventut Comunista de Catalunya) was the youth wing of the Unified Socialist Party of Catalonia (PSUC) and the current youth wing of the Communists of Catalonia. JCC was formed as a clandestine organization in 1970. The founding general secretary was Domenech Martínez. In 1971 JCC took part in the foundation of the Permanent Commission of the Assembly of Catalonia (Comissió Permanent de l' Assemblea de Catalunya).

The central organ of JCC was Jove Guàrdia and later "Jovent". In Barcelona JCC published Juventud and in Tarragona it published Demà. Currently, the JCC publish Maig.

JCC later dissolved into JambI. In 2014, it was refunded as the fusion of the youth wings of the Party of the Communists of Catalonia (PCC) and the PSUC viu.
