= Communists of Catalonia =

Communists of Catalonia Comunistes de Catalunya
- President: Collective leadership (Central Committee)
- Secretary-General: Hector Sánchez Mira
- Founded: November 2014
- Preceded by: Party of the Communists of Catalonia
- Headquarters: Barcelona
- Youth wing: Communist Youth of Catalonia
- Ideology: Communism; Marxism-Leninism; Catalan self-determination Republicanism
- Political position: Far-left
- Regional affiliation: United and Alternative Left (since 2014)
- International affiliation: IMCWP
- Colours: Red
- Congress of Deputies (Catalan seats): 0 / 47
- Parliament of Catalonia: 0 / 135

Website
- www.comunistes.cat

Communists of Catalonia (Catalan: Comunistes de Catalunya) is a Marxist-Leninist party in Catalonia founded in 2014.

Communists of Catalonia was founded on November 1, 2014, through the merger of the Party of the Communists of Catalonia (PCC) and independent communist sympathizers. Joan Josep Nuet was elected as Secretary General of the new organization. Like the founding parties, the new party participates in the coalition Esquerra Unida i Alternativa.
