= Elisenda Alamany =

Spanish teacher and politician

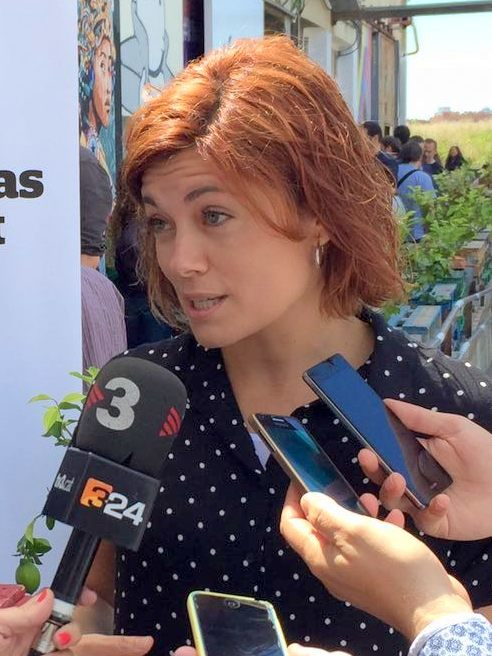

Secretary-General of Republican Left of Catalonia
- Incumbent
- Assumed office 14 December 2024
- President: Oriol Junqueras
- Preceded by: Marta Rovira

City Councilor of Barcelona
- Incumbent
- Assumed office 15 June 2019

Member of the Parliament of Catalonia
- In office 17 January 2018 – 2 April 2019
- Constituency: Barcelona

Personal details
- Born: Elisenda Alamany i Gutiérrez; 1983 (age 42–43) Sabadell, Spain
- Party: Republican Left of Catalonia (since 2023)
- Other political affiliations: Nova (2019–2023); Sobiranistes (2019); Catalunya en Comú (2017–2019)
- Education: University of Barcelona
- Occupation: Teacher, politician

Elisenda Alamany i Gutiérrez (Catalan pronunciation: [əliˈzendə ələˈmaɲ]; born 1983) is a Catalan teacher and politician. She serves as a member of the City Council of Barcelona since June 2019 and as Secretary-General of Republican Left of Catalonia since December 2024.

From January 2018 to April 2019 she was a deputy in the 12th Legislature of the Parliament of Catalonia. Initially part of the coalition Catalunya en Comú–Podem, she was the spokesperson for its parliamentary group from 18 January to 29 October 2018. In October 2018, she promoted the platform Sobiranistes (Sovereigntists) as a criticism of the leadership of En Comú Podem. In February 2019 she left the parliamentary group but kept her seat. On 24 February 2019, she announced the creation of the party Nova–New Future (Catalan: Nova–Nou Futur).

== Biography ==
Elisenda Alamany holds a licentiate in Catalan philology and has worked as a secondary education teacher. She specialized in management of linguistic and cultural diversity at the Open University of Catalonia in 2012, and has taught Catalan to foreigners at Pompeu Fabra University, as well as teaching adults at Òmnium Cultural and the Consortium for Linguistic Normalization.

Her political career is rooted in municipalism. In 2007, together with Gemma Ubasart and a group of residents of Castellar del Vallès, she founded the candidacy L'Altraveu per Castellar as an independent grouping of electors not affiliated with any political party. In the 2007 elections for Castellar del Vallés they obtained two councilors, who were revalidated in the 2011 elections.

In the 2015 elections for Castellar del Vallés, the Decidim Castellar candidacy – an alliance of L'Altraveu, Procés Constituent, United and Alternative Left, and Podemos – yielded four councilors.

Alamany won a seat as deputy of the Parliament of Catalonia in the 2017 regional election, where she was number 2 for the district of Barcelona for the electoral coalition Catalunya en Comú–Podem. She was the spokesperson for its parliamentary group from 18 January to 29 October 2018.

Identified with the Catalan independence movement, following the resignation of Xavier Domènech on 22 October 2018, she was a promoter of the manifesto Som Comuns. Som Sobiranistes and the platform Sobiranistes as a criticism of the direction of En Comú Podem. Together with Joan Josep Nuet, she denounced Catalunya en Comú–Podem for abandoning the issue of sovereignty, which had been one of its original values. On 29 October Alamany stepped down as spokesperson for the "Comuns" in Parliament.

On 19 February 2019 Alamany left the En Comú Podem parliamentary group, maintaining her seat in Parliament and announcing that she would dedicate herself to Sobiranistes, transforming it into a new party. On 24 February 2019, the new party's name was announced: Nova–New Future (Catalan: Nova–Nou Futur).

In March 2019 it was reported that Sobiranistes was negotiating a coalition with the Republican Left of Catalonia for the Congress and City Council of Barcelona, and that Elisenda Alamany would be number 2 on the City Council list headed by Ernest Maragall.

== Publications ==
- Construint municipi des dels moviments socials (2010), co-edited with Gemma Ubasart and Marc Serrà, Editorial Icaria, ISBN 9788498882759
- La centralitat, en joc: conversa amb cinc veus representatives de partits polítics sobre la recerca de l'hegemonia a Catalunya (2018), with Marta Vilalta i Torres, Ferran Pedret i Santos, Marta Rovira, Arturo Mas, and Sonia Sierra, Lleida Pagès Editors, ISBN 9788499759555
