= Jaume Bosch (politician) =

Spanish politician

Jaume Bosch i Mestres or Jaume Bosch (born 1953) is a Spanish politician from Catalonia. He earned a law degree from the University of Barcelona where he later taught. He was an aide to the mayor of Sant Feliu de Llobregat from 1991 to 1999. He later served as deputy and senator in the Cortes Generales.
