= Gabriel Rufián =

Catalan politician (born 1982)

Gabriel Rufián MP
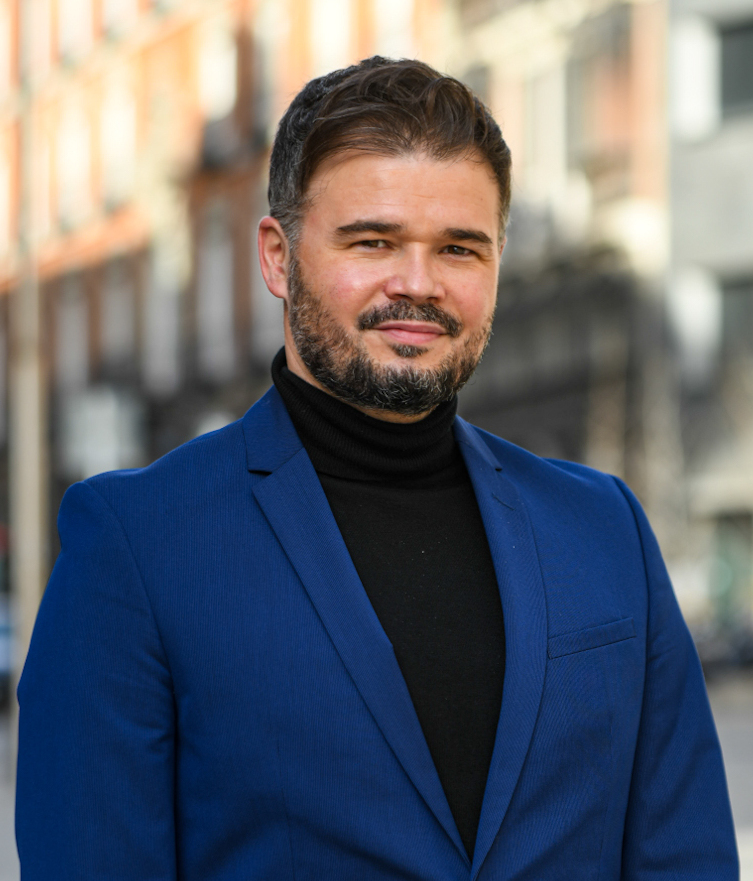
- Gabriel Rufián in 2022

Spokesperson of the Republican Left Group in the Congress of Deputies
- Incumbent
- Assumed office 11 June 2019
- Preceded by: Joan Tardà

Member of the Congress of Deputies
- Incumbent
- Assumed office 13 January 2016
- Constituency: Barcelona

Member of the Santa Coloma de Gramenet City Council
- In office 17 June 2023 – 17 January 2025

Personal details
- Born: Gabriel Rufián Romero; 8 February 1982 (age 44) Santa Coloma de Gramenet, Catalonia, Spain
- Party: Republican Left of Catalonia
- Education: Pompeu Fabra University

Gabriel Rufián Romero (born 8 February 1982) is a Spanish politician. In the Spanish general election of 2015 he led the Republican Left of Catalonia (ERC), a pro-independence electoral party. He is also a member of the secretariat of the Assemblea Nacional Catalana and a member of Súmate, two other pro-independence groups.

In the 2016 general election, he was elected to the Spanish Cortes Generales for the constituency of Barcelona. On 20 September 2017, in support of the Catalan referendum on independence on 1 October, he told Prime Minister Mariano Rajoy to "take his dirty hands off Catalan institutions," after the Judiciary of Spain arrested several Catalan politicians as part of Operation Anubis. Later, he and several other Catalan politicians walked out of the parliament in protest. In September 2018, Rufián was part of a one-hour question time directed towards the former premier José María Aznar.

In the 2023 Spanish general election, Rufián again led the Republican Left of Catalonia as the ERC's leading candidate. The 2023 election saw a significant defeat for the ERC, losing 6 of the party's 13 seats in the Congress of Deputies. Rufián hailed the election results, declaring "If they want to govern their country, they will have to respect ours", referencing the potential kingmaker role, which pro-independence parties held after the contentious election.
