= Republican Left of Catalonia =

Republican Left of Catalonia Esquerra Republicana de Catalunya
- Abbreviation: ERC
- President: Oriol Junqueras
- Secretary-General: Elisenda Alamany
- Founders: Francesc Macià; Lluís Companys; Joan Lluhí
- Founded: 19 March 1931; 95 years ago
- Merger of: Estat Català; Catalan Republican Party; L'Opinió
- Headquarters: C/Calàbria, 166; 08015 Barcelona, Catalonia, Spain
- Youth wing: Republican Youth
- Membership (2024): ▼8,335
- Ideology: Catalan independence; Eco-nationalism; Left-wing nationalism; Republicanism; Democratic socialism; Social democracy; Regionalism; Faction: Federalism
- Political position: Centre-left to left-wing
- National affiliation: Ahora Repúblicas (since 2019) (Note: The party was formerly part of the Left Front (1936–1939), Coalition for the Europe of the Peoples (1987–1989), For the Europe of the Peoples (1989–1994), For the Europe of the Peoples (1994–1999), CN-EP (1999–2004), Europe of the Peoples (2004–2009), EdP-V (2009–2014) and EPDD (2014–2019)); Left for Independence (since 2023)
- European affiliation: European Free Alliance
- European Parliament group: Greens–European Free Alliance
- International affiliation: Régions et Peuples Solidaires
- Colours: Orange and beige (official, since 2025); Yellow (customary)
- Congress of Deputies (Catalan seats): 7 / 47
- Spanish Senate (Catalan seats): 4 / 24
- European Parliament (Spanish seats): 1 / 61
- Parliament of Catalonia: 20 / 135
- Parliament of the Balearic Islands: 0 / 59
- Mayors in Catalonia: 329 / 947
- Town councillors in Catalonia: 2,898 / 9,077
- Town councillors in the Balearic Islands: 16 / 925

Website
- esquerra.cat

The Republican Left of Catalonia (Catalan: Esquerra Republicana de Catalunya [əsˈkɛrə rəpubːliˈkanə ðə kətəˈluɲə], ERC; generically branded as Esquerra Republicana), also known as the Republican Party of Catalonia, is a pro-Catalan independence, social democratic political party in the Spanish autonomous community of Catalonia, with a presence also in Valencia, the Balearic Islands and the French department of Pyrénées-Orientales (Northern Catalonia). It is also the main sponsor of the movement for independence from France and Spain in the territories known as Catalan Countries, focusing in recent years on the creation of a Catalan Republic in Catalonia-proper.

ERC members sit in the unicameral Catalan Parliament, which exercises devolved powers within Spain. The party also contests and wins elections for seats in both houses of the Spanish Cortes Generales (the national parliament), as well as the European Parliament, where it sits as a member of the European Free Alliance. In 2022, ERC had 9,047 members. It is headquartered in Barcelona. Currently, its president is Oriol Junqueras and its secretary-general is Elisenda Alamany.

ERC was founded almost 100 years ago, and has counted amongst its leaders Francesc Macià, Lluís Companys and Josep Tarradellas. ERC played an important role in Catalan and Spanish politics during the Second Republic, the Spanish Civil War, as part of the anti-Francoist resistance, and in Spain's transition to democracy. After a difficult period in the 1980s, it recovered a key electoral position during the 2000s, becoming a coalition partner in various Catalan governments. In 2021, an ERC member won the presidency of Catalonia for the first time since 1980, with the appointment of lawyer Pere Aragonès as President of the Generalitat de Catalunya (President of the Catalan Government).

== History ==
=== Republic and first Catalan self-government (1931–1936) ===
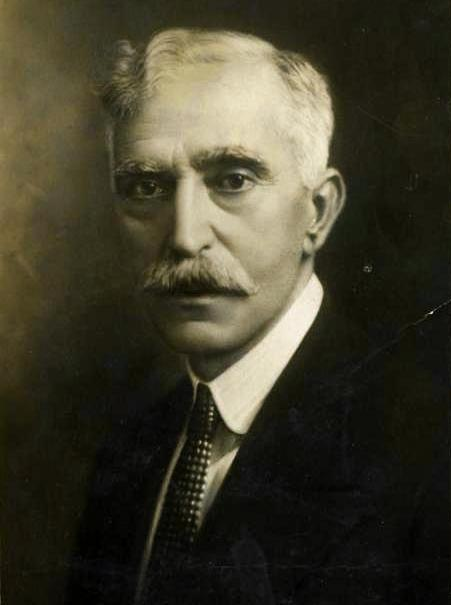
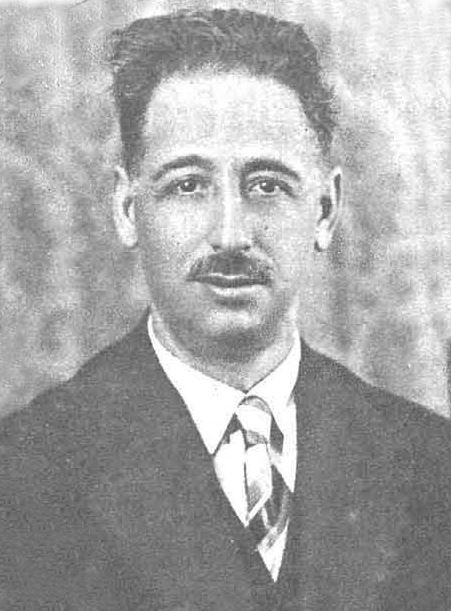
Left: Francesc Macià. Right: Lluís Companys.

After the fall of Primo de Rivera (1930), the Catalan left made great efforts to create a united front under the leadership of left-wing independentist leader Francesc Macià. The Republican Left of Catalonia was founded at the Conference of the Catalan Left (held in Sants, Barcelona, on 19 March 1931) as the union of the independentist Estat Català (Catalan State), led by Francesc Macià, the Catalan Republican Party, led by Lluís Companys, and the L'Opinió Group of Joan Lluhí i Vallescà.

The party did extremely well in the municipal elections of 12 April 1931. Two days later, on 14 April, few hours before the proclamation of the Spanish Republic in Madrid, Macià proclaimed in Barcelona the Catalan Republic within the Iberian Federation. This was not exactly what had been agreed in the Pact of San Sebastián, so three days later they negotiated with the Madrid government that Macià would become President of the Generalitat of Catalonia, an autonomous Catalan government within the recently founded Spanish Republic.

In September 1932, the Spanish Republican Cortes approved the Statute of Autonomy of Catalonia which, among other provisions, granted a Catalan Parliament with broad legislative powers, and it was elected on 20 November 1932. The Republican Left of Catalonia, in coalition with the Socialist Union of Catalonia and other minor left-wing parties, won a large majority of seats (67 of 85), while the previously hegemonic Regionalist League, representing a more conservative view of Catalan nationalism, came in second place but far behind ERC (17 from 85). From this strong position, the ERC through the Catalan Government sought to improve living conditions of the popular classes and the petite bourgeoisie, approving laws in areas such as in culture, health, education and civil law. The Catalan Government also progressed the Crop Contracts Law, which sought to protect tenant farmers and grant them access to the land they were cultivating; it was contested by the Regionalist League and provoked a legal dispute with the Spanish government. In October 1933, Joan Lluhí and other members of the l'Opinió Group, as well Josep Tarradellas, withdrew from the ERC due to disagreement with Macià over the distribution of powers between the Executive Council of Catalonia and the President of the Generalitat; they founded the Nationalist Republican Left Party (PNRE).

Francesc Macià died in office in December 1933 and Lluís Companys was elected by the Parliament of Catalonia as the new President of the Generalitat. On 6 October 1934, following the appointment of right-wing members of the Spanish Confederation of the Autonomous Right (CEDA) as ministers in the Government of the Spanish Republic, Companys unlawfully declared a Catalan State "within a Spanish Federal Republic" (which, of course, did not at that time exist). CEDA was considered close to fascism and, therefore, it was feared that the ministers' appointment was a first step toward suppressing the autonomy of Catalonia and taking complete power nationally. The nascent Catalan 'state' was quickly suppressed by the Spanish Army, and members of the Catalan government were arrested. Party leaders (including Companys himself) and Catalan officials were tried by the Supreme Court of the Republic, receiving jail sentences, while the Statute of Autonomy of Catalonia was suspended (until February 1936).

In 1936, at the dawn of the Spanish Civil War, ERC became part of the Popular Front to contest that year's election. Esquerra became the leading force of the Popular Front, (called Front d'Esquerres, "Left Front" in Catalan) in Catalonia, which it won 41 from 54 Catalan seats, 21 of them belonging to ERC. The new left-wing Spanish government pardoned Companys and the members of the Catalan government, restoring the self-government. In June 1936, Estat Català split from ERC, while the PNRE rejoined it.

=== Civil War, Francoism and clandestinity (1936–1976) ===
During the Spanish Civil War, ERC, as the leading force of the Generalitat, tried to maintain the unity of the Front in the face of growing tensions between the Workers' Party of Marxist Unification (POUM) and the pro-Soviet Unified Socialist Party of Catalonia (PSUC), while struggled to recover the control of the situation, de facto controlled by the anarchist trade union CNT and their militias, and attempted to organize the war efforts in Catalonia. President Companys appointed Josep Tarradellas Conseller Primer (Prime Minister) in order to form a coalition government with the other Republican forces, including anarchists and communists. However, the party unsuccessfully tried to avoid the full control of Catalonia by the Republican government, enacted after the May Days event.

The party was declared illegal (along with all other participants in the Popular Front) by Francisco Franco after he came to power in 1939. The former president of the Catalan Generalitat, Lluís Companys, was arrested by Nazi German agents in collaboration with Vichy France, returned to Spain and executed on 15 October 1940 in Montjuïc Castle, Barcelona.

Since 1939, despite the weak situation of the party, almost disbanded after the Francoist occupation of Catalonia, ERC went underground and tried to organize anti-fascist resistance around Manuel Juliachs and Jaume Serra. In 1945, the ERC Congress, held in Toulouse since many ERC members lived in exile in France, appointed former Minister Josep Tarradellas as Secretary General, a position he left in 1954 when he was elected President of the Generalitat of Catalonia in exile, replacing Josep Irla. The office of General Secretary of ERC then passed to Joan Sauret. At the end of World War II, in view of a possible overthrow of Francoist Dictatorship with the intervention of the Allied forces, the direction of ERC in exile sent to Catalonia Pere Puig and Joan Rodríguez-Papasseit. During those years ERC was present at the Council of Catalan Democracy and the Council of Democratic Forces. In 1952, Heribert Barrera returned to the interior and assumes the direction of the party de facto. On 11 September 1964, the National Day of Catalonia, ERC and other groups organized the first anti-Franco demonstration since the end of the war. ERC participated successively in any initiative that confronts the Dictatorship.

=== Transition to democracy and the years of decline (1976–1987) ===
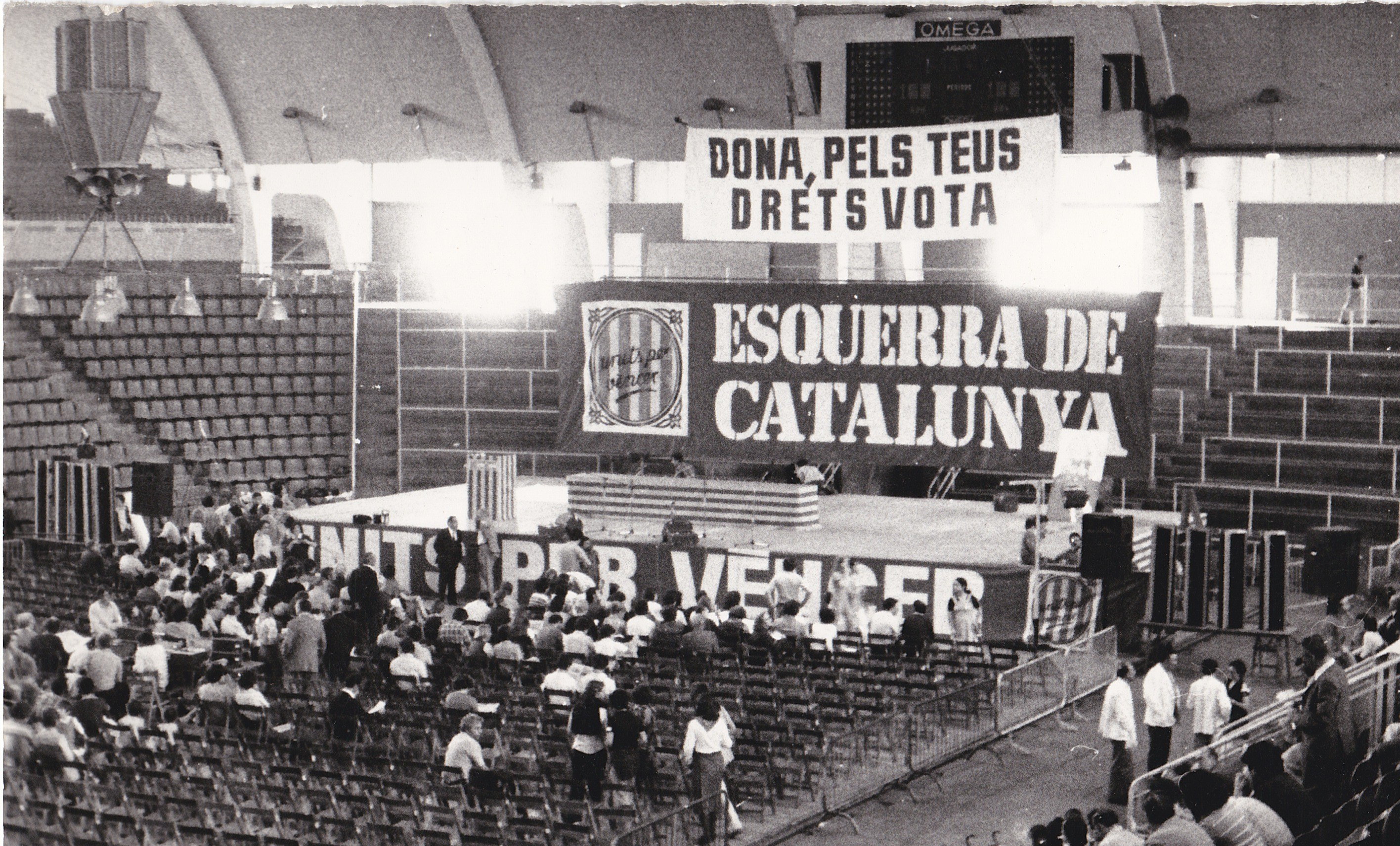
Public act of Left of Catalonia–Democratic Electoral Front (1977)

After the death of General Franco (1975), ERC celebrated in July 1976 the 8th National Congress, in which Barrera was confirmed as leader. In the election to Constituent Cortes of 1977, ERC went into coalition, as it was not yet legalized because of its status as a Republican party. ERC had requested registration in the register of political parties on 14 March of that year, but the Ministry of Interior - a month after the elections - responded: "The name proposed by the entity, referring to a political system incompatible with the one that is legally valid in Spain, can represent an assumption of inadmissibility ". The party tried a coalition with Left Front or with Democratic Convergence, although finally it allied with the Party of Labour of Spain. The name of the electoral coalition was Left of Catalonia–Democratic Electoral Front (Esquerra de Catalunya-Front Electoral Democràtic). The coalition won a seat (Barrera). Some of the electoral promises were the Statute of Autonomy or a referendum about the Monarchy.

In October 1977, President Josep Tarradellas (a founder of the party in 1931) returned to Catalonia and the Generalitat was restored. A new text of the Statute was drafted, which ERC opposed because it did not guarantee a minimum self-government. However, in the referendum for its approval, in 1979, ERC was in favour, as it was the only way to regain autonomy. In the first election to the restored Parliament of Catalonia, in 1980, ERC obtained 14 seats (out of a total of 135), which brought Barrera to the Presidency of the Parliament of Catalonia. At the crossroads of forming a tripartite with the PSUC and the socialists or favouring Convergència i Unió (CiU), Barrera—refractory to alliances with parties from a Marxist tradition—determined ERC would vote Jordi Pujol (CiU) as president of the Generalitat without compensation and without joining the government, as a gesture of "national unity". In 1984, however, ERC only obtained five deputies, and began a brief period of decline, overshadowed by the hegemony of the center-right Catalan nationalist coalition CiU. This trend persisted during the next years. In 1986, it lost its presence in the Spanish Cortes.

=== Recovering (1986–1996) ===
In 1987, the National Call manifesto was published, signed by personalities like Àngel Colom and Josep-Lluís Carod-Rovira, who wanted ERC to bring together the new generation of independentists that aroses as a result of the disenchantment with the Spanish Transition. The entrance of these young people dynamizes the party, and in the Catalan election of 1988 obtained six seats. In 1989 a new direction led by Àngel Colom assumed the independence of Catalonia as a political aim. As a result of this new orientation, in 1990, the National Front of Catalonia, a historic organization founded in exile in 1940, joined ERC. In 1991, the organization Terra Lliure reconsidered its strategy, and abandoned the armed struggle, where some of its members joined ERC and many of those who formed Catalunya Lliure were incorporated too. These facts turned ERC, de facto, into the reference of the left-wing Catalan independentism.

The results obtained in the 1992 election to the Parliament of Catalonia placed ERC as the third political force of Catalonia, with the support of more than 210,000 voters and the obtaining of 11 seats, after a campaign in which, for the first time a party that appeared as a pro-independence party was widely popular. The 18th National Congress of ERC, held in June 1992, approved the reform of its statutes in the face of electoral growth, militancy and territorial presence. ERC advocates in its first statutory article the territorial unity and independence of the Catalan Countries, building its own state within the European framework and together with an ideological position of the left that takes the defense of democracy and environment, human rights and rights of the peoples, and based its ideology and political action on social progress and solidarity.

In the 1993 Spanish general election, ERC recovered its presence in the Congress of Deputies. The same year, Jordi Carbonell and Avel·lí Artís i Gener "Tísner", Left Nationalists members, joined ERC. The local elections of 28 May 1995 represented an important quantitative and qualitative leap of the institutional presence of the party. ERC recovered the presence in many local councils of Catalonia, reaching more than 550 elected councillors and 32 mayors, and thus becomes the third municipal political force. In the 1995 Catalan election, ERC obtained the best result in number of votes since the Republic era, more than 305,000 voters and 13 seats.

In 1996, after a serious internal crisis, Àngel Colom, along with Pilar Rahola left the party and founded the Independence Party. This party, however, had a short life. In the local elections of 1999, they obtained poor results and Pilar Rahola, who presented himself as head of the list in Barcelona, did not obtain a seat. After that, the party was dissolved.

=== New era with Carod Rovira and return to the Government ===
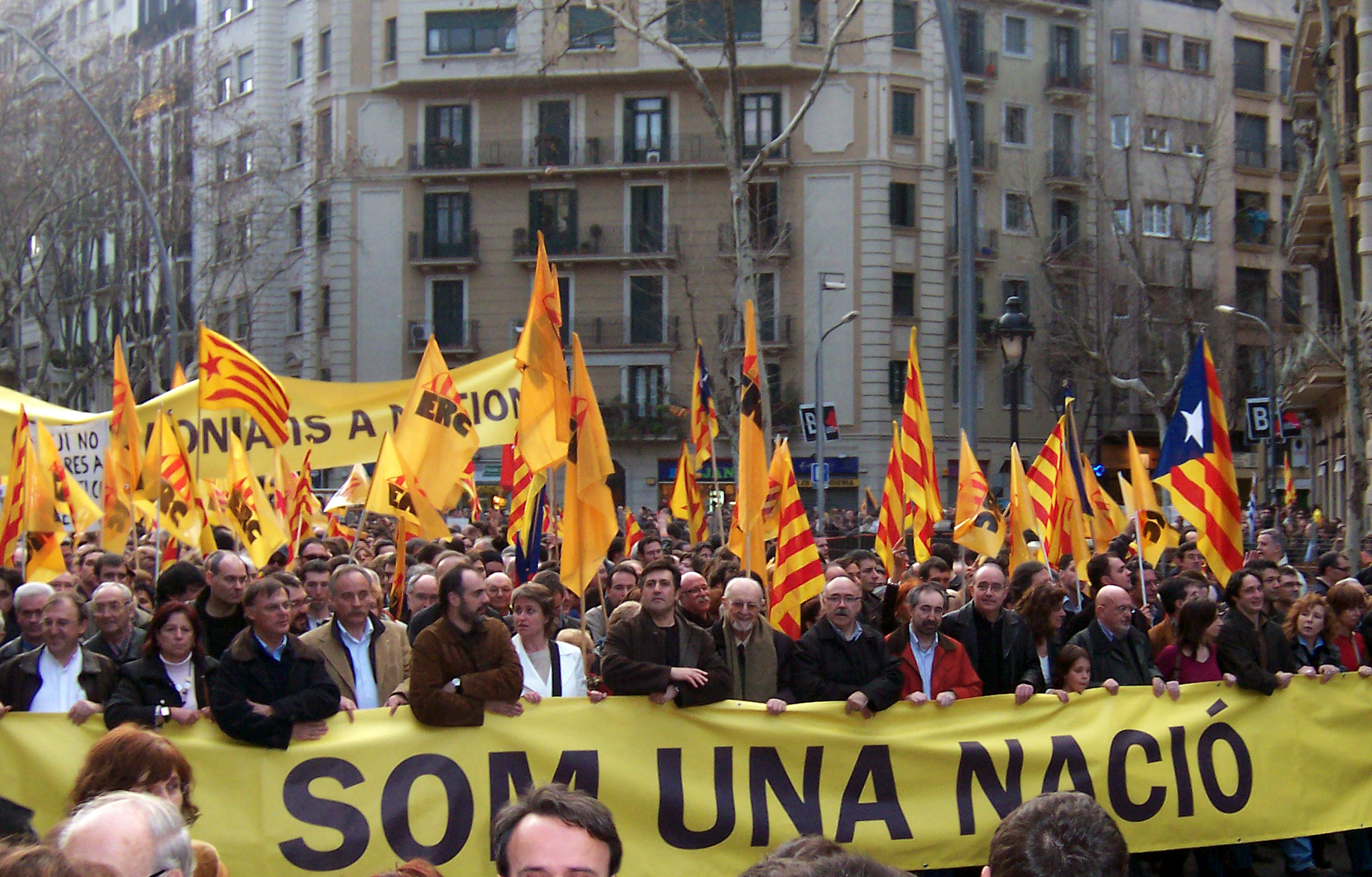
ERC leaders leading the demonstration of 18-02-2006 in Barcelona with the slogan Som una Nació ("We are a Nation")

In November 1996, the 21st National Congress of ERC was held. The militants chose a new direction for the party, with Josep Lluís Carod-Rovira as new president and Joan Puigcercós as new general secretary. The new direction announced some changes on the strategy: it does not renounce the independence of Catalonia, but it stops using that idea as the only reference. The new direction wanted to place the party as the new reference of the Catalan left.

On 16 November 2003, in the election to the Parliament of Catalonia, ERC obtained 23 seats, becoming the "key party" that would define the composition of the government, since to obtain the majority the other parties were obliged to agree with ERC. After several weeks in which it seemed that he would close an agreement with CiU (center-right and nationalist party), it finally opted for a "progressive pact" (called the Pact of the Tinell or popularly the "Tripartit") with the Socialists' Party of Catalonia and the ecosocialist coalition ICV-EUiA.

ERC became part of the tripartite government of the Generalitat, chaired by the socialist Pasqual Maragall, assuming six government departments, among which the "Conseller en Cap" (Prime Minister), belonging to Carod-Rovira. The other five ministries assumed by ERC were Education (Josep Bargalló), Welfare and Family (Anna Simó), Commerce, Tourism and Consumption (Pere Esteve), Government and Public Administration (Joan Carretero) and Universities, Research and Information Society (Carles Solà). In addition, another ERC leader, Ernest Benach, was elected President of the Parliament.

Despite having been one of the main forces behind the movement for amendment, the party eventually opposed the 2006 changes to the Catalan Statute of Autonomy to increase Catalonia's autonomy. It did so on the grounds that it did not do enough to increase Catalan self-government. This caused a government crisis with its partners (specially with the PSC) which led to an early election in 2006.

After 2006, the three original coalition partners remade the coalition, this time led by the socialist José Montilla who became President of the Generalitat on 28 November of that year. It was voted out of power in 2010.

=== Procés and pro-independence governments ===
On 27 June 2010, the Constitutional Court of Spain published the ruling on the 2006 Catalan Statute of Autonomy. The ruling slashed significant parts of the text and made the law voted and passed by the Catalan public in a referendum null and void. This, alongside the growing instability brought by the 2008 financial crisis, fueled a growing independence movement in the country. After the party's poor results in the 2010 Catalan election and an electoral domination by the center-right CiU, then President Artur Mas called for a snap vote to receive a mandate to pursue independence. In this election, celebrated in 2012, ERC achieved a historical feat and beat the PSC in seats and became the second-largest party in the Catalan Parliament running on a purely pro-independence platform.

After this, CiU and ERC, two of the three pro-independence parties in the Catalan Parliament, articulated a majority to form a CiU minority government with the explicit mandate to organize a non-binding referendum. This materialized in 2014 with what was then called the Procés Participatiu 9N (in English: Participative Process November 9th) which was ruled illegal by Spanish Courts. The pro-independence option won this non-binding popular inquiry by a large margin, given with little-to-no turnout by unionist voters.

Despite these results, the Spanish government refused to approve a binding and legal referendum on independence and the pro-independence movement pushed for a unitary candidacy in another snap election. This snap election was considered to be a plebiscite on independence and a legal way to ask the Catalan people about the issue without needing the Spanish Government's permission. ERC led the coalition talks, often as a bridge between the center-right CDC and the far-left CUP, which had significant disagreements. In the end, the CUP contested the election alone and the pro-independence unitary coalition was formed only by CDC, ERC and some pro-independence factions of the PSC, ICV, UDC. The name given to this coalition, which also integrated many non-politicians, was Junts pel Sí (in English: Together for the Yes). After the 2015 catalan election, Junts pel Sí emerged victorious with 62 seats, 37 more than the second-most voted option. Among these, ERC and ERC-aligned independents held 21 seats. However, the coalition came 6 seats short of a majority and needed the CUP's 10 seats' support to form government.

After arduous coalition talks, the CUP allowed the formation of a CDC-ERC coalition government on the condition that Artur Mas, the until-then de facto leader of the Procés stepped aside. This permitted the investiture of Carles Puigdemont and the return of ERC to government, 5 years after the loss of the leftist tripartite coalition. ERC had 5 cabinet members and its leader, Oriol Junqueras, became Vicepresident of the Generalitat.This new government assumed the task of organizing a binding independence referendum before 2018.

The 9th of June of 2017, President Puigdemont accompanied by ERC's leader Vicepresident Junqueras unveiled the date and question of the referendum, which was set to take place October 1st 2017, with or without the permission of the Spanish Government. This prompted a reaction by the Spanish Courts, which declared the referendum illegal and issued warrants to stop the vote by any means necessary. Ballot boxes and ballots were targeted, Catalan Government offices were raided, websites were expropriated and pro-independence civil leaders were jailed.

These actions were unsuccessful in stopping the vote and the referendum was held as scheduled. Both the Spanish National Police and the Guardia Civil were sent to physically stop Catalan citizens from voting, some coming to Catalonia from elsewhere in Spain chanting "a por ellos" (english: "let's get them"). This resulted in a violent crackdown by the Spanish Police on voters, many of which sustaining injuries. Despite this, many votes were counted and the pro-independence option won by a landslide, again with a boycott by unionist voters. Subsequently, the Catalan Government presented a motion on independence on the 27th of October of 2017 in the Catalan Parliament, which passed. This declaration however was never published in the Official Diary of the Generalitat de Catalunya and, years later, pro-independence leaders would qualify it as "symbolic".

After this declaration, the Senate of Spain passed the application of the 155th article of the Constitution of Spain, which suspended Catalan autonomy and forcefully removed from office the sitting Catalan Government. Additionally, all Catalan government members which stayed on Spanish soil were jailed, including Vicepresident Oriol Junqueras and the rest of ERC's cabinet members. The Spanish Government called for another snap election in December 2017 to restore Catalan self-rule.

ERC, without a free leader, chose to still run the jailed Oriol Junqueras while the General Secretary of the party, Marta Rovira, assumed his functions both organically and institutionally. This resulted on a third place with 32 seats, a historical high since Spain's return to democracy. Pro-independence parties renewed their absolute majority and ERC and Junts per Catalunya, CDC's heir, formed a coalition government with the CUP's external support.

Before this renewed coalition could assume power, Marta Rovira was also involved in the Referendum judicial case and came under serious threat of being jailed. Given this, she chose exile to Switzerland. Pere Aragonès, former leader of the Young Republican Left of Catalonia, became vicepresident of the Generalitat representing ERC, with Junts per Catalunya's Quim Torra assuming the presidency. ERC appointed 7 cabinet members, most notably the Catalan Health Minister. This cabinet led Catalonia, which has competences over heath policy, through the pandemic. ERC's Alba Vergés, as Health Minister, held a significant leadership position.

On September 28th 2020, the Supreme Court of Spain ratified Quim Torra's inhabilitation due to his disobedience in not removing a banner in support to the Catalan jailed politicians from the Palau de la Generalitat. He was subsequently forcefully removed from power and the Vicepresident of the Generalitat, ERC's Pere Aragonès, became interim president. This was the first time since the Second Spanish Republic that a member of Republican Left of Catalonia assumed the powers of the presidency.

In 2021, a new Catalan election was held, the first one on schedule since 2010. In this election ERC surpassed Junts and became the largest pro-independence party in the chamber, even tying for first place in seats with a resurgent PSC. Pro-independence parties renewed their majority in seats, and for the first time in history, in votes. This led to coalition talks, which resulted in a ERC led pro-independence government with Junts as a junior partner and the CUP's external support. In May 2021, Pere Aragonès became the first ERC President of the Generalitat since 1978.

In October 2022, after less than 2 years, the coalition fell through and Junts left the Catalan executive leading to a widespread government restructuring and leaving ERC as the sole party in power in the country. This minority government struggled to pass legislation, and most notably, to approve a budget. Despite this, they started many legislative processes, such as the National Agreement for the Language, the Statute of Rural Municipalities and the Neighbourhoods and Towns Plan, however, none of these came to fruition during the government's tenure.In the end, in March 2024, following the fall-through of negotiations with the Comuns for the approval of the 2024 budget, President Aragonès resigned and called for a snap election for April of that same year.

=== End of the Procés and new tripartite coalition ===
In the May 2024 election, ERC lost 13 seats and became the third largest party in the Catalan Parliament, losing the Presidency of the Generalitat. Pro-independence parties fell short of a majority for the first time since 2012 and the coalition that had governed the country for 12 years became impossible.

After a few months of negotiations, ERC supported Salvador Illa's candidacy to become President of the Generalitat alongside Comuns Sumar. This support was given in exchange for major advances in Catalonia's sovereignty and self-rule, most notably a federalized tax system, as well as the PSC's explicit commitment to the defence of Catalonia's status as a nation and the Catalan language. This agreement was later ratified by the PSOE as well, ensuring support in the Spanish Congress.

In August 2024, the PSC formed its first minority government in history, however with external support from its traditional partners of the tripartite leftist coalition, the largest of which is ERC. As of December 2025, ERC and the PSC have failed to reach an agreement regarding budget because none of the major concessions to Catalonia promised by the PSC have yet been realized. Despite this, both party's relationship is considered 'in good health' given the PSC efforts to fulfill the promises it made to the republicans.

== Ideology ==
The party has been described historically as social democratic and more recently as democratic socialist. ERC is a strong supporter of Catalan independence, as well as being regionalist, Catalan nationalist, eco-nationalist, and left-wing nationalist. Additionally, it advocates for republicanism and regionalism, and has a federalist faction. It is a catch-all/big tent party in nature, and is generally positioned as centre-left to left-wing.

ERC is also considered to be feminist, pro-immigration, pro-LGBTQIA+ rights, environmentalist, municipalist, pro-European, anti-racist, anti-colonialist and anti-fascist.

== Political principles and representation ==
Its basic political principles are defined in the Statement of Ideology approved at the 19th National Congress in 1993. This is organised into the three areas that give the organisation its name: Esquerra (commitment to the Left's agenda in the political, economic and social debate), República (commitment to the Republican form of government vs. Spain's current constitutional monarchy) and Catalunya (Catalan independentism, which, as understood by ERC, comprises the Catalan Countries).

The party is also federated with parties in the Balearic Islands and in Northern Catalonia in France, as well as with Republican Left of the Valencian Country in the Valencian Community. Except for their Balearic counterpart, none of the latter currently have any parliamentary representation in their respective territories, though they do have eight municipal councillors in the Balearic Islands and six councillors in the Valencian Community. Occitan Republican Left, formed in 2008, acts as the Aranese section of the party.

The Republican Left of Catalonia is the oldest political party in Catalan politics that has supported the idea of a sovereign Catalan nation for the entirety of its existence. From the inception of ERC in 1931, they have always been in favor of statehood for Catalonia.

After the last Catalan parliamentary election in 2024, the Republican Left of Catalonia has 20 seats in the Parliament of Catalonia, making it the third largest in the chamber. Until 2010, it was one of the three coalition members of the tripartite left-wing Catalan Government, together with Socialists' Party of Catalonia (PSC) and Initiative for Catalonia Greens (ICV). The coalition was often uneasy due to tensions related to the new Statute of Autonomy of Catalonia. They governed Catalonia during the procés period alongside Junts, and held the presidency between 2021 and 2023. Since 2024 they are considered either preferential partners or confidence and supply to Salvador Illa's cabinet, givent that it was the support of their 20 seats in Parliament (alongside Comuns Sumar's) which permitted the PSC to form a minority government. Out of Catalonia, it has seven seats in the Spanish Parliament, six seats in the Senate (where they sit together with the basque EH Bildu) and one seat in the European Parliament.

== Leadership ==
| Portrait | Name (Birth–Death) | Term of office | | | Secretary-General (Tenure) |
| Portrait | Name (Birth–Death) | Took office | Left office | Duration | Secretary-General (Tenure) |
|---|---|---|---|---|---|
| | Francesc Macià (1859–1933) | 22 February 1931 | 25 December 1933 | 2 years and 306 days | Joan Lluís Pujol (1931–1931) |
| | Francesc Macià (1859–1933) | 22 February 1931 | 25 December 1933 | 2 years and 306 days | Josep Tarradellas (1931–1932) |
| | Francesc Macià (1859–1933) | 22 February 1931 | 25 December 1933 | 2 years and 306 days | Joan Tauler (1932–1938) |
| | Lluís Companys (1882–1940) | 25 December 1933 | 6 October 1934 | 285 days | Joan Tauler (1932–1938) |
| | Carles Pi i Sunyer (1888–1971) | 6 October 1934 | 11 May 1936 | 1 year and 218 days | Joan Tauler (1932–1938) |
| | Lluís Companys (1882–1940) | 11 May 1936 | 15 October 1940 | 4 years and 157 days | Joan Tauler (1932–1938) |
| | Lluís Companys (1882–1940) | 11 May 1936 | 15 October 1940 | 4 years and 157 days | Josep Tarradellas (1938–1957) |
| | | | | | Joan Sauret (1957–1976) |
Heribert Barrera (1976–1987)
Joan Hortalà (1987–1989)
Àngel Colom (1989–1996)
| | Heribert Barrera (1917–2011) | 15 December 1991 | 10 July 1995 | 3 years and 207 days | Àngel Colom (1989–1996) |
| | Jaume Campabadal (1924–2016) | 10 July 1995 | 24 November 1996 | 1 year and 137 days | Àngel Colom (1989–1996) |
| | Jordi Carbonell (1924–2016) | 24 November 1996 | 4 July 2004 | 7 years and 223 days | Josep-Lluís Carod-Rovira (1996–2004) |
| | Josep-Lluís Carod-Rovira (born 1952) | 4 July 2004 | 7 June 2008 | 3 years and 339 days | Joan Puigcercós (2004–2008) |
| | Joan Puigcercós (born 1966) | 7 June 2008 | 17 September 2011 | 3 years and 102 days | Joan Ridao (2008–2011) |
| | Oriol Junqueras (born 1969) | 17 September 2011 | Incumbent | 15 years and 61 days | Marta Rovira (2011–2024) |
| | Oriol Junqueras (born 1969) | 17 September 2011 | Incumbent | 15 years and 61 days | Elisenda Alamany (2024–present) |

== Electoral performance ==
=== Parliament of Catalonia ===
Parliament of Catalonia
| Election | Leading candidate | Votes | % | Seats | Gov. |
| 1932 | Francesc Macià | 224,800 | 47.1 (#1) | 56 / 85 | Yes |
Francoist dictatorship
| 1980 | Heribert Barrera | 240,871 | 8.9 (#5) | 14 / 135 | (Note: Confidence and supply.) |
| 1984 | Heribert Barrera | 126,943 | 4.4 (#5) | 5 / 135 | Yes (Note: 1984–1987.) |
| 1984 | Heribert Barrera | 126,943 | 4.4 (#5) | 5 / 135 | No (Note: 1987–1988.) |
| 1988 | Joan Hortalà | 111,647 | 4.1 (#5) | 6 / 135 | No |
| 1992 | Àngel Colom | 210,366 | 8.0 (#3) | 11 / 135 | No |
| 1995 | Àngel Colom | 305,867 | 9.5 (#5) | 13 / 135 | No |
| 1999 | Josep-Lluís Carod-Rovira | 271,173 | 8.7 (#4) | 12 / 135 | No |
| 2003 | Josep-Lluís Carod-Rovira | 544,324 | 16.4 (#3) | 23 / 135 | Yes (Note: 2003–2006.) |
| 2003 | Josep-Lluís Carod-Rovira | 544,324 | 16.4 (#3) | 23 / 135 | No (Note: 2006.) |
| 2006 | Josep-Lluís Carod-Rovira | 416,355 | 14.0 (#3) | 21 / 135 | Yes |
| 2010 | Joan Puigcercós | 219,173 | 7.0 (#5) | 10 / 135 | No |
| 2012 | Oriol Junqueras | Within ERC–CatSí | | 19 / 135 | Orange tick |
| 2015 | Artur Mas | Within JxSí | | 24 / 135 | Yes |
| 2017 | Oriol Junqueras (Note: At the time of the election, Junqueras was in preventive detention in Estremera (Madrid).) | Within ERC–CatSí | | 30 / 135 | Yes |
| 2021 | Pere Aragonès | 605,529 | 21.3 (#2) | 33 / 135 | Yes |
| 2024 | Pere Aragonès | 431,128 | 13.7 (#3) | 20 / 135 | Orange tick |

=== Parliament of the Balearic Islands ===
Parliament of the Balearic Islands
| Election | Votes | % | # | Seats | +/– | Leading candidate | Status in legislature |
| 1995 | 2,082 | 0.55% | 7th | 0 / 59 | — | | No seats |
| 1999 | 1,106 | 0.30% | 8th | 0 / 59 | 0 | | No seats |
| 2003 | 1,667 | 0.39% | 9th | 0 / 59 | 0 | Catalina Gelabert | No seats |
| 2007 | Within Bloc | | | 1 / 59 | 1 | Biel Barceló | Coalition (PSIB–Bloc–UM) |
| 2007 | Within Bloc | | | 1 / 59 | 1 | Biel Barceló | Coalition (PSIB–Bloc; from Feb. 2010) |
| 2011 | 5,325 | 1.27% | 8th | 0 / 59 | 1 | Joan Lladó | No seats |
| 2015 | 766 | 0.18% | 17th | 0 / 59 | 0 | Josep Antoni Prats | No seats |

=== Cortes Republicanas ===
Cortes republicanas
| Election | Congress | | | | | Leading candidate | Status in legislature |
| Election | Votes | % | # | Seats | +/– | Leading candidate | Status in legislature |
| 1931 | — | 6.20% | 4th | 29 / 473 | New | Lluís Companys | No (Note: 1931) |
| 1931 | — | 6.20% | 4th | 29 / 473 | New | Lluís Companys | Yes (Note: 1931–1933) |
| 1933 | — | 3.60% | 7th | 17 / 473 | 12 | Lluís Companys | No |
| 1936 | Within Popular Front | | | 21 / 473 | 4 | Joan Casanovas i Maristany | (Note: 1936) |
| 1936 | Within Popular Front | | | 21 / 473 | 4 | Joan Casanovas i Maristany | Yes (Note: 1936–1938) |
| 1936 | Within Popular Front | | | 21 / 473 | 4 | Joan Casanovas i Maristany | (Note: 1938–1939) |
| 1936 | Within Popular Front | | | 21 / 473 | 4 | Joan Casanovas i Maristany | No (Note: 1939) |

=== Cortes Generales ===
Cortes Generales
| Election | Leading candidate | Congress | | | Senate | | | Gov. |
| Election | Leading candidate | Votes | % | Seats | Votes | % | Seats | Gov. |
| 1977 | Heribert Barrera | Within EC–FED | | 1 / 350 | Within Entesa | | 1 / 208 | No |
| 1979 | Heribert Barrera | 123,452 | 0.7 (#13) | 1 / 350 | Within Nova Entesa | | 2 / 208 | No |
| 1982 | Francesc Vicens | 138,118 | 0.7 (#9) | 1 / 350 | Within CaS | | 2 / 208 | No |
| 1986 | Francesc Vicens | 84,628 | 0.4 (#12) | 0 / 350 | 255,718 | 0.5 (#12) | 0 / 208 | — |
| 1989 | Joan Hortalà | 84,756 | 0.4 (#16) | 0 / 350 | 239,532 | 0.4 (#17) | 0 / 208 | — |
| 1993 | Pilar Rahola | 189,632 | 0.8 (#9) | 1 / 350 | 239,546 | 0.4 (#15) | 0 / 208 | No |
| 1996 | Pilar Rahola | 167,641 | 0.7 (#9) | 1 / 350 | 493,480 | 0.7 (#8) | 0 / 208 | No |
| 2000 | Joan Puigcercós | 194,715 | 0.8 (#9) | 1 / 350 | Within Entesa | | 1 / 208 | No |
| 2004 | Josep Lluís Carod-Rovira | 652,196 | 2.5 (#5) | 8 / 350 | Within Entesa | | 3 / 208 | Orange tick |
| 2008 | Joan Ridao | 298,139 | 1.2 (#7) | 3 / 350 | Within Entesa | | 3 / 208 | No |
| 2011 | Alfred Bosch | Within ERC–CatSí | | 3 / 350 | Within ERC–CatSí | | 0 / 208 | No |
| 2015 | Gabriel Rufián | Within ERC–CatSí | | 9 / 350 | Within ERC–CatSí | | 6 / 208 | — |
| 2016 | Gabriel Rufián | Within ERC–CatSí | | 9 / 350 | Within ERC–CatSí | | 10 / 208 | No |
| Apr. 2019 | Oriol Junqueras (Note: At the time of the election, Junqueras was in preventive detention in Soto del Real (Madrid).) | Within ERC–Sob. | | 14 / 350 | Within ERC–Sob. | | 11 / 208 | — |
| Nov. 2019 | Gabriel Rufián | Within ERC–Sob. | | 12 / 350 | Within ERC–Sob. | | 11 / 208 | Orange tick |
| 2023 | Gabriel Rufián | 466,020 | 1.9 (#5) | 7 / 350 | Within IPLI | | 3 / 208 | Orange tick |

=== Regional breakdown ===
| Election | Catalonia | | | | | | |
| Election | Congress | | | | | Senate | |
| Election | Votes | % | # | Seats | +/– | Seats | +/– |
|---|---|---|---|---|---|---|---|
| 1977 | Within EC–FED | | | 1 / 47 | — | 1 / 16 | — |
| 1979 | 123,452 | 4.18% | 5th | 1 / 47 | 0 | 2 / 16 | 1 |
| 1982 | 138,118 | 4.02% | 5th | 1 / 47 | 0 | 2 / 16 | 0 |
| 1986 | 84,628 | 2.67% | 6th | 0 / 47 | 1 | 0 / 16 | 2 |
| 1989 | 84,756 | 2.68% | 6th | 0 / 46 | 0 | 0 / 16 | 0 |
| 1993 | 186,784 | 5.10% | 5th | 1 / 47 | 1 | 0 / 16 | 0 |
| 1996 | 162,545 | 4.18% | 5th | 1 / 46 | 0 | 0 / 16 | 0 |
| 2000 | 190,292 | 5.64% | 4th | 1 / 46 | 0 | 1 / 16 | 1 |
| 2004 | 638,902 | 15.89% | 3rd | 8 / 47 | 7 | 3 / 16 | 2 |
| 2008 | 291,532 | 7.83% | 4th | 3 / 47 | 5 | 3 / 16 | 0 |
| 2011 | Within ERC–CatSí | | | 3 / 47 | 0 | 0 / 16 | 3 |
| 2015 | Within ERC–CatSí | | | 9 / 47 | 6 | 6 / 16 | 6 |
| 2016 | Within ERC–CatSí | | | 9 / 47 | 0 | 10 / 16 | 4 |
| 2019 (Apr) | Within ERC–Sobiranistes | | | 14 / 48 | 5 | 11 / 16 | 1 |
| 2019 (Nov) | Within ERC–Sobiranistes | | | 12 / 48 | 2 | 11 / 16 | 0 |
| 2023 | 466,020 | 13.15% | 4th | 7 / 48 | 6 | 3 / 16 | 8 |

| Election | Balearic Islands | | | | | | |
| Election | Congress | | | | | Senate | |
| Election | Votes | % | # | Seats | +/– | Seats | +/– |
|---|---|---|---|---|---|---|---|
| 1993 | 2,848 | 0.69% | 8th | 0 / 7 | 0 | 0 / 5 | 0 |
| 1996 | 1,802 | 0.42% | 7th | 0 / 7 | 0 | 0 / 5 | 0 |
| 2000 | 1,340 | 0.34% | 7th | 0 / 7 | 0 | 0 / 5 | 0 |
| 2004 | Within Progressistes | | | 0 / 8 | 0 | 0 / 5 | 0 |
| 2008 | Within UIB | | | 0 / 8 | 0 | 0 / 5 | 0 |
| 2011 | 4,681 | 1.07% | 6th | 0 / 8 | 0 | 0 / 5 | 0 |
| 2016 | Within SI | | | 0 / 8 | 0 | 0 / 5 | 0 |
| 2019 (Apr) | Within VP | | | 0 / 8 | 0 | 0 / 5 | 0 |
| 2019 (Nov) | Within Més Esquerra | | | 0 / 8 | 0 | 0 / 5 | 0 |

=== European Parliament ===
European Parliament
| Election | Total | | | | | Catalonia | | | Balearic Islands | | | Valencian Community (Note: Since 2000 as Republican Left of the Valencian Country.) | | |
| Election | Votes | % | # | Seats | +/– | Votes | % | # | Votes | % | # | Votes | % | # |
| 1987 | Within CEP | | | 0 / 60 | — | 112,107 | 3.70% | 6th | 533 | 0.16% | 16th | —N/a | | |
| 1989 | Within PEP | | | 0 / 60 | 0 | 78,408 | 3.29% | 6th | —N/a | | | —N/a | | |
| 1994 | Within PEP | | | 0 / 64 | 0 | 141,285 | 5.52% | 5th | 2,350 | 0.81% | 8th | 2,482 | 0.12% | 11th |
| 1999 | Within CN–EP | | | 0 / 64 | 0 | 174,374 | 6.06% | 4th | —N/a | | | 3,057 | 0.13% | 10th |
| 2004 | Within EdP | | | 1 / 54 | 1 | 249,757 | 11.80% | 4th | 7,498 | 2.87% | 5th | 15,703 | 0.90% | 5th |
| 2009 | Within EdP–V | | | 1 / 54 | 0 | 181,213 | 9.20% | 4th | 7,651 | 2.97% | 4th | 9,807 | 0.52% | 7th |
| 2014 | Within EPDD | | | 1 / 54 | 0 | 595,493 | 23.69% | 1st | 19,602 | 7.26% | 5th | 8,129 | 0.46% | 13th |
| 2019 | Within AR | | | 2 / 59 | 1 | 727,039 | 21.21% | 3rd | 20,464 | 4.90% | 6th | 12,388 | 0.54% | 8th |
| 2024 | Within AR | | | 1 / 61 | 1 | 355,460 | 14.81% | 3rd | —N/a | | | 8,500 | 0.43% | 9th |

== See also ==
- List of political parties in Catalonia
- Republican Youth of Catalonia
- Statute of Autonomy of Catalonia
- History of political Catalanism

== Sources ==
- Rosenberg, S. L. Millard (May 1933). "Political News from Spain". Hispania. 16 (2). American Association of Teachers of Spanish and Portuguese: 207–218. JSTOR 332731.
- Culla, Joan B. (2012). Esquerra Republicana de Catalunya 1931-2012 (1st ed.). La Campana. ISBN 978-84-96735-82-8.
- Canal, Jordi (2018). "Entre el autonomismo y la independencia: nacionalismo, nación y procesos de nacionalización en Cataluña (1980-2015)". In Sepúlveda Muñoz, Isidro (ed.). Nación y nacionalismos en la España de las autonomías. Madrid: Agencia Estatal Boletín Oficial del Estado. pp. 77–108. ISBN 978-84-340-2494-6.
