= Joan Lluhí =

Spanish lawyer and politician

Joan Lluhí i Vallescà

Minister of Labor, Health and Social Assurance
- In office 13 May 1936 – 19 July 1936
- Preceded by: Enrique Ramos y Ramos
- Succeeded by: Bernardo Giner de los Ríos García

Minister of Communications and Merchant Navy
- In office 19 July 1936 – 19 July 1936
- Preceded by: Bernardo Giner de los Ríos García
- Succeeded by: Bernardo Giner de los Ríos García

Minister of Labor, Health and Social Assurance
- In office 19 July 1936 – 4 September 1936
- Preceded by: Bernardo Giner de los Ríos García
- Succeeded by: José Tomás y Piera

Personal details
- Born: 12 October 1897 Barcelona, Spain
- Died: 21 August 1944 (aged 46) Mexico
- Occupation: Lawyer, politician

Joan Lluhí i Vallescà (Spanish: Juan Lluhí Vallescá; 12 October 1897 – 21 August 1944) was a Spanish lawyer and politician. He was a member of the Republican Left of Catalonia (ERC), later leading the breakaway Nationalist Republican Left Party (PNRE), before rejoining the ERC to serve in the Second Spanish Republic as Minister of Labor, Health and Social Assurance.

== Early years (1897–1931) ==
Joan Lluhí i Vallesca was born on 12 October 1897 in Barcelona. His father was Joaquim Lluhí i Rissech (1866–1926), a lawyer and founder of the Nationalist Republican Centre and the Republican Nationalist Federal Union. Joan Lluhí i Vallescà attended the Institute of Barcelona from 1910 to 1915 for his secondary education. He studied law at the University of Barcelona from 1915 to 1916 and then from 1919 to 1920. He became a lawyer and a Freemason. In 1929 he founded and edited the journal L'Opinió.

== Second Spanish Republic (1931–36) ==
Lluhí was a founding member of the Republican Left of Catalonia (ERC, Esquerra Republicana de Catalunya). He was elected deputy to the national legislature on 28 June 1931 for Barcelona. Lluhí was also elected a member of the Catalan parliament. He participated in drafting the 1932 Statute of Núria for Catalan autonomy. He was Director of Public Works in the government of the Generalitat of Catalonia initiated on 3 October 1932. From 19 December 1932 he was also President of the Executive Council of the Generalitat. He resigned in January 1933 because he could not agree with President Francesc Macià over the distribution of powers between the Executive Council and the President.

Lluhí was not included in the government initiated on 24 January 1933. He left the ERC in October 1933 to found the Nationalist Republican Left Party (PNRE), with the old followers of L'Opinió. He later led this group back into the ERC. He was appointed Director of Justice on 3 January 1934 in the first government of Lluís Companys. He was suspended from the government after the attempted revolution that followed the Asturian miners' strike of 1934. Lluhí was convicted for his participation in the events of October 1934 and on 6 June 1935 was disqualified from the legislature and sentenced to 30 years imprisonment. He served time in El Puerto de Santa María.

Lluhí was again elected deputy to the national legislature for Barcelona on 16 February 1936. He was pardoned by decree on 21 February 1936. He was again appointed Director of Justice and Law in the Generalitat on 1 March 1936, and left office when he was appointed national Minister of Labor. Lluhí became Minister of Labor, Health and Social Assurance in the government of Santiago Casares Quiroga on 13 May 1936. Catalonia had recently calmed down, and the appointment of Lluhí to the cabinet was expected to help reduce tensions in Spain as a whole. It soon became clear he was not competent for the post. In the days leading up to the outbreak of civil war in July 1936 he did not understand the growing danger.

== Civil War and exile (1936–44) ==
In the ephemeral 19 July 1936 government of Diego Martínez Barrio, formed just after the civil war broke out, Lluhí was Minister of Communications and Merchant Marine for a few hours. In the government of José Giral he was again Minister of Labor, Health and Social Assurance from 19 July 1936 to 4 September 1936. Lluhí was then consul of the Republic in Toulouse, France, until the end of the Spanish Civil War (1936–39). He was involved in Republican political espionage in France, watching both Spanish Nationalist agents and Italian agents supporting Franco. He went into exile after the defeat of the Republicans. Joan Lluhí always suffered from poor health. He died in Mexico on 21 August 1944, aged 46.

== Sources ==
- Arbeloa, Victor Manuel (2015-09-18). El quiebro del PSOE (1933-1934) Tomo 2: Del gobierno a la revolución (in Spanish). ACCI (Asoc. Cultural y Científica Iberoameric.). ISBN 978-84-15705-65-9.
- Miranda Boto, José María (2010). "LOS MINISTROS DE TRABAJO ENTRE 1920 Y 1936. UN ENSAYO DE PROSOPOGRAFÍA LABORAL" (PDF). Dereito (in Spanish). 19 (1). ISSN 1132-9947. Archived from the original (PDF) on March 4, 2016.
- Payne, Stanley G. (1993). Spain's First Democracy: The Second Republic, 1931-1936. Univ of Wisconsin Press. ISBN 978-0-299-13674-1.
- Preston, Paul (2003-09-02). Coming of the Spanish Civil War. Routledge. ISBN 1-134-92326-0.
- Rosenberg, S. L. Millard (May 1933). "Political News from Spain". Hispania. 16 (2). American Association of Teachers of Spanish and Portuguese: 207–218. JSTOR 332731.
- Rubió i Tudurí, Marià (2002). Barcelona, 1936-1939 (in Catalan). L'Abadia de Montserrat. ISBN 978-84-8415-427-3.
- Thomas, Hugh (2013-11-06). The Spanish Civil War: Revised Edition. Random House Publishing Group. ISBN 978-0-8041-5216-7.
- Urquijo y Goitia, José Ramón de (2008). Gobiernos y ministros españoles en la edad contemporánea (in Spanish). Editorial CSIC - CSIC Press. ISBN 978-84-00-08737-1.
