= Rafael Font Farran =

Spanish politician and journalist

Rafael Font Farran (26 May 1912, in Sitges, Barcelona Province, Spain – 19 November 2003, in Auxerre Burgundy, France) was a Spanish politician and journalist.

Font Farran was instrumental in founding the Catalan left-wing party Esquerra Republicana de Catalunya (ERC), but shifted to the Spanish left-wing POUM party on the outbreak of the Spanish Civil War. He was imprisoned in 1937 and fled to France at the end of the war. He became active in French as well as Spanish left-wing politics and was a member of the Fourth International.

He wrote a Marxist history of Spain, a history of Catalan nationalism, and a book of memoirs.

== 1928-1931 ==
In 1928, Rafael Font Farran was the editor and founder of a student magazine in Barcelona, L’Estudiant. After its fourth issue, this magazine was banned by Miguel Primo de Rivera’s dictatorship, to which it was opposed. In 1929, Font Farran, one of the leaders of the opposition to this dictatorship in University of Barcelona, was one of the founders of a student left-wing organization, Esquerra Universitària. He was also a founding member of a catalanist youth organization, Palestra, in April 1930. In May 1930, he joined Estat Català, Francesc Macia i Llussa’s political party. In August 1930, he published his first book, Paraules de Joventut, a political essay. He was the youngest speaker at the Conference of the Catalan left-wing parties, which, in Barcelona from 17 to 19 March 1931, gave rise to the Catalan political party ERC (Esquerra Republicana de Catalunya), of which Font Farran was a founder. Immediately after the proclamation of the "Catalan Republic" by Macià, president of the ERC, Font Farran participated, in the night of 14 April 1931, in the defense of the headquarters of the Catalan Government in Barcelona, because the ERC feared that the building could be attacked by Spanish troops. A few weeks later, Font Farran joined the Barcelona daily newspaper L’Opinió, the central organ of the ERC, in which he was responsible for international news.

== 1932-1933 ==
In the spring of 1932, there was a long controversy between Font Farran and Joan Peiró Belis, editor of Solidaridad Obrera - daily newspaper of the anarcho-syndicalist confederation CNT - with three articles written by Font Farran in L'Opinió and four articles by Peiró in Solidaridad Obrera. During the summer of 1932, in Madrid, Font Farran was private secretary to the member of the Parliament of Spain Lluís Companys i Jover, one of the leaders of the ERC and future president of Catalonia.

At the beginning of 1933, Font Farran was one of the leaders of a project of a new youth organization, "Joventut Esquerrista", inside ERC. In October 1933, he was one of the founders of the PNRE, a Catalan political party born out of a split with the ERC, and also one of the founders of the "Provisional Committee" of the youth organization of the PNRE. This project aimed to set up a new youth organization in rivalry with the JEREC (Joventuts de Esquerra Republicana Estat Català), which Font Farran considered to be fascistic, but the directors of the ERC decided that the JEREC would continue to be the only youth organization of the party. In December 1933, after the victory of the Spanish right-wing parties in the legislative election in November 1933, Font Farran published a new political essay, La crisi de les esquerres, in which he called upon the disunited Catalan left-wing parties to recover their “cohesion”.

== 1934-1936 ==
During the catalanist uprising on 6 October 1934, Font Farran participated again, as in 1931, in the defense of the headquarters of the Catalan Government in Barcelona, which the Spanish troops seized in the morning of 7 October. Font Farran was arrested and imprisoned, but he was finally discharged.

After the victory of the Spanish left-wing parties in the legislative election in February 1936, he was recruited by the Catalan Government for its CGOP, Catalan police headquarters, in which Font Farran was responsible for the censorship of foreign publications distributed in Catalonia, because as Font Farran explained the Catalan Government did not want to “alarm" public opinion about rumors of a military coup against the Spanish Republic.

Shortly after the beginning of the Spanish Civil War in July 1936, Font Farran resigned from the CGOP and joined the left-wing and anti-Stalinist party POUM and its daily newspaper La Batalla.

During the Spanish Civil War, Font Farran worked as a journalist for La Batalla, central organ of the POUM. In his book Homage to Catalonia, George Orwell, author of 1984, says he read La Batalla at the time when he fought in the ranks of the POUM.

== 1937-1939 ==
On 16 June 1937, Andreu Nin i Pérez, leader of the POUM, was arrested by Catalan police, which was in those days at the beck and call of Stalin’s representatives. Font Farran as Nin’s counsel went to the CGOP to ask after Nin. In the CGOP, he was almost arrested, but managed to escape. Some time later, as a counsel for Nin’s wife, Olga Pavlova Taareva, Font Farran lodged at Barcelona court-house a complaint which, he said, raised the possibility of an arbitrary arrest "or a kidnapping”. Later, in the summer of 1937, he opened in Barcelona a law firm for the defense of the imprisoned POUMist militants, and rented offices for it in his name. These offices were used by the POUM, which was prohibited and underground. In October 1937, Font Farran was arrested in Barcelona while distributing a POUM leaflet protesting against the death of a POUMist militant. He was incarcerated in the Modelo prison of Barcelona in the "second gallery," where POUMist prisoners were gathered together. He was elected "president" of this second gallery. In this gallery, where many POUMist militants, Spanish or foreigners, were imprisoned, Orwell would probably have been imprisoned too if he had not escaped from an arrest in Barcelona. But some time later, Font Farran was transferred to a convict prison, a hundred kilometers from Barcelona, the "labor camp No. 3", in the village of Els Omells de na Gaia.

Subsequently, he was tried in Barcelona by the "Special Court of espionage and high treason" of Catalonia, which sentenced him to six years in prison because of his membership of the POUM. In January 1939, with other prisoners evacuated from the Modelo prison of Barcelona, he fled to Northern Catalonia at the end of the Spanish civil war. In Catalonia under French administration, he was imprisoned in the camp of Saint-Cyprien, but he escaped a few days after his arrival. He then lived in Belgium for about a year.

== The 1940s ==
Following the German offensive in May 1940, he was transferred, with other exiles in Belgium, to the camp of Gurs, in South West of France, where, again, he was able to escape after a few weeks. Shortly after, in Paris, he joined the French Resistance against the German occupying forces, in the ranks of PCI (Parti Communiste Internationaliste). In 1943, he left this party - renamed meantime CCI (Comité communiste Internationaliste pour la Quatrième Internationale), of whose central committee he was a member - and he joined the POI (Parti ouvrier internationaliste), the French section of the Fourth International. Within the POI, he was one of the leaders of the GTE, which gathered together the Spanish members of the Fourth International. From 1943 on, he was the representative of Spain in the European Secretariat of the Fourth International. As a member of this European Secretariat, he was one of the main organizers of the difficult merger of the POI and the CCI in March 1944. He was also one of the Spanish delegates, with Eduardo Mauricio Ortiz, at the European Conference of the Fourth International in February 1944 in Picardy, and at the Second International Conference of the Fourth International in Paris in March 1946.

== Second half of the twentieth century ==
In 1951, he disagreed with the strategy of entryism launched by the Fourth International and he worked for several years on a project to form an anti-Stalinist Spanish communist party, in association with the former Stalinist leader José del Barrio Navarro and with the financial support of Tito's Yugoslavia. A few years later, he re-joined the POUM and, in the spring of 1961, he became a member of its executive committee. But in 1962 he disagreed with the party line and resigned from this executive committee and finally left the POUM. The following year, after twenty-four years of exile, he returned to Spain, where he began to publish articles in the weekly magazines Tele/Estel and L’Eco de Sitges. In 1956, he was recruited by the Agence France Presse, where, until his retirement in 1977, he worked as a journalist on the Spanish-language editorial staff, in Paris.

Font Farran wrote his memoirs under the title Anys agitats ("Stirring Years"). His eldest son, Rafael Font Vaillant, published in 2014 a biography of his father.

== Works ==
- Paraules de Joventut, Edicions Ariel, 1930.
- La crisi de les esquerres, Llibreria Catalònia, 1933.

== Sources ==
- Font Vaillant, Rafael (2014), ¡Adelante, adelante!, Editions Vilar. (ISBN 978-2-910395-08-7)
- Alexander, Robert J. (1991), International Trotskyism 1929–1985: A Documented Analysis of the Movement, Duke University Press. (ISBN 0-8223-0975-0)
- Figueras i Sabater, Arnau (2005), Història de la FNEC: la Federació Nacional d'Estudiants de Catalunya de 1932 a 1986, Publicacions de l'Abadia de Montserrat. (ISBN 84-8415-681-8)
- Guillamón, Agustín (1996), Documentación histórica del trosquismo español, 1936-1948 : de la Guerra Civil a la ruptura con la IV Internacional, Ediciones de la Torre. (ISBN 84-7960-130-2)
- Ivern i Salvà, M. Dolors (1988), Esquerra Republicana de Catalunya, 1931-1936, Publicacions de l’Abadia de Montserrat. (ISBN 84-7202-954-9)
- Prager, Rodolphe (1981), L'Internationale dans la guerre, 1940-1946, Editions La Brèche. (ISBN 2-902524-18-8)
