= Graciano López Jaena =

Filipino journalist, orator, and reformist

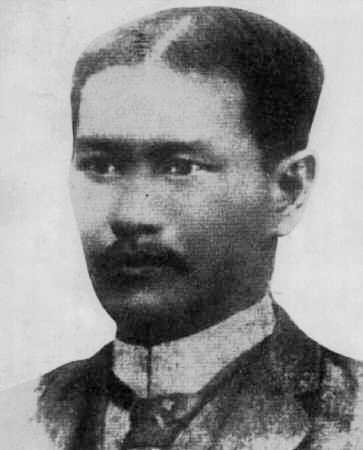
- Born: Graciano López y Jaena; December 18, 1856; Jaro, Iloilo, Captaincy General of the Philippines, Spanish Empire
- Died: January 20, 1896 (aged 39); Barcelona, Spain
- Resting place: Fossar de la Pedrera, Montjuïc Cemetery, Barcelona, Spain
- Education: St. Vincent Ferrer Seminary; University of Valencia
- Occupations: Writer, journalist, orator, propagandist
- Known for: La Solidaridad

Graciano López y Jaena (December 18, 1856 – January 20, 1896), commonly known as Graciano López Jaena (Tagalog pronunciation: [ˈlopes ˈhaɪna]), was a Filipino journalist, orator, reformist, and national hero who is well known for his newspaper, La Solidaridad (December 13, 1888).

Philippine historians universally regard López Jaena, alongside legal scholar Marcelo H. del Pilar and polymath José Rizal, as the definitive triumvirate of Filipino propagandists. Of these three towering ilustrados (Filipino educated elite), López Jaena was the first to depart for Europe and arrive in Spain in 1880, where he arguably initiated the concerted political action that became the Propaganda Movement.

This movement was a peaceful, yet fervent, crusade that vociferously advocated for the social, political, and economic reform of the then-Spanish colony of the Philippines, including demanding Philippine representation in the Spanish Cortes. Though non-violent, the intellectual and nationalist ferment created by the Movement, particularly through López Jaena's passionate essays like Fray Botod, played a crucial role in shaping a cohesive Philippine national identity and ultimately laying the intellectual foundation for the subsequent armed Philippine Revolution that officially erupted in Manila in 1896, just months after his untimely death from arterioscleriosis, possibly as a complication of tuberculosis.

== Biography ==
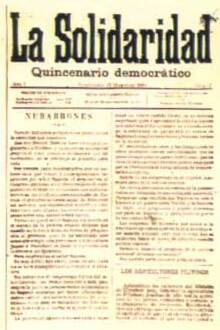
La Solidaridad

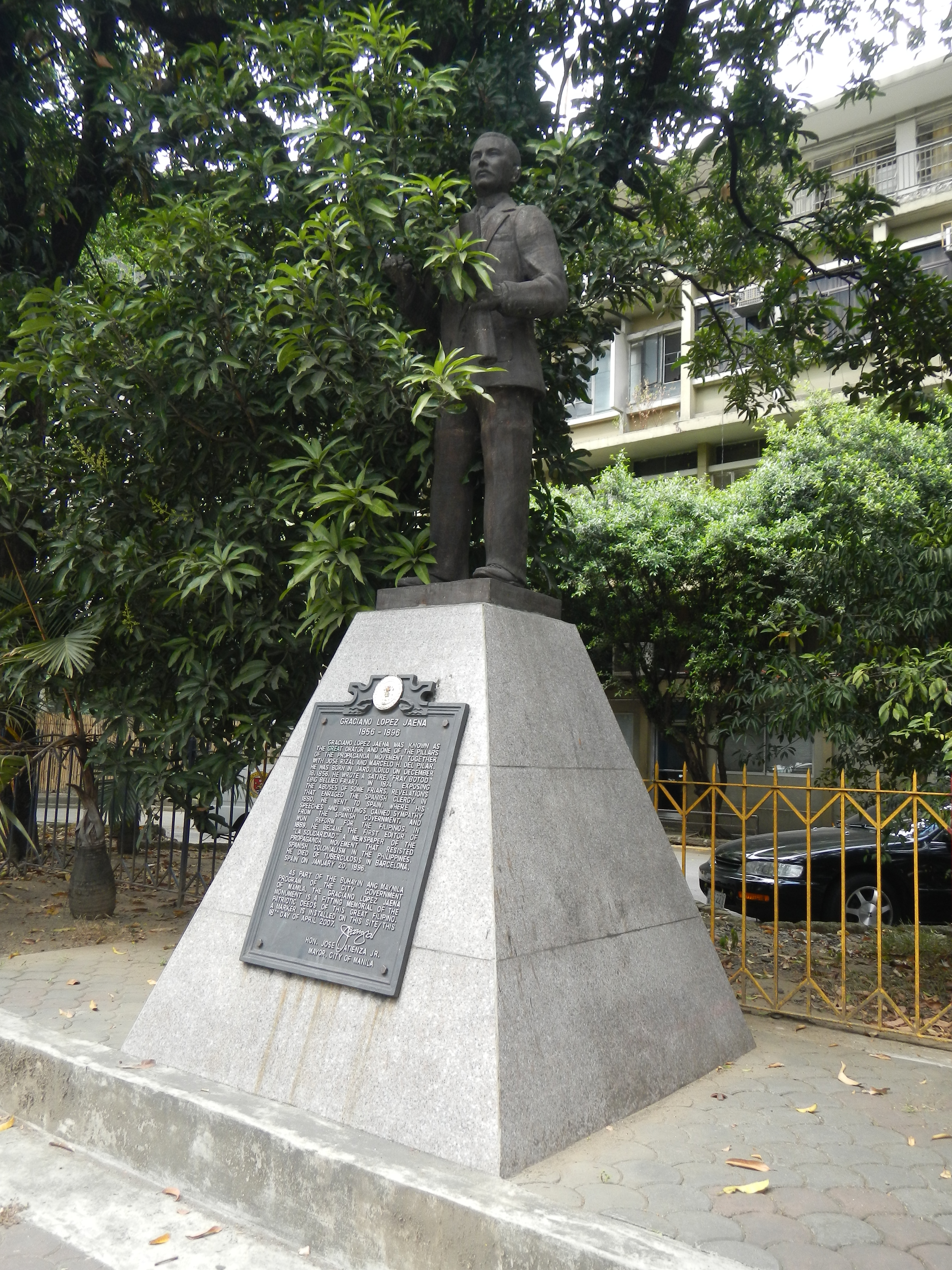
Monument, Intramuros, Manila

Graciano López-Jaena was born in Jaro, Iloilo, in the Captaincy General of the Philippines in the Spanish Empire on December 18, 1856. His parents were Plácido López and María Jacoba Jaena. He was baptized as "Graciano López y Jaena" on December 20, 1856, at Jaro Church by Plácido de Isana, and his godfather was Rufino Justiniano. Feeling that the priesthood was the most noble profession, his mother sent him to study at the St. Vincent Ferrer Seminary in Jaro. While there, he served as a secretary to his uncle, Claudio López, who was the honorary vice consul of Portugal in Iloilo.

Despite his mother wanting him to become a priest, López-Jaena's true ambition was to become a physician. After convincing his parents, he sought enrollment at the University of Santo Tomas but was denied admission because the required Bachelor of Arts degree was not offered at the seminary in Jaro. Instead, he was appointed to the San Juan de Dios Hospital as an apprentice. Due to financial problems, he dropped out and returned to Iloilo to practice medicine.

During this period, his visits with the poor began to stir feelings about the injustices that were common. At the age of 18 he wrote the satirical story Fray Botod, which depicted a fat and lecherous friar. Botod’s false piety "always had the Virgin and God on his lips no matter how unjust and underhanded his acts are." This incurred the fury of the friars. Although the story was not published, a copy circulated in Iloilo but the friars could not prove that López-Jaena was the author.

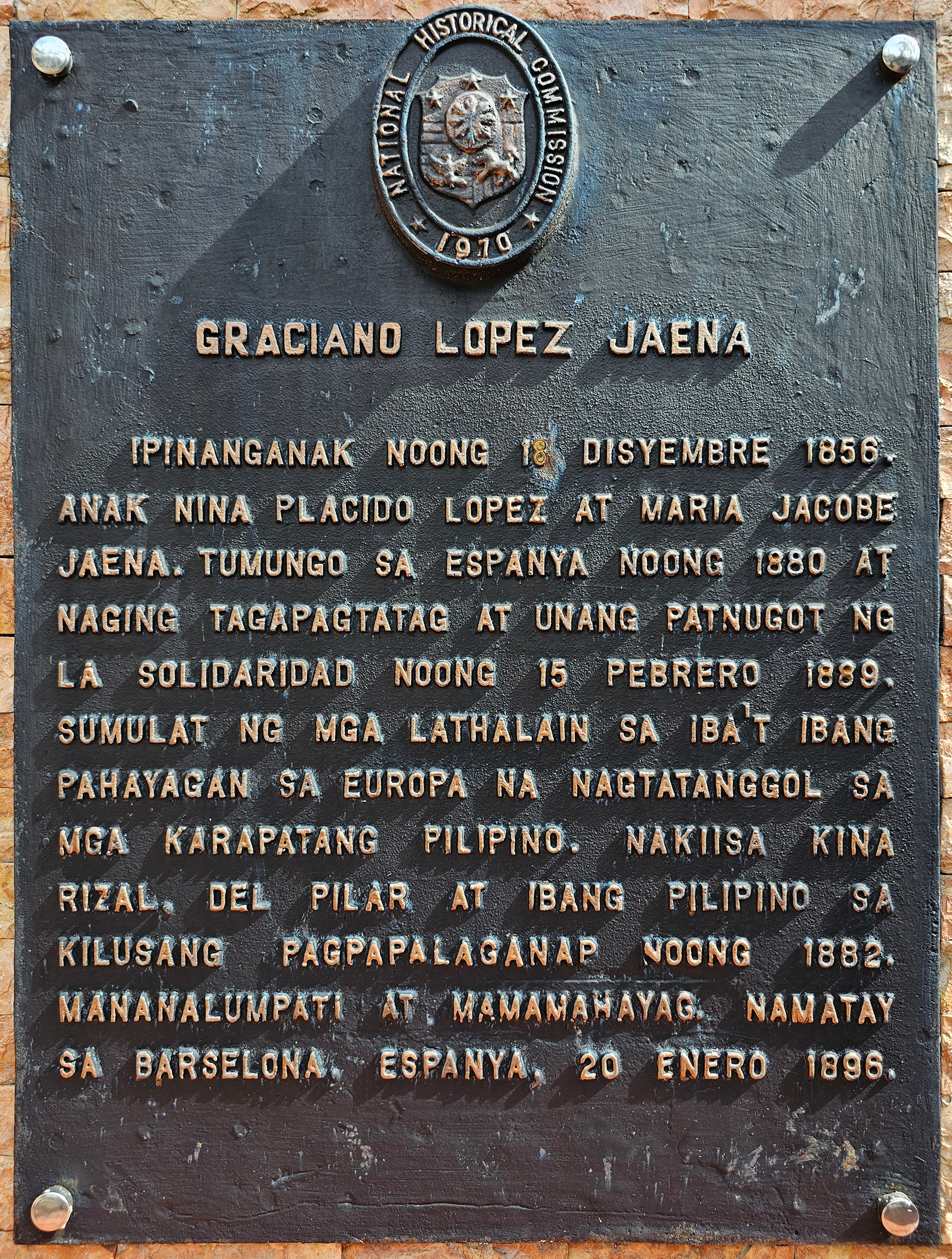
National historical marker installed in 1970 in Jaro, Iloilo

He got into trouble for refusing to testify that certain prisoners died of natural causes when it was obvious that they had died at the hands of the mayor of Pototan. López-Jaena continued to agitate for justice and finally went to Spain when threats were made to his life. López sailed for Spain in 1880. There he became a leading writer and speaker for Philippine reform.

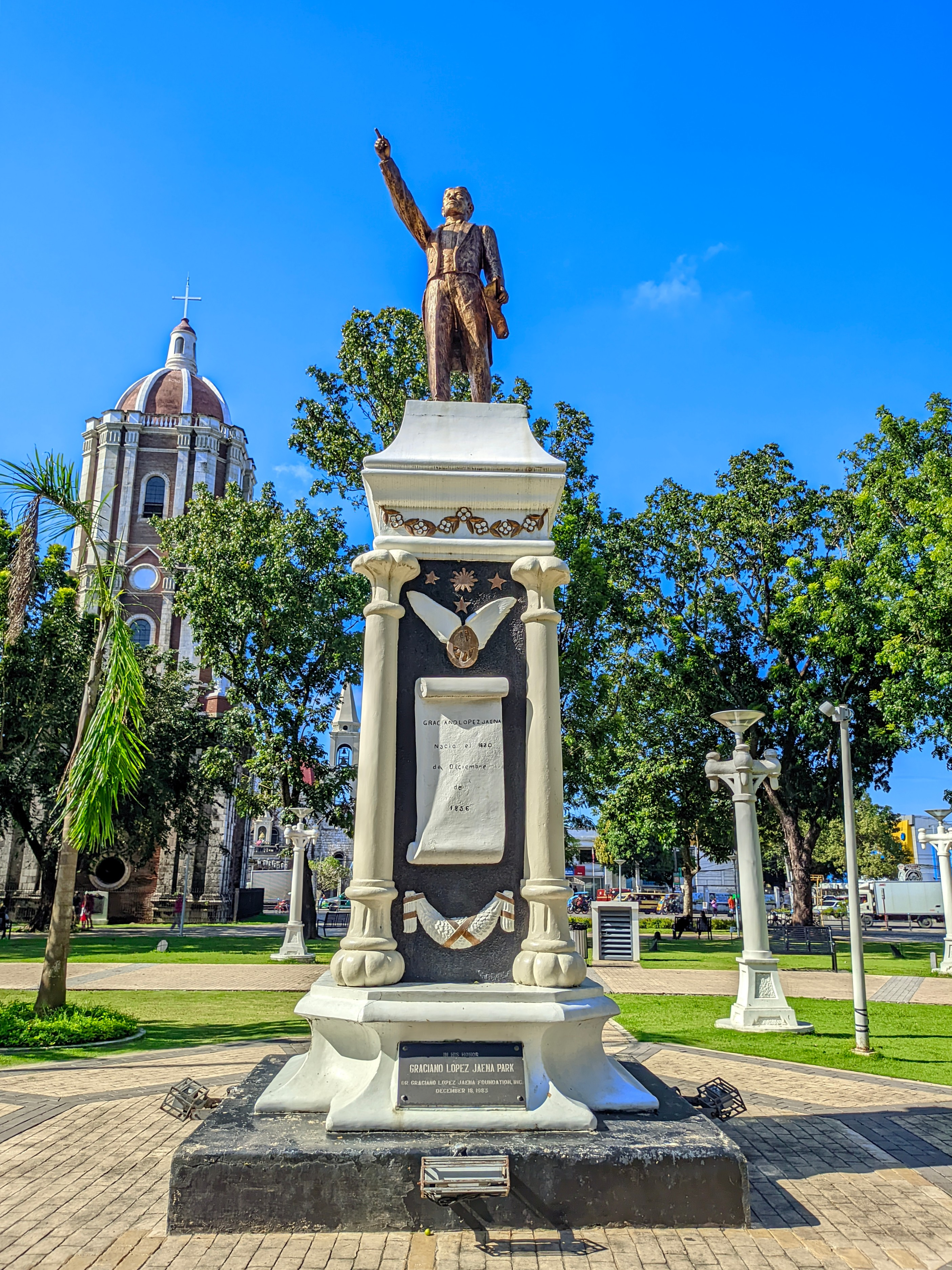
Statue of Graciano Lopez-Jaena in Plaza Jaro (Graciano Lopez-Jaena Park) in Iloilo City, his birthplace and hometown.

López Jaena pursued his medical studies at the University of Valencia, then transferred to Universidad Central in Madrid in 1881, but did not finish. Jose Alejandrino popularized an anecdote that Rizal once reproached Lopéz Jaena for not finishing his medical studies, to which Graciano replied, "On the shoulders of slaves should not rest a doctor's cape." Rizal countermanded, "The shoulders do not honor the doctor's cape, but the doctor's cape honors the shoulders," but recent research reveals this was most likely an Alejandrino concoction and not factual. Graciano's records instead indicate he was intent on finishing his studies, later on even enrolling at the Faculty of Law of the Universidad Central in 1884-1885. His financial difficulties, however, compounded by the cessation of support from the Philippines, made the completion of his degree extremely difficult.

In Madrid, Graciano joined the Filipino community and slowly built a reputation as an intellectual whose oratorical skills eventually earned him his reputation. His 1881 speech praising Fernando Leon y Castillo for the abolition of the tobacco monopoly in the Philippines was praised by the Madrid press, which gave him the opportunity to start a career in journalism. By 1883, he was writing for Los Dos Mundos, where articles such as "Una Protesta" defended Filipinos against racialized depictions and criticized colonial abuses.

Lopez-Jaena became especially known for his oratory. Mariano Ponce, another Filipino propagandists in Spain later recalled the audience's reaction to one of his speeches: "... a deafening ovation followed the close of the peroration, the ladies waved their kerchiefs wildly, and the men applauded frantically as they stood up from their seats in order to embrace the speaker." Rizal also noted López-Jaena's interests, writing: "His great love is politics and literature. I do not know for sure whether he loves politics in order to deliver speeches or he loves literature to be a politician."

López-Jaena he is remembered by the Filipino people for his literary contributions to the propaganda movement. López-Jaena founded the fortnightly newspaper, La Solidaridad. When the publication office moved from Barcelona to Madrid, the editorship was succeeded by Marcelo H. del Pilar. His talent can be seen in his book Discursos y Artículos Varios (Speeches and Various Articles) published in 1891.

López-Jaena died alone on his residence at Calle de Bot (Carrer d'en Bot) on January 20, 1896, in Barcelona, 11 months short of his 40th birthday. The following day, he was buried in a mass grave at the Montjuïc Cemetery of Barcelona. He died in poverty and his remains have not been brought back to the Philippines.

== Historiographical reassessment ==
Relying almost exclusively on anecdotes from Jose Alejandrino, later historians such as John Schumacher and writers such as Nick Joaquín and Resil Mojares portrayed López Jaena as brilliant but politically inconsistent. They often emphasized his bohemian habits, poverty, and unsettled life in Spain. The repeated negative portrayal helped create the persistent image of a Graciano Lopez Jaena as a supposed gambler and drunkard who frequented cafes and bars, picked his favorite Spanish sardines with his fingers, and wiped the oil on his collar. But more recent findings challenge this view, arguing that such portrayals relied on inherited anecdotes and class-based judgments. In Graciano’s Dirty Fingers, Emmanuel Lerona instead presents López Jaena’s journalism, Masonic ties, Spanish republicanism, and reformist work as part of his continuing advocacy for the Philippines.

== Public Holiday ==
December 18, Lopez Jaena's birthday, is a public holiday every year in Iloilo province and Iloilo City.

== Legacy ==
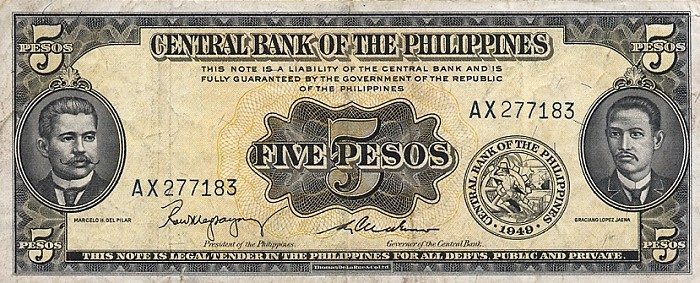
Marcelo H. del Pilar and Graciano Lopez Jaena appear on the obverse side of a 5 peso Philippine banknote circulated between 1951 and 1974.

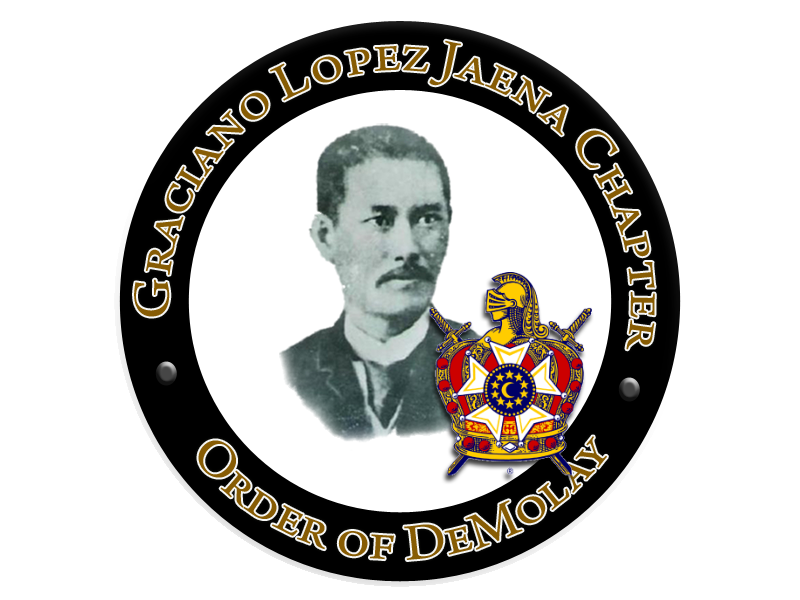
Order of DeMolay chapter seal.

In his honor, the Jaro Plaza was renamed the Graciano López Jaena Park, where there is also a statue of him.

The Graciano Lopez Jaena Foundation Inc works to continue his legacy and supports various public recognition of his life and work, such as the Dr. Graciano Lopez Jaena Poetry Contest.

The municipality of Lopez Jaena in Misamis Occidental is named after him.

An Order of DeMolay Chapter, a youth fraternal group for young men originating in freemasonry, was founded around 1965 in Jaro, and named Graciano Lopez-Jaena Chapter because Lopez Jaena was the first and foremost Freemason from Jaro.

Numerous streets throughout the Philippines are named after him in his honor.

== Notable works ==
- Filipinas en la Exposición Universal de Barcelona (The Philippines at the Universal Exposition of Barcelona)
- Fray Botod (Big-Bellied Friar)
- La Hija del Fraile (The Daughter of a Friar)
- Esperanzas (Hope)

== In popular culture ==
- Portrayed by Ricardo Cepeda in 1996 TV Series Bayani, in episode Graciano López-Jaena: Fray Botod (1874)
