= Nationalist Republican Left Party =

Nationalist Republican Left Party Partit Nacionalista Republicà d'Esquerra
- Abbreviation: PNRE
- Leader: Joan Lluhí i Vallescà
- General Secretary: Josep Tarradellas
- Founded: October 1933
- Dissolved: May 1936
- Split from: ERC
- Merged into: ERC
- Headquarters: Barcelona
- Newspaper: L'Opinió
- Youth wing: JERC
- Ideology: Social democracy; Catalan nationalism; Left-wing nationalism; Federalism

The Nationalist Republican Left Party (Catalan: Partit Nacionalista Republicà d'Esquerra, PNRE) was a Catalan political party founded in October 1933 as a result of a schism from the Republican Left of Catalonia (ERC). The party quickly rebuilt bridges with the ERC and entered the ERC-led government in 1934, as a result of which a number of prominent leaders were arrested and imprisoned following the events of 6th October 1934. The PNRE was ultimately reabsorbed into the ERC in February 1936.

Members of the party were known colloquially as lluhins (from the surname of party leader, Joan Lluhí), or panarres (a humorous adaptation of the initials of the party).

== Background ==
The founding group of the party included several government ministers for the ERC within the Generalitat de Catalunya, Joan Lluhí i Vallescà, Josep Tarradellas, Joan Casanelles i Ibars, Antoni Xirau i Palau and Carles Martí i Feced, as well as several other prominent ERC members. Together they were known as the L'Opinió group, after the socialist, republican and federalist Catalan-language newspaper of the same name, with which the members of the group were closely associated. The group aligned itself with the French Radical-Socialist tradition, combining this ideology with a Catalan nationalism that advocated for autonomy within a Spanish federalist framework. The group had key ideological divisions with the dominant Estat Català faction of the party (with whom the group had originally joined to form the ERC), with that faction seeking Catalan independence rather than federalism within a Spanish republic, and with the Estat Català not as ideologically left-wing as the L'Opinió group.

The group's members considered themselves faithful to the original ideals of the ERC, and were strongly critical of what they saw as the authoritarianism of Francesc Macià and of the "scandalous lack of discipline" of leaders and militants of the Estat Català faction. These criticisms laid the groundwork for their expulsion from the ERC.

== Expulsion from the ERC ==
The L'Opinió group's discontent was heightened when Macià rejected the proposal by the government of the Second Spanish Republic to name Tarradellas, one of their own, as the civil governor of Barcelona, instead preferring the nomination of Claudi Ametlla. Their rift with the Estat Català faction grew ever stronger, with Lluhí claiming on the eve of their expulsion that he feared that group would turn the ERC into an "antidemocratic, fascist and separatist" party. As a result of the L'Opinió group's constant critiques of the actions of the Estat Català faction and of the lack of internal democracy within the ERC, their condemnation of corruption cases, and their criticism of the ERC's performance of its duties both within the Catalan Parliament and the City Council of Barcelona, the group were ultimate expelled from the ERC in September 1933.

== Party formation and first election campaign ==
Following their expulsion from the ERC, the group held a constitutional assembly in Barcelona on 15th October 1933, inaugurating the PNRE as a new party. They were also able to form their own youth wing led by Josep Maria Lladó i Figueras, Alfred Cabanes, Rafael Font Farran, and Ferran Ludevid i Celestí Morlans, breaking with Joventuts d'Esquerra Republicana-Estat Català (JEREC), the ERC's own youth wing which was led at the time by Josep Dencàs and Miquel Badia, militants loyal to the Estat Català faction.

The calling of the 1933 Spanish general election for November of that year took the newly-formed PNRE by surprise, and they had little time to mount an effective electoral campaign. While the PNRE was able to field a prominent and experienced leadership team for the new party, they were unable to produce a charismatic leader who could compete with the ERC's Lluís Companys. It also proved impossible to unite the Catalan left in one electoral coalition, and the PNRE found themselves turning to more centrist parties.

As such, the PNRE participated in the 1933 election in coalition with the Partit Catalanista Republicà (PCR) and Acció Catalana Republicana (ACR) but failed to win a single seat, but they did manage to weaken the performance of the ERC's candidates at the election, which was itself an electoral goal for the nascent party. The death of Francesc Macià and the formation of Lluís Companys' new government of the Generalitat laid the ground for a new rapprochement with the ERC, and thus, in January 1934, Joan Lluhí entered the ERC-led Catalan government as Minister for Justice and Law.

== Government, events of 6 October and return to the ERC ==
The PNRE's participation in the short-lived Companys government was not without controversy, and the party was marked by internal division in the months leading up to the events of 6th October 1934. Despite the PNRE's anti-separatist position, Lluís reluctantly led the party to support the 6th October declaration of an independent Catalan State, particularly fearing that Catalan autonomy within Spain might be under threat following the 1933 election of a right-wing Spanish government. Lluís also claimed that he hoped the new Catalan State might be merely the beginning of a Spanish Republic, and that its declaration would help to promote a revolutionary anti-monarchist sentiment throughout Spain.

Following the events of 6th October, there was strong criticism and indeed repression of the Companys-led government in which the PNRE participated, albeit reluctantly. As a result, the publication of the PNRE-linked newspaper L'Opinió was suspended on account of its critical tone towards the right-wing government of the Spanish republic, and Tarradellas was detained together with several other leading figures of the party. Joan Lluhí himself was sentenced to life imprisonment and confined to the prison of El Puerto de Santa María, where he was imprisoned together with the ERC's Lluís Companys and the PSUC's Joan Comorera, although in May 1935 Lluhí was remanded to house arrest at his home in Barcelona, before eventually being pardoned by the new left-wing Spanish republican government of 1936.

At the 1936 Spanish general election, the PNRE formed part of the Front d'Esquerres electoral coalition, and achieved greater electoral success than the previous election, winning two seats in the Cortes Generales, despite the recent scandal. The party was formally reintegrated into the ERC in May 1936, although a faithful minority of the party's membership continued to use the name of the PNRE through to the end of the Spanish Civil War.
