= Tornabous =

- Municipality
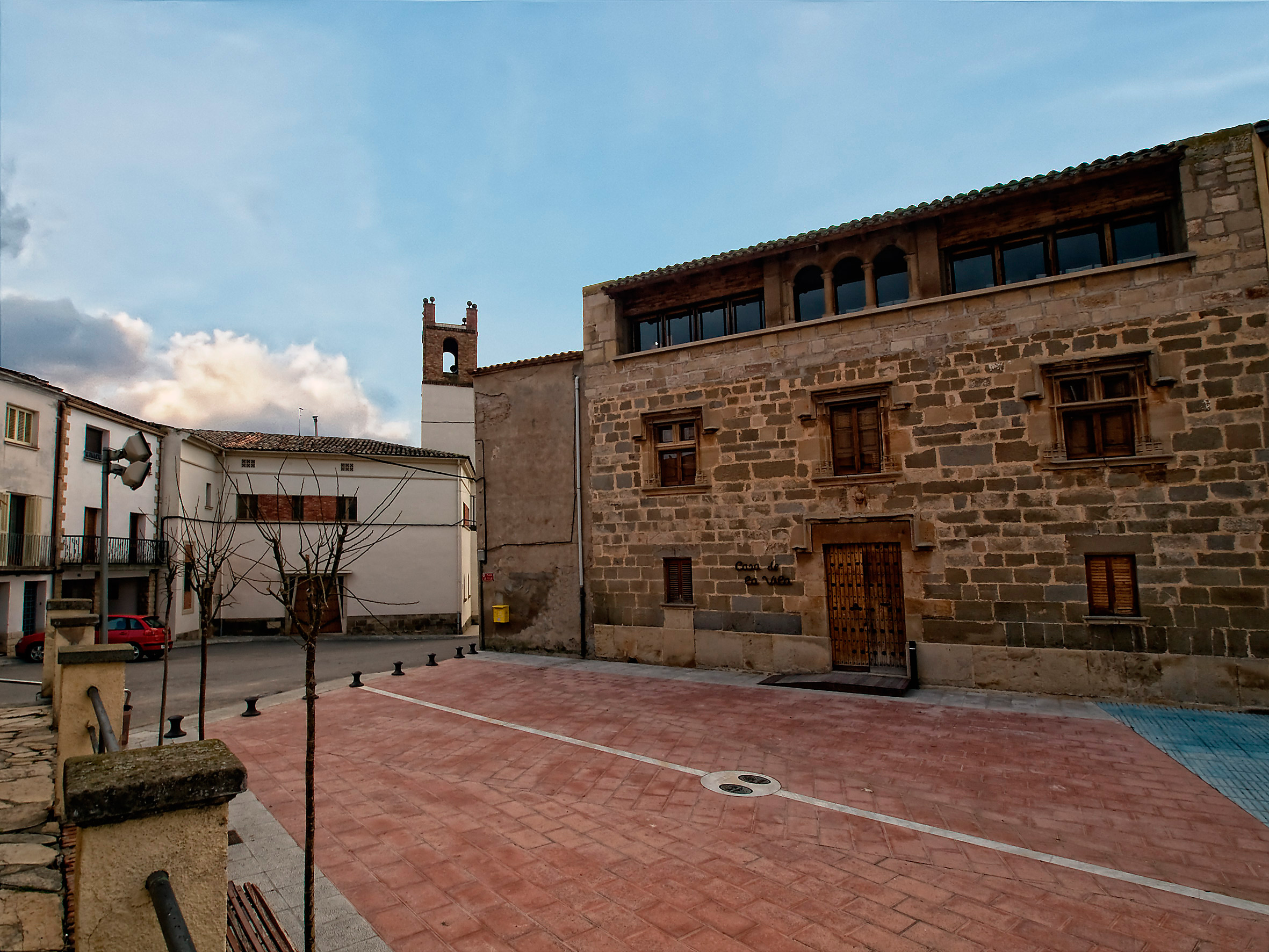
- Town Hall Square and the parish church

- Flag Coat of arms

- Location in Catalonia
- Coordinates: 41°42′N 1°3′E
- Country: Spain
- Community: Catalonia
- Province: Lleida
- Comarca: Urgell

Government
  - Mayor: David Vilaró Gordillo (Pv-AMUNT)

Area
  - Total: 24.2 km^{2} (9.3 sq mi)

Population (2025-01-01)
  - Total: 832
  - Density: 34.4/km^{2} (89.0/sq mi)
- Climate: Cfa
- Website: tornabous.cat

Tornabous (Catalan pronunciation: [ˌtoɾnaˈβows]) is a village and municipality in the province of Lleida and autonomous community of Catalonia, Spain. The municipality includes the village of El Tarròs, where there is an interpretive centre dedicated to Catalan patriot Lluís Companys, who was born there.

It has a population of 832 (register office, 2025).
