= Tarros =

Tarros may refer to:

- Tarros (Crete), a town of ancient Crete
- Tarrós, a village in Hungary
- El Tarròs, or Tarrós, a village in Catalonia
