= Francesc Layret =

Spanish nobel (1880 – 1920)

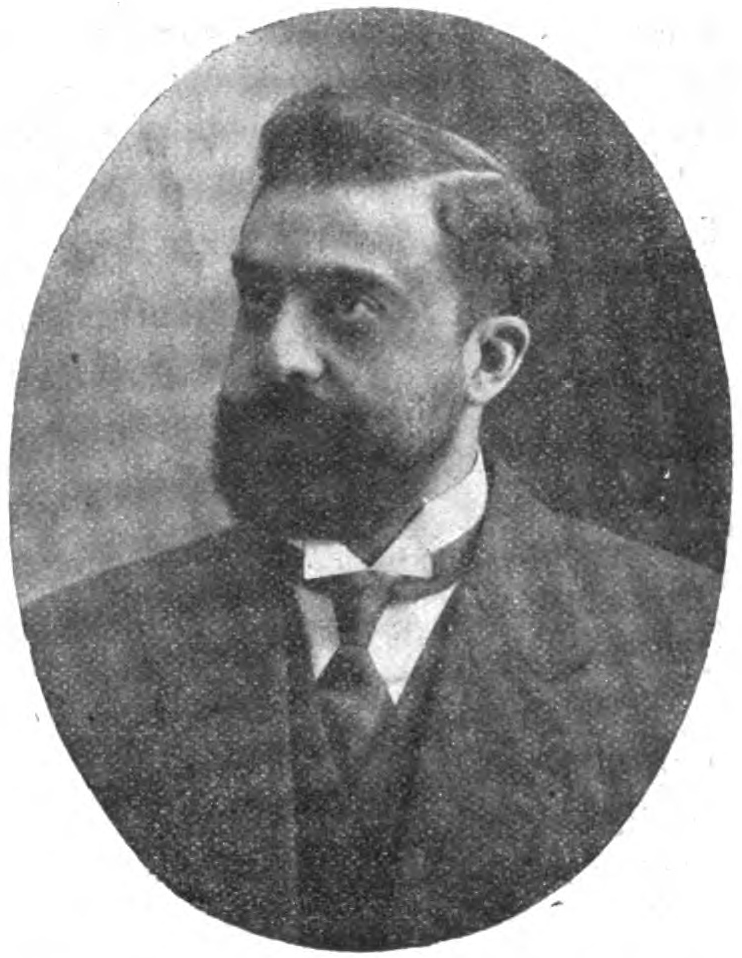
- Born: 10 July 1880; Barcelona
- Died: 30 November 1920 (aged 40); Barcelona
- Cause of death: Assassination
- Resting place: Cemetery of Montjuïc
- Occupations: Lawyer and politician

Francesc Layret i Foix (10 July 1880 in Barcelona – 30 November 1920 in Barcelona, Spain) was a Spanish politician and lawyer, Catalan nationalist and republican. He was assassinated in 1920 following the mass detention of several of his colleagues and other left-wing politicians and union leaders.

Layret was a democrat, republican, Catalan nationalist and defender of social justice. His commitment to the reality of his time and of Catalonia led him to collaborate with the working-class movement and the libertarian movement, helping to make Barcelona internationally known as the "rose of fire" for his role of avant-guard in the fight against oppression and exploitation.

== Biography ==
Francesc Layret was born in Barcelona on 10 July 1880. A paralysis as a child left him crippled for the rest of his life. A brilliant student, he studied for two university degrees at the same time, Law and Philosophy of Letters. He obtained his doctorate with the highest qualification in 1905.

In 1902 he was part of the group founding the Popular Encyclopedic Cultural Association, and presided over the first Organizing Commission and drawing up the first Statutes. He actively participated in the O.C. and later presided over it from 1906-1907. As a lawyer the union majority and that grouped the most combative workers participated in numerous processes of social character defending the workers, especially of the CNT.

Layret was elected town councilor of the Town Council of Barcelona for the Republican Union. He was appointed president of the Commission of Treasury and drew up and implemented the Budget of the Reform. With this budget he achieved a saving of two million pesetas with which in 1908 he prepared and defended the Budget of Culture for the creation of municipal schools offering modern, lay and mixed education. The Budget was passed by the Town Council, in spite of the opposition of the rightwing parties, but would finally not be implemented as it was vetoed by the Regional Government.

He participated in Solidaritat Catalana and, together with other dissidents from the Lliga Regionalista, in 1906 founded the Centre Nacionalista Republicà, which later joined the Unió Federal Nacionalista Republicana. In 1917 he was one of the founders of the Partit Republicà Català and in 1919 was elected deputy for Sabadell in the Cortes Generales in Madrid, in representation of this party.

Of his most noteworthy speeches in parliament is one in which he denounced the repressive situation that the Catalan proletariat were suffering after the strike of the manufacturer Canadenca in 1919 and another he gave in 1920, as a defender of peace at the presentation of the Budget of War.

== Assassination ==
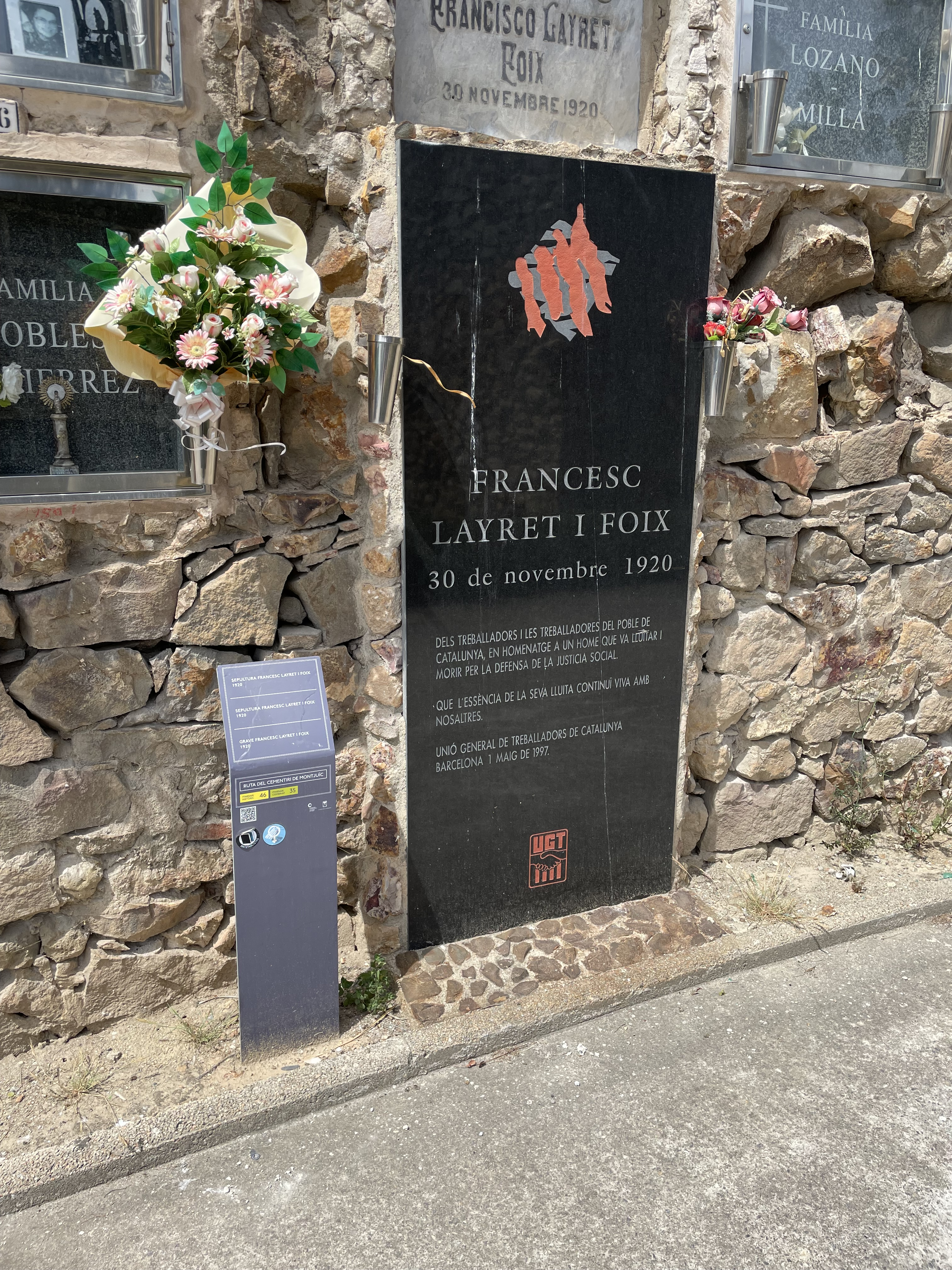
Gravestone of Francesc Layret

On 30 November 1920 Francesc Layret was assassinated by gunmen of the Catalan employers' Sindicato Libre. He was shot as he left home to go, as a deputy, to the Civil Government to protest against the mass detention of union leaders, nationalists and republicans, including his friends Lluis Companys and Martí Barrera. He was laid to rest on the Cemetery of Montjuïc.

== See also ==
- History of Catalonia
