= Víctor Gay Zaragoza =

Spanish writer and consultant

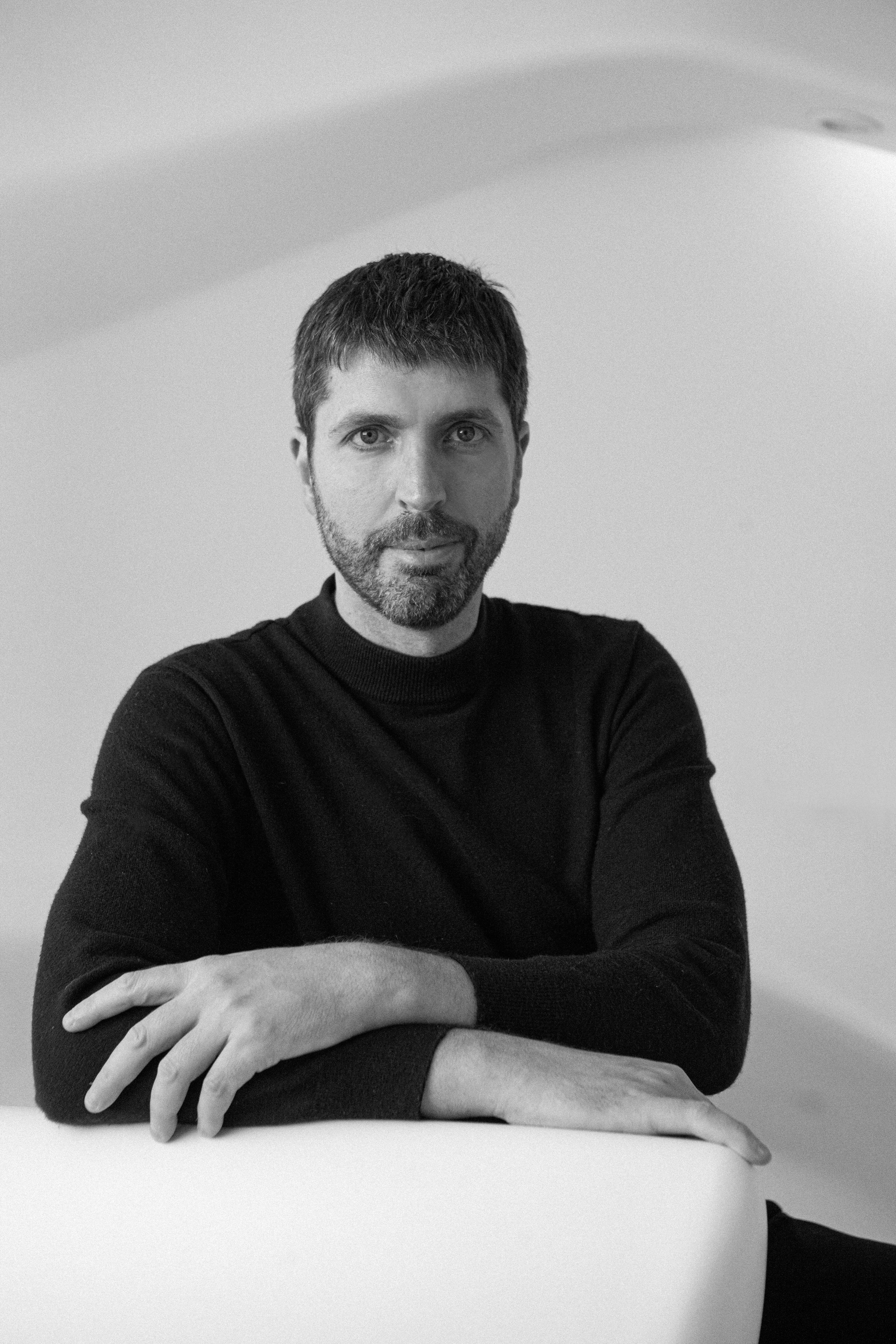
- Víctor Gay Zaragoza (2024)
- Born: June 19, 1982; Barcelona, Spain
- Occupations: Writer, professor, consultant

Víctor Gay Zaragoza (born 19 June 1982 in Barcelona, Spain) is a spanish writer, professor, and consultant specializing in storytelling and narrative strategy. He is an adjunct professor at IE Business School and director of the Storytelling Innovation Lab at IE University. He is the author of several books, including Filosofía Rebelde, 50 libros que cambiarán tu vida and the historical novel El Defensor.

== Career as a writer ==
Gay Zaragoza published his first book, Filosofía Rebelde (Editorial Kairós), in February 2011. The book is an essay that explores the shared foundations of different philosophical and religious traditions, with a particular focus on their implications for ethics, leadership and personal development under a global vision.

That same year, he published 50 libros que cambiarán tu vida (Alienta), a work of literary criticism and cultural analysis. In 2015, he published the historical novel El Defensor (Columna and Suma de Letras), set in 1940 during the trial and execution of the Catalan president Lluís Companys in the context of Nationalist Spain.

During the documentation process for the novel, Gay Zaragoza identified and documented a previously unknown family relationship between Lluís Companys and his military defence lawyer, Ramon de Colubí. The finding was subsequently reported and discussed by several media outlets and drew particular attention because Colubí had fought on the Nationalist side during the Spanish Civil War, while Companys was a Republican president.

This exploration of ethical tension, responsibility, and human decision-making beyond ideological divisions informed his later work.

In El Camino Amarillo: 7 pasos para tener éxito contando una historia (2021), Gay Zaragoza focused on the practical application of storytelling and narrative frameworks in professional and communication contexts. This line of inquiry was further developed in Revoluciona el algoritmo: cómo potenciar tu storytelling con inteligencia artificial (2025), where he examined the relationship between narrative, technology and human judgment in the context of artificial intelligence.

== Books ==
Gay Zaragoza has published several books on storytelling, philosophy, and narrative strategy, including:

- Filosofía Rebelde (2011).
- 50 libros que cambiarán tu vida (2011).
- El Defensor (historical novel, 2015).
- El Camino Amarillo: 7 pasos para tener éxito contando una historia (2017).
- Revoluciona el algoritmo: cómo potenciar tu storytelling con inteligencia artificial (2025).

== Articles ==
Gay Zaragoza has published articles in general-interest and specialized media, including National Geographic España, IE Insights and El País Retina:

- Gay Zaragoza, Víctor (2025). “Will artificial intelligence make us better? Only if we understand where humans win” – National Geographic España.
- Gay Zaragoza, Víctor (2025). “How data storytelling turns information into action” – IE Insights.
- Gay Zaragoza, Víctor (2025). “Storytelling with ChatGPT: where it helps and where it doesn’t” – IE Insights.
- Gay Zaragoza, Víctor & Miguel Alexandre Barreiro-Laredo (2025). “Between the Wild West and censorship: can we still save social networks?” – El País Retina.
- Gay Zaragoza, Víctor (2014). “Organizaciones coherentes: del lucro a la creación de riqueza” – Executive Excellence.
- Gay Zaragoza, Víctor (2015). “Let’s be authentic rebels!” – Executive Excellence.
- Gay Zaragoza, Víctor (2015). “La valentía de liderar(nos)” – RRHH Digital.

== Awards and recognitions ==
- Finalist for Best Article of the Year Award, RRHH Digital.
- Award for the training program with the greatest practical application, Foro RRHH (Foment del Treball).
- Two Academic Excellence Awards from IE University for teaching during the 2022–2023 academic year.
- Six Academic Excellence Awards from IE University for teaching during the 2023–2024 academic year.
- Seven Academic Excellence Awards from IE University for teaching during the 2024–2025 academic year.
