= Fossar de la Pedrera =

Memorial in Barcelona

Coordinates: 41°21′22″N 2°8′55″E

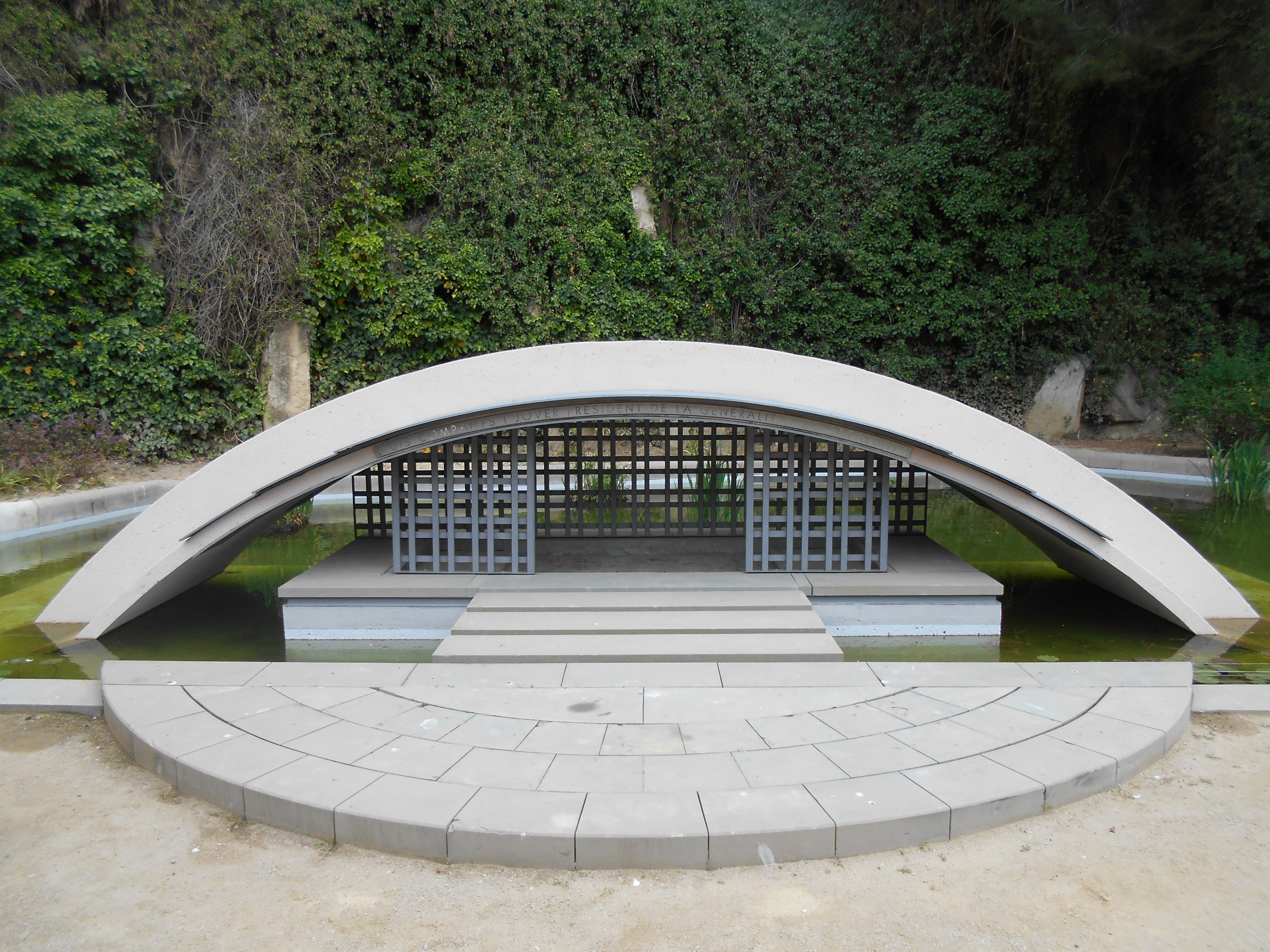
Lluís Companys' tomb at the Fossar de la Pedrera.

The Fossar de la Pedrera (lit. Cemetery of the Quarry) is located on Montjuïc hill in the Sants-Montjuïc district of Barcelona. Forming part of the Montjuïc Cemetery, it was used as a mass grave for 4,000 victims of Spain's White Terror. There is now a memorial on the site.

Since 1985, the area also houses the remains of Lluís Companys, the 123rd President of Catalonia, who was executed nearby at the Montjuïc Castle by the Francoist government on 15 October 1940. His death is commemorated annually by Catalan politicians and civilians, who lay a wreath in memory of the president.

== History ==
In 1985, a memorial designed by architects Beth Galí, Marius Quintana, and Pere Casajoana was opened, comprising a set of columns with the names of the victims, a large garden with tombstones, and the mausoleum of Lluís Companys. The inscriptions on the entrance were written by Maria Aurelia Capmany: one refers to the victims of repression, another to victims of fortune. The term "victims of fortune" likely refers to those who suffered and died due to the chaotic and unpredictable nature of war and its aftermath, whether they had been buried there as well or not. The memorial was inaugurated on 27 October 1985 by President Jordi Pujol, the mayor of Barcelona Pasqual Maragall, and relatives of Lluís Companys.

There are also a number of other memorials on the site, including a tribute to the victims of National Socialism opened on the fiftieth anniversary of the end of World War II, a bronze figure in memory of all those executed by the Francoist government, and a memorial to CNT members who died during the civil war.
