= Bernardo Giner de los Ríos =

Spanish politician

Bernardo Giner de los Ríos (1888, Málaga - 1970) was a Spanish architect, politician, and writer of architectural books. He built a number of buildings in and around Madrid, including many schools.

== Background ==
The son of Hermenegildo Giner de los Ríos and Laura García Hoppe, Bernardo Giner de los Ríos was born into a family of intellectuals and progressive politicians. His uncle, Francisco Giner de los Ríos, was a philosopher and proponent of the ideas of Karl Christian Friedrich Krause. Francisco Giner de los Ríos translated selections from Krause's aesthetic writings in 1874 as Compendio de Estética. Francisco and Hermenegildo Giner de los Ríos also founded the freethinking Institución Libre de Enseñanza in 1876.

== Career ==
=== Architecture ===
Beginning his career in the 1920s, Bernardo Giner de los Ríos specialised in the construction of schools, serving as a school inspector for the Spanish province of Levante, around Alicante, and built many schools in Madrid. During the Spanish Civil War, from 1936 to 1939, he served as the Minister of Communications, Transport and Public Works for the Republican government. After the war, he spent a year in Santo Domingo before moving to Mexico in 1940, where he developed an active career. From 1945 to 1960 he served as General Secretary of the Presidency of the Republic in exile. He spent the years 1946-1949 in Paris in this role before returning to Mexico, where he died in 1970.

=== Writings ===
In Mexico City in 1952, Giner de los Ríos published 50 Años de Arquitectura Española (1900-1950) ("50 Years of Spanish Architecture"), a history of Spanish architecture in the 20th century that had grown out of a talk that he gave at the Ateneo Español de México in August 1951.

Although he assumed an objective voice and omitted a political discussion of architecture from this book, Giner de los Ríos' point of view is important given his political activity and his family's history with the Institución Libre de Enseñanza. The book adopted a progressive, but technocratic view of modernization and focused on the role of school construction and municipal urban design achievements in Spanish architecture.

Open minded about aesthetics, Giner de los Ríos himself built schools in the modern Madrileño compromise style typical of the younger generation of architects, red-brick with strip windows and moldings of simplified section, like many 1930s buildings at the new University City of Madrid (Ciudad Universitaria). However, Giner's book for the most part set aside politics and matters of architectural style to focus on technical advances and planning successes. This approach emphasize the continuity of architectural thinking through a period of rapidly changing political regimes and projects.

From 1961 to 1970, the Boletín de la Institución Libre de Enseñanza resumed publication (it had stopped in 1936) in Mexico under his direction. Publication resumed in Madrid in 1977, after the Institución was legalized in Spain.
