= Montjuïc Cemetery =

Cemetery in Barcelona, Spain

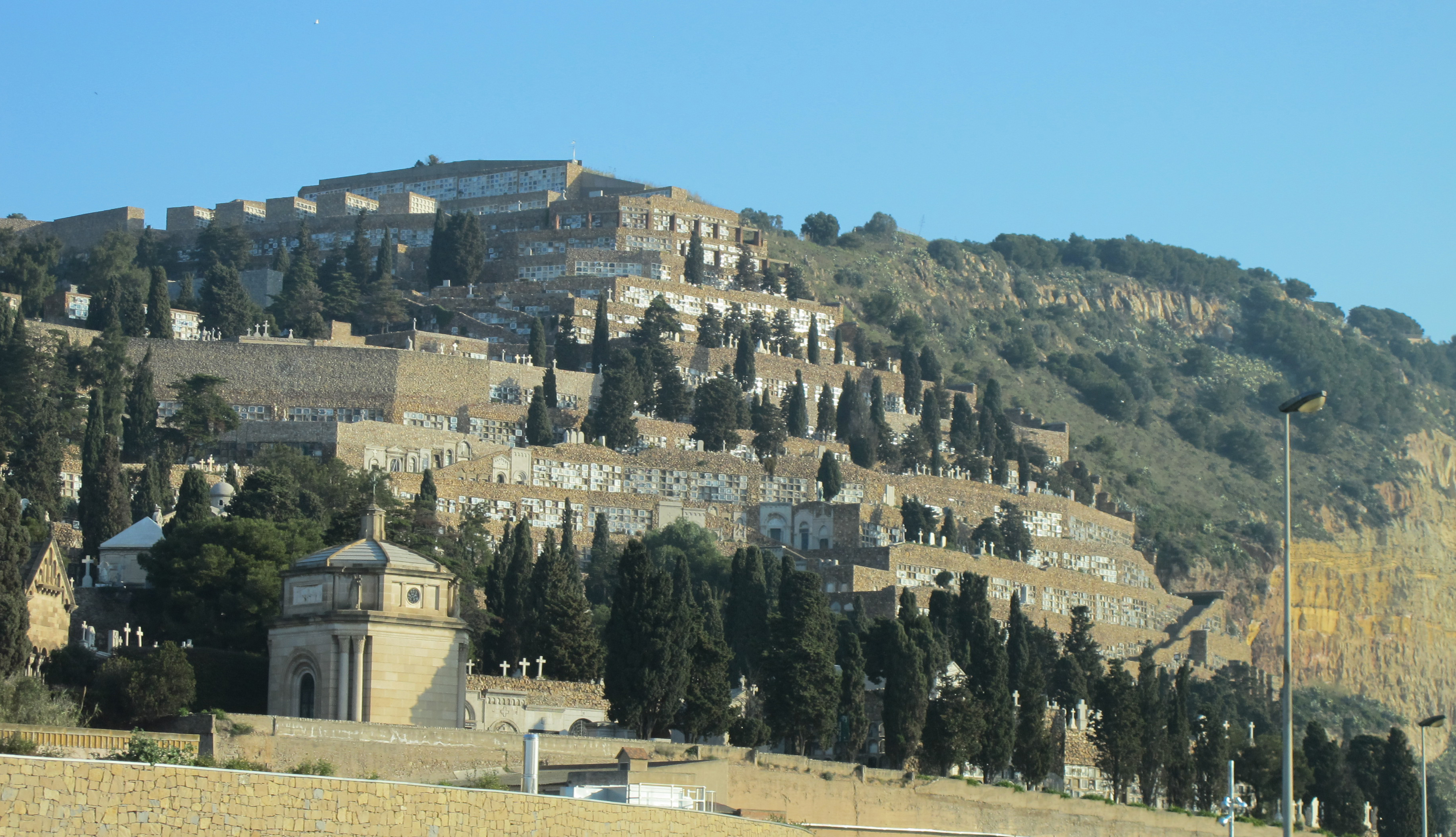
- Montjuïc Cemetery, panoramic view
- Interactive map of Montjuïc Cemetery

Details
- Established: 1883
- Location: Barcelona
- Country: Spain
- Coordinates: 41.353889°N 2.155556°E
- Type: Public
- Owned by: Cementiris de Barcelona S.A.
- Size: 57 acres (23 ha)
- No. of graves: 150,000+
- No. of interments: 1,000,000+

Montjuïc Cemetery, known in Catalan as Cementiri del Sud-oest or Cementiri de Montjuïc, is located on one of the rocky slopes of Montjuïc hill in Barcelona, Spain.

== History ==
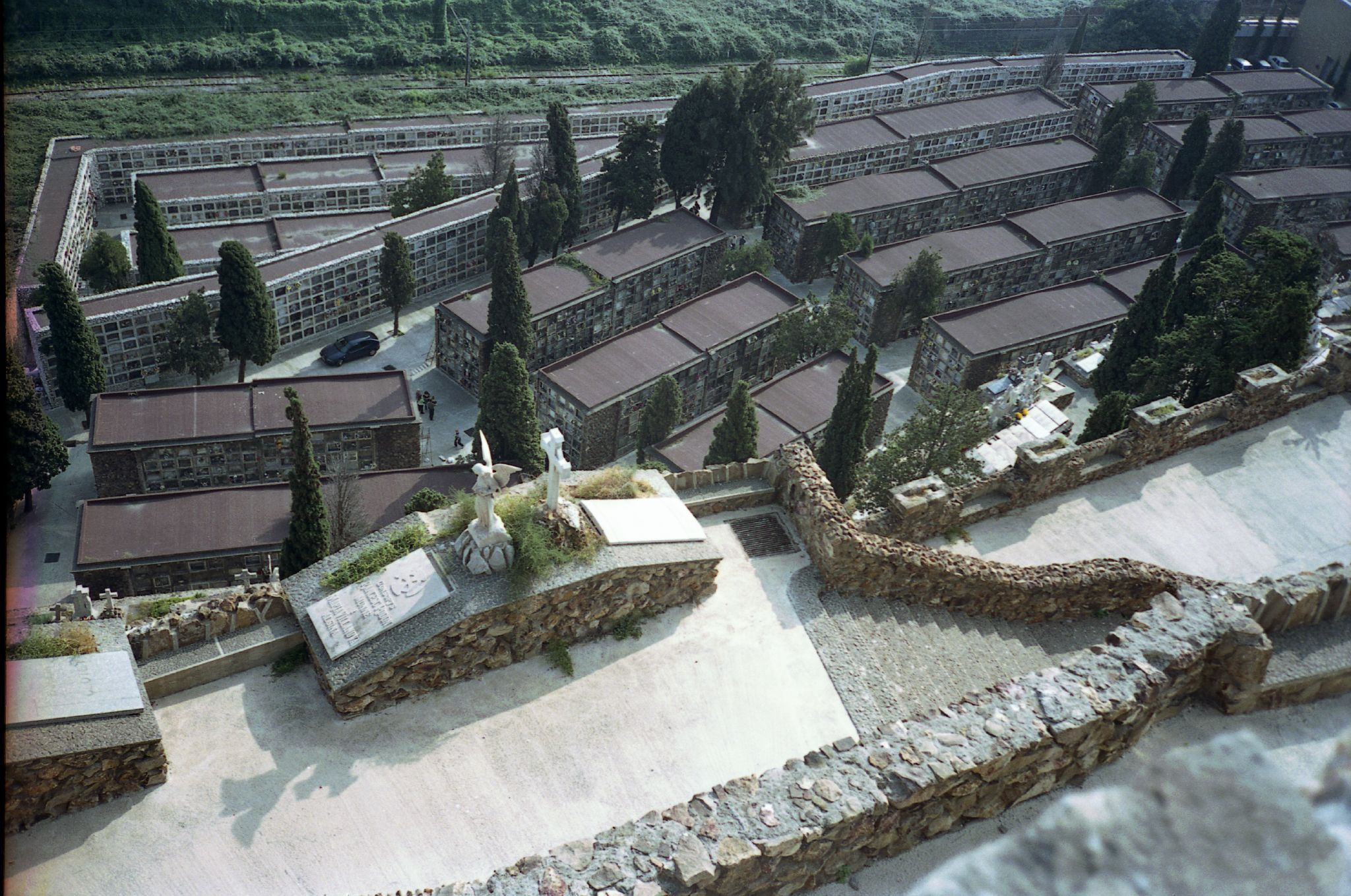
Montjuïc Cemetery, view from the top

It was opened on 17 March 1883 by the city of Barcelona as its main cemetery, supplanting the older cemetery at Poblenou in the east. It now contains over one million burials and cremation ashes in 150,000 plots, niches and mausolea and is operated by Cementiris de Barcelona S.A.

The city became heavily industrialised during the 19th century and its economic growth led Barcelona becoming the centre of Catalonia and a major city of Spain. The growth in population led to an increased demand for burial facilities, and a location was chosen on the slopes of Montjuïc, away from the pressures of housing development. The steep slopes of the hillside give Montjuïc its special character, with winding paths and terraced niches looking seawards over the harbour.

The cemetery contains one Commonwealth war grave, British Army Private Charles Hill (d. 1941) of the Queen's Own Cameron Highlanders who died during World War II.

== Monument design ==
The timing of the cemetery and its memorials coincided with several artistic and design movements; its early monuments are inspired by classic and Gothic styles, while those of the Fin de siècle exhibit the influence of the Art-Nouveau design movement. In Catalonia that style developed into Modernisme, as it was known in Catalan.

== Notable interments ==
- Isaac Albéniz (1860–1909), virtuoso pianist, composer, and conductor
- Victoria de los Ángeles (1923–2005), operatic lyric soprano and recitalist
- Jacint Verdaguer (1845–1902) writer, regarded as one of the greatest poets of Catalan literature and a prominent literary figure of the Renaixença, a cultural revival movement of the late Romantic era
- Francisco Ascaso (1901–1936), anarchist
- Hans Beimler (1895–1936), active member of the German Communist Party and a deputy in the Reichstag
- Joaquín Blume (1933–1959), gymnast
- Francesc Cambó (1876–1947), politician, founder and leader of the autonomist party Lliga Regionalista
- Josep Carner (1884–1970), poet, journalist, playwright and translator
- Ramon Casas (1866–1932), artist
- Ildefons Cerdà (1815–1876), architect who designed the 19th-century "extension" of Barcelona called the Eixample
- Lluís Companys (1882–1940), President of Catalonia from 1934 and during the Spanish Civil War
- Buenaventura Durruti (1896–1936), anarchist revolutionary in the Spanish Civil War
- Antonio Escobar (1879–1940), Army general
- Josep Lluís Facerías (1920–1957), politician
- Jaume Ferran i Clua (1851–1929), microbiologist
- Francesc Ferrer i Guàrdia (1859–1909), anarchist pedagogue
- Joan Gamper (1877–1930), Swiss football pioneer, versatile athlete and club president
- Àngel Guimerà (1845–1924), writer
- Francesc Layret (1880–1920), politician
- Anselmo Lorenzo (1841–1914), politician and anarchist
- Francesc Macià (1859–1933), First President of Catalonia and formerly an officer in the Spanish Army
- Pascual Madoz (1806–1870), politician, statistician
- Enriqueta Martí (1868–1913), Spanish child serial killer, kidnapper, and procuress of children
- Ana María Matute (1925–2014), writer
- Raquel Meller (1888–1962), diseuse, cuplé, and tonadilla singer and actress
- Lluís Millet (1867–1941), composer, musician and co-founder of Orfeó Català
- Joan Miró (1893–1983), artist
- Federico Mompou (1893–1987), composer and pianist
- Joan Salvat-Papasseit (1894–1924), poet
- Ángel Pestaña (1886–1937), politician
- Marcelo H. del Pilar (1850–1896), Filipino propagandist and writer. His remains were exhumed and returned to the Philippines on 3 December 1920.
- José María de Porcioles (1904–1993), mayor of Barcelona, Catalonia
- Enric Prat de la Riba (1870–1917), politician
- Salvador Puig Antich (1948–1974), revolutionary, militant anarchist
- Francisco de Paula Rius y Taulet (1833–1890), politician, mayor of Barcelona in four different non-consecutive periods during the Restoration
- Montserrat Roig (1946–1991), writer
- Constantino Romero (1947–2013), TV and radio host and actor
- Carlos Ruiz Zafón (1964–2020), novelist
- Santiago Rusiñol (1861–1931), painter, poet, and playwright
- Josep Maria de Sagarra (1894–1961), writer
- Juan Antonio Samaranch (1920–2010), IOC President from 1980 to 2001
- Salvador Seguí Rubinat (1887–1923), anarchist
- Jacint Verdaguer (1845–1902), writer, poet
- Ricardo Zamora (1901–1978), Spanish footballer
- Graciano López Jaena (1856–1896), Filipino Orator, Journalist, reformist and Hero

== See also ==
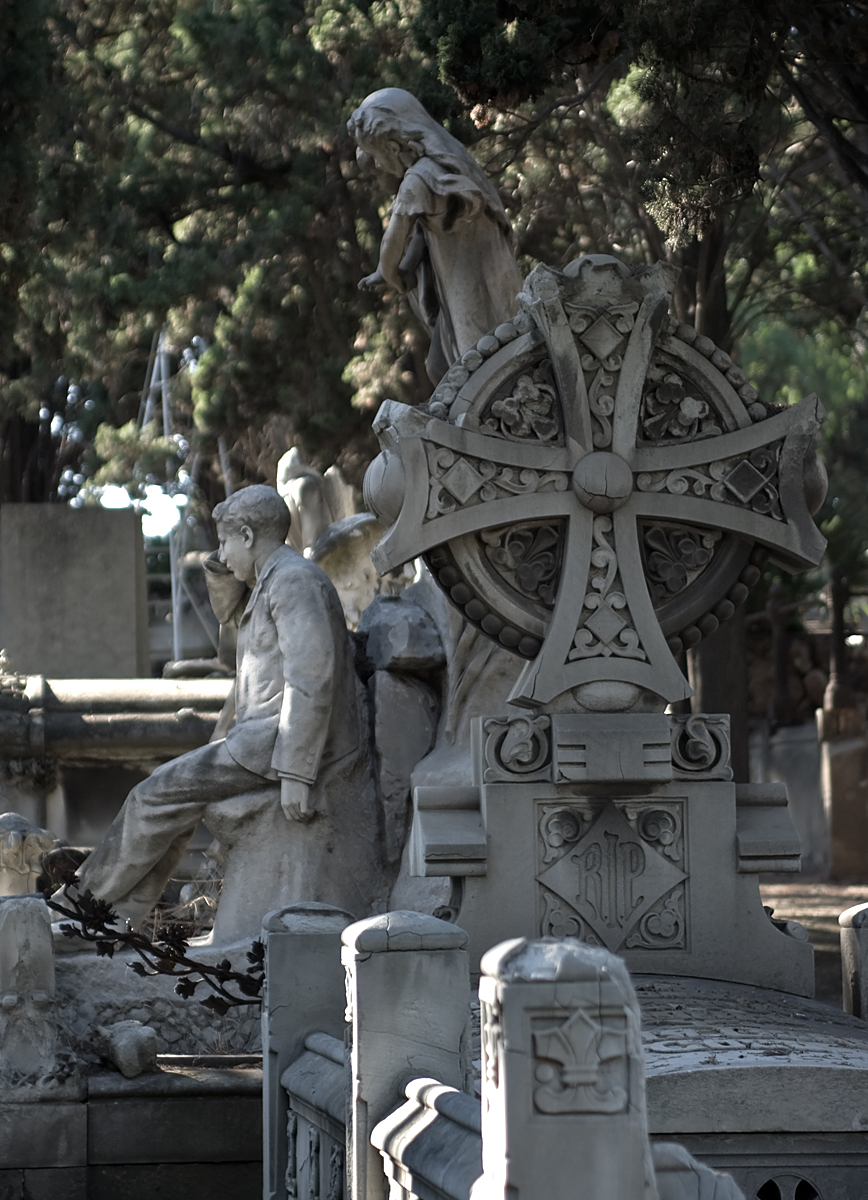
Montjuïc Cemetery

- Burials at Montjuïc Cemetery
- Poblenou Cemetery
- List of burial places of classical musicians
