= Ministry of Communications (Spain) =

- Ministerio de Comunicaciones

Agency overview
- Formed: April 15, 1931
- Preceding agency: Ministry of Home Affairs
- Dissolved: March 6, 1939
- Superseding agency: Ministry of Public Works and Communications
- Type: Ministry
- Jurisdiction: Government of Spain

The Ministry of Communications was a department of the Government of Spain active during the Second Republic and the Civil War. Originally, this ministry had powers on the postal service, telegraphs, telephone and radiocommunications. During the first years of the republic its powers gradually saw growth, assuming competences on aeronautics, navigation and air transport. Subsequently, in closer times to the civil war, the department assumed powers over the merchant marine and other transports.

== History ==
The Ministry of Communications is a unique department of the Second Spanish Republic. It has been not use in any other time. It was created on 15 April 1931, a day after the proclamation of the republic, and it assumed the powers of the Directorate-General for the Postal Service and Telegraphs of the Ministry of Home Affairs. From this ministry also assumed the competences relating the link between the Government and the Compañía Telefónica Nacional de España. Diego Martínez Barrio was the first minister.

Months later, in December 1931, minister Martínez Barrio left the portfolio and Santiago Casares Quiroga, Minister of Home Affairs, assumed the office temporarily until April 1932 when the Department was abolished and the Undersecretariat of Communications (main department of the Ministry) was transferred to the Ministry led by Casares Quiroga. The Department of Communications was recreated in 1933 with Miquel Santaló i Parvorell as its minister.

The Ministry merged in September 1935 with the Ministry of Public Works under the premiership of Joaquín Chapaprieta until February 1936. Briefly that year, under the premierships of Manuel Azaña, Augusto Barcía Trelles, Santiago Casares Quiroga, Diego Martínez Barrio and José Giral, both departments split again and ministry was renamed Ministry of Communications and Merchant Marine. In September that year, the ministry was renamed just Ministry of Communications and two months later it was renamed again "of Communications and Merchant Marine". In May 1937, it was merged again with Public Works.

In April 1938, the ministries were split again and the Communications one assumed powers on transports, being renamed as Ministry of Communications and Transport until March 1939 when it was merged again with Public Works. After the end of the Civil War in April 1939, the dictator Franco did not use this department and the communications powers were part of the Ministry of Home Affairs during all the dictatorship.

During the last cabinets of Adolfo Suárez, the government of Calvo-Sotelo and the first cabinets of Felipe González, the powers were assumed by the Ministry of Transport until 1991, when they were transferred to the Ministry of Public Works and nowadays they remain in this ministry. However, the powers relating to telecommunications are in the Ministry of Economy.

== List of ministers ==
Name	Term		Duration	Party	Government		Ref.
Diego Martínez Barrio (Note: During the absences of the Minister: Gerardo Abad Conde, Under-Secretary (7–12 May 1931 and 5–15 June 1931). From 5 to 15 June 1931 Niceto Alcalá-Zamora, Prime Minister, served as Acting Minister of Communications, although the Ministry's Under-Secretary assumed the ordinary discharge of duties.) (1883–1962)	15 April 1931	16 December 1931	245 days	Radical Republican	Niceto Alcalá-Zamora	Niceto Alcalá-Zamora (1931–1936)	
Diego Martínez Barrio (1883–1962)	15 April 1931	16 December 1931	245 days	Radical Republican	Manuel Azaña	Niceto Alcalá-Zamora (1931–1936)	
Santiago Casares Quiroga (1884–1950) acting minister	17 December 1931	31 March 1932	105 days	ORGA	Manuel Azaña	Niceto Alcalá-Zamora (1931–1936)	
Office disestablished during this interval. (Note: The department's competences were transferred to the Ministry of the Governance.)						Niceto Alcalá-Zamora (1931–1936)	
Miquel Santaló (1888–1961)	12 September 1933	8 October 1933	26 days	Catalan Republican Left	Alejandro Lerroux	Niceto Alcalá-Zamora (1931–1936)	
Emilio Palomo Aguado (1898–1964)	8 October 1933	16 December 1933	69 days	Radical Republican	Diego Martínez Barrio	Niceto Alcalá-Zamora (1931–1936)	
José María Cid Ruiz-Zorrilla (1882–1956)	16 December 1933	4 October 1934	292 days	Radical Republican	Alejandro Lerroux	Niceto Alcalá-Zamora (1931–1936)	
José María Cid Ruiz-Zorrilla (1882–1956)	16 December 1933	4 October 1934	292 days	Radical Republican	Ricardo Samper	Niceto Alcalá-Zamora (1931–1936)	
César Jalón Aragón (1889–1985)	4 October 1934	6 May 1935	128 days	Radical Republican	Alejandro Lerroux	Niceto Alcalá-Zamora (1931–1936)	
Luis Lucía Lucía (1888–1943)	6 May 1935	25 September 1935	142 days	CEDA	Alejandro Lerroux	Niceto Alcalá-Zamora (1931–1936)	
Office disestablished during this interval. (Note: The department's competences were transferred to the Ministry of Public Works and Communications.)						Niceto Alcalá-Zamora (1931–1936)	
Manuel Blasco Garzón (1885–1954)	19 February 1936	13 May 1936	84 days	Republican Unionist	Manuel Azaña	Niceto Alcalá-Zamora (1931–1936)	
Manuel Blasco Garzón (1885–1954)	19 February 1936	13 May 1936	84 days	Republican Unionist	Augusto Barcia Trelles (Note: Acting prime minister from 10 to 13 May 1936)	Manuel Azaña (1936–1939)	
Bernardo Giner de los Ríos (1888–1970)	13 May 1936	19 July 1936	67 days	Republican Unionist	Santiago Casares Quiroga	Manuel Azaña (1936–1939)	
Joan Lluhí (1897–1944)	19 July 1936	19 July 1936	0 days	Catalan Republican Left	Diego Martínez Barrio	Manuel Azaña (1936–1939)	
Start of the Spanish Civil War						Manuel Azaña (1936–1939)	
Bernardo Giner de los Ríos (1888–1970)	19 July 1936	4 September 1936	47 days	Republican Unionist	José Giral	Manuel Azaña (1936–1939)	
Bernardo Giner de los Ríos (1888–1970)	19 July 1936	4 September 1936	47 days	Republican Unionist	Francisco Largo Caballero	Manuel Azaña (1936–1939)	
Office disestablished during this interval. (Note: The department's competences were transferred to the Ministry of Communications, Transports and Public Works.)						Manuel Azaña (1936–1939)	
Bernardo Giner de los Ríos (Note: During the absences of the Minister: Juan Negrín, Prime Minister (21–30 November 1938).) (1888–1970)	5 April 1938	5 March 1939	334 days	Republican Unionist	Juan Negrín	Manuel Azaña (1936–1939)	
Office permanently abolished. (Note: After the end of the Civil War, the Francoist government merged the communication powers into the Ministry of the Governance.)
