= El Tarròs =

Coordinates: 41°42′26.15″N 1°1′59″E

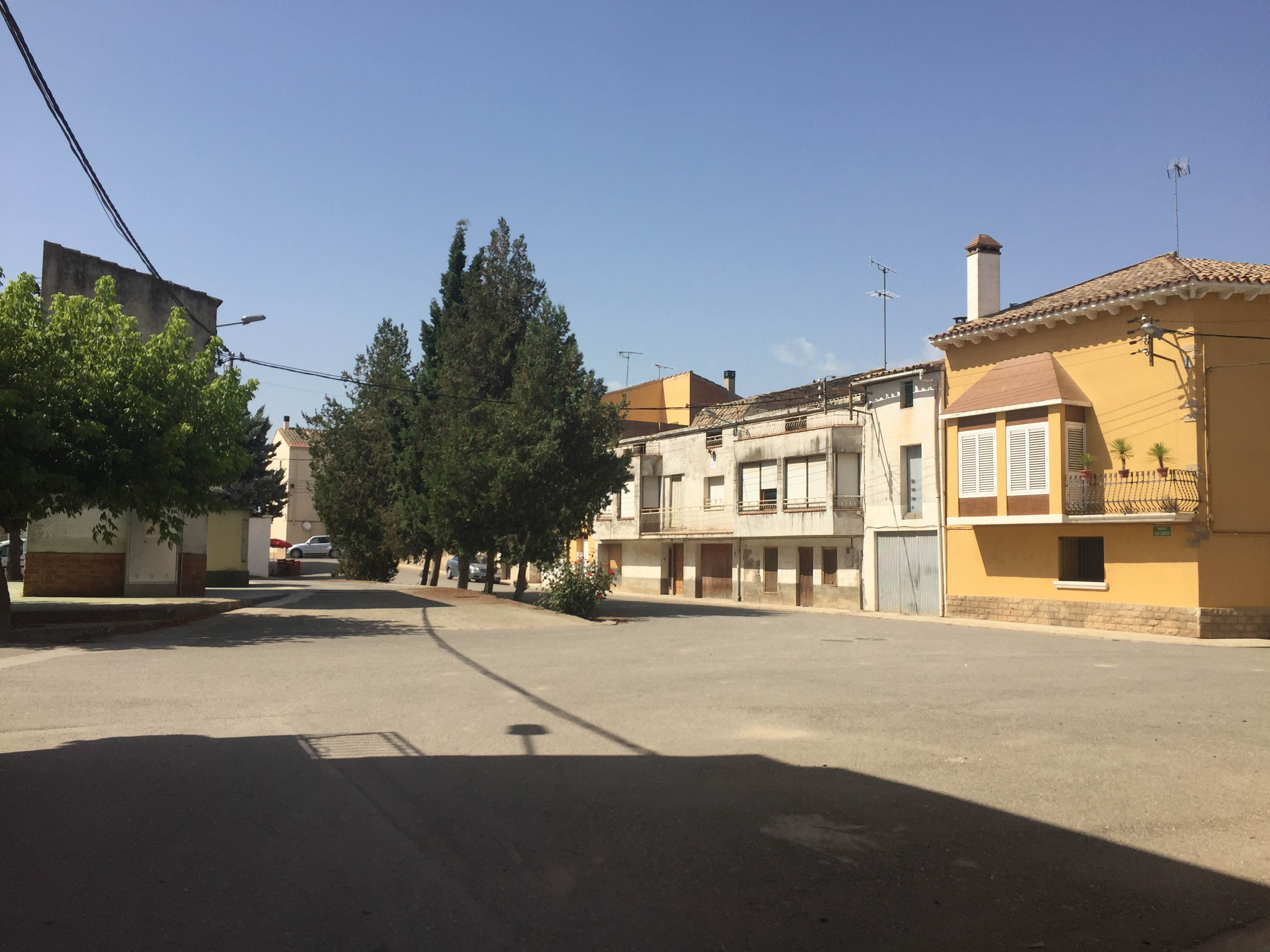
El Tarròs

El Tarròs (Spanish: Tarrós) is a small village in Tornabous municipality, in the province of Lleida, in Catalonia, Spain. In 2008 it had 100 inhabitants.

It's known for being the native village of the former President of Catalonia Lluís Companys. The village has an interpretive centre dedicated to Companys.
