= Martí Barrera =

Spanish politician (1889–1972)

Martí Barrera i Maresma (29 May 1889 in La Bisbal del Ampurdán – 26 April 1972 in Barcelona) was a Spanish politician, member of the Republican Left of Catalonia. He had also been an active member of the Confederación Nacional del Trabajo (CNT), director of the newspaper Solidaridad Obrera and minister of Labor in the Generalitat de Catalunya.

He participated in the anarcho-syndicalist movement in the beginning of 20th century, through the CNT. At the time, he was also director of the newspaper Solidaridad Obrera. In 1920 he was arrested and imprisoned in Mahón, in the Balearic islands, along with Lluís Companys, Salvador Seguí and about thirty other people, for their trade union activities. He stayed in prison until April 1922.

His political positions were mostly in line to those of Salvador Seguí, defending the need of trade unionism and political action. These views, along with the assassination of Salvador Seguí by employers' gunmen and the rise of what he considered extremist groups inside the CNT, led him to distance himself from it and from Solidaridad obrera.

During the dictatorship of Primo de Rivera, he created with others the newspaper Typografia Cosmos in which addressed issues of the left and the labor movement. Despite having distanced himself from the CNT, he often operated as link between the anarchists and the Catalan state to organize the anti-dictatorship struggle.

In 1932 he was elected deputy in the Parliament of Catalonia. He held the position of Consejero de Trabajo y Obras Públicas (Minister of Labor and Public Works) of the Generalitat de Catalunya. From his position he tried to prevent outbreaks of violence and conflicts.

In 1934 he was imprisoned as an aftermath of the Asturian miners' revolt but later, in the elections of February 1936, he was elected deputy in the Congress of Deputies and released. After the defeat of the republicans in the Spanish Civil War he was exiled with his family. In 1941, his wife and two daughters returned to Barcelona. He returned in 1950, after receiving authorization but, in 1953, he was sentenced to 12 years and one day in prison, the same as in 1943. He served his sentence under house arrest and with reductions.

He had three children: Heribert (who became president of The Parliament of Catalonia after Franco's dictatorship), Angelina and Rosa Maria. He was also a Freemason.

== See also ==
- Anarchism in Spain
