= Lluís Companys =

Spanish lawyer and politician (1882–1940)

The Right Honourable Lluís Companys
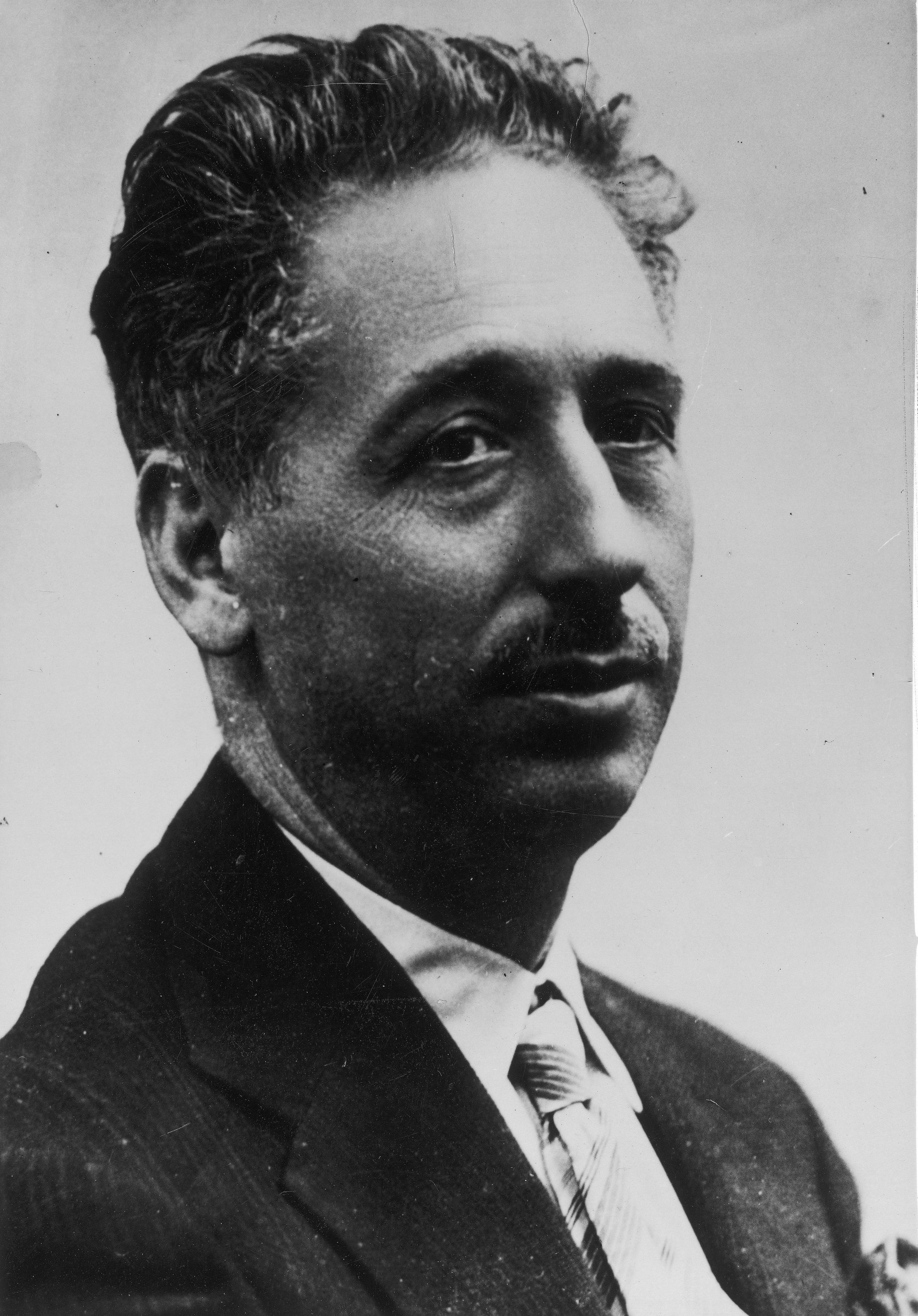

123rd President of the Government of Catalonia
- In office 25 December 1933 – 15 October 1940; Acting until 1 January 1934; In exile from 23 January 1939 to 15 October 1940
- President: Niceto Alcalá-Zamora; Manuel Azaña
- Preceded by: Francesc Macià
- Succeeded by: Josep Irla

4th Acting President of the Catalan Republic
- In office 6 October 1934 – 7 October 1934
- Preceded by: Francesc Macià (1931)
- Succeeded by: Himself as President of the Government of Catalonia

Minister of the Navy
- In office 20 June 1933 – 12 September 1933
- Prime Minister: Manuel Azaña
- Preceded by: José Giral
- Succeeded by: Vicente Iranzo Enguita

1st President of the Parliament of Catalonia
- In office 14 December 1932 – 20 June 1933
- Preceded by: Office established
- Succeeded by: Joan Casanovas i Maristany

Personal details
- Born: 21 June 1882 El Tarròs, Catalonia, Spain
- Died: 15 October 1940 (aged 58) Montjuïc, Catalonia, Spain
- Cause of death: Execution by firing squad
- Party: Catalan Republican Party; Republican Left of Catalonia
- Spouse(s): Mercè Micó (div.); Carme Ballester
- Children: Lluís (1911–1956)

Lluís Companys i Jover (Catalan pronunciation: [ʎuˈis kumˈpaɲs]; 21 June 1882 – 15 October 1940) was a Catalan politician from Spain who served as president of Catalonia from 1934 and during the Spanish Civil War.

Companys was a lawyer close to the labour movement and one of the most prominent leaders of the Republican Left of Catalonia (ERC) political party, founded in 1931. He had a key role in the events of the proclamation and first steps of the Second Spanish Republic. Appointed president of the Generalitat of Catalonia in 1934 after the death of the previous president, Francesc Macià, his government tried to consolidate the recently acquired Catalan self-government and implement a progressive agenda, despite the internal difficulties. Opposed to the inclusion of the right-wing CEDA party in the coalition Spanish government during the strikes and insurgency in October 1934, on 6 October he proclaimed a new Catalan State. He and Catalan government officials were subsequently arrested and imprisoned.

After the left-wing Popular Front won the Spanish national election in 1936, Companys was pardoned, and he returned to head the fractious Catalan government. He remained president during the Spanish Civil War, loyal to the Republican faction. A refugee in France after the Republican defeat in 1939, he was arrested in 1940 by the secret police of Nazi Germany, the Gestapo. Extradited back to Francoist Spain, he was executed on 15 October 1940.

== Early life ==
Lluís Companys i Jover was born in El Tarròs near Lleida in western Catalonia on 21 June 1882. His parents, Josep Companys and Maria Lluïsa de Jover, were peasants with aristocratic roots. The second child of ten, Companys was sent to boarding school in Barcelona at the Liceu Poliglot. He obtained his law degree from the University of Barcelona, where he met Francesc Layret, another Catalan nationalist with an interest in politics.

Companys participated in the political life of Catalonia from a young age. In 1906, the military pressured and attacked the offices of Catalan newspapers Cu-Cut! and La Veu de Catalunya, events which were followed by the passage of the repressive Ley de Jurisdicciones ("Law of Jurisdictions"), making speech against Spain and its symbols a criminal offense. In response to these events, he participated in the creation of the successful coalition Solidaritat Catalana. Later, he became affiliated with the ephemeral Republican Nationalist Federal Union (Unió Federal Nacionalista Republicana), where he was president of the youth section. He was investigated for his intense youth activities and was jailed fifteen times. After the violent confrontations in Barcelona during Tragic Week in 1909, he was classified as a "dangerous individual" in police records.

With Francesc Layret, Companys represented the left-wing labour faction of the Partit Republicà Català (Catalan Republican Party), for which he was elected local councilor of Barcelona in 1916. In November 1920, he was arrested together with Salvador Seguí (known as El Noi del Sucre), Martí Barrera and other trade unionists, and he was deported to the Castell de la Mola in Mahón, Menorca. While Layret was preparing Companys' legal defense, he was assassinated by gunmen of the Sindicatos Libres. In the 1920 Spanish legislative elections Companys took the place of Layret, who would likely have won that election, and despite having been deported, Companys was elected member of parliament for Sabadell. As a member of parliament he had legal immunity, which secured his release from prison.

In 1922 Companys was one of the founders of the peasants' trade union Unió de Rabassaires, where he worked as lawyer and director of the La Terra magazine during the years of the Primo de Rivera regime in the 1920s. Detained again, he was unable to attend the Conferència d'Esquerres (Conference of Leftists), held from 12 to 19 March 1931. The conference produced the political party Esquerra Republicana de Catalunya (ERC, Republican Left of Catalonia) by merging Estat Català (led by Francesc Macià), the Partit Republicà Català itself, and the journal L'Opinió. The latter included Joan Lluhí as prominent figure. Nevertheless, Companys was elected as an executive member of ERC, representing the Partit Republicà Català. Thanks to the bonds between the Spanish labor movement and the Spanish trade union movement, the election of Companys to this position gave the ERC great prestige in left-wing public opinion, as it would otherwise have been regarded as a party of the progressive petty bourgeoisie.

== Proclamation of Second Spanish Republic ==
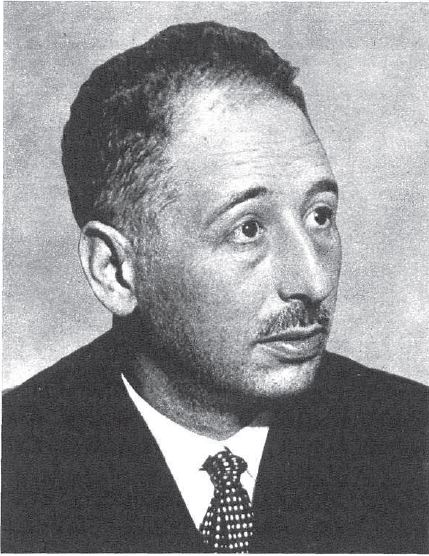
Lluís Companys as Civil Governor of Barcelona, April 1931

In the 1931 Spanish local elections, the ERC won a surprise victory in Barcelona and other municipalities of Catalonia. After he learned the results, on 14 April, Companys, who was elected a city representative, and other ERC candidates together with the Party's leader Francesc Macià, decided to take over by surprise the office of mayor and entered the City Hall. After some dispute, the transitional Mayor of Barcelona was deposed, and Companys was proclaimed new mayor. Subsequently, he hung a tricolour Spanish Republican Flag from the City Hall's balcony and proclaimed the Republic. Shortly after, Francesc Macià proclaimed the Catalan Republic within the Federation of Iberian Republics, a project that was later abandoned after gaining the promise of regional devolution and the restitution of the Catalan Generalitat (as autonomous government) from the new Republican government.

After controlling the Barcelona City Hall, Macià ordered Companys to take the office of "Gobernador Civil" (civil governor) of the Barcelona Province, which at that time held considerable powers such as policing. It had been controlled by republican radicals during the proclamation of the republic. Macià probably wanted a less public office for Companys, whom he thought of as a political rival. Companys ran as a Barcelona provincial candidate in the December 1931 Spanish legislative election. After gaining a seat, he led the ERC representation and the Catalan minority group in the new Republican Parliament. He described his political objectives in Madrid: "We, the Catalan members of the Parliament, have come here not only to defend our Statute of Autonomy [law of self-government], and the fraternal and democratic understanding of the members of Parliament; but, also to participate in matters that affect the greatness of Spain: the Constitution, the agrarian reforms and social legislation". In 1932, Companys was elected the first Speaker of the Parliament of Catalonia.

== Presidency of Catalonia and proclamation of Catalan State ==
After the death of Francesc Macià on 25 December 1933, who was presiding over the Generalitat of Catalonia, Companys was elected the successor President of the Generalitat by the Catalan Parliament. He appointed a new coalition government composed by the Republican Left of Catalonia and the other left-wing republican and catalanist parties. Under his presidency, the Parliament passed laws to improve the living conditions of the popular classes and the petite bourgeoisie. One example was the Crop Contracts Law, which protected the tenant farmers and granted them access to the land they were cultivating. The law increased tensions, however, after it was contested by the Regionalist League, and it provoked a legal dispute with the Spanish government led by Ricardo Samper. Meanwhile, the Generalitat established its own Court of Appeal (Tribunal de Cassació) and assumed executive powers in public order, according as the Statute of Autonomy stipulated.

On 6 October 1934, with the support of the Worker's Alliance and the pro-independence Escamots, Companys led a Catalan nationalist uprising. Companys proclaimed the Catalan State (Estat Català) within the "Spanish Federal Republic". The uprising was opposed by both the centrist and conservative Catalan representatives and the new centrist and right-wing republican government, led by Alejandro Lerroux. That government included ministers from the political party CEDA, which was considered by many left-wing sectors as nearly fascist. The attempt to form the Catalan state was seen as an attempt at a coup d'état, as Companys had revolted against the newly appointed center-right republican government and joined the Asturias miners' attempt at revolution. Companys asked Manuel Azaña, who happened to be in Barcelona during the events, to lead the newly proclaimed Spanish Republican government, but Azaña rejected the proposition. The proclamation was suppressed by the Spanish army, and the Catalan government members were arrested. Companys was sentenced to 30 years in prison.

For the 1936 Spanish general election on 16 February, in January 1936 various left-wing political organizations, including ERC, formed an electoral alliance called the Popular Front, led by Azaña. In Catalonia and Valencia, the coalition was known as the Front of the Lefts (Catalan: Front d'Esquerres). After the election victory of the Popular Front, Companys was pardoned by the new Spanish government, and the Catalan government was restored.

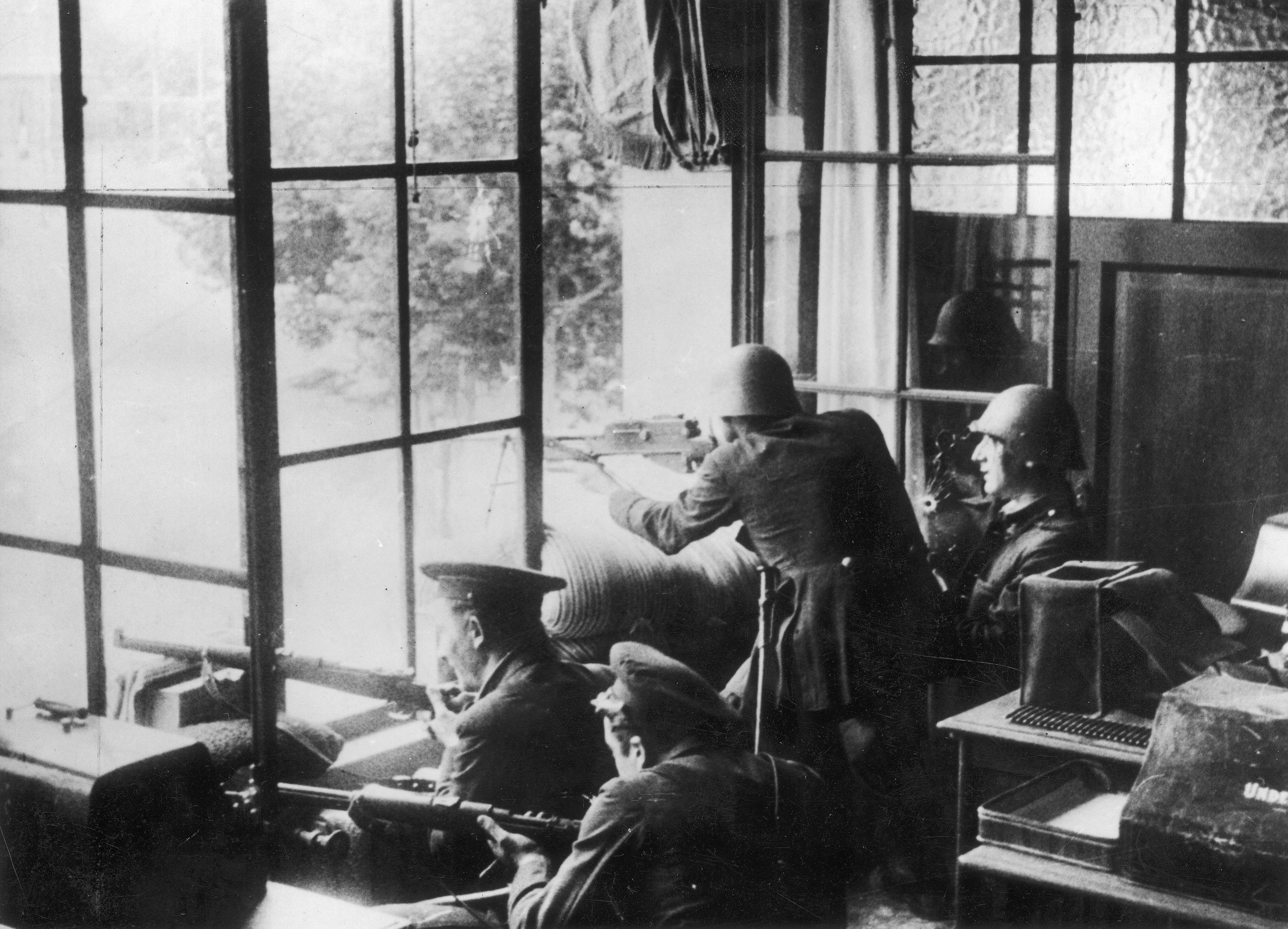
Republican soldiers and Assault Guards fighting from the Telefónica building in Barcelona during the July 1936 uprising.

The period after that election until July 1936 is considered a time of relative peace in Catalonia, in contrast with the rest of Spain. The Parliament restored their legislative activities. As a response to the 1936 Berlin Summer Olympics held in Nazi Germany, the government prepared the People's Olympiad in Barcelona, with Companys as its honorary president. The Olympiad was planned to commence on 19 July, but on that same day the Spanish Army began a national coup d'état that would fail but eventually precipitate the Spanish Civil War. On the morning of 19 July, civil conflict began between Republican and Nationalist forces in Barcelona.

== Civil War ==
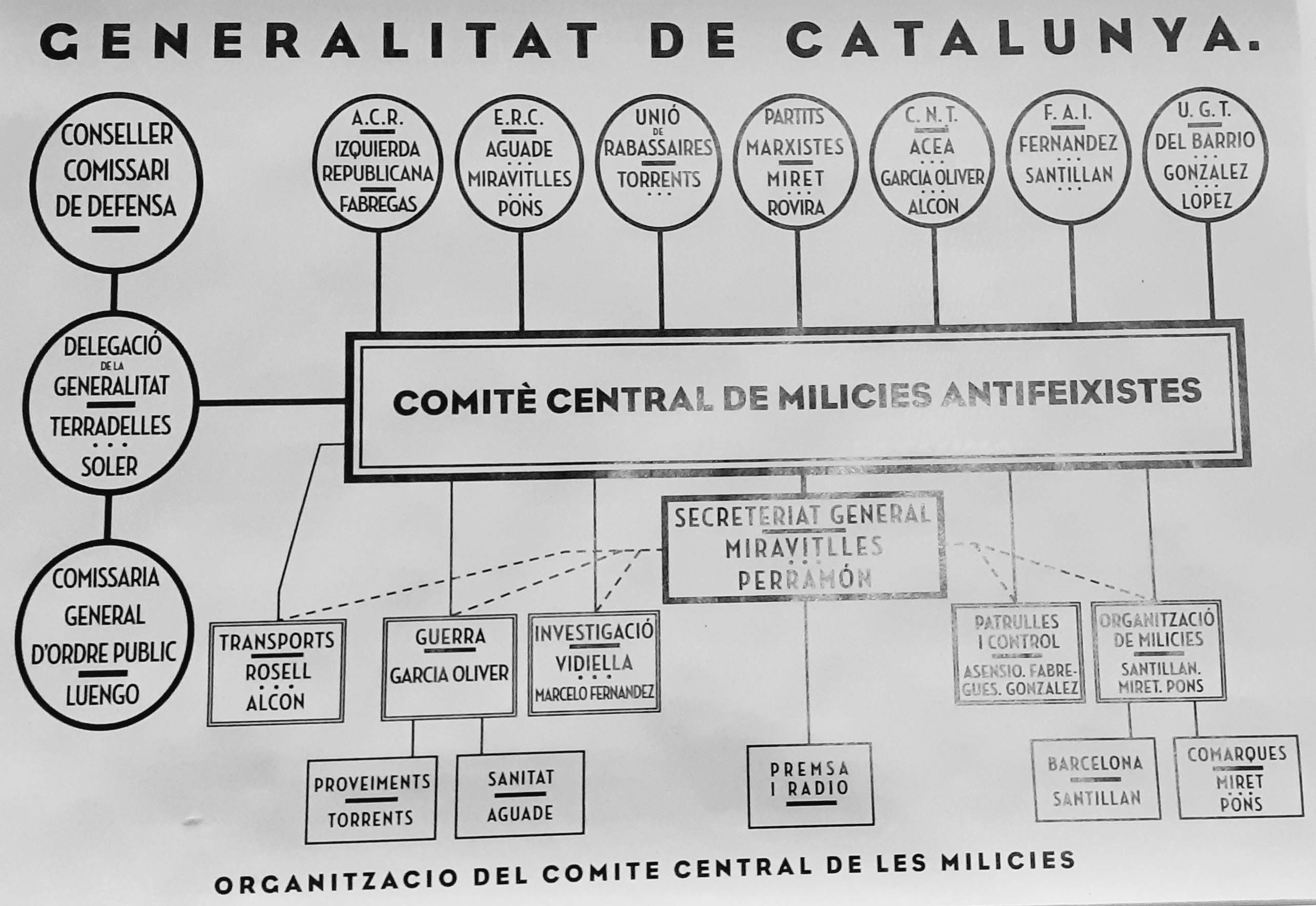
Organization chart of the Central Committee of Antifascist Militias, 1936. As president of Catalonia, Companys governed a large number of competing and fractious political groups, while nurturing Catalan autonomy.

When the Spanish Civil War began, Companys sided with the Spanish Republic against the Nationalist faction. Responding to the coup attempt in Barcelona, several working-class militias and political parties independently fought to defeat the local Nationalist forces, subsequently causing tensions in political power. By the end of the fighting on 21 July, some of the independent organizations wielded considerably more power than the government. These included the Confederación Nacional del Trabajo (CNT), an anarchist syndicalist trade union, its ally the Iberian Anarchist Federation (FAI), a Spanish anarchist organization, the Workers' Party of Marxist Unification (POUM), a revolutionary anti-Stalinist communist party, and others. Companys was instrumental in organizing an umbrella collaboration between these diverse groups called the Central Committee of Anti-Fascist Militias (CCMA). CCMA was formed on 21 July and sponsored by his Catalan government to reconcile the political tensions, recover the control of the situation, and organize the war effort.

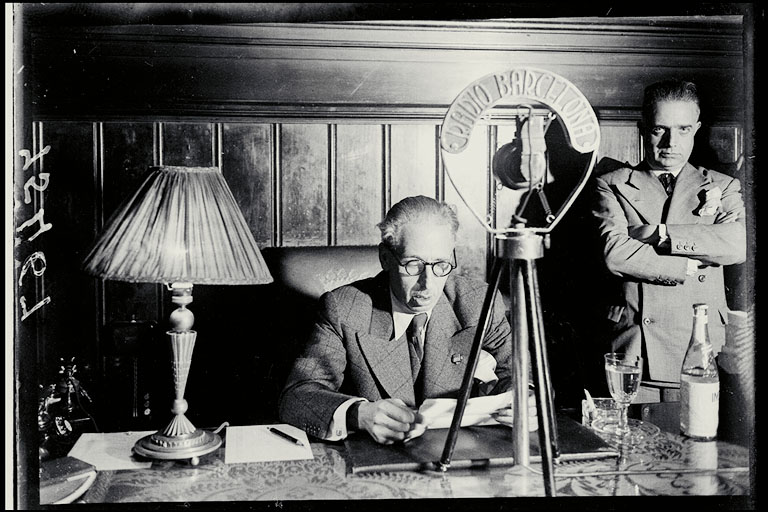
Wartime radio address of President Companys from the Palau de la Generalitat, c. December 1936

In November 1936, the Generalitat government was the target of a planned coup by members of the pro-independence party Estat Català, a break-away political party from Companys' ERC. Primarily objecting to Companys conciliation with anarchist groups, the conspirators intended to replace him with Prime Minister Joan Casanovas. The plot was exposed and some of its leaders jailed.

Companys continued to try to maintain the unity of his fragile political coalition, but after the Soviet Union's consul, Vladimir Antonov-Ovseenko, threatened to cut off Russian aid to Catalonia for his continued collaboration with the anti-Stalinist POUM, he sacked its leader Andreu Nin from his post as Minister of Justice in December 1936. As a consequence of continued Soviet/Comintern and Spanish Communist Party (PCE) pressures, POUM was declared illegal on 16 June 1937. Nin disappeared soon thereafter, widely viewed as having been assassinated by Soviet agents.

From the beginning of the war, control of public order, defense, borders and war industries had been in the hands of the Generalitat. In early May 1937, however, there were a series of violent clashes between Republican factions, an event called May Days. As a consequence, the central government role played by the anarchist CNT-FAI was removed, and control of the public security functions was assumed by the Spanish Republican government. Companys could only protest, and political tensions with the Spanish Republican forces increased.

== Exile and execution ==
With the fall of Barcelona to the Nationalists in January 1939, Companys feared for his life and left the city, departing on 24 January, 2 days prior to the Nationalist takeover. Ten days later he joined the half-million Republican soldiers and civilians in La Retirada escaping the Nationalists of Francisco Franco by crossing the Pyrenees of Catalonia to France. Companys crossed the French border at Coll de Lli, La Vajol with the Basque lehendakari (president) José Antonio Aguirre on 5 February 1939, thus beginning his exile.

A refugee in France in 1939 after the Civil War, Companys passed up various chances to leave France because his son Lluís was seriously ill in a clinic in Paris. His position became particularly perilous after Germany took France in June 1940. In collaboration with the Spanish police, the Gestapo arrested him in La Baule-les-Pins near Nantes on 13 August 1940. First detained in La Santé Prison in Paris, he was then extradited by Nazi German authorities to Spain in early September 1940. He was imprisoned at Puerta del Sol, Madrid's central square, in the basement of the headquarters of the Dirección General de Seguridad (General Directorate of State Security) at the Real Casa de Correos (Royal House of the Post Office). Held there for five weeks, he was kept in solitary confinement, interrogated, starved, tortured and brutally beaten. Senior figures of the Francoist State visited his cell, insulted him and threw coins or crusts of bread at him.

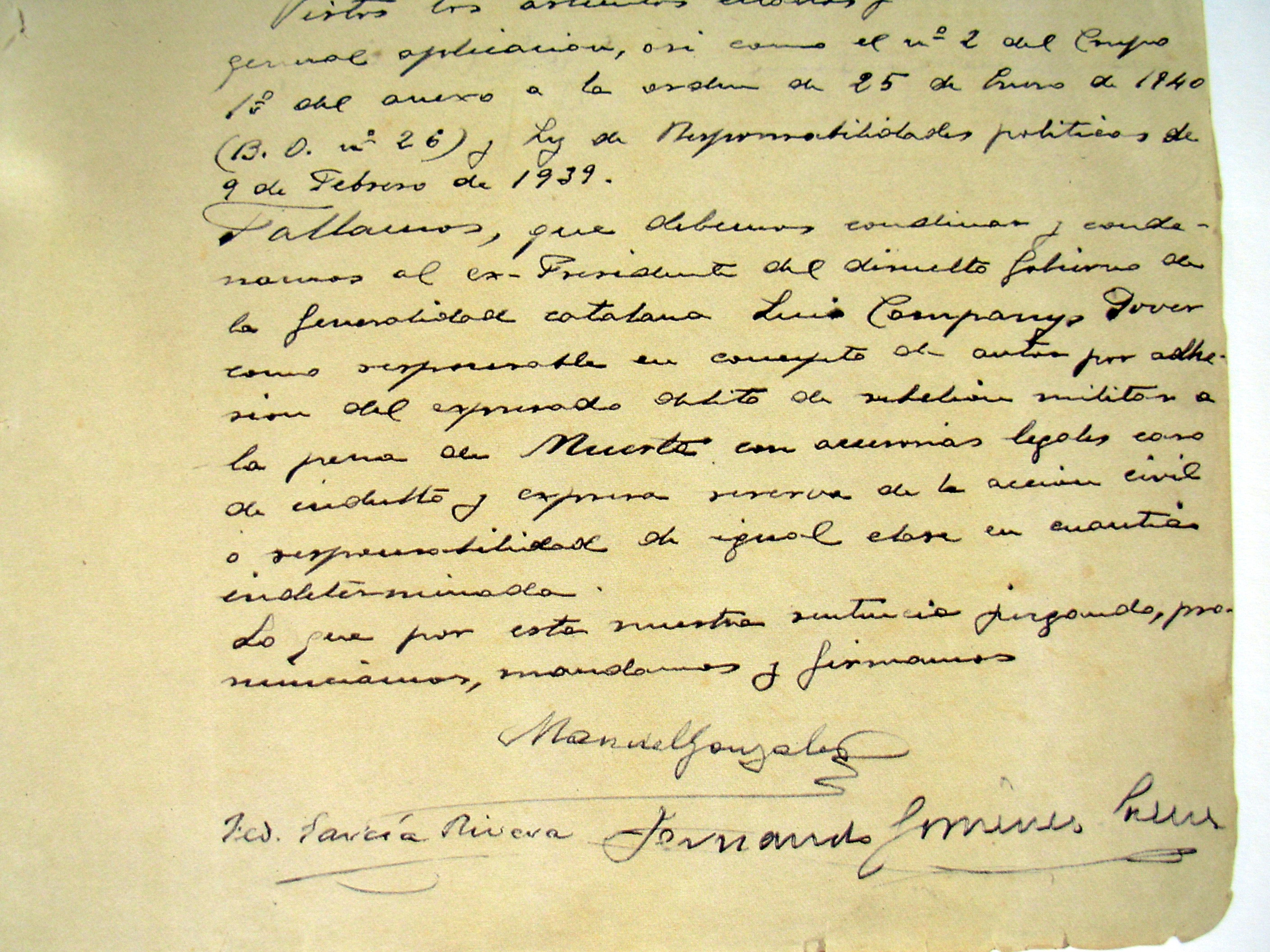
Death sentence of Lluís Companys

In a military trial held in Barcelona in mid-October 1940, Companys was accused of military rebellion and sentenced to death. The trial lasted less than one hour and lacked legal guarantees. During the trial, Companys was courageously defended by Ramón de Colubí, a young soldier who had fought in the war for the rebels. Colubí sent a telegram to Franco pleading for clemency for Companys, to no avail. In 2015 Víctor Gay Zaragoza, a Catalan writer, found that Companys and Colubí were relatives.

Efforts to save Companys were useless, and at 6:30 a.m. on 15 October 1940 he was executed at Montjuïc Castle. Refusing to wear a blindfold, he was taken barefoot before a firing squad of Civil Guards, and, as they fired, Companys shouted 'Per Catalunya!' (For Catalonia!). The cause of death was cynically listed as due to 'traumatic internal hemorrhage'. He was the only democratically elected president executed by a fascist regime in Europe during this era.

== Legacy ==
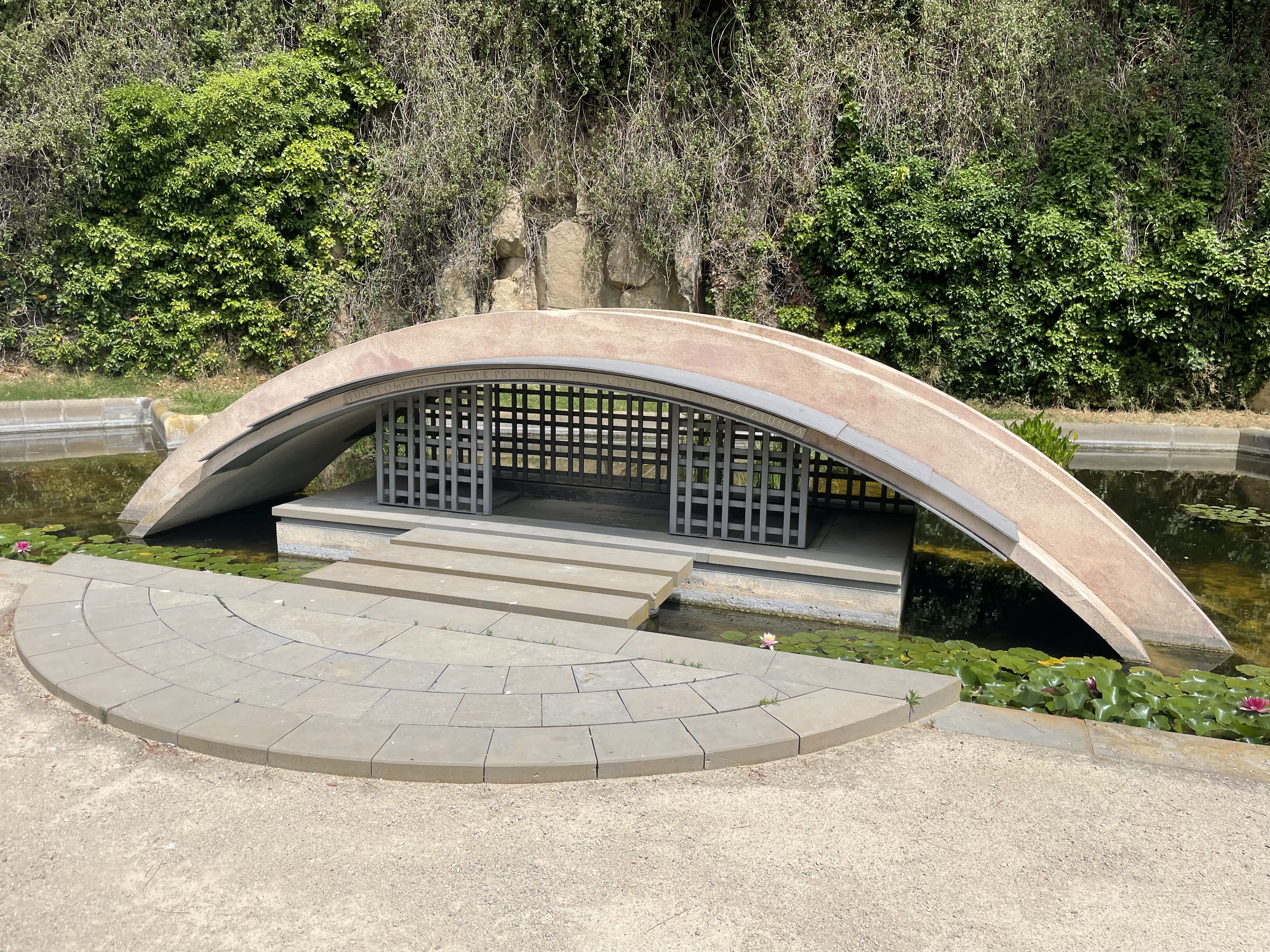
Grave of Lluís Companys at Montjuïc Cemetery

Lluís Companys is buried at the Montjuïc Cemetery within the memorial space Fossar de la Pedrera, which is dedicated to Republican victims of the Civil War. An annual memorial to Companys and the 1,700 Republicans executed for political reasons is held at his grave site on the anniversary of his execution on 15 October.

In Catalonia, Companys is viewed as a martyr to Catalan nationalism and independence. In Spain, Companys' legacy is divisive, however. While perceived favorably and with reverence by liberals, progressives and those favoring independence in Catalonia, conservative and right-wing factions in Catalonia and Spain view his memory as a threat to the unity of Spain. In recent years, multiple controversial and unsuccessful attempts have been made to rescind the guilty verdict of Companys' court martial.

In 1998 a monument to Companys was installed near Arc de Triomf, on Passeig de Lluís Companys in Barcelona. The poet Conxita Julià, who as a teenager had written to Companys while he was in prison in 1934–1936, is portrayed next to Companys' image in the monument. The main stadium used for the 1992 Summer Olympics, located on Montjuïc, was officially named in his memory in 2001. Many cities and villages of Catalonia have named streets and squares after him.

His personal archive is located in the CRAI Library of the Pavilion of the Republic at the University of Barcelona. It consists of correspondence about him, as well as discourses and declarations between 1936 and 1938.

== See also ==
- List of people executed by Francoist Spain
- Martyrs of the Spanish Civil War
- Red Terror (Spain)
- White Terror (Spain)

Political offices
Preceded by Francesc Macià	President of the Government of Catalonia; Acting until 1 January 1934 in exile from 23 January 1939 to 15 October 1940; 1933–1940	Succeeded by Josep Irla; In exile
Preceded by New title	President of the Parliament of Catalonia; 1932–1933	Succeeded by Joan Casanovas i Maristany
Preceded by Francesc Macià, in 1931	Acting President of the Catalan Republic; 1934	Succeeded by Himself, as President of the Generalitat de Catalunya
Preceded by José Giral	Minister of the Navy; 1933	Succeeded by Vicente Iranzo Enguita
Party political offices
Preceded by Francesc Macià	President of ERC; 1933–1934	Succeeded by Carles Pi i Sunyer
Preceded by Carles Pi i Sunyer	President of ERC; 1936–1940	Succeeded by Vacant, next in 1993, Heribert Barrera
