= 2019 Catalan protests =

Protests over sentencing in Spain

- Protestas por la sentencia del juicio a los líderes del proceso independentista catalán Marchas por la Libertad; Part of the Catalan independence movement and the trial of Catalonia independence leaders
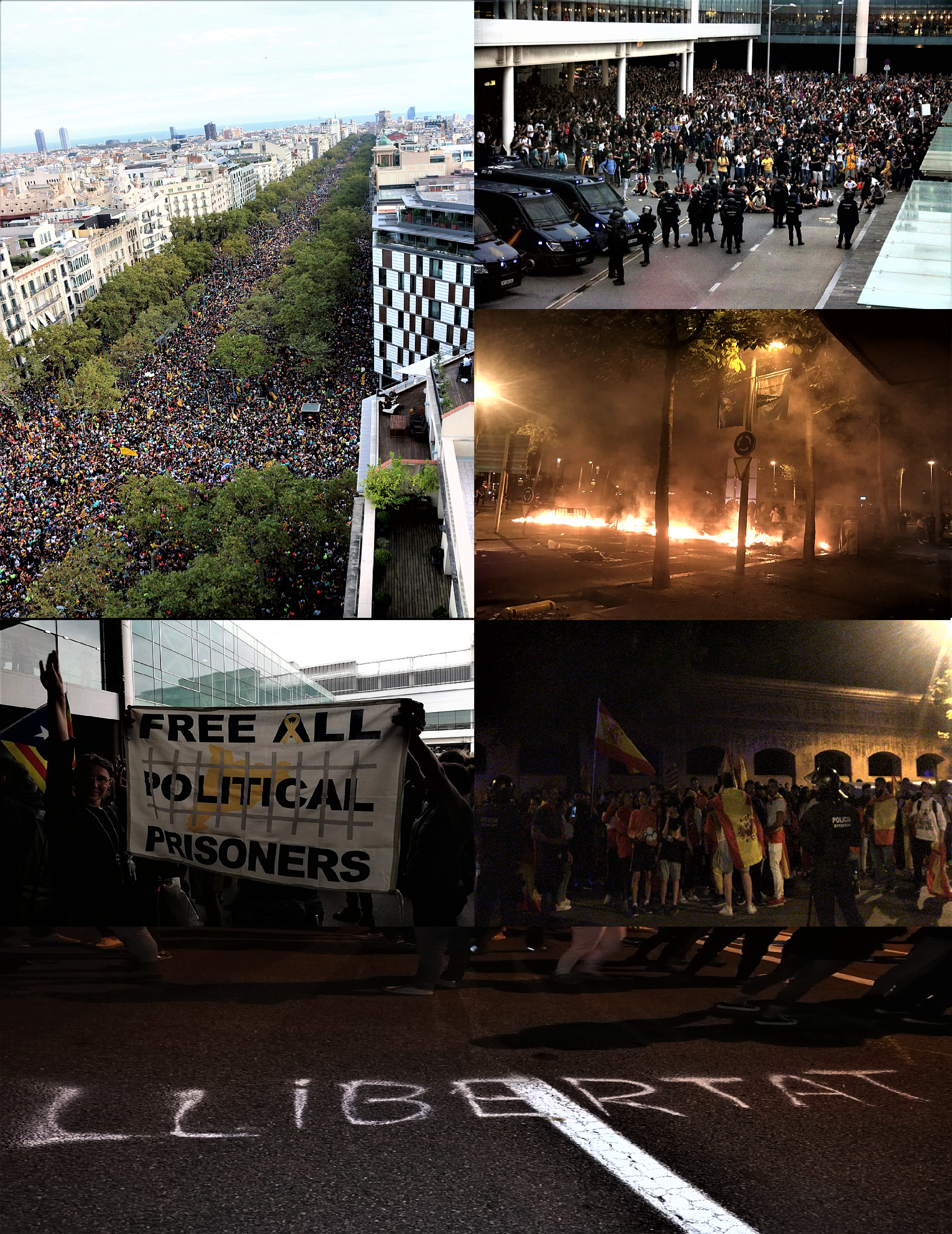
- From left to right on the hands of the clock: March for Liberty Protesters in the Passeig de Gràcia, Barcelona, on 18 October 2019 blocking the passage to the station Aeroport Station T1 of Barcelona metro; burning of streets in Girona; independentistas in the Josep Tarradellas Barcelona-El Prat airport with “Free all political prisoners” sign; Spanish unionists in a vigil in the Catalan centre and the track with the word "Llibertat" (Catalan for "Liberty")
- Date: 14 October 2019 – 20 November 2019
- Location: Catalonia
- Caused by: Sentencing of nine Catalan independence leaders by the Spanish Supreme Court; Catalan independence movement; Police Brutality
- Methods: Demonstrations, civil disobedience, civil resistance, riots, occupations, general strikes

Parties
Kingdom of Spain: Government of Spain; Supreme Court; Police forces: National Police Corps; Civil Guard	Supporters of Catalan independence or referendum: Committees for the Defense of the Republic; Assemblea Nacional Catalana; Òmnium Cultural; Democratic Tsunami	Government of Catalonia: Mossos d'Esquadra

Lead figures
Pedro Sánchez; Carmen Calvo Poyato; Carlos Lesmes; Margarita Robles; Fernando Grande-Marlaska; Francisco Pardo; María José Segarra; Dolores Delgado; Josep Borrell; Arancha González Laya		Quim Torra; Miquel Buch

Number
	>525,000 protesters	

Casualties and losses
283 police officers injured (3 serious, 1 in a critical condition)	576 protesters injured (19 serious, 1 in a critical condition); 300 protesters arrested	

The sentencing of nine Catalan independence leaders in a 2019 trial by the Supreme Court of Spain triggered protests in Catalonia. They were convicted of sedition and other crimes against the Spanish state for their role in the organization of the 2017 Catalan independence referendum.

== Background ==
The Spanish autonomous community of Catalonia has a long established independence movement, which seeks to establish Catalonia as an independent and sovereign republic, thus breaking off from the Kingdom of Spain. A non-binding 2014 Catalan self-determination referendum resulted in a victory for proponents of Catalan independence (although with a turnout of 37%), which emboldened Catalan authorities to conduct the 2017 Catalan independence referendum, which they deemed would be binding and result in the independence of Catalonia.

The Spanish Government, then led by Mariano Rajoy, however, considered this an act of illegal separatism and appealed to the Spanish Supreme Court to block the referendum. The Supreme Court concurred and ordered Catalonia to cancel the referendum.

The Catalan Government, however, refused and held the referendum despite the Supreme Court's binding order. The Spanish Government launched Operation Anubis, in which it attempted to forcefully stop the referendum from taking place by raiding polling stations, preventing the printing and publication of electoral materials, taking down websites advocating or providing information for the referendum and prosecuting its organizers. The Catalan government resisted the police operation and carried through with the referendum.

By the end of the polling day, the Catalan government had declared that the referendum had been successfully held and announced that over 90% of voters had voted for independence with a 43% voter turnout. Nine days later, citing the result of the referendum, the Parliament of Catalonia voted for and issued the Catalan declaration of independence, which declared an independent Republic of Catalonia.

The declaration, however, was in direct contradiction to Article 115 Spanish Constitution, as well as the orders of the Spanish Supreme court and Spanish Government. For this reason, the Spanish government ended the region's autonomy and imposed direct rule over Catalonia, seizing control of the entirety of the Catalan government's institutions and infrastructure. The Spanish Government, along with the far-right Vox Party, then began to prosecute a case against several of the ministers and members of the Catalan government, as well as the organizers of the referendum. They were brought before the Spanish Supreme Court in the trial of Catalonia independence leaders.

On 14 October 2019, nine of the Catalan independence leaders were sentenced to between nine and 13 years in prison, with another three being fined. The demonstrations erupted to protest the Supreme Court's ruling shortly thereafter.

The Blue Estelada, a common symbol of the Catalan independence movement used during the protests

The Red Estelada, a common symbol of the Catalan independence movement used during the protests

== Protests begin ==
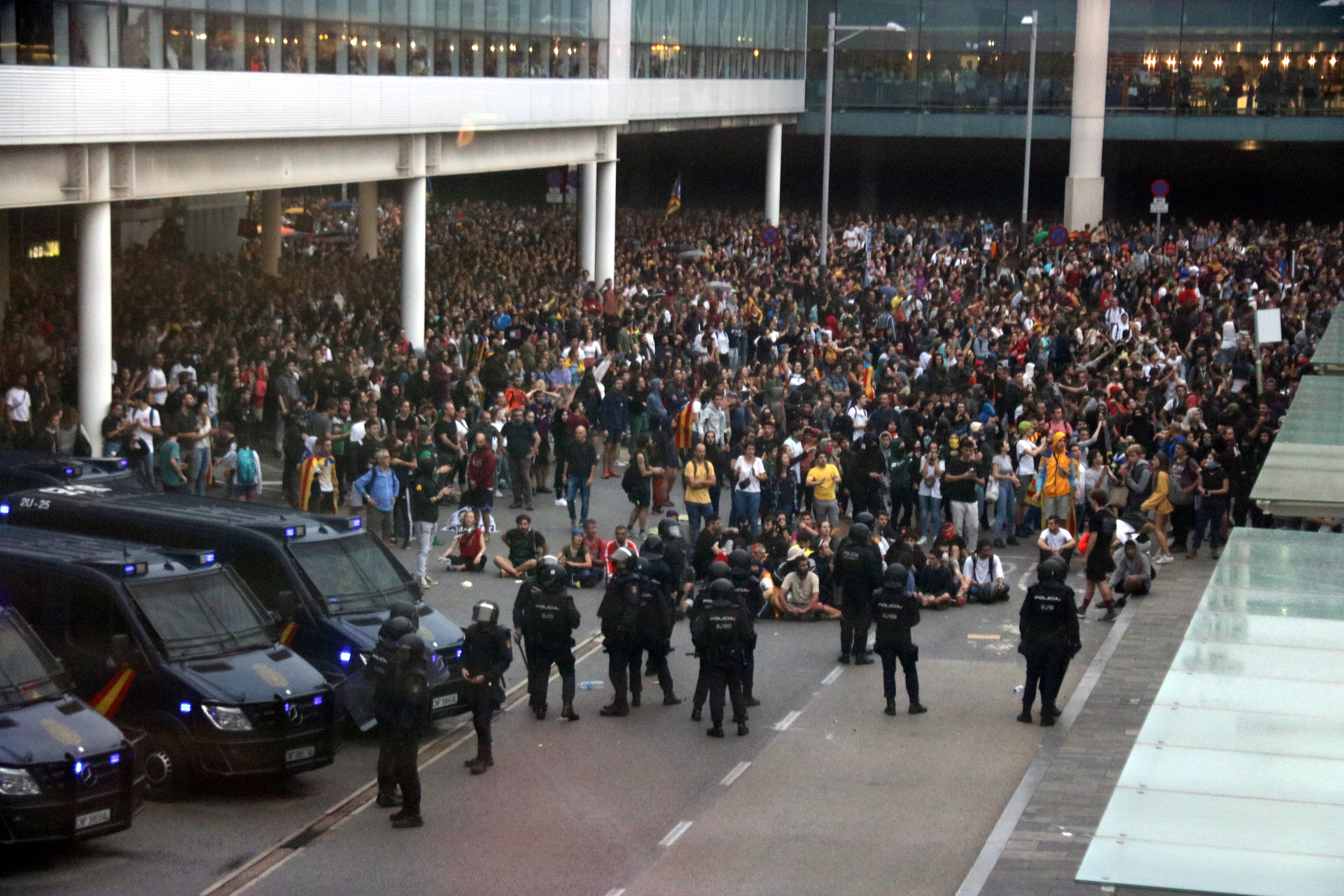
Protests at Barcelona–El Prat Josep Tarradellas Airport

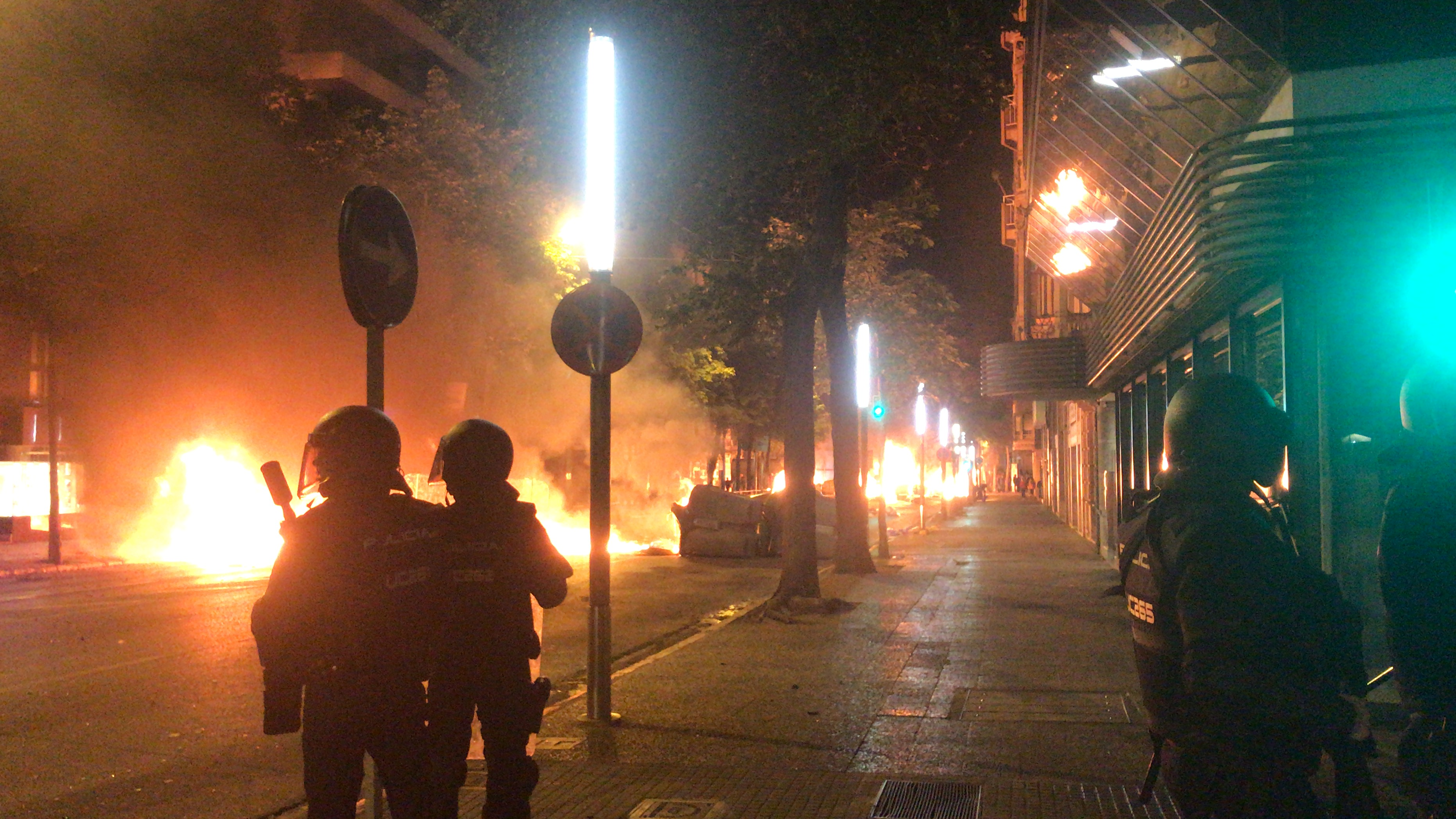
A barricade on fire. Starting 14 October 2019, there were major protests and violent riots in the Catalan municipalities with more population, with the most important ones occurring in the capital, Barcelona.

Protests against the sentencing of the Catalan independence leaders began on 14 October at Barcelona-El Prat Airport just hours after the Spanish Supreme Court announced its verdict. By the afternoon, thousands of protesters had already gathered at the airport, effectively forcing the airport to close. Clashes erupted between protesters and police forces after the latter charged at and attempted to disperse the former with police batons. The Catalan Government, led by the pro-independence Quim Torra called for both the amnesty of the convicted leaders and a renewed attempt to realize Catalan independence.

Clashes erupted into open violence, as protesters reacted violently at police efforts to end the demonstration, with some demonstrators reportedly throwing rocks and using fire extinguishers against police officers. The Catalan Law Enforcement agency Mossos d'Esquadra, which had previously been accused of aiding the independence movement, replied by firing tear gas at the demonstrators. The pro-independence speaker of the Catalan Parliament condemned the violent incidents and called for peaceful protests against the ruling. The protests grew larger, as more and more Catalans took to the streets. Some demonstrators attempted to storm buildings belonging to the Spanish Government and clashed with police forces. The Spanish Police announced that 51 protesters had been arrested.

== Quim Torra addresses the protest ==
On 17 October, the President of the Government of Catalonia, Quim Torra, called for an immediate halt to violence and disassociated himself from violent protesters, while at the same time calling for more peaceful protests. Nevertheless, the situation in Barcelona had evolved into open street battles between protesters and police, as both violent demonstrators attacked and provoked police forces, and police officers charged peaceful protesters for their proximity to violent ones.

Shortly thereafter, the Catalan President attempted to rally the crowd by stating that he would push for a new independence referendum as large scale protests continued for the fourth day. On 18 October, Barcelona became paralyzed, as tens of thousands of peaceful protesters answered the Catalan President's call and rallied in support of the jailed independence leaders. The demonstration grew quickly, with the Barcelona police counting at least 525,000 protesters in the city.

== General strike ==
By late 18 October, minor trade unions (Intersindical-CSC and Intersindical Alternativa de Catalunya) linked to pro-independence movement called for a general strike. However, major trade unions (UGT and CCOO) did not endorse the event as well as representatives of the latter contested its very nature as "strike". Five peaceful marches converged on Barcelona's city center, essentially bringing the city to a halt. Protesters further blocked the road on the French-Spanish border. At least 20 other major roads were also blocked. Clashes nevertheless took place, with masked protesters confronting riot police by throwing stones and setting rubbish bins alight. 25,000 university students joined in the protest movement by declaring a peaceful student strike.

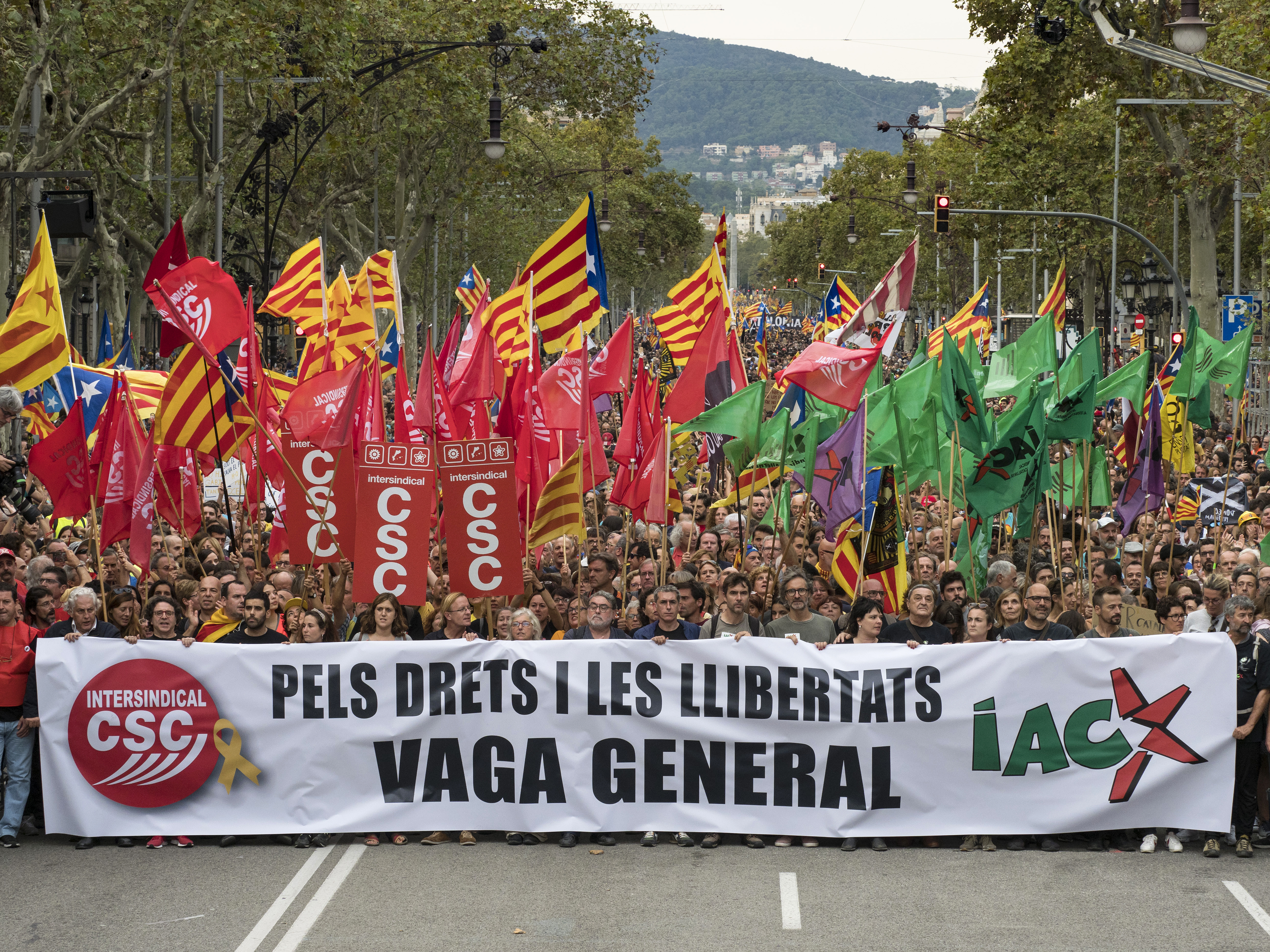
General Strike in Barcelona

As a result of the strike, trains and metro lines saw a reduction to 33% of their usual capacity, while buses saw a reduction to 25-50% of their usual capacity. The roads to the French border remained blocked and all roads leading into Barcelona were also cut. 190 flights in and out of the city were cancelled as a result of the strike. Spanish car manufacturer SEAT further announced a halt in the production of its Martorell plant and most of Barcelona's tourist sites had been closed and occupied by pro-independence demonstrators waving estelada independence flags and posters with pro-independence slogans. The El Clásico football match between FC Barcelona and Real Madrid CF was postponed due to the strike.

By the end of the day, just like the previous days, riots developed in the centre of Barcelona. Masked individuals blocked the boulevard close to the city's police headquarters. Withdrawn to the vicinity of the Plaça Urquinaona, protesters erected barricades setting trash bins in fire and hurled rubble (shattered from the pavement) and other solid objects at riot policemen. The riot units responded with non-lethal foam, rubber bullets, tear gas, and smoke grenades. For the first time, the Mossos used water cannon trucks acquired in 1994 from Israel in order to clear the barricades. The clashes spread to cities outside Barcelona, with Spain's acting interior minister stating that 207 policemen had been injured since the start of the protests, while also noting that 128 people had been arrested by the nation's police forces. Miquel Buch, the Catalan Interior Minister, responsible for public order, and a pro-independence politician, called the violence "unprecedented" and distanced himself from the violent events, instead calling for peaceful protests to continue.

A Spanish judge ordered the closure of an influential, but secretive Catalan protest group dubbed Democratic Tsunami. It had drawn thousands of followers and had directed its members to protest sites. Democratic Tsunami reacted to its ban by accusing the Spanish Authorities of censorship, stating that it had always been non-violent.

On 19 October, following a fifth consecutive night of violence, Catalan President Quim Torra called for talks between the Catalan independence movement and the Spanish government, adding that violence had never been the "flag" of the independence movement. The head of the Spanish Government, Prime Minister Pedro Sánchez, refused to hold talks with the Catalan government, as it deemed the former had not condemned the violence strongly enough. He further categorically rejected the idea of discussing Catalan independence, stating that it was impossible under Spanish law.

Despite the pleas of the Catalan leaders for the demonstrations to remain peaceful, violence once again erupted by nightfall, leading to clashes between protesters and police forces for the sixth night in a row.

== Demonstrations continue ==
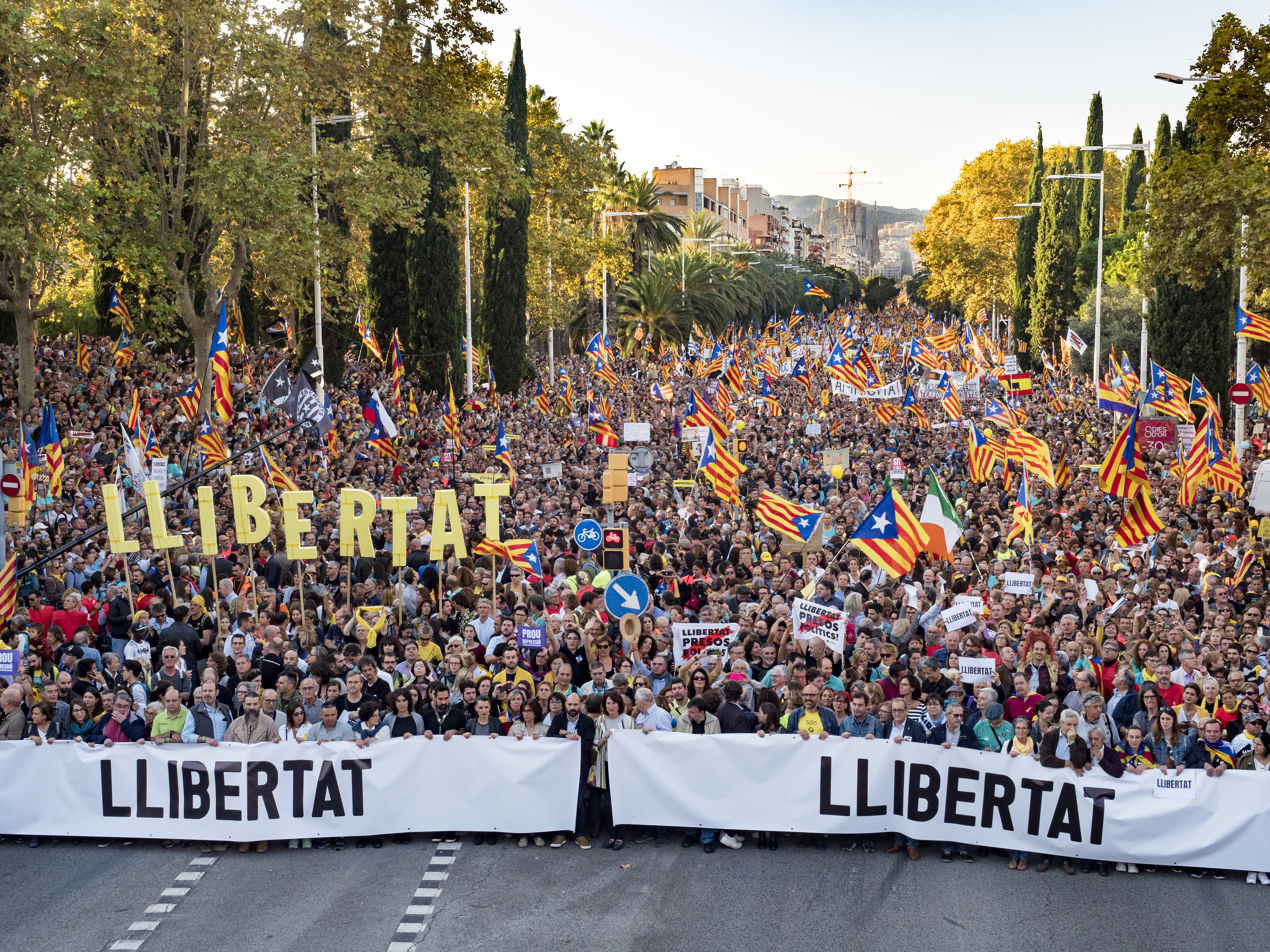
Catalan protesters in Barcelona on 26 October

Despite the fact that demonstrations had been taking place on a daily basis, the protests were reinvigorated again on 26 October, after Assemblea Nacional Catalana and Òmnium Cultural, two organizations whose former leaders had been jailed for sedition following the trial, called for a march at 5pm local time. 350,000 people attended the rally in Barcelona alone. The rally remained mostly peaceful. The Catalan president thanked the demonstrators for their participation.

A separate protest called by the Committees for the Defense of the Republic began at about 7:30pm, numbering about 10,000. Despite a peaceful beginning, violent clashes took place before the local police headquarters after masked youths threw colorful plastic balls at the police officers present. The colorful balls were then replaced with stones and bottles, while police forces charged the demonstrators with batons. The protesters later formed a human chain in order to block any advances on Urquinaona square. The police charged the protesters with 20 riot vans and dispersed demonstrators through Barcelona's Gran Via avenue after splitting the protest in two. At several points the demonstrators resisted the charges by setting up barricades on the street.

== See also ==
- Self-determination
- Operación Judas (in Spanish)
