= 2019 El Clásico protest =

Protest in response to the trial of Catalonia independence leaders

- Part of the 2017 Catalan independence referendum and the trial of Catalonia independence leaders
- Date: 18 December 2019
- Location: Camp Nou, Barcelona
- Caused by: Sentencing of nine Catalan independence leaders by the Spanish Supreme Court

Casualties
- Injuries: 60 (2 in a serious condition)
- Arrested: At least 9

The anonymous Catalan protest group, Democratic Tsunami, organized a massive protest during the El Clásico match between FC Barcelona and Real Madrid outside the Camp Nou stadium. The protest was in response of the trial of Catalonia independence leaders, who faced a total of 100 years in prison for organising the 2017 Catalan independence referendum. Hundreds of demonstrators attended the march that started before the football match with the slogan "Spain, sit and talk".

== Protest ==
During the match between FC Barcelona and Real Madrid, protests threw Molotov cocktails and set barricades on fire at Travessera de les Corts avenue and Gran Vía Carles III street, at the exteriors of Camp Nou. At least 5.000 people attended the march demanding the freedom of the Catalan separatists prisoners. During the match, loud bangs could be heard and the match had to be interrupted during a few minutes because protesters inside the stadium threw hundreds of yellow globes. At least 60 people were injured, two in a serious condition and 9 people were arrested. Dozens of Catalan police officers were also injured.

== Objectives ==
The initial idea of the Democratic Tsunami protest was to "stop" El Clásico match with two banners with "Sit and talk" slogan carried by drones. The plan failed because Catalan region police, Mossos d'Esquadra, intercepted the drones before arriving at Camp Nou.
