= Josep Tarradellas Barcelona–El Prat Airport =

International airport serving Barcelona, Spain

Josep Tarradellas Barcelona–El Prat Airport Aeropuerto Josep Tarradellas Barcelona-El Prat Aeroport Josep Tarradellas Barcelona-El Prat

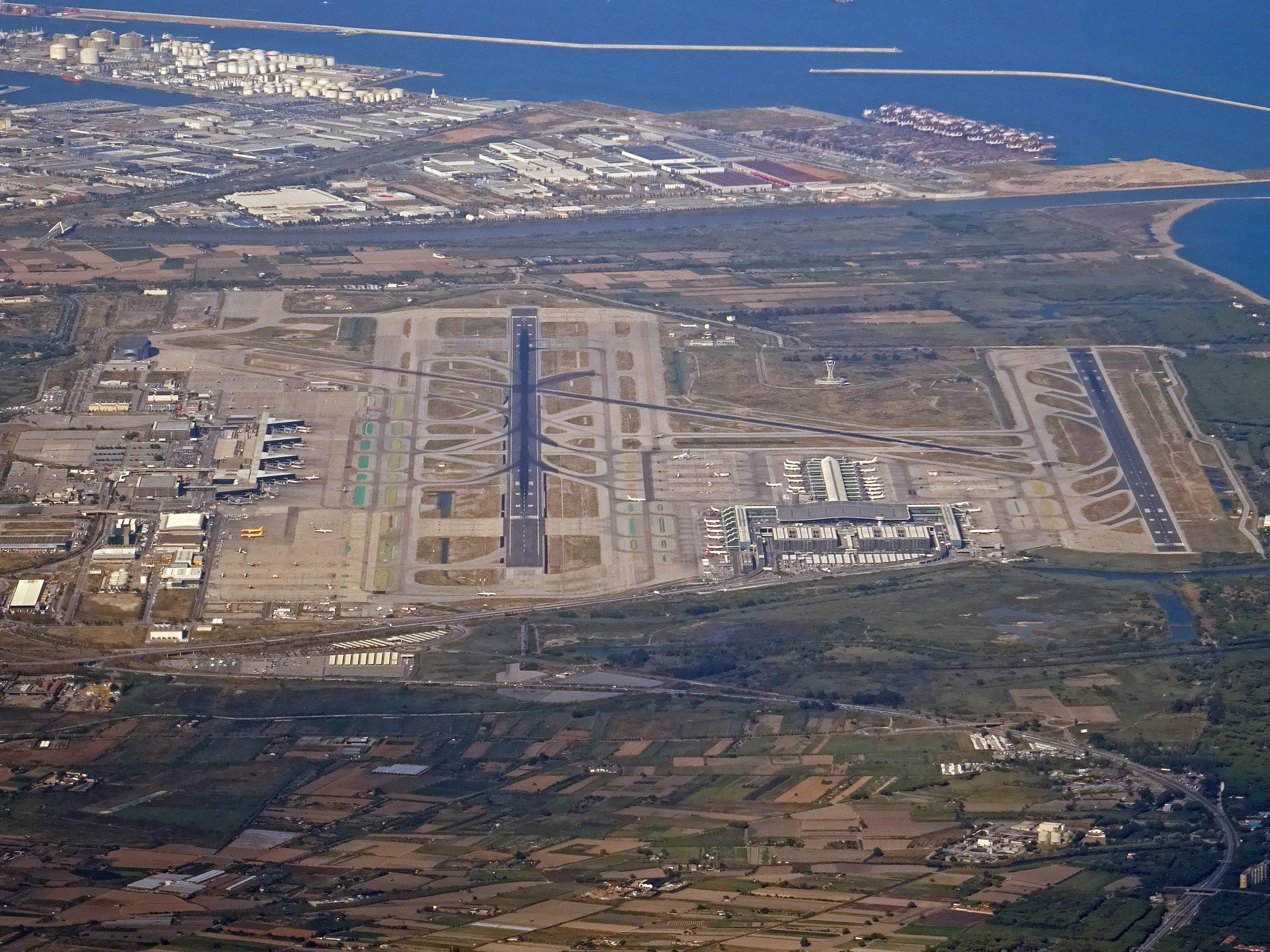
- IATA: BCN; ICAO: LEBL; WMO: 08181

Summary
- Airport type: Public
- Owner/Operator: AENA
- Serves: Barcelona metropolitan area
- Location: El Prat de Llobregat, Catalonia, Spain
- Hub for: Level; Air Nostrum; Vueling
- Operating base for: easyJet; Ryanair; Iberia
- Elevation AMSL: 4 m (13 ft)
- Coordinates: 41°17′49″N 002°04′42″E
- Website: aena.es

Maps
- Location within Spain
- Interactive map of Josep Tarradellas; Barcelona–El Prat Airport

Runways
Direction	Length		Surface
Direction	m	ft	Surface
06L/24R	3,743	12,281	Asphalt
06R/24L	2,660	8,727	Asphalt
02/20	2,528	8,293	Asphalt

Statistics (2025)
- Total passengers: 57,483,036 ▲4.4%
- Aircraft movements: 360,786 ▲3.7%
- Cargo (Metric tonnes): 200,770
- Sources: Passenger traffic, AENA, Spanish AIP, AENA

Josep Tarradellas Barcelona–El Prat Airport (IATA: BCN, ICAO: LEBL) (Catalan: Aeroport Josep Tarradellas Barcelona-El Prat, Spanish: Aeropuerto Josep Tarradellas Barcelona-El Prat), also known as Barcelona-El Prat Airport, is an international airport located 15 km (9.3 mi) southwest of the centre of Barcelona, lying in the municipalities of El Prat de Llobregat, Viladecans, and Sant Boi, in Catalonia, Spain.

It is the second-largest and second-busiest airport in Spain, the busiest international airport of Catalonia (greatly surpassing Girona, Reus and Lleida), and the seventh busiest in Europe. In 2025, Barcelona Airport handled a record 57,483,036 passengers, up 4.4% from 2024. It is a hub for Level and Vueling, and a focus city for Air Europa, Iberia, EasyJet and Ryanair.

The Barcelona–Madrid air shuttle service, known as "Pont Aeri" (in Catalan) or "Puente Aéreo" (in Spanish), literally "Air Bridge", was the world's busiest route until 2008, with the highest number of flight operations (971 per week) in 2007. The schedule has been reduced since February 2008, when a Madrid–Barcelona high-speed rail line was opened, covering the distance in 2 hours 30 minutes, and quickly became popular.

The airport was renamed by the central Government of Spain to its current name on 21 December 2018 in honour of the first Catalan president under the current Spanish Constitution, Josep Tarradellas – a move widely criticised by the Generalitat de Catalunya and separatists due to non-consultation.

== History ==
=== Foundation and early years ===
Barcelona's first airfield, located at El Remolar, began operations in 1916. However, it did not have good expansion prospects, so a new airport at El Prat opened in 1918. The first plane was a Latécoère Salmson 300 which arrived from Toulouse with final destination Casablanca. The airport was used as headquarters of the Aeroclub of Catalonia and the base for the Spanish Navy's Zeppelin fleet. Scheduled commercial service began in 1927 with an Iberia service to Madrid Cuatro Vientos Airport. This was Iberia's first route. During the time of the Second Spanish Republic El Prat was one of the bases of LAPE (Líneas Aéreas Postales Españolas).

In 1948, a runway was built (now called runway 07-25); in the same year the first overseas service was operated by Pan American World Airways to New York City, using a Lockheed Constellation. Between 1948 and 1952, a second runway was constructed (runway 16–34), perpendicular to the previous, also taxiways were constructed and a terminal to accommodate passengers. In 1963, the airport reached one million passengers a year. A new control tower was built in 1965. In 1968, a new terminal was opened, which still exists and is in use as what is now Terminal 2B.

On 3 August 1970, Pan American World Airways inaugurated regular service among Barcelona, Lisbon and New York, operated by a Boeing 747. On 4 November of the same year, Iberia began the "Air-shuttle" service between Barcelona and Madrid–Barajas. A few years later, in 1976, a terminal was built specifically for Iberia's air-shuttle service and a terminal exclusively for cargo, an annexed mail service and an aircraft ramp for air cargo. In 1977, the airport handled over 5 million passengers annually.

From the late seventies to the early nineties, the airport was stalled in traffic and investments until the 1992 Summer Olympics held in Barcelona. El Prat underwent a major development consisting of the modernization and expansion of the existing terminal, which became known as Terminal B, and the construction of two further terminals flanking that, known as Terminals A and C respectively.

=== Development since 2010 ===
The new Terminal 1 was inaugurated on 16 June 2009, covering 545,000 m^{2} (5,866,331 sq ft). 70% of today's flights operate from Terminal 1. The old Terminals A, B and C are now known as Terminals 2A, 2B and 2C.

Due to the strong drop in air traffic after 1999 and the crisis in the aviation sector in 2001 many charter operations from Girona and Reus were diverted to El Prat, which helped the airport to survive the crisis.

On 1 February 2014, Barcelona–El Prat was the first Spanish airport to receive a daily flight with the Airbus A380-800, on the Emirates route to Dubai International Airport. Emirates also offers a second daily flight, also operated by the A380-800.

International Airlines Group (IAG) announced in December 2016 flights from Barcelona to the US, Latin America and Asia for the summer of 2017. IAG, formed by British Airways, Iberia, Vueling and Aer Lingus, created Level, the second airline, after Norwegian, launching low-cost long haul flights from the Catalan city. They announced flights from June 2017 to Los Angeles, Oakland, Punta Cana and Buenos Aires.

On 14 October 2019, the airport was the first target of protesters after the sentencing of the trial of Catalonia independence leaders. In the morning, called upon by Democratic Tsunami thousands flocked all the accesses and concourses disrupting normal operations. Catalan Police ordered the closing of all transportation services (bus, Metro and Rail) to avoid further arrivals of demonstrators. The blockade of the main access road (C-32 highway) with people walking between the terminals and city center made Taxi and other services unavailable. Deployment of riot police from Civil Guard, National Police and Mossos d'Esquadra to evict protesters lead to massive confrontations leaving dozens injured. Using social media the organizers called off the action by night time but disruption continued. More than a hundred flights were cancelled during the 14th of October and twenty more were announced for the next day by the main operator, Vueling.

== Operations ==
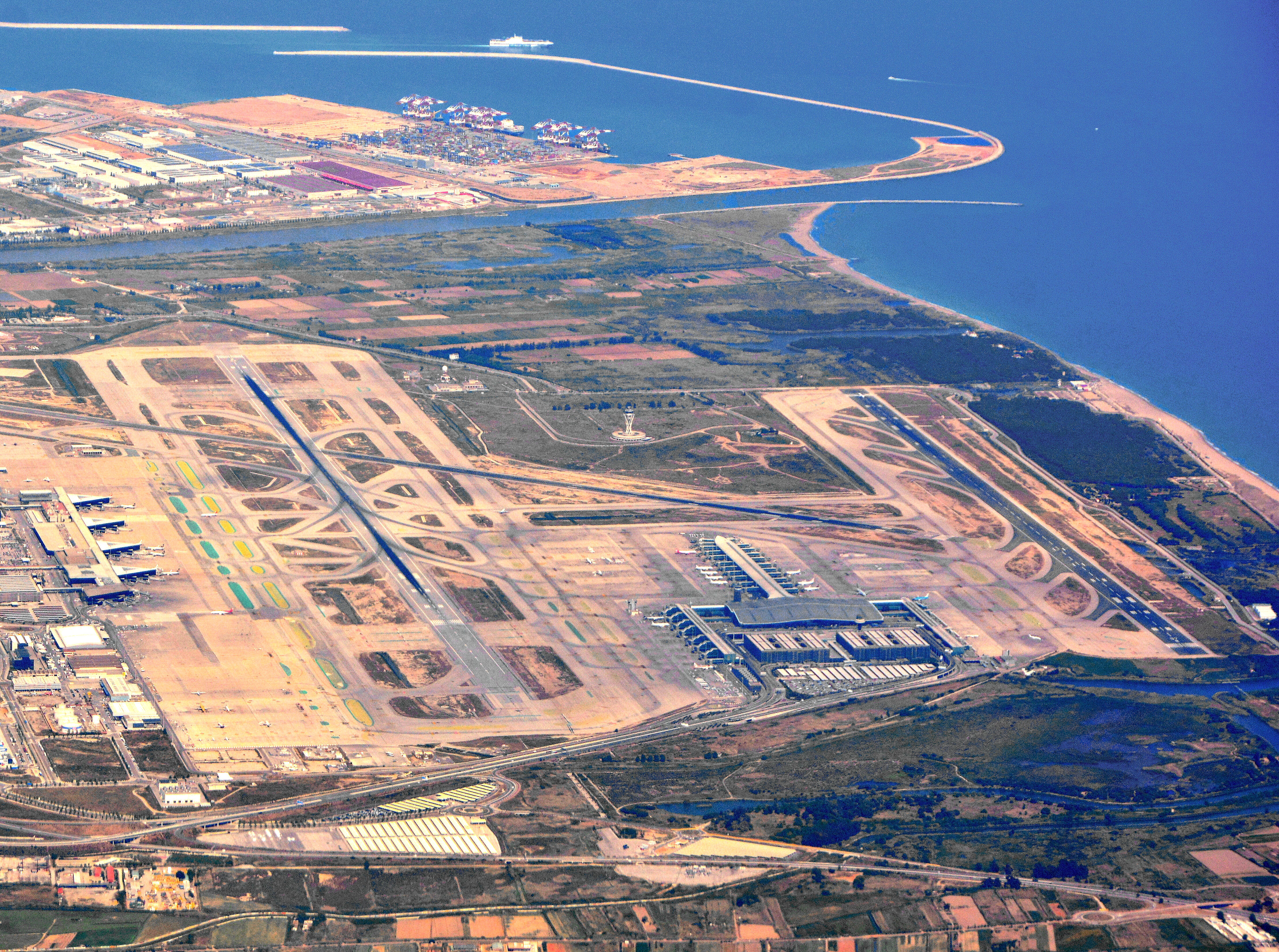
Barcelona Airport in May 2014

Airport layout

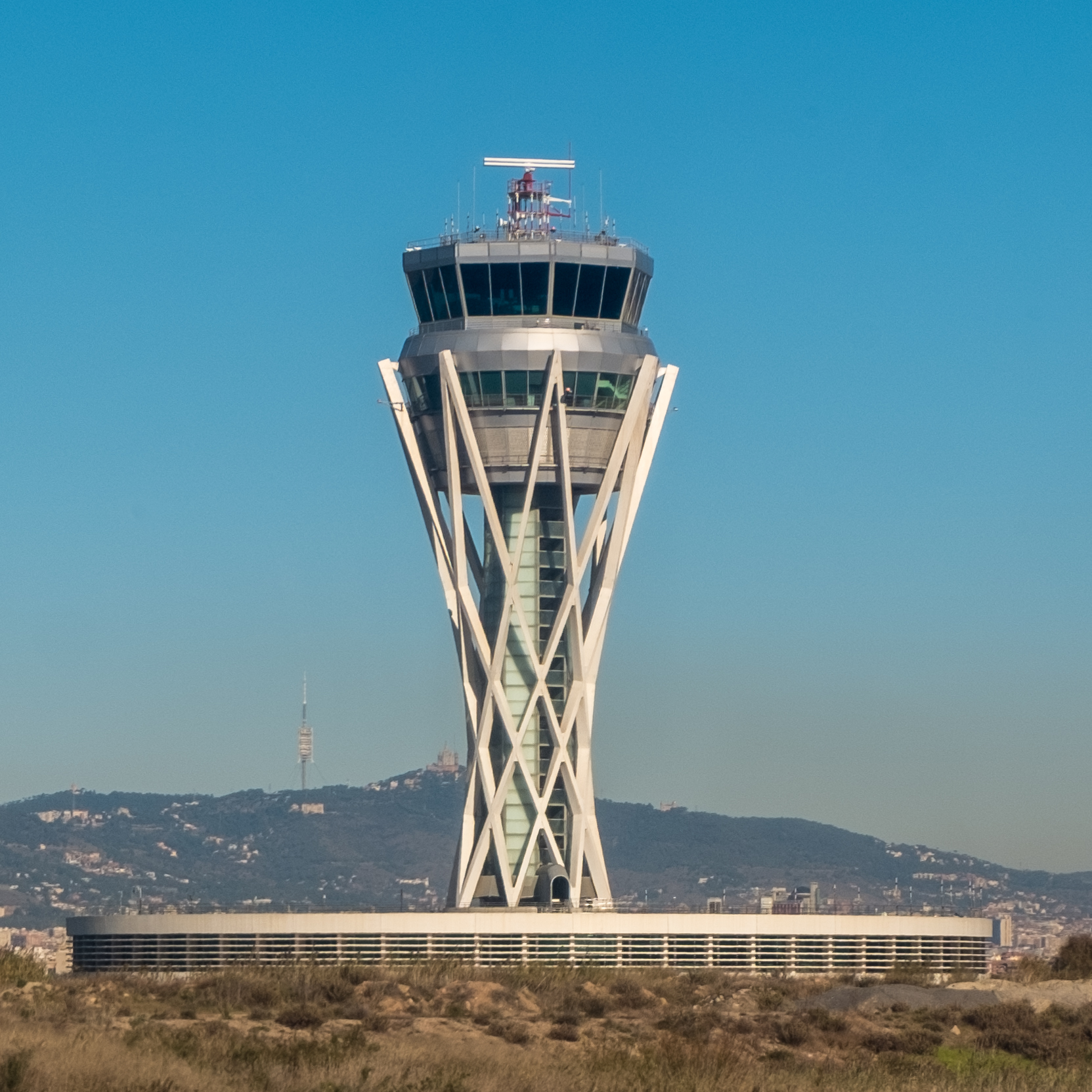
The new control tower is a hyperboloid structure.

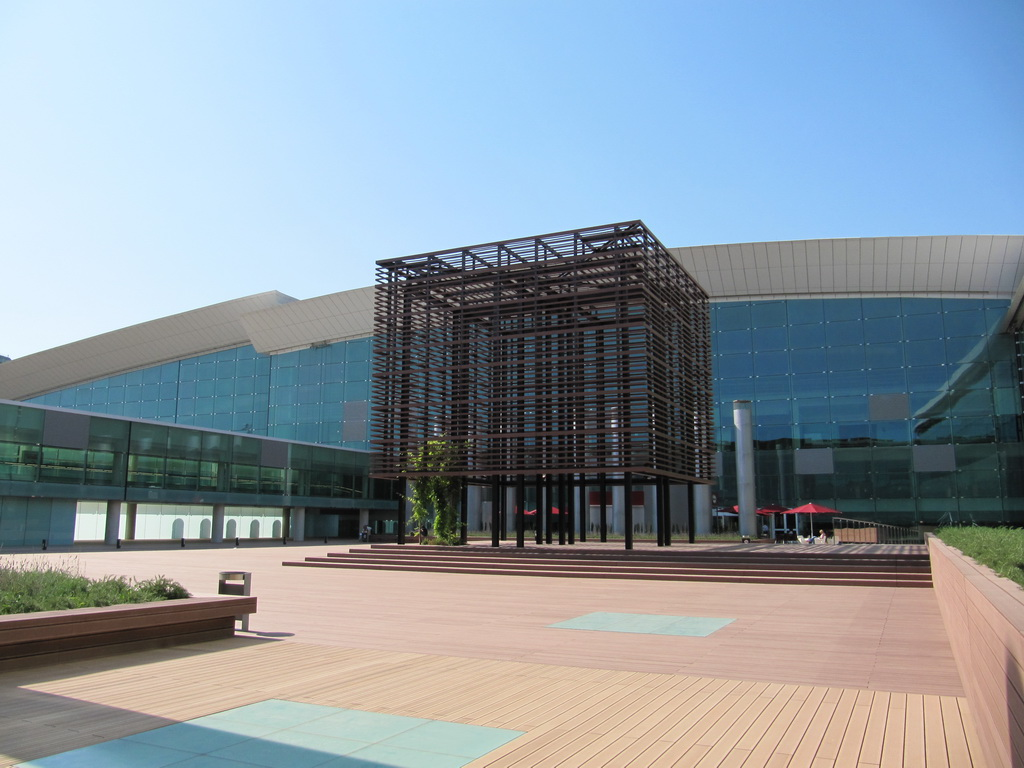
Terminal 1

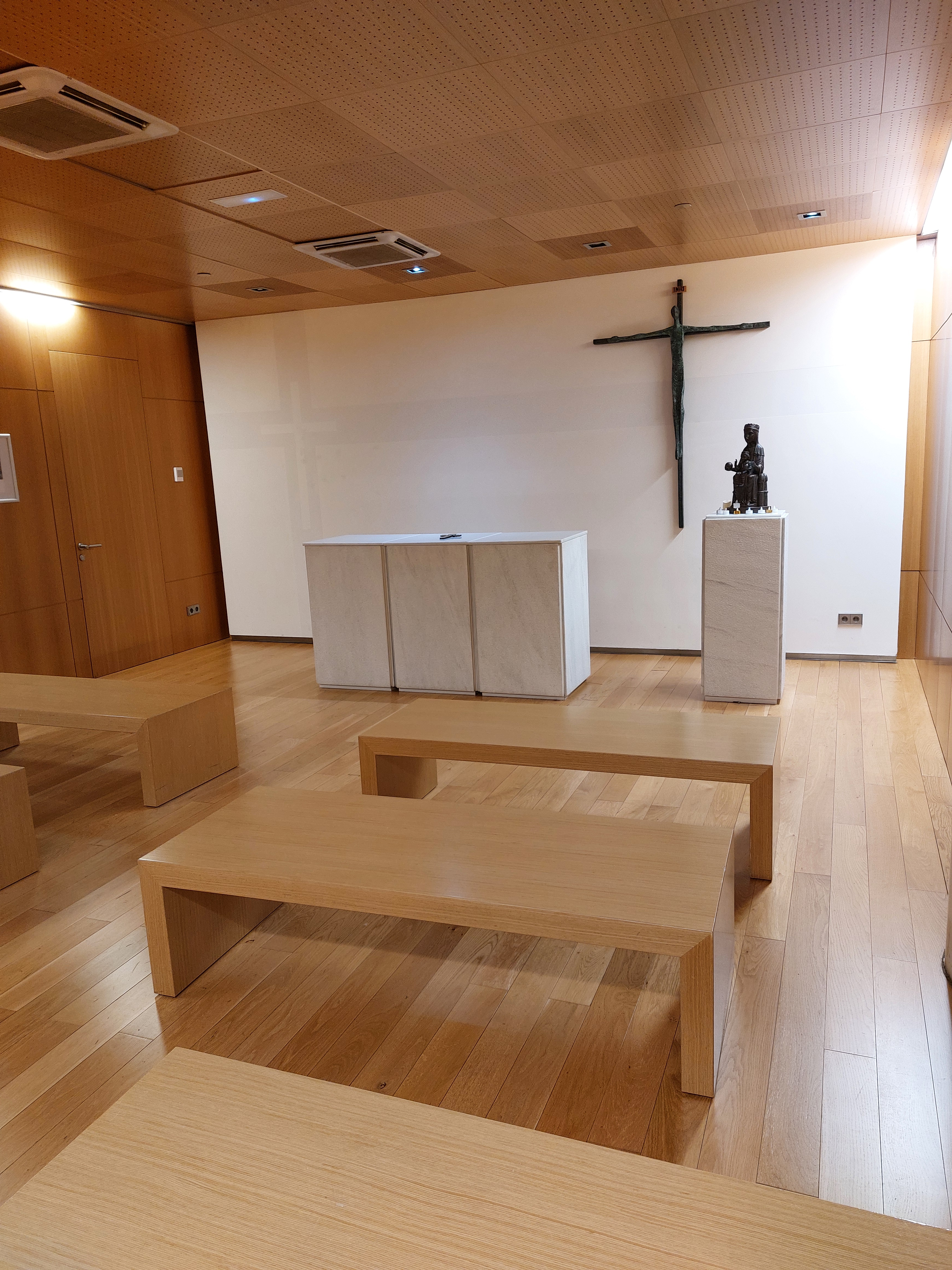
The catholic chapel at T1

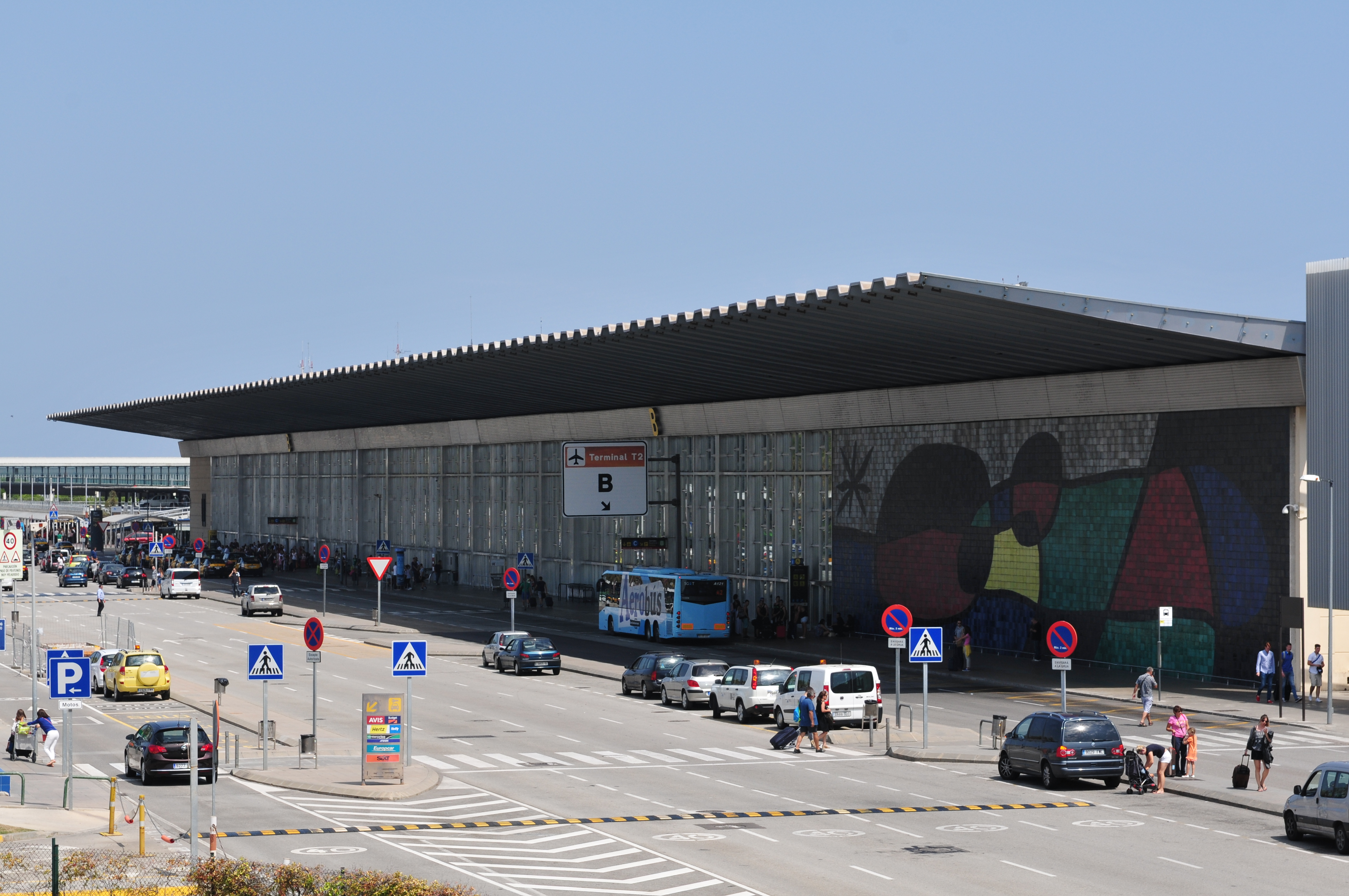
Terminal 2

=== Airlines ===
Most of the traffic at Barcelona Airport is domestic and European, in which Vueling has an operational base. Intercontinental connections have not generated a significant amount of passenger traffic during the last years. In the early twenty-first century the airport passenger carried numbers and the number of operations increased significantly.

Low-cost airline traffic grew significantly, especially after the creation of operating bases by Vueling and Clickair at the airport. Vueling and Clickair merged in July 2009, operating under the Vueling name. Other low-cost airlines operate from the airport, including Ryanair, EasyJet, Norwegian Air International, easyJet Switzerland, Wizz Air and Transavia. A new base was established at the airport in September 2010.

=== Infrastructure ===
The airport has three runways, two parallels, nominated 06L/24R and 06R/24L (the latter opened in 2004), and a cross runway 02/20. There are two terminals: T2, which is the sum of the previous Terminals A, B and C, located on the north side of the airport; and T1, on the west side, which opened on 16 June 2009. As of 2014 the two terminals had a combined total of 268 check-in counters and 64 boarding gates. Operations at the airport are restricted exclusively to Instrument flight rules (IFR) flights, except for sanitary, emergency and government VFR flights.

A plan for expansion (Plan Barcelona) was completed in 2009, adding a third terminal building (also designed by Ricardo Bofill) and control tower. An additional runway (07R/25L) was also built. The airport became capable of handling 55 million passengers annually (up from 33 million in 2007). The airport expanded in area from 8.45 to 15.33 square kilometres (3.26 to 5.92 sq mi). Further expansion was planned to be finished by 2012, with a new satellite terminal to raise capacity to 70 million passengers annually, this is better explained in Terminal T1 section.

== Terminals ==
=== Terminal 1 ===
A new Terminal 1, designed by Ricardo Bofill Taller de Arquitectura was inaugurated on 16 June 2009. The airport terminal has an area of 548,000 m^{2} (5,900,000 sq ft), an aircraft ramp of 600,000 m^{2} (6,500,000 sq ft), 13,000 new parking spaces and 45 new gates expandable to 60. This terminal is also capable of handling large aircraft like the Airbus A380-800 or Boeing 747-8I.

The terminal handles both Schengen and non-Schengen flights. It is split into 5 modules, with Module A handling flights to Madrid, Module B handling Schengen flights, Module C handling Air Nostrum flights, Module D handling non-Schengen European flights and Module E handling non-Schengen non-European flights.

Its facilities include:

- 258 check-in counters
- 60 jetways (some are prepared for the A380, with double jetways)
- 15 baggage carousels (one new carousel is equivalent to four carousels in the old terminal)
- 12,000 parking spaces, in addition to the 12,000 already in Terminal 2

The airport will be able to handle 55 million passengers annually, as opposed to the 30 million people before its construction— and will reach 90 operations an hour.

The extension of the airport with a total investment of €5.1 billion will include a new satellite terminal and refurbishment of existing terminals. The civil engineering phase of the South Terminal had a budget of €1 billion.

The construction of a satellite terminal (T1S or Terminal 1 Satèl·lit in Catalan) is planned, considering that the airport is on the verge of overcrowding because of a shortage of capacity in the existing terminals. This terminal will be 1.5 kilometres from the current T1 terminal, behind the 02-20 transversal runway. With this, the airport will be able to increase its passenger capacity to 70 million people annually.

There are two lounges located in Terminal 1.

=== Terminal 2 ===
Terminal 2 is divided into three linked sections, known as Terminal 2A, 2B and 2C. Terminal 2B is the oldest part of the complex still in use, dating back to 1968. Terminals 2A and 2C were added to expand the airport capacity before the arrival of the 1992 Summer Olympics held in the city. This expansion was also designed by Ricardo Bofill.

This terminal is mostly occupied by low-cost airlines, although there are some full-service airlines that also use this terminal.

Following the opening of Terminal 1 in 2009, Terminal 2 became almost empty until the airport authorities lowered landing fees to attract low-cost and regional carriers to fill the terminal. While this has helped, the complex is nowhere near full capacity and Terminal 2A is currently unused for departures. Terminal 2C is used only by easyJet and easyJet Switzerland flights, with flights to the UK and other non-Schengen destinations using gates M, whilst flights to destinations in the Schengen area use gates R. Terminal 2B is mostly used by Ryanair and others, like Transavia. T2A is adapted for large airplanes, such as the Boeing 777. The terminal is also split into gate areas, where flights to Schengen destinations use gates U and flights to non-Schengen destinations use gates W and Y.

== Airlines and destinations ==
The following airlines operate regular scheduled flights to and from Barcelona:

Airlines	Destinations
Aegean Airlines	Athens, Thessaloniki
Aer Lingus	Dublin
Aeroméxico	Seasonal: Mexico City–Benito Juárez
Air Algérie	Algiers, Oran
Air Arabia Maroc	Casablanca, Fès, Nador, Rabat, Tangier
Air Canada	Montréal–Trudeau; Seasonal: Toronto–Pearson
Air China	Beijing–Capital, Shanghai–Pudong
Air Europa	Madrid, Palma de Mallorca
Air France	Paris–Charles de Gaulle
Air Serbia	Belgrade
Air Transat	Montréal–Trudeau; Seasonal: Québec City (begins 15 June 2027)
airBaltic	Riga, Tallinn
AJet	Ankara
American Airlines	Miami, Philadelphia; Seasonal: Charlotte (resumes 28 May 2027), Chicago–O'Hare, Dallas/Fort Worth, New York–JFK
Arkia	Tel Aviv
Asiana Airlines	Seoul–Incheon
Atlantic Airways	Seasonal: Vágar
Austrian Airlines	Vienna
Avianca	Bogotá
Azerbaijan Airlines	Baku
Azores Airlines	Ponta Delgada
Bluebird Airways	Tel Aviv
Boliviana de Aviación	Seasonal: Santa Cruz de la Sierra–Viru Viru
British Airways	London–Heathrow; Seasonal: London–City
Brussels Airlines	Brussels
Bulgaria Air	Seasonal: Sofia
Cathay Pacific	Seasonal: Hong Kong
China Eastern Airlines	Shanghai–Pudong
Condor	Frankfurt
Croatia Airlines	Zagreb
Cyprus Airways	Seasonal: Larnaca
Dan Air	Seasonal: Bacău
Delta Air Lines	Atlanta, New York–JFK; Seasonal: Boston, Seattle/Tacoma
easyJet	Basel/Mulhouse, Berlin, Birmingham, Bristol, Edinburgh, Geneva, Glasgow, Leeds/Bradford (ends 2 January 2027), Lisbon, Liverpool, London–Gatwick, London–Luton, London–Southend, Lyon, Manchester, Milan–Linate, Milan–Malpensa, Naples, Nice, Southampton, Strasbourg; Seasonal: Aberdeen (begins 31 March 2027), Belfast–International, Rennes
Egyptair	Cairo; Seasonal: Luxor
El Al	Tel Aviv
Emirates	Dubai–International, Mexico City–Benito Juárez
Etihad Airways	Abu Dhabi
Eurowings	Cologne/Bonn, Düsseldorf, Hamburg, Prague, Salzburg, Stuttgart
Finnair	Helsinki
FlyOne	Bucharest–Otopeni; Seasonal: Chișinău, Yerevan
HiSky	Bucharest–Otopeni
Iberia	Badajoz, León, Madrid, Melilla, Pamplona, Valencia; Seasonal: Almería, Funchal, Strasbourg
Iberojet	San Salvador, Tegucigalpa/Comayagua; Seasonal: Cancún, Punta Cana
Icelandair	Reykjavík–Keflavík
ITA Airways	Rome–Fiumicino
Jet2.com	Birmingham, Leeds/Bradford, Manchester
JetBlue	Seasonal: Boston
KLM	Amsterdam
Kuwait Airways	Kuwait City
LATAM Brasil	São Paulo–Guarulhos
Level	Buenos Aires–Ezeiza, Lima, Miami, New York–JFK, Santiago de Chile
LOT Polish Airlines	Kraków, Warsaw–Chopin, Warsaw–Radom
Lufthansa	Frankfurt, Munich
Lufthansa City Airlines	Munich
Luxair	Luxembourg
Middle East Airlines	Seasonal: Beirut
Neos	Seasonal charter: Tel Aviv
Norwegian Air Shuttle	Copenhagen, Helsinki, Oslo, Stockholm–Arlanda; Seasonal: Bergen, Billund, Gothenburg, Rovaniemi, Sandefjord, Stavanger
Nouvelair	Tunis
Pegasus Airlines	Istanbul–Sabiha Gökçen, Izmir
Qatar Airways	Doha
Royal Air Maroc	Casablanca, Tétouan; Seasonal: Nador, Tangier
Royal Jordanian	Amman–Queen Alia
Ryanair	Berlin, Birmingham, Bratislava, Bristol, Brussels, Brussels-Charleroi, Budapest, Cologne/Bonn, Copenhagen, Cork, Dublin, Edinburgh, Fez, Ibiza, Kraków, Liverpool, London–Luton, London–Stansted, Luxembourg, Málaga, Malta, Manchester, Marrakesh, Menorca, Milan–Malpensa, Milan-Bergamo, Nador, Naples, Newcastle upon Tyne, Ouarzazate, Palermo, Palma de Mallorca, Paris-Beauvais, Perugia, Porto, Prague, Rabat, Reggio Calabria, Riga, Rome–Fiumicino, Seville, Stockholm–Arlanda, Sofia, Tallinn, Tangier, Turin, Venice, Vienna, Vilnius, Warsaw–Modlin; Seasonal: Alghero, East Midlands, Faro, Gdańsk, Glasgow–Prestwick, Gran Canaria, Frankfurt-Hahn, Oujda, Trieste, Zadar
Saudia	Jeddah; Seasonal: Riyadh
Scandinavian Airlines	Copenhagen, Stockholm–Arlanda; Seasonal: Oslo
Shenzhen Airlines	Shenzhen
Singapore Airlines	Milan–Malpensa (ends 25 October 2026), Singapore
Sky Express	Athens
SkyUp Airlines	Chișinău
Smartwings	Prague; Seasonal charter: Ostrava
Smartwings Hungary	Seasonal charter: Debrecen
SunExpress	Seasonal: İzmir
Swiss International Air Lines	Zürich
TAP Air Portugal	Lisbon
Transavia	Amsterdam, Eindhoven, Paris–Orly, Rotterdam/The Hague
Trinity Airways	Seoul–Incheon
Tunisair	Tunis
Turkish Airlines	Istanbul
TUS Airways	Tel Aviv
United Airlines	Newark, Washington–Dulles; Seasonal: Chicago–O'Hare, San Francisco
Volotea	Asturias, Bordeaux, Brest, Limoges, Madrid (begins 27 November 2026), Murcia, Nantes, Strasbourg, Vitoria; Seasonal: Ancona, Lille, Marseille, Olbia, Verona
Vueling	A Coruña, Algiers, Alicante, Almería, Amsterdam, Asturias, Athens, Banjul, Bari, Basel/Mulhouse, Berlin, Bilbao, Billund, Bologna, Bordeaux, Brussels, Cagliari, Cairo, Catania, Copenhagen, Córdoba Dakar–Diass, Dublin, Dubrovnik, Düsseldorf, Edinburgh, Essaouira, Florence, Fuerteventura, Geneva, Genoa, Granada, Gran Canaria, Hamburg, Hannover, Ibiza, Istanbul, Jerez de la Frontera, Lanzarote, La Palma, Logroño, Lisbon, Ljubljana, London–Gatwick, London–Heathrow, Lyon, Madrid, Málaga, Malta, Manchester, Marrakesh, Marseille, Menorca, Milan–Malpensa, Munich, Nador, Nantes, Naples, Nice, Nuremberg, Oslo, Palermo, Palma de Mallorca, Paris–Charles de Gaulle, Paris–Orly, Porto, Prague, Rome–Fiumicino, San Sebastián, Santander, Santiago de Compostela, Seville, Stockholm–Arlanda, Strasbourg, Stuttgart, Tangier, Tenerife–North, Tirana, Turin, Valencia, Valladolid, Venice, Vienna, Vigo, Zürich; Seasonal: Agadir, Birmingham, Faro, Fez, Helsinki, Mykonos, Olbia, Oran, Reykjavík–Keflavík, Rimini, Rovaniemi, Sal, Santorini, Split, Tivat, Tromsø, Tunis
WestJet	Seasonal: Calgary, Halifax
Wizz Air	Belgrade, Brașov (begins 18 December 2026), Bratislava, Bucharest–Băneasa, Bucharest–Otopeni, Budapest, Chișinău, Cluj-Napoca, Craiova, Gdańsk, Iași, Katowice, Kraków, Kutaisi, Larnaca, London–Luton, Milan–Malpensa, Naples (begins 14 December 2026), Palermo, Podgorica, Rome–Fiumicino, Skopje, Sofia, Timişoara, Tirana, Turin, Varna, Venice, Vilnius, Warsaw–Chopin, Warsaw–Modlin, Wrocław

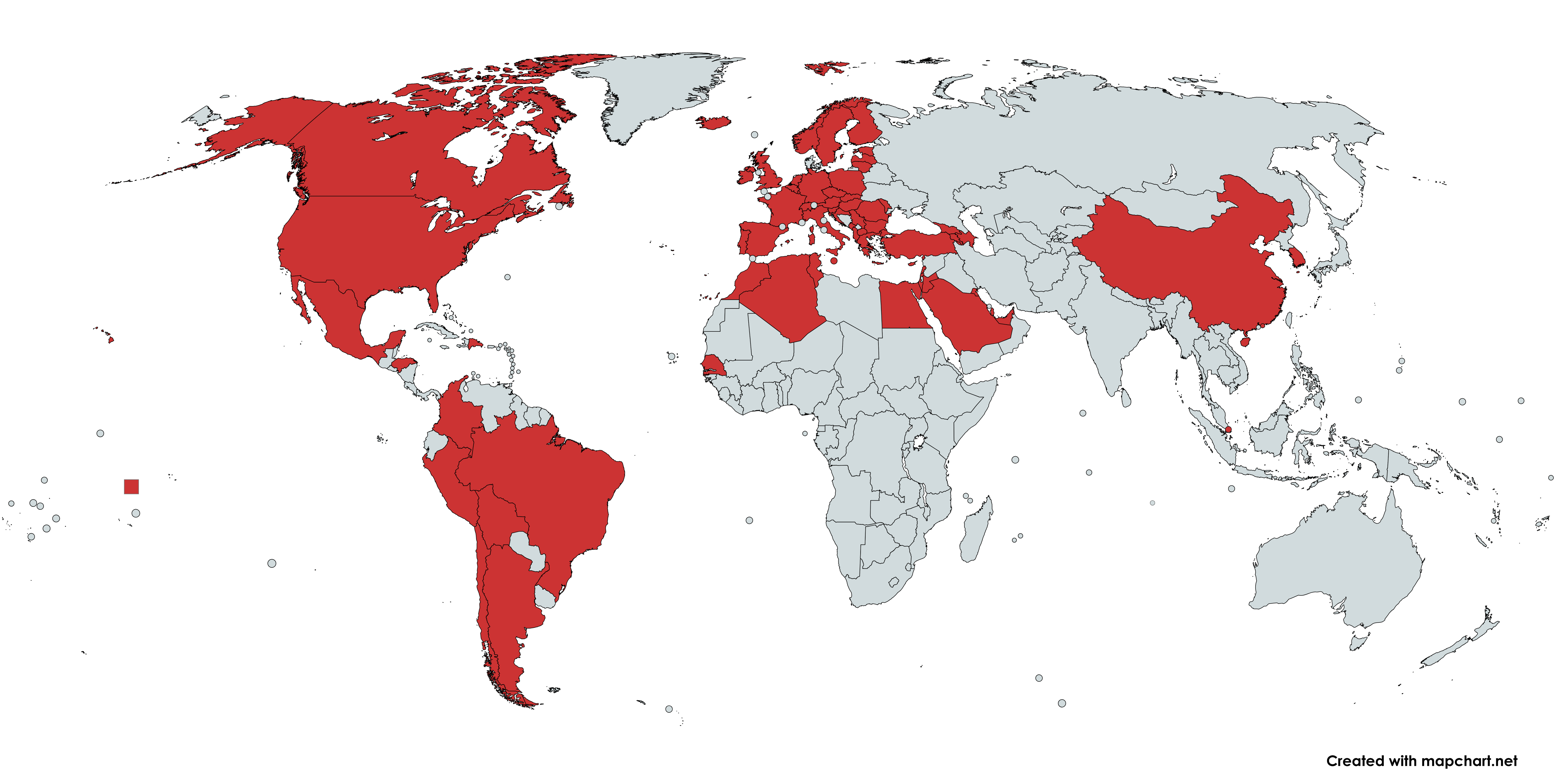
As of February 2026.

== Statistics ==
=== Annual traffic ===
Traffic by calendar year
	Passengers	Aircraft movements	Cargo (tonnes)
2000	19,809,567	255,913	88,269
2001	20,745,536	273,119	81,882
2002	21,348,211	271,023	75,905
2003	22,752,667	282,021	70,118
2004	24,558,138	291,369	84,985
2005	27,152,745	307,798	90,446
2006	30,008,152	327,636	93,404
2007	32,898,249	352,501	96,770
2008	30,208,134	321,491	104,329
2009	27,311,765	278,965	89,813
2010	29,209,595	277,832	104,279
2011	34,398,226	303,054	96,572
2012	35,144,503	290,004	96,522
2013	35,216,828	276,497	100,288
2014	37,559,044	283,850	102,692
2015	39,711,276	288,878	117,219
2016	44,154,693	307,864	132,754
2017	47,284,500	323,539	156,105
2018	50,172,457	335,651	172,939
2019	52,686,314	344,558	177,271
2020	12,739,259	122,638	114,263
2021	18,874,896	163,679	136,107
2022	41,639,622	283,394	155,600
2023	49,883,928	316,682	156,523
2024	55,034,955	347,977	181,777
2025	57,483,036	360,786	200,770
Source: Aena Statistics

=== Busiest routes ===
Busiest European routes from BCN (2025)
Rank	Destination	Passengers	Change 2024/25
1	Rome–Fiumicino	1,712,059	▲0.3%
2	Amsterdam	1,614,675	▲3.4%
3	Lisbon	1,361,653	▲4.2%
4	Milan–Malpensa	1,294,333	▲0.3%
5	Paris–Orly	1,255,064	▲11.1%
6	London–Gatwick	1,228,036	▼9.3%
7	Paris–Charles de Gaulle	1,201,406	▼7.0%
8	London–Heathrow	977,939	▼0.4%
9	Brussels	932,131	▲5.7%
10	Munich	835,280	▲1.7%
11	Frankfurt	824,471	▲1.9%
12	Vienna	763,938	▲2.5%
13	Porto	740,397	▲5.2%
14	Dublin	728,061	▲2.1%
15	Zurich	711,351	▼ -2.5%
16	Berlin	661,413	▲6.9%
17	Venice	644,399	▲19.3%
18	Istanbul	629,385	▲20.0%
19	Copenhagen	586,842	▲10.6%
20	Manchester	563,566	▲3.6%
Source: Estadísticas de tráfico aereo

Busiest intercontinental routes from BCN (2025)
Rank	Destination	Passengers	Change 2024/25
1	Doha	600,532	▲1.8%
2	Dubai-International	517,744	▲6.8%
3	New York–JFK	495,141	▲2.2%
4	Tangier	344,877	▲27.2%
5	Abu Dhabi	338,838	▲26.0%
6	Tel Aviv	313,024	▲17.5%
7	Marrakesh	266,466	▲23.6%
8	Miami	250,727	▲9.4%
9	Montréal–Trudeau	249,112	▲3.5%
10	Seoul–Incheon	232,456	▼ -1.4%
11	Istanbul-Sabiha Gökçen	230,322	▲5.2%
12	Bogotá	226,047	▲23.0%
13	Buenos Aires-Ezeiza	223,440	▲17.9%
14	Atlanta	202,830	▲6.3%
15	Casablanca	200,816	▲13.0%
16	Chicago-O'Hare	189,174	▲8.2%
17	Nador	183,439	▲33.2%
18	Newark	182,743	▲2.5%
19	Beijing-Capital	177,300	▲23.3%
20	Algiers	176,422	▲29.3%
Source: Estadísticas de tráfico aereo

Busiest domestic routes from BCN (2025)
Rank	Destination	Passengers	Change 2024/25
1	Palma de Mallorca	2,388,195	▲2.7%
2	Madrid	1,768,713	▼ -13.2%
3	Ibiza	1,296,653	▲3.0%
4	Seville	1,109,963	▼ -0.3%
5	Málaga	1,032,956	▲2.1%
6	Menorca	947,599	▲1.7%
7	Tenerife–North	702,394	▲11.6%
8	Bilbao	688,371	▼ -0.9%
9	Alicante	601,936	▲3.2%
10	Gran Canaria	571,544	▲8.8%
11	Granada	479,204	▲1.3%
12	Santiago de Compostela	457,033	▲3.4%
13	Asturias	389,189	▼ -1.3%
14	Lanzarote	282,665	▲2.8%
15	A Coruña	272,115	▲8.1%
16	Fuerteventura	201,229	▲17.7%
17	Vigo	180,078	▼ -12.1%
18	Santander	145,572	▲13.0%
19	Jerez de la Frontera	144,080	▼ -34.1%
20	San Sebastián	132,096	▼ -5.7%
Source: Estadísticas de tráfico aereo

== Ground transportation ==
=== Rail ===
==== Train ====
Terminal 2 has a Rodalies Barcelona commuter train station (on Line R2), with services every 30 minutes to Maçanet-Massanes, serving several stations in Barcelona's City Centre including Barcelona Sants and Passeig de Gràcia, providing connections with the Barcelona Metro system and national and international high-speed rail services. Rail passengers for Terminal 1 must take a connecting bus from Terminal 2B to Terminal 1.

As part of the major aforementioned airport expansion, a new shuttle train is being built to directly connect Terminal 1 to Barcelona Sants and Passeig de Gràcia, providing quicker and more frequent journeys between the airport and city centre. As of November 2023, this new line is expected to be operational sometime in 2026, six years later than originally anticipated.

==== Metro ====
Since 12 February 2016, the airport has been linked to Barcelona by Line 9 of the Barcelona Metro, with a station in each terminal, the Aeroport T1 station situated directly underneath the airport terminal T1 and the Aeroport T2 station close to the Aeroport rail station at the terminal T2. The line connects with several Barcelona Metro lines serving the city centre.

=== Road ===
The C-32B highway connects the airport to a main traffic interchange between Barcelona's Ronda de Dalt beltway and major motorways. There are about 24,000 parking spaces at the airport.

=== Bus ===
The Transports Metropolitans de Barcelona (TMB) public bus line 46 runs from Paral·lel Avenue. The Aerobús offers direct transfers from T1 and T2 to the city centre at Plaça Catalunya. Another company offers transfers from Barcelona Airport to nearby airports like Reus Airport or Girona–Costa Brava, provincial and national capitals and links with France or Andorra.

=== Ride-hailing ===
Since 2024, the Estonian ride-hailing company Bolt has operated exclusive pickup areas at the airport.

== Incidents and accidents ==
- On 16 May 1940, a Ala Littoria Savoia-Marchetti SM.75 Marsupiale crashed during takeoff because a ladder in the cargo compartment moved during takeoff and jammed the controls. All eight occupants were killed.
- On 14 April 1958, an Aviaco de Havilland Heron crashed into the sea on approach to the airport because of a loss of control to avoid another aircraft taking off from BCN. All two crew and 14 passengers were killed.
- On 8 November 1960, an Iberia Airlines Lockheed 1049 Super Constellation (leased from TWA) was on final approach when the left main gear struck a small heap of rubbish short of the runway threshold, tearing off the wheels, the plane continued 170 m (560 ft) along the runway and swerved to the left and caught fire. All 71 passengers and crew survived, but the aircraft was written off.
- On 22 November 1974, a Cessna Citation I operated by Alpa Servicios Aereos crashed 3 km (1.9 mi) east of Barcelona Airport into the sea because of loss of control of the aircraft. All three occupants died.
- On 19 February 1998, both occupants died in an Ibertrans Fairchild Swearingen Metroliner plane crash in the borough of Gavà shortly after taking off from El Prat.
- On 28 July 1998, a Swiftair Fairchild Swearingen Metroliner crashed on approach, killing both crew members, because of speed reduction at low height, improper flap setting, and a feathered right propeller.

== See also ==
- List of works by Ricardo Bofill Taller de Arquitectura
