= Carola Miró =

Catalan teacher (1965–2024)

Carola Miró i Bedós
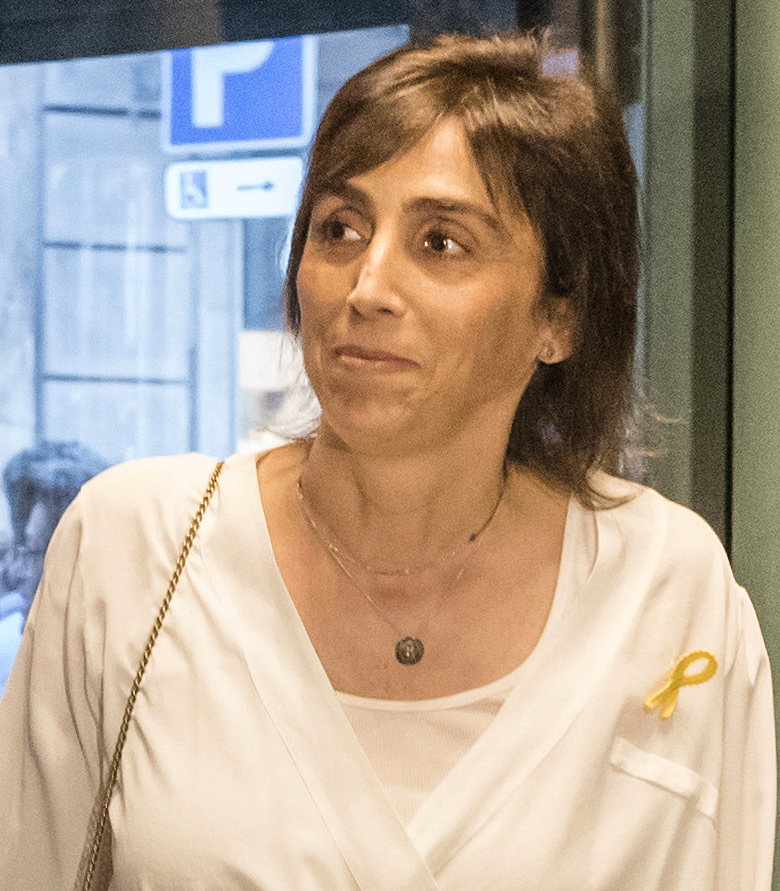

First Lady of the Government of Catalonia
- In office 17 May 2018 – 29 September 2020
- Monarch: Felipe VI

Personal details
- Born: 1965 Barcelona, Spain
- Died: 4 May 2024 (aged 58) Salt, Spain
- Spouse: Quim Torra
- Children: 3
- Occupation: Teacher

Carola Miró i Bedós (1965 – 4 May 2024) was a Spanish Catalan teacher. She was the wife of Quim Torra, who was the 131st President of the Government of Catalonia from 2018 to 2020.

== Biography ==
Miró worked as a teacher at the Thau charter school in Barcelona, which belongs to the Cultural Institution of the Center of Catholic Influence (ICCIC). In 2007, she asked for a leave of absence to live with her family for a year in Switzerland, where her husband worked for the insurance company the Winterthur Group. Miró and Torra had studied together at the St. Ignatius College and had three children.

In the political field, Miró had been part of the association Reagrupament for the demarcation of Barcelona in the 2010 regional election, in 77th position. Ideologically, like her husband, she was a practicing Catholic and a supporter of Catalan independence.

== Illness and death ==
In 2020, Miró was diagnosed with cancer, at which time her husband, then in office as Catalan president, temporarily suspended all of his public agenda. The disease did not remit, and on 4 May 2024, she died at the Hospital Santa Caterina in Salt, having been hospitalised in a very serious condition for some time. She was 58.
