= Eugeni Xammar =

Catalan journalist (1888–1973)

- Eugeni Xammar i Puigventós
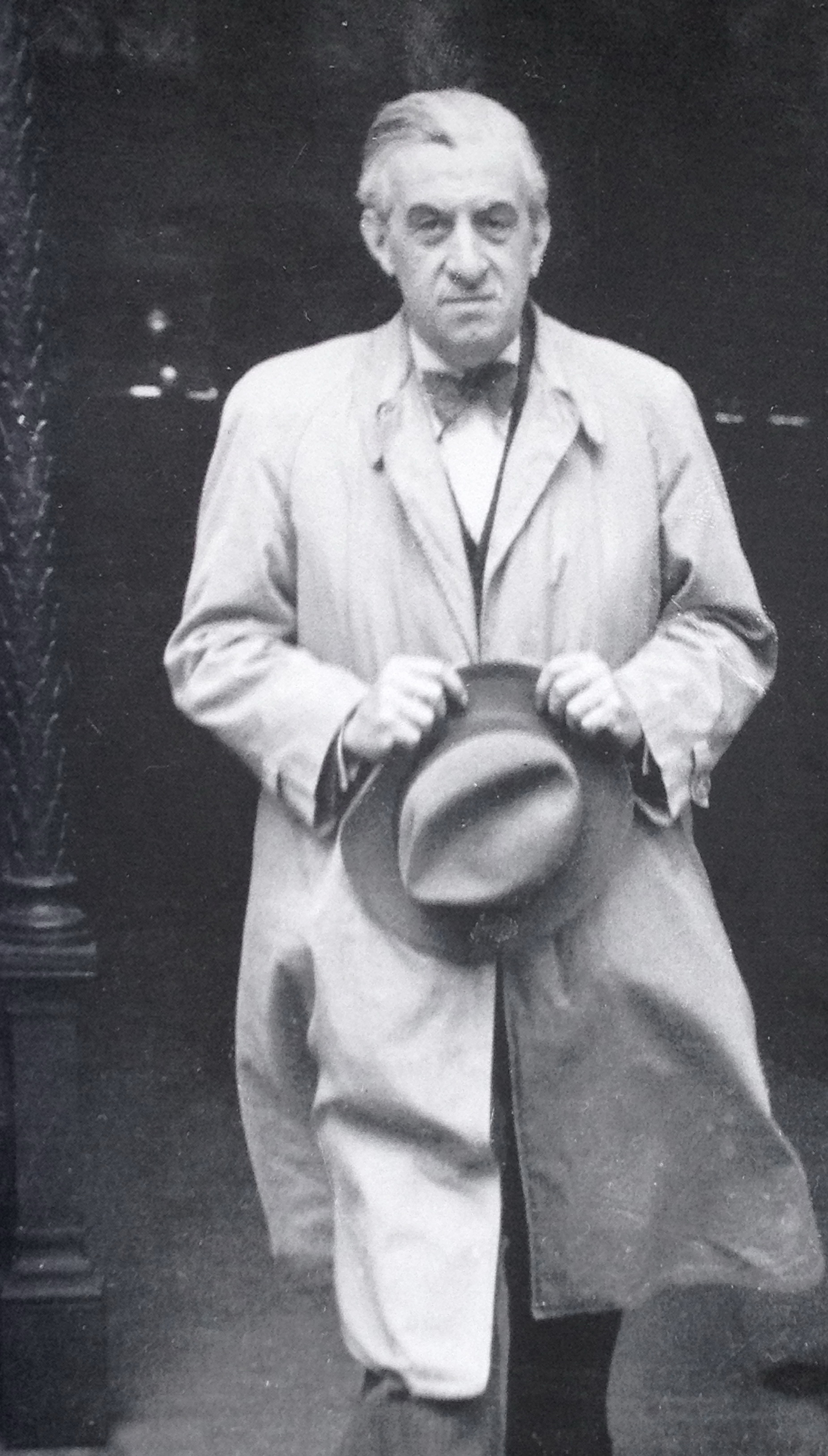
- Eugeni Xammar in 1934
- Born: January 17, 1888; Barcelona
- Died: December 5, 1973 (aged 85); L'Ametlla del Vallès
- Other names: Eugeni Xammar; Douglas Flint (abans de 1909); Harry Doggerel, El Día Gráfico; Peer Grynt, El Be Negre
- Education: self-taught
- Occupation: journalist
- Spouses: Amanda Fürstenwerth; Francine Mesne
- Awards: Premi Crítica Serra d'Or de prosa no-ficció (1975)

Signature
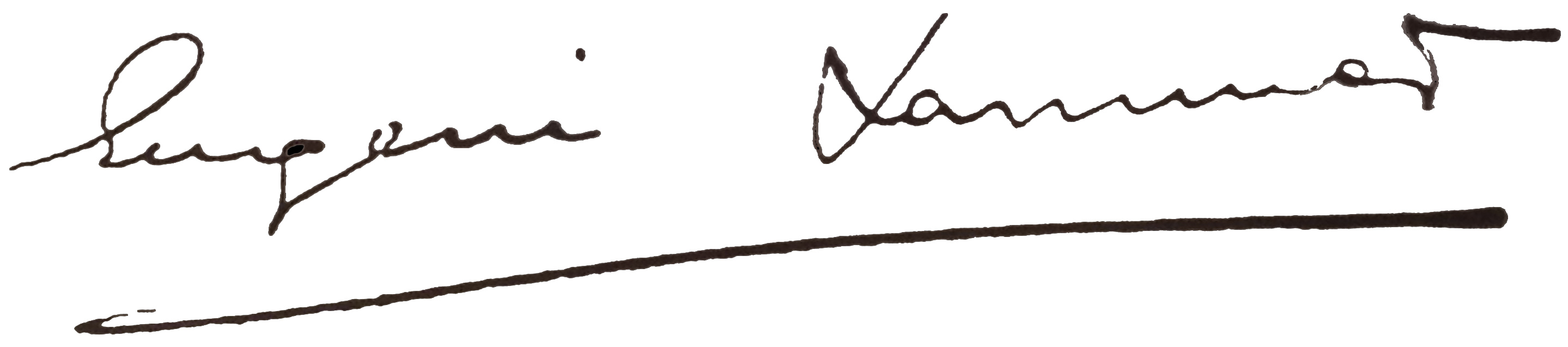

Eugeni Xammar i Puigventós (Barcelona, January 17, 1888 – L'Ametlla del Vallès, December 5, 1973) was an international journalist, career diplomat, and polyglot translator (he spoke seven languages and wrote five) who lived most of his life outside of Catalonia as a correspondent in Europe during the stormy, unstable years of the First and Second World Wars.

He worked as a correspondent in Buenos Aires, Paris, Madrid, London, Berlin, Washington DC, and Geneva, and traveled to Italy, Russia, and Austria, among others. As a correspondent, he collaborated principally with Catalan media outlets, writing in Catalan, like La Publicitat, La Veu de Catalunya, or Mirador magazine, which he complemented with activities in Spanish in South American publications and the Madrid-based newspaper Ahora. His mastery of languages allowed him to work as a translator for international organizations like the UN, WHO, World Bank, and FAO.

His longest assignment was in Berlin, between 1922 and 1936, during the Weimar Republic, when Xammar published in 1923 an alleged interview of Hitler, the first known such of the future Führer, in which he explains how he was incubating what he called "the serpent's egg". Eighty years later, the authenticity of this interview was called into question by Lluís Permanyer and Albert Sánchez Piñol. These are the years in which he coincided with Josep Pla who was also a correspondent and with whom he maintained a lifelong friendship. From Berlin, he narrated the repercussions of the First World War on the German populace that led to the evolution of Nazism and Hitler's arrival to power.

Always committed to the Republic and to the Government of the Generalitat de Catalunya, of which he was a representative in Paris during the postwar period under President Irla, his actions led to Francoist reprisals and extradition, as well as the disappearance of his name and his work for an entire generation of students until his posthumous memoir was published in the mid 1970s.

Xammar defined himself as a democrat, Republican, and Catalanist. He stated: "when it comes to Catalonia, I have never taken precautions". He was very critical of those who, despite sharing positions like his own, considered themselves "non-belligerents" with the postwar Francoist regime, like for example the intellectuals who contributed to Destino magazine, despite it being a key liberal, Catalanist, democratic source of the times.

== Biography ==
Although he was born in Barcelona, in 1900 he moved with his mother and his brother Josep Maria to the Can Xammar de Dalt manor house in Almetlla del Vallès. The property, which had been the third most important one in the municipality, had fallen into ruin due to Phylloxera, when his mother, the widow of Ramon Xammar, inherited it.

His mother tried to save the mostly rural property, renting rooms to Barcelonians who spent summers outside of the city, and the custom became widespread and turned Almetlla into a summer resort during the first third of the 20th century. But it was not enough, and two years after arriving, the still adolescent Eugeni Xammar had to decide whether to accept the challenge suggested by his mother of becoming a farmer and continuing the family business. His restless temperament kept him from any kind of farm-related vocation, and he answered that "whether farming or managing a farm, living in Ametlla for my whole life doesn't appeal to me in the slightest".

When he was 14, his mother told him they would finish the winter in Ametlla and then work in Barcelona, in the cotton business Sucesores de B. Brutau. Four years later, his mother was forced to sell the farm at a loss to another cotton industrialist, Joan Millet i Pagès, brother of the director of the Orfeó Català, Lluís Millet. From that moment on, the property was rebaptized with the name Can Millet. This was not the only change, since the new owner hired the modernist architect in fashion in the area, Manuel Joaquim Raspall, to remodel the place. Xammar was flabbergasted when he saw the new look, and he wrote, "A touch of Raspall—to call it that—was all that was needed to transform a magnificent, gigantic farmhouse, with two sides, into a sort of inedible Easter Egg that to this day still frightens any sensible person."

In August 1909, he took advantage of the 1500 pesetas that his aunt had given him to pay to get out of his military service in order to take a trip to Paris to polish his French while he took on all manner of jobs in order to survive. It's not clear whether he went to make a break with the environment of Barcelona during the Tragic Week of 1909, that he was already reflecting upon in his columns in El Poble Català, or if it was to get out of doing military service.

He returned from Paris, passing quickly through Catalonia, before heading on to Argentina, a country that he found distressing and that he left three months later to go back to Paris where he lived for two years, between 1910 and 1912, living a Bohemian life.

Next he began work as a newspaper correspondent that led him to live in various countries without returning to Barcelona until 1917, due to his mother having a serious illness, which kept him in Barcelona until 1918. Between 1918 and 1936, he lived in Paris, Madrid, Geneva, and Berlin.

== Marriages ==
At the end of 1922 in Berlin, Xammar married Amanda Fürstenwerth Goetsche, a cultured German woman with whom he lived until her death in 1969, after an operation on her femur.

In the last years of their marriage, Xammar had a French lover 40 years his junior, Francine Mesne, employed by the UNESCO in Paris, who became his second wife on May 2, 1970 in Santa Maria de Llerona (Vallès Oriental). His few friends attended the wedding, including Josep Badia and the musician Josep Maria Ruera i Pinart, who played the Catalan Anthem, Els Segadors, at the doors of the church. The pair made their home in Paris, but just a few months later, Xammar's health deteriorated due to a violent attack of Zoster Herpes that evolved into long, aching pain between his ribs. After a few months, on February 22, 1971, he tripped and broke his femur. He was operated on in Paris at the age of 83, and his wife Francine, unwilling to take care of an old man, sent him to his home in Ametlla. She stayed in Paris and visited him on a few occasions before his death.

== Last years in Ametlla ==
Despite the short stay during his youth in Ametlla del Vallès, Xammar always returned to the town when he was passing through Catalonia. He was always clear that he wanted to end up in the town in which he had refused to be a farmer, and which would have limited his freedom of movement. He thought, however, that he would fulfill that objective after a few years of globetrotting, like his friend Josep Pla explained to him in a letter at the end of the 1920s: "However closed the paths may seem, I have the impression that in three years at the most, things will have changed and we will meet once again in Catalonia. I think I'll be able to save 12,000 marks this year that I can devote to buying land in Ametlla—and I confess the fact that I'm starting to miss it. Next year, I want to return to Catalonia no matter what, paying off my military service beforehand, of course, if I could stay, I would stay." Even though he didn't have his own house, he took advantage of any opportunity of talking up the town, like in 1931 when he brought the Civil Governor from the new Republican government, Carlos Esplá, accompanied by the journalist Francisco Madrid on an excursion to Ametlla.

His dreams didn't come true until 1932, the year in which he bought Can Feliu, with a small house and a little bit of land, on the edge of the town limits. The purchase coincided with the beginning of the Republic, a fact that Xammar underscores when he describes the house in his memoirs. The text describes a property of a limited size, a small house almost in ruins, and ends up showing his desire to return, despite all of that: "But all of that was nothing compared to becoming once again a property owner in Ametlla del Vallès and a resident in the town where he had to pay taxes (few) and gotten to vote when the elections came around." From that moment on, he began to visit Catalonia more frequently and began to recover some of his friends from his youth.

At the beginning of the civil war, he was in Berlin and in October, 1940, a Barcelona judge ordered the 'confiscation of all the goods and the perpetual estrangement from national territory of Mr. Eugenio Xammar for being a red and a Catalanist'. This event condemned him to a long exile up until 1950 and the loss of his beloved house in Catalonia. Years later, Fèlix Millet i Maristany, the new owner of Can Xammar de Dalt, helped him get it back. After 1960, Xammar's life basically was centered in Ametlla in a kind of internal exile, refusing to write as a badge of loyalty to an imprisoned Catalonia. It is a period in which he alternates between stays in Fonda Europa in Granollers, which belonged to the Parellada family, with which he maintained a great friendship. Many of his peers, including Jaume Miravitlles or Avel·lí Artís-Gener, visited his house in recognition of his professional prowess and the exemplariness of his ideological independence.

His last years were characterized by his fight against the herpes-which caused pain and restricted his mobility. As he described it in his memoir, 'Each day I was less and less motivated to move, especially in the winter, I come and go from a very comfortable bed to a very comfortable seat and from a spacious bedroom to an ample bathroom.' His finances had always been limited, but during his last years he had serious economic problems. Once again it was Josep Badia who helped him by finding a local gentleman, Maties Barres, who gave him a lifelong pension for his house, Can Feliu, and with that, he was able to live out his last days.

He died in Ametlla del Vallès, where he is buried, on December 5, 1973.

== Career ==
Xammar's concern for broadening his knowledge from his basic studies drove him to educate himself. When he returned to Barcelona to work in the textile industry, he joined the CADCI. While he improved his studies, he read the classics, wrote poetry, practiced his favorite sport—soccer—became an expert at billiards and played Basque pelota. He combined attendance at concerts at the Liceu with his participation as a member on the jury of the Jocs Florals de Rubí, or with the composition of a poem that would become the words to 'Nocturn musicat' by the founder of the Orfeó Gracienc, Joan Balcells. The piece was performed for the first time by Balcells himself at the Palau de la Música in 1949.

It is at the CADCI where he received his formation at a moment in which Catalonia struggled to make education one of the country's foundations. Xammar understood and tied Catalanism to education and in one of his articles titled 'Catalan education' (La Tralla, October 1, 1904), he demanded nationalist formation, criticizing the universities, 'ruled by professors, the cleverest of which wasn't smartest enough to pull a cart' and he demanded the creation of Catalan schools in order to 'marginalize the vulgar Spanish primary education that we have'.

== Bibliography ==
- "Eugeni Xammar: La ploma silenciada". Aj. Ametlla del Vallès. 2013.
- Assia, Augusto (15 April 1973). "Augusto Assia: 44 años de corresponsal en las páginas de "La Vanguardia"". La Vanguardia (in Spanish).
- Badia, Josep (1992). Galeria de personatges. Cròniques del nostre temps (1900-1990). L'Ametlla del Vallès: Ajuntament de l'Ametlla del Vallès.
- Badia, Carles; Pla, Xavier; Planas, Jordi (2000). "L'Ametlla del Vallès: naixença i creixença d'un poble d'estiueig". Lauro (núm. 19). Granollers: 29.
- Bonada, Lluis (4 April 2000). "Eugeni Xammar y Josep Pla conspiraron en 1924 para matar a Alfonso XIII". El País (in Spanish).
- Canosa, Francesc (2011). "Eugeni Xammar". LletraA. Barcelona.
- Canosa, Francesc (2006). "Eugeni Xammar: un superperiodista sobrevolant el futur". Trípodos (núm. 20). Facultat de Comunicació Blanquerna. ISSN 2340-5007.
- Escardó, J. (1903-09-27). "Notícies sobre FCB". Los Deportes (in Spanish) (núm.39): pàg. 617.
- Espada, Arcadi (28 November 2005). "Una exclusiva (e)vidente". El País (in Spanish).
- Farràs i Giol, Núria (October 2013). "El Xammar més proper" (PDF). Amindola (núm. 8). Archived from the original (PDF) on 20 October 2013.
- Pla, Josep (1979). Notes del capvesprol (1. ed.). Barcelona: Edicions Destino. ISBN 9788423309788.
- Pla, Josep (2004). "Caps-i-puntes". Obra completa (Vol. 43 ed.). Barcelona: Destino. p. 280.
- Roig, Montserrat (February 1972). "El senyor Eugeni Xammar, un llop sentimental i escèptic". Serra d'Or (núm. 149): 11–14.
- Safont, Joan (January–March 2012). "Eugeni Xammar i la revista aliadòfila Iberia (1915-1919)" (PDF). Diàlegs: núm. 55.
- Torra, Quim (2008). Periodisme? Permetin!: La vida i els articles d'Eugeni Xammar. Sant Cugat de Vallès: Símbol editors. ISBN 978-84-95987-63-1.
- Torra, Quim (2007). "Retorn a Eugeni Xammar". Ponències: 123–156. ISSN 1137-9626.
- Torra, Quim (18 October 2013). "Modernitat, catalanisme i cosmopolitisme". El Punt Avui.
- Tängerstad, Erik (March 2007). "Tängerstad on Xammar, El huevo del la serpiente:Cronicas desde Alemania (1922-1924) and Cronicas desde Berlin (1930-36)". H-Net German.
- Xammar, Eugeni (17 November 1923). "El cop d'estat com a espectacle". La Veu de Catalunya: pàg. 5. Archived from the original on 4 February 2016.
