= Democratic Tsunami =

Catalan protest group advocating for independence

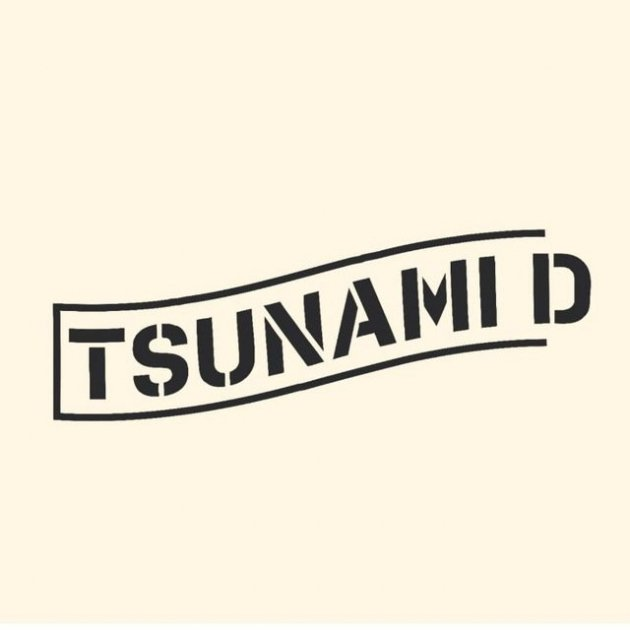
- Formation: c. August 2019
- Type: Protest group; Voluntary association
- Purpose: Rights, freedom, and exercise the right of self-determination for Catalonia; Internet activism
- Region served: Catalonia
- Members: Unknown, under investigation by Spanish Authorities
- Website: https://tsunamidemocratic.github.io/

Democratic Tsunami (Catalan: Tsunami Democràtic, pronounced [suˈnami ðəmuˈkɾatik]) was a Catalan protest group advocating a self-determination referendum in Catalonia, formed and organized in the lead up to the final judgement on the Trial of the Catalonia independence leaders. It organizes supporters of the Catalan independence movement through the use of social media, apps and other online resources. It used a 'bespoke' Android app, along with a Telegram account with over 410,000 followers in order to mobilize and organize demonstrations during the 2019 Catalan protests. Distributed outside of the official market for Android apps, the application (making use of overseas servers) circumvents the European legislation for data protection in regards of geolocalization.

== Goals ==
As stated in press notes and interviews, their objectives are the freedom of prisoners, exiles and reprisals; defense of fundamental rights and the self-determination of Catalonia. In a statement following the judgment of the trial of the Catalonia independence leaders, read by Pep Guardiola, they defended the rights of assembly and demonstration, freedom of expression and the right to a fair trial. They also held an independence referendum similar to that of Quebec or Scotland, and called on the international community to position itself for a "conflict resolution based on dialogue and respect."

They defend civil disobedience and nonviolence.

== History ==
=== Activity ===
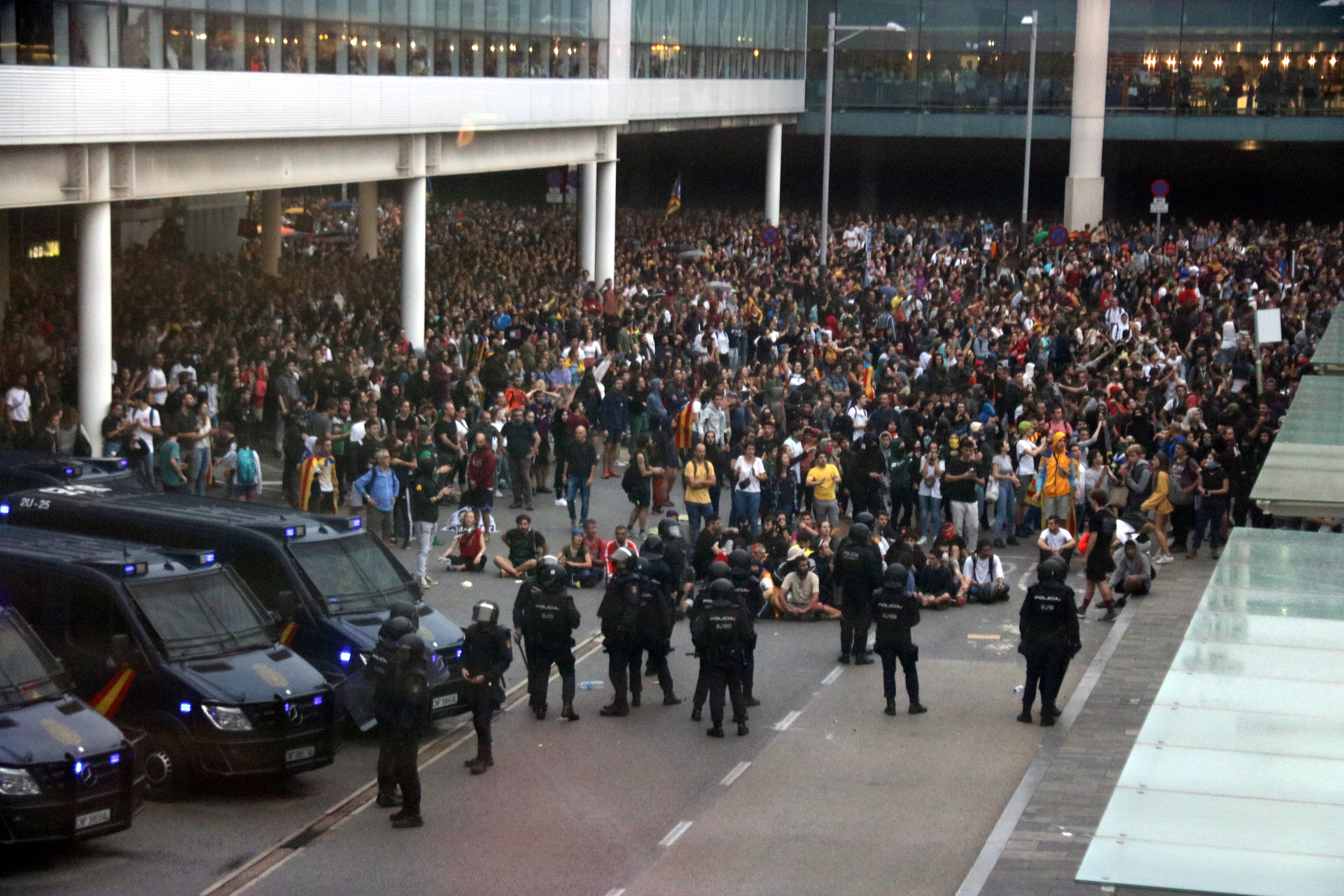
14 October, Barcelona airport Terminal 1 during the demonstration

In one of its first actions, the group managed to organize a large protest at Barcelona Airport, which led to a major disruption and the cancellation of over 100 flights.

The group endorses nonviolence and has supported occupation of government buildings and other protest acts, which were condemned by the Spanish government. The group's actions appear to mimic those of the 2019–20 Hong Kong protests, which also occupied a key airport. The group also used similar language to the Hong Kong Protesters, urging protesters to "add up like drops of water".

The group managed to assert itself as one of the main organizers of the 2019 Catalan protests.

=== Origin and identity ===
The group's identity is unknown as none of the group's members has publicly shown their identity as of October 2019. The group however insists that it has no links to other pro-independence groups or political parties in Catalonia, stating that its name was derived from an expression used by pardoned Catalan independence leader Jordi Cuixart. It added that it followed a doctrine of strict non-violence, instead advocating for "mass civil disobedience".

Swiss publication Le Temps, along with the Spanish Press, alleged that the movement was founded in late August 2019 after a meeting in the Geneva countryside. It was allegedly attended by leading Catalan independence leaders, including Catalan President Quim Torra and his predecessor Carles Puigdemont, as well as two Swiss politicians which supported the idea of Catalan independence. The Associated Press, on the other hand, pegged the group's creation under similar conditions in July 2019 with the endorsement of top pro-independence officials.

== Protest app ==
The movement created a mobile app, which was released as a sideload for devices running Android. The app organizes and mobilizes small, localized groups of supporters to carry out protest acts across the entire territory of Catalonia. It allows the Democratic Tsunami to monitor and give directions to individual protesters or groups of protesters, while claiming that the user's location is approximated and obfuscated to avoid police tracking. It also required the user to activate it by scanning a QR code, a measure intended to limit activation to "stages" in order to avoid infiltration by government authorities. For the same reason, users are allowed to invite only one other person to the app, and even successfully invited and activated users can only see protests within their immediate vicinity. The group announced that it had 15,000 successful QR code activations as of 17 October, 3 days after the beginning of the protests.

== Prosecution by the Spanish Government ==
On 18 October 2019, a Spanish Judge ordered the closure of several web pages belonging to the group. The group immediately migrated it's homepage to a new address. It later published instructions on how to "avoid Spanish censorship". Spain's interior minister, Fernando Grande-Marlaska stated that the Spanish Authorities had launched an investigation aiming to discover the individuals behind the group. The Spanish Government was reportedly looking into whether or not Carles Puigdemont was behind the group. The group refused to comment on the allegation, while Puigdemont denied it and stated that he did not know who the organizers were.

Spain sent a takedown request to GitHub, demanding the Tsunami Democràtic app to be removed and defining the organization "as a criminal organization driving people to commit terrorist attacks". GitHub complied but published the takedown request in one of their public repositories.

== See also ==
- Trial of Catalonia independence leaders
