= Ibertrans Aérea =

Spanish passenger and cargo airline

IATA	ICAO	Call sign
-	IBT	IBERTRANS
- Founded: 1991
- Ceased operations: 2009
- Hubs: Madrid Barajas International Airport
- Fleet size: 4
- Headquarters: Madrid, Spain
- Website: ibertrans.net

Ibertrans Aérea was an airline based in Madrid, Spain. It was established in 1991 and operated passenger and cargo services, including charters and wet leases for other airlines. Its main base was Madrid Barajas International Airport.

== Fleet ==
The Ibertrans Aérea fleet included the following aircraft (at March 2007):

- 1 Embraer EMB 120ER Brasilia
- 1 Embraer EMB 120RT Brasilia
- 2 Fairchild Merlin IV

== Accidents ==
- On 19 February 1998, two people, the commander and the pilot died when an Ibertrans general aviation plane crash in the borough of Gavà shortly after taking off from Barcelona's international airport.
