= Quim Torra =

Former president of Catalonia (born 1962)

The Right Honourable Quim Torra
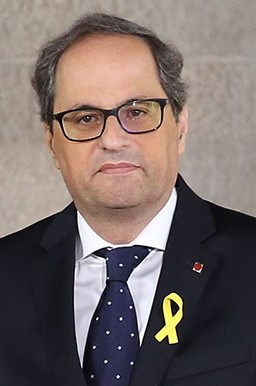
- Official portrait, 2018

131st President of the Government of Catalonia
- In office 17 May 2018 – 29 September 2020
- Monarch: Felipe VI
- Vice President: Pere Aragonès
- Preceded by: Direct rule Carles Puigdemont (until 28 October 2017)
- Succeeded by: Pere Aragonès

Member of the Catalan Parliament for the Province of Barcelona
- In office 17 January 2018 – 27 January 2020

President of Òmnium Cultural
- In office 21 July 2015 – 19 December 2015
- Preceded by: Muriel Casals
- Succeeded by: Jordi Cuixart

Personal details
- Born: Joaquim Torra i Pla; 28 December 1962 (age 63) Blanes, Catalonia, Spain
- Party: Together for Catalonia (since 2020)
- Other political affiliations: Reagrupament; Democratic Union of Catalonia (until 2017); Independent (2017–2020)
- Spouse: Carola Miró (died 2024)
- Children: 3
- Education: Autonomous University of Barcelona
- Occupation: Lawyer and editor

Joaquim Torra i Pla (Catalan: [ʒu.əˈkim ˈtorə i pla]; born 28 December 1962), known as Quim Torra, is a Catalan lawyer and journalist from Spain. He served as President of the Government of Catalonia from 17 May 2018 to 28 September 2020, when the Supreme Court of Spain confirmed a court ruling by the High Court of Justice of Catalonia condemning him for disobeying the Central Electoral Board during the April 2019 general election, leading to his disqualification from office.

Born in Blanes, Torra graduated from the Autonomous University of Barcelona before joining the legal profession. He worked as executive for a multinational insurance company for twenty years before starting his own publishing company. He later held senior positions for the City of Barcelona and Generalitat de Catalunya.

A supporter of Catalan independence, and former member of Democratic Union of Catalonia and Reagrupament, Torra did not currently belong to any political party from 2017 to 2020. He has held senior positions in several pro-independence organisations including the Òmnium Cultural and Assemblea Nacional Catalana. He was elected to the Parliament of Catalonia at the 2017 regional election as an independent candidate for the pro-independence Together for Catalonia electoral alliance. In May 2018, he was elected 131st president of the Government of Catalonia, after the Spanish courts blocked three other candidates.

== Early life and family ==
Torra was born on 28 December 1962 in Blanes, a town in the Province of Girona in north-eastern Catalonia (Spain). He is the third of four children (three boys and one girl). His family were originally from Santa Coloma de Farners but moved to Blanes where his father, also known as Quim Torra, worked as an engineer at the Sociedad Anónima de Fibras Artificiales (SAFA) plant. The family then moved to Barcelona where Torra's father worked as a manager for SAFA. Torra was educated at St. Ignatius College, Barcelona, better known as Jesuïtes Sarrià.

Torra joined the Autonomous University of Barcelona in 1980, graduating in 1985 with a degree in law. His parents later returned to Santa Coloma de Farners where his father was a municipal councillor in 1991 and where his widowed mother still lives.

== Professional career ==
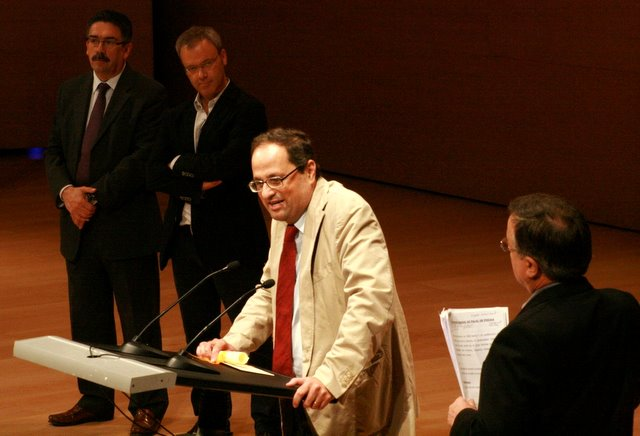
Torra receiving the Carles Rahola award in October 2009

Torra worked as an executive for Winterthur Group, a multinational insurance company, for nearly twenty years including two years at the company's offices in the Canton of Zürich in Switzerland. Whilst in Switzerland he started researching Eugeni Xammar, a Catalan journalist who worked for the United Nations, igniting a passion for Catalan journalism during the 1920s and 1930s. When AXA took over Winterthur Torra was offered a position in Madrid but he chose to return to Catalonia to devote himself to journalism and publishing.

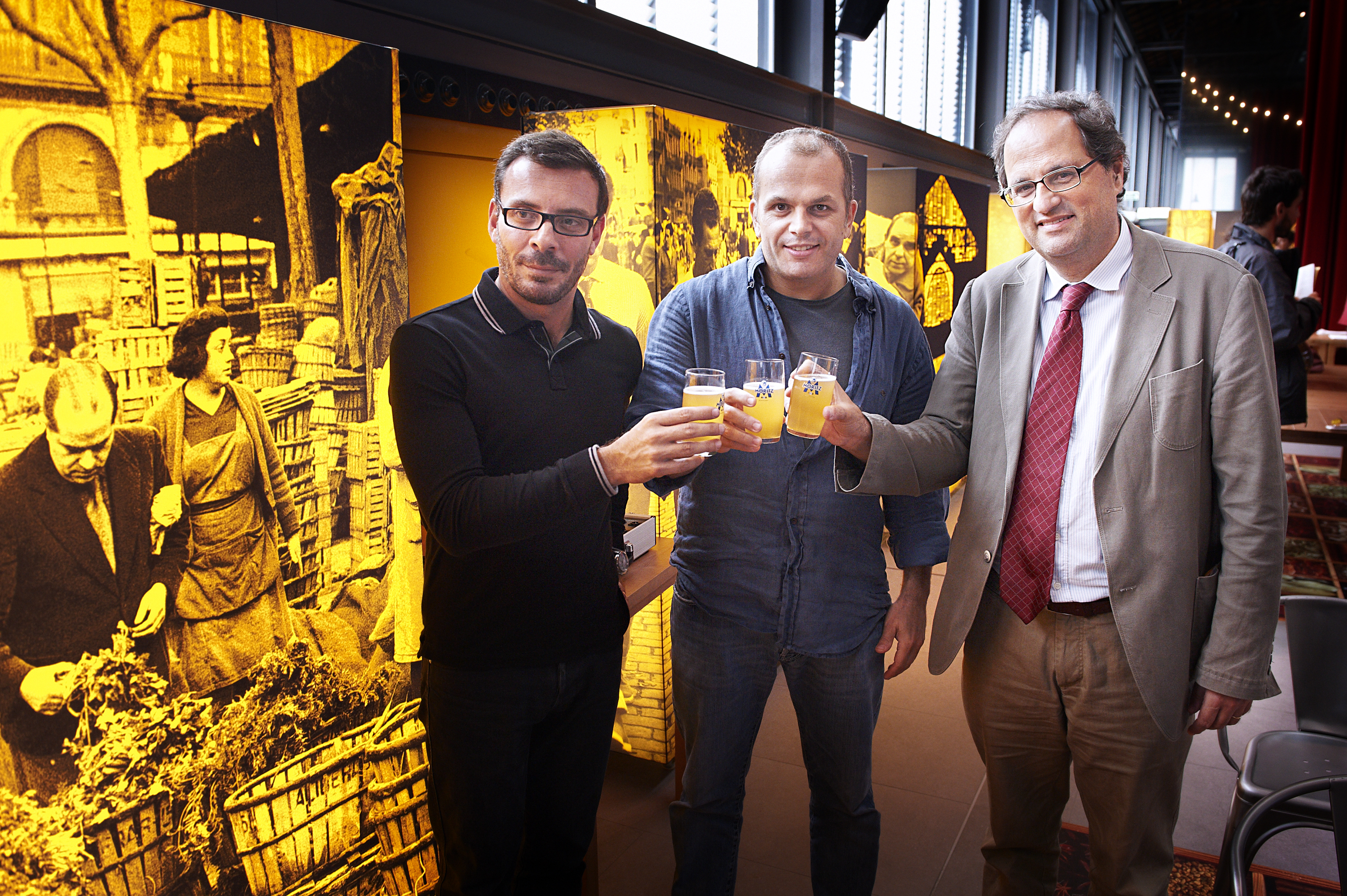
Torra at the opening of the d'El 300 del Born restaurant in September 2013

In 2008 Torra founded A Contra Vent Editors, a publisher specialising in literary and humorous journalism, focusing on the revival of Catalonia's literary and journalistic tradition during the 1920s and 1930s. Torra has written several books on the history of Catalonia, journalism and biographies and in 2009 he won the "Carles Rahola" award for "Viatge Involuntari a la Catalunya Impossible", an essay on the history of Catalan journalism that mixes fact and fiction to narrate the life of several Catalan journalists during the Second Spanish Republic, including Just Cabot, Lluís Capdevila, Àngel Ferran, Manuel Fontdevila and Francisco Madrid. He has also written articles for the Ara, El Punt Avui, El Temps and Nació Digital.

From September 2011 to 2015, during the mayorship of Xavier Trias, Torra was in charge of promoting the district of Ciutat Vella as director of Foment de Ciutat Vella, SA. In June 2012 he became director of the Born Centre de Cultura i Memòria but in September 2015, shortly after Ada Colau became mayor, he left the organisation. He was appointed director of Revista de Catalunya in May 2015. He was director of the Generalitat's Center for Contemporary Subject Studies from March 2016 to October 2017. He is currently working as a lawyer and is a member of the Bar Association of Barcelona.

== Activism and politics ==
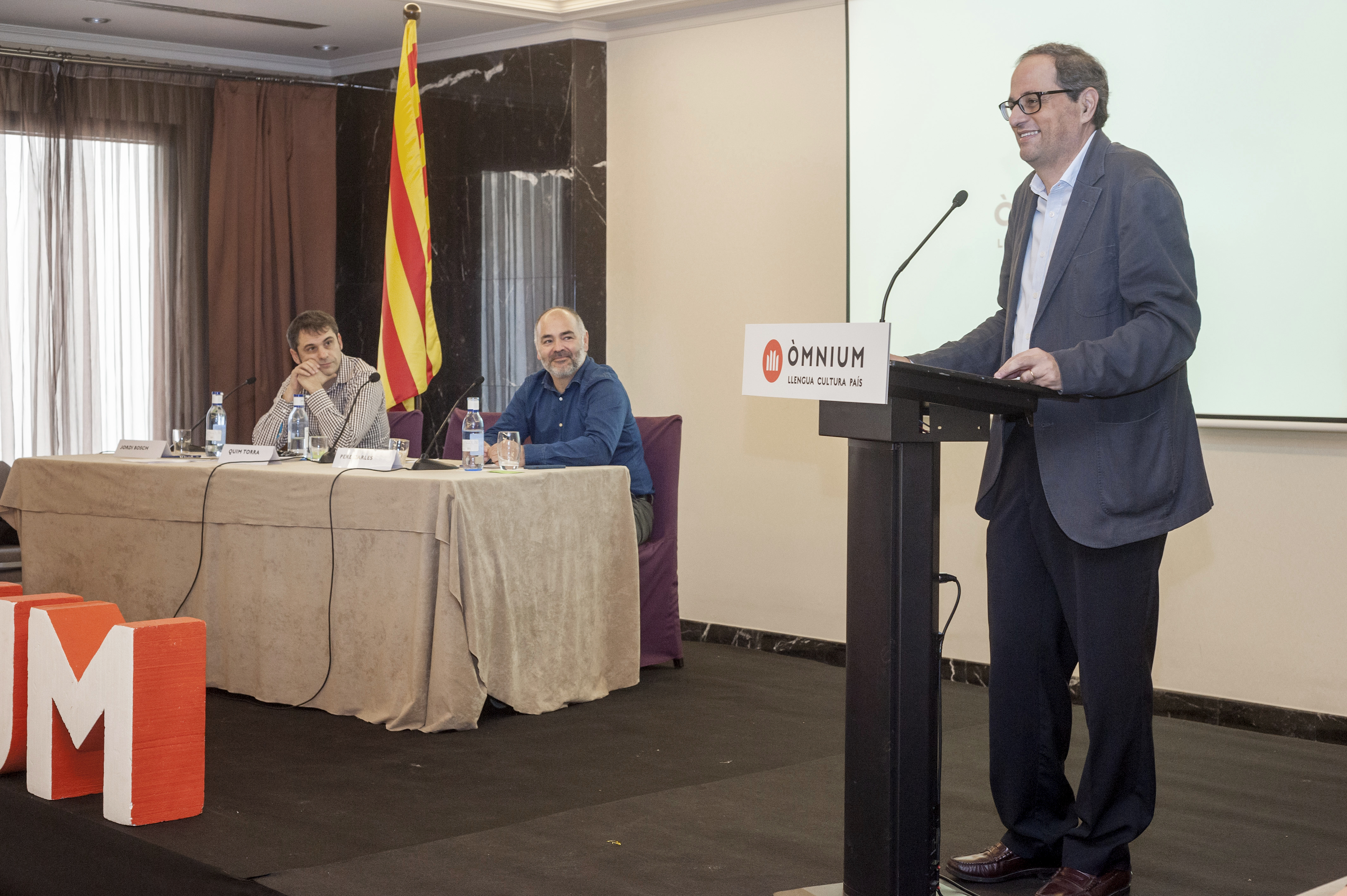
Torra speaking at the Òmnium Cultural's general assembly in December 2015

Torra is a member of the pro-Catalan independence Òmnium Cultural (OC), of which he was vice-president from 2013 to 2015, and Assemblea Nacional Catalana (ANC). He was president of the pro-independence Sobirania i Justícia from 2010 to 2011 and a member of the permanent council of the ANC in 2012. In 2011 Torra and lawyer Jordi Cortada filed a lawsuit before the European Court of Human Rights against the Constitutional Court's re-writing of the Statute of Autonomy of Catalonia. When the OC president, Muriel Casals i Couturier, was chosen as a candidate for the 2015 Catalan regional election Torra was appointed as president in July 2015, serving until December 2015 when he was replaced by Jordi Cuixart.

Torra was associated with the Democratic Union of Catalonia (UDC), a regionalist center-right party, and later Reagrupament, a splinter group of the left-wing pro-independence Republican Left of Catalonia (ERC). Torra is not a member of any political party and is known to have reservations about certain policies of the Catalan European Democratic Party (PDeCAT), the main constituent of the pro-independence Together for Catalonia (JuntsxCat) electoral alliance. He is believed to be on good terms with the left-wing pro-independence Popular Unity Candidacy (CUP) which is not a member of JuntsxCat.

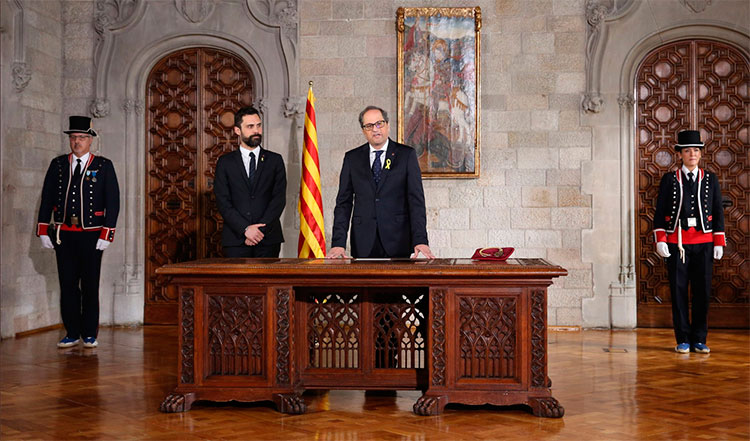
Installation of Torra as President of Catalonia on 17 May 2018

Torra contested the 2017 regional election as an independent JuntsxCat candidate in the Province of Barcelona and was elected to the Parliament of Catalonia. At the election Catalan secessionists retained a slim majority in the Catalan Parliament. Attempts by the secessionists to inaugurate three candidates – Carles Puigdemont, Jordi Sànchez and Jordi Turull – as President of Catalonia were thwarted by the Spanish courts. In May 2018 Torra, the so-called "plan D", was nominated as candidate for president. At the investiture vote held on 12 May 2018 Torra secured 66 votes (JuntsxCat 34; ERC–CatSí 32) with 65 votes against (Cs 36; PSC 17; CatComú–Podem 8; PP 4) and four abstentions (CUP-CC 4), failing to achieve the 68 votes necessary for an absolute majority. As a result, a second vote was held on 14 May 2018 at which he only needed a simple majority to become president. The result of the second vote was exactly the same as the first vote – 66 in favour, 65 against and four abstentions – and as a result Torra was elected the 131st President of Catalonia. He was sworn in on 17 May 2018. On 19 May he appointed his government, which included as regional ministers, Jordi Turull and Josep Rull (in preventive custody) as well as Toni Comín and Lluís Puig, in self-imposed exile in Belgium and also required by the Spanish justice. Since article 155 was still in force, Mariano Rajoy decided not to publish the appointments in the Generalitat government gazette, which led to a criminal complaint for prevarication brought by President Torra. In order to avoid extending the application of article 155, on 29 May President Torra appointed a new government, which took office on 2 June, which ended a period of seven months of direct rule on Catalonia from Madrid.

In December 2018, Torra announced a 48-hour fast in solidarity with the prisoners of Lledoners who were carrying out a hunger strike, Jordi Sànchez, Jordi Turull, Joaquim Forn and Josep Rull.

=== Controversial writings ===
The tone and content of some articles written by Torra in 2012 criticizing anti-Catalanism and Spain have elicited strong criticism from numerous sectors. Critics have accused Torra of being xenophobic and a supremacist. In an online editorial, he metaphorically described people who live in Catalonia but reject Catalan-nationalism and culture as "beasts" or "scavengers, vipers, hyenas", who have "a little bump in their DNA chain". In addition, several tweets from 2012 that he later removed included sentences like "Spaniards only know how to plunder" and "Spaniards in Catalonia are like energy – they transform themselves but do not disappear".

At European level, the President of the Alliance of Liberals and Democrats for Europe group, Hans van Baalen condemned his rhetoric as "separatist and racist" and the Party of European Socialists stated that "his racist remarks are utterly disgusting and cast deep doubts about his fitness for the job". The Catalan chapter of French NGO SOS Racisme also criticized the tone of the articles, but stated they cannot be considered racism. Torra apologised for the tweets after being nominated to be president.

=== Judicial case and disqualification ===
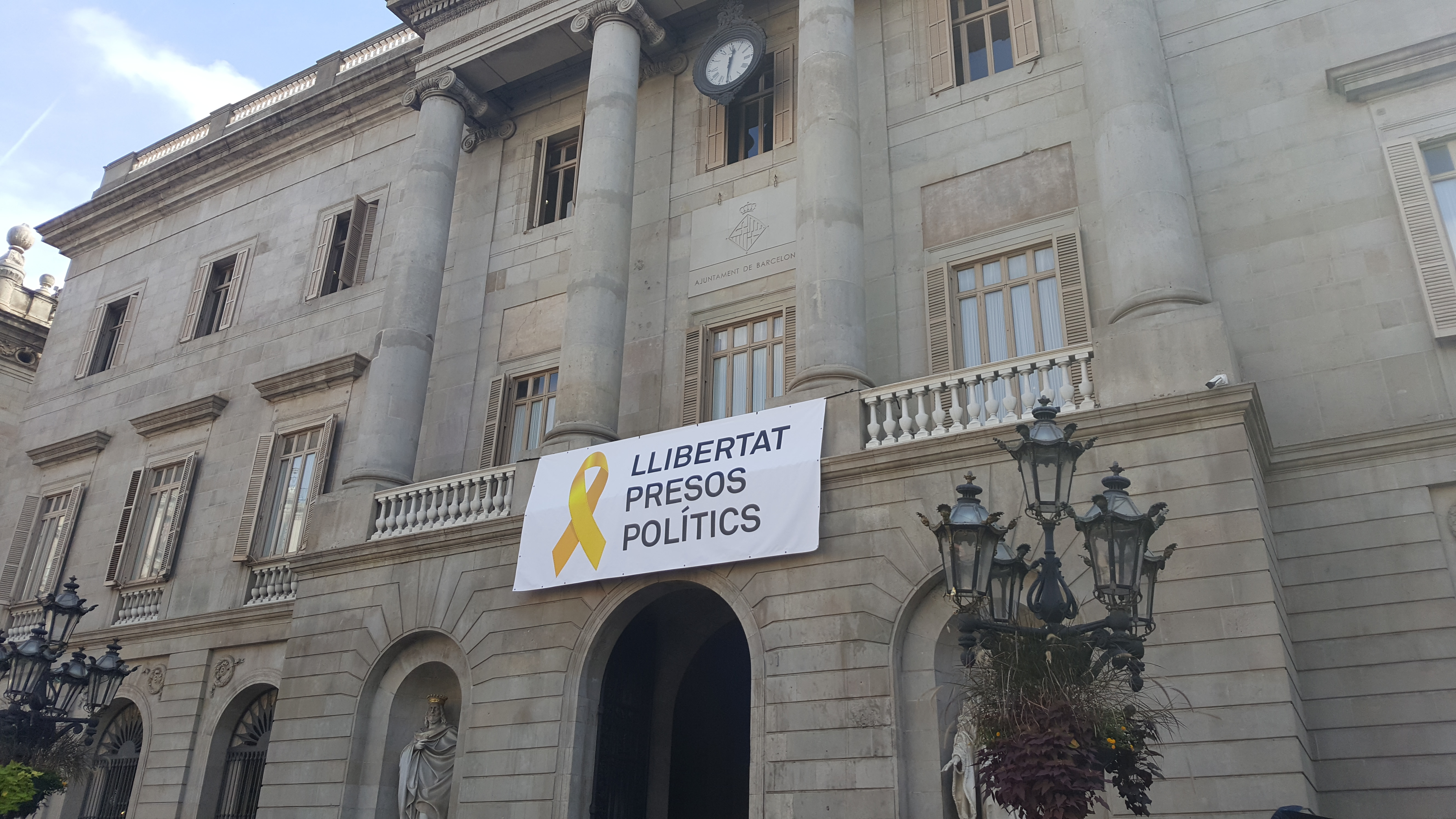
"Freedom Political Prisoners" (see Trial of Catalonia independence leaders) sign hung at the Barcelona City Hall, a similar one would be hung on the balcony of the Palau de la Generalitat by Torra from June 2018 to March 2019 and again from May to September 2019, when it was ultimately ordered removed by mandamus after Torra's refusal.

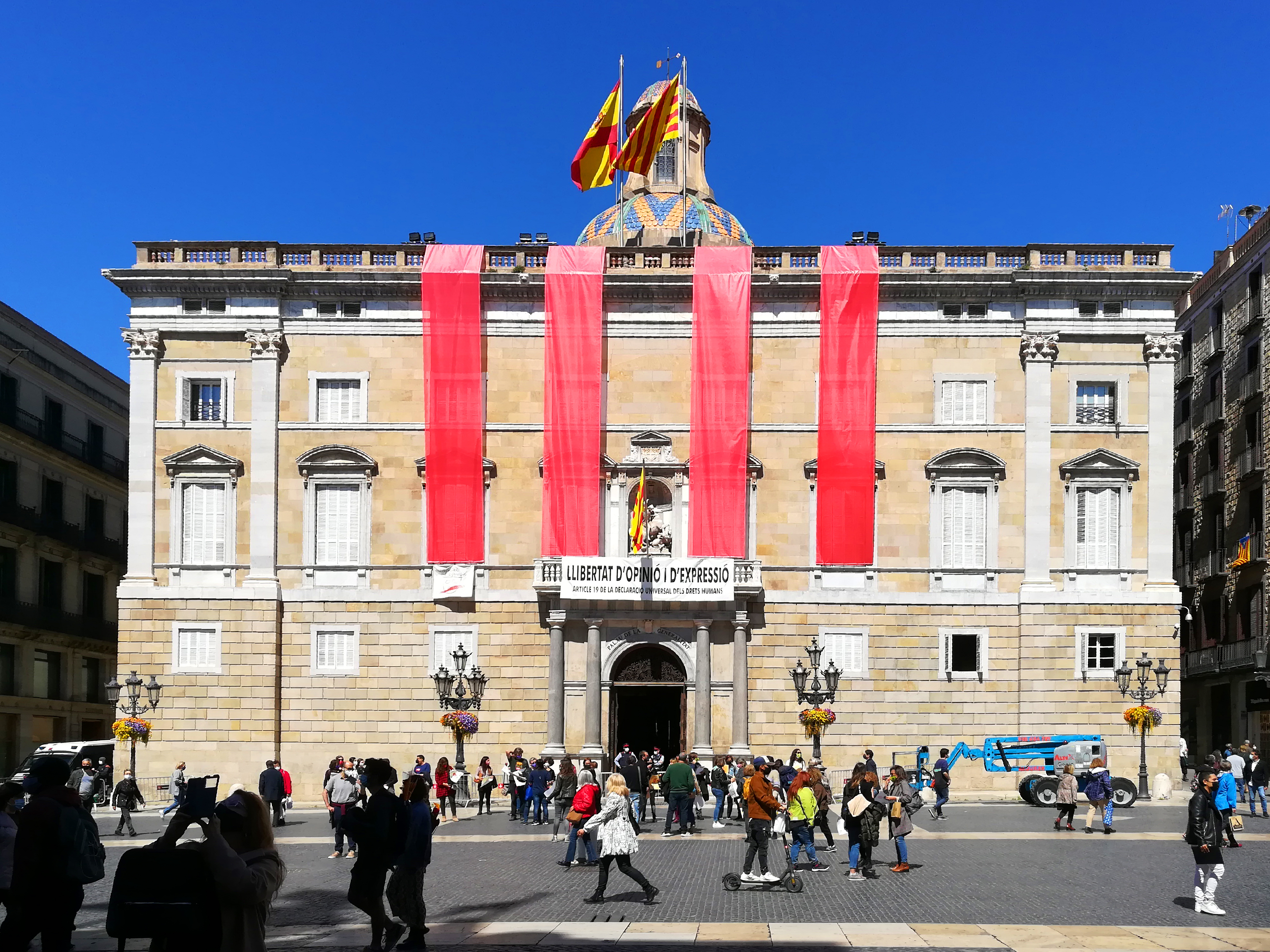
"Freedom of Opinion and Expression. Article 19 of the Universal Declaration of Human Rights" sign from March to May 2019 after the previous sign was considered partisan by the High Court of Justice of Catalonia.

On 19 December 2019, Torra was sentenced by the High Court of Justice of Catalonia (TSJC) to a year and a half of disqualification (inhabilitación) from holding any elected office and/or from exercising government powers, in addition to a fine of €30,000 for disobeying the Central Electoral Board (JEC) by not withdrawing partisan symbols in the Palau de la Generalitat and not guaranteeing the institution's neutrality during the April election campaign. Torra then vowed to appeal the sentence (not firm) to a higher instance, the Supreme Court (TS).

On 3 January 2020 the JEC determined the execution of the TSJC sentence in regards of Torra's electability as member of the Parliament of Catalonia, ruling Torra's disqualification from his parliamentary seat. The JEC left open to interpretation if losing the seat would also entail the disqualification from the post of president of the regional government. Torra appealed again to the TS to clarify the JEC ruling, on whether the electoral authority actually had the authority to strip him of the parliamentary seat. The second appeal before the TS by Torra was turned down.

Enforcing the ruling of the JEC, the Secretary of the Parliament of Catalonia stripped Torra of his status as legislator on 27 January 2020. Torra compelled then the House's Speaker, ERC's Roger Torrent (who had announced he would not take the vote of Torra into consideration) to contempt unless he wanted to "put the institutions at risk", to no success. The Parliament of Catalonia had interpreted the Statute of Catalonia in the sense that the President of the Generalitat could remain in the post, as the status of legislator would be necessary only at the moment of the investiture, so, for the time being and pending the resolution of his appeal before the TS, Torra remains as president of the Catalan Government. Symptoms of collapse of the JuntsxCat–ERC coalition government ensued after Torra's "unseating", with the absence in the votings of the full JuntsxCat bloc vis-à-vis the passing of the Parliament's budget and a defiant Torra, who refrained then from calling a new election, nonetheless. A day after Torra argued that "the (legislative) term had no political future if unity cannot be maintained" and announced his intention to call a new election, but not until the regional budget was passed.

== Personal life ==
Torra was married to teacher Carola Miró, who died on 4 May 2024 at the age of 58 from cancer. They have three children, two girls and a boy.

On 16 March 2020, he announced in a public appearance he was positive for COVID-19 during COVID-19 pandemic in Spain.

== Published works ==
- Ganivetades Suïsses (2007, Símbol Editors; ISBN 8495987546, 9788495987549)
- Periodisme? Permetin! La vida i els Articles d'Eugeni Xammar (2008, Símbol Editors; ISBN 8495987635, 9788495987631), biography of Eugeni Xammar
- El Bibliobús de la Llibertat (Miquel Joseph i Mayol, 2008, Símbol Editors; ISBN 8495987619, 9788495987617) (ed. with Jaume Ciurana)
- Viatge Involuntari a la Catalunya Impossible (2010, Proa Edicions; ISBN 8482569171, 9788482569178)
- Honorables. Cartes a la Pàtria Perduda (2011, A Contravent; ISBN 8493889717, 9788493889715)
- Un Bohemi al Cabaret del Món. Vida de Manuel Fontdevila, un Senyor de Granollers (2013, A Contravent; ISBN 9788415720119)
- Els Últims 100 Metres : el Full de Ruta per Guanyar la República Catalana (2016, Angle Editorial; ISBN 8416139997, 9788416139996)
- Muriel Casals i la Revolució dels Somriures (2016, Editorial Pòrtic; ISBN 8498093775, 9788498093773)

== Electoral history ==
Electoral history of Quim Torra
Election	Constituency	Party	Alliance	Result
2017 regional	Province of Barcelona	Independent	Together for Catalonia	Elected
