= St. Ignatius College, Barcelona =

- Catalan: Jesuïtes Sarrià-Sant Ignasi

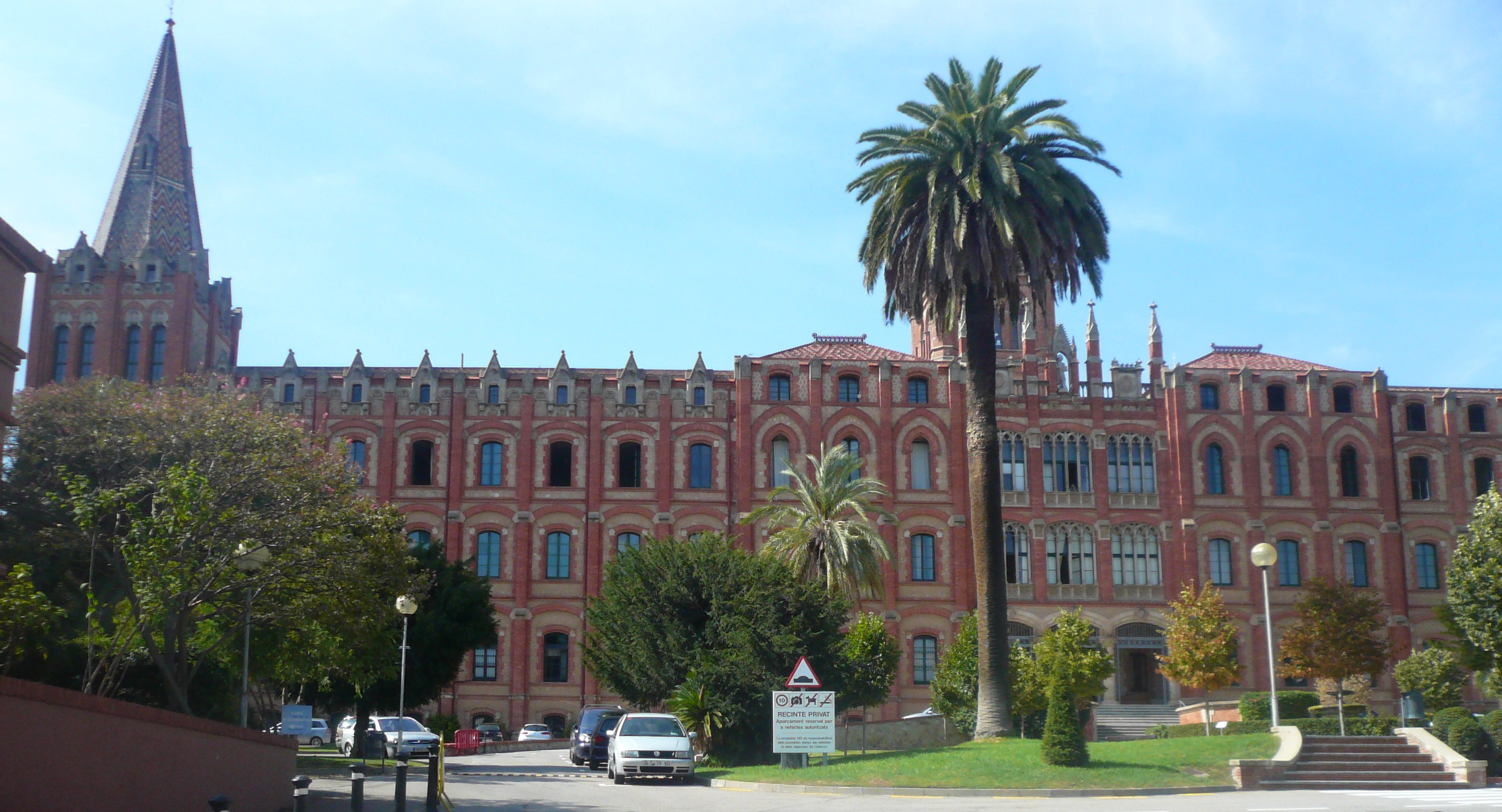

Location
- Carrasco i Formiguera 32; Barcelona, Catalonia; Spain
- Coordinates: 41°24′12″N 2°07′16″E

Information
- Type: Private primary and secondary and vocational training centre
- Religious affiliation: Catholicism
- Denomination: Jesuit
- Patron saint: Ignatius Loyola
- Established: 1892; 134 years ago
- Grades: K-12; including Spanish Baccalaureate with vocational training
- Gender: Co-educational
- Enrollment: 3,000
- Website: www.santignasi.fje.edu
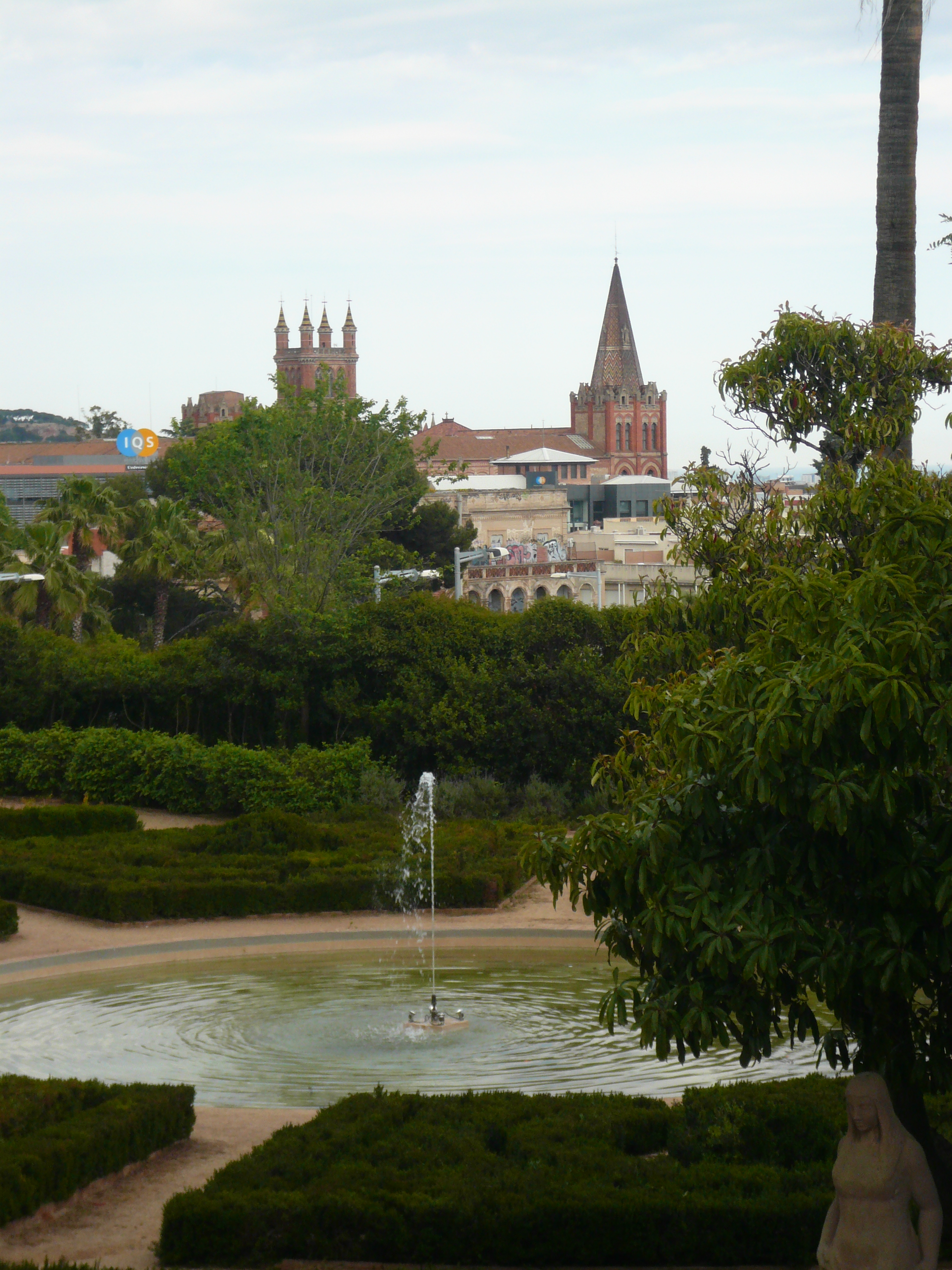
- A view of the College, in 2013

St. Ignatius College (Catalan: Jesuïtes Sarrià-Sant Ignasi) is a private Catholic primary and secondary school and vocational training facility, located in the Sarrià neighbourhood of Barcelona, in Catalonia, an autonomous community in the northeastern corner of Spain. The school was founded in 1892 by the Society of Jesus.

St. Ignatius College currently offers kindergarten, primary, secondary high school, and vocational training; the compulsory part is government subsidized.

== History ==
The centre began as a boarding school in a rented municipal building in Manresa, which was evacuated after a misunderstanding between the Council and the Jesuits.

In 1892 the Jesuits bought the Gardeny property, consisting of a house and extensive gardens. An annex was built and classes began the same year. The current building was built between 1893 and 1896, and opened in 1895 unfinished (completed between 1915 and 1926). It was originally a boarding school but began admitting external students in 1905. In 1907 it had 20 teachers and 230 students, mostly boarders.

The school was closed in 1914 so that the facility could accommodate the Jesuit houses of philosophical and theological studies for the priesthood, but it reopened in 1927.

During the Second Republic as a result of the decree of expulsion of the Jesuits, the Government made it a public school until the end of the Civil War.

After 1939 the school was returned to the Jesuits and began to operate normally. Its enrollment was high in 1949, with a steady growth in students. The school currently has about 3,000 students.

== Notable alumni ==
- Alberto Fernández Díaz
- Andrés Iniesta
- Rafael Ribó
- Xavier Trias
- Carlos Ruiz Zafón

== Controversies ==
=== Documentary ===
La Fugida

== See also ==
- Catholic Church in Spain
- Education in Catalan
- List of Jesuit schools
