= Wake Up Europe! =

Catalan demonstration in Brussels

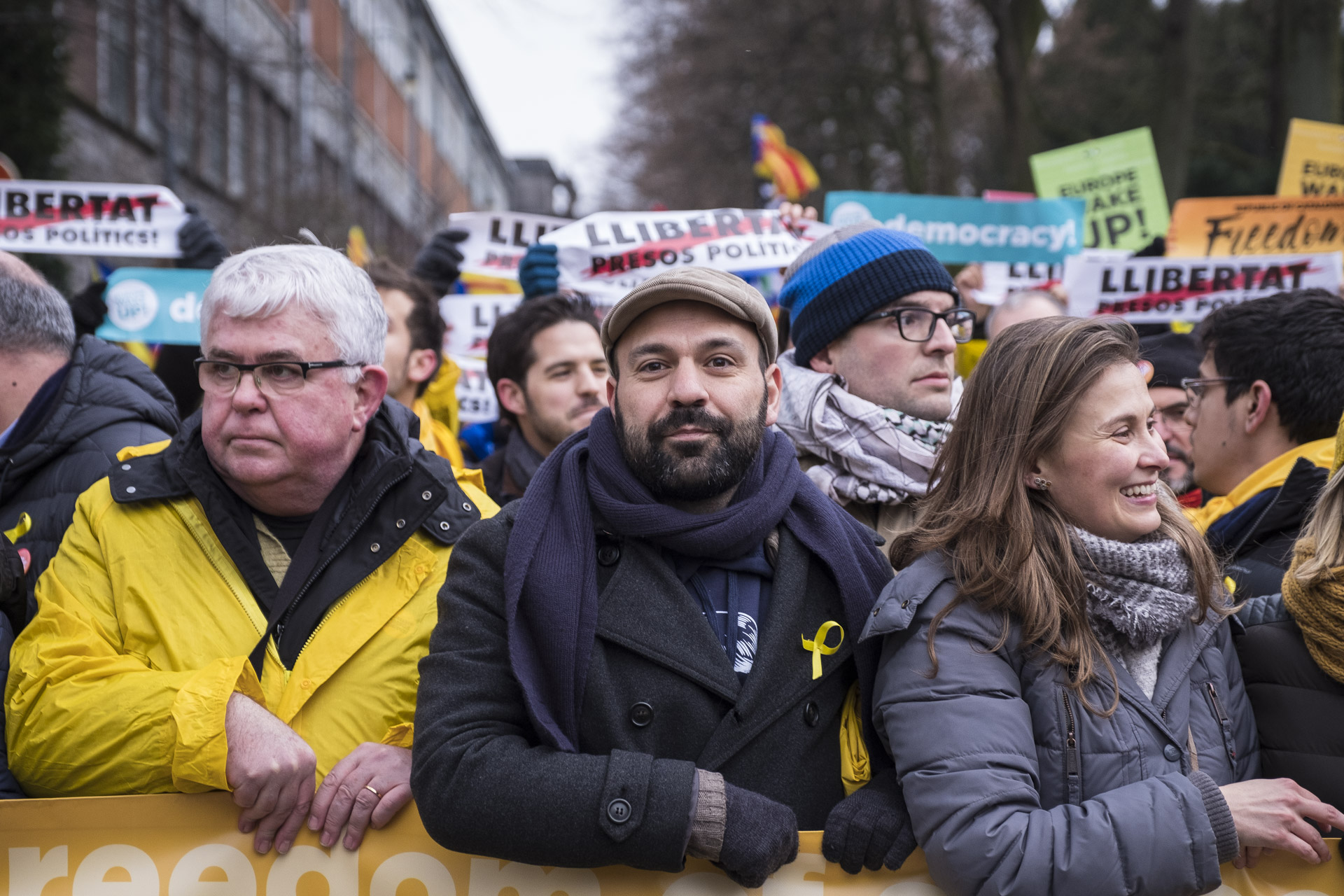
- Agustí Alcoberro (ANC, left) and Marcel Mauri (center, Òmnium Cultural) at the head of the demonstration
- Date: 7 December 2017
- Location: Brussels (Belgium)
- Goals: Independence of Catalonia; Creation of a Catalan Republic
- Methods: Political rally, street protest
- Result: 45,000 people demonstration

Wake Up Europe! (Catalan: Europa, desperta't!) is a gathering in Brussels on 7 December 2017 in support of Catalan independence. It was organized by the Catalan National Assembly (ANC), the main civil society organisations behind the massive pro-independence demonstrations held since 2012, and Òmnium Cultural.

The number of participants that took part in the demonstration was 45,000 according to the Police Bruxelles Capitale Ixelles.

The demonstration followed similar protests in 2012, the Catalan Way (2013), the Catalan Way 2014, the Free Way to the Catalan Republic (2015), Go ahead, Catalan Republic (2016) and National Day for Yes (2017).

Representatives from a pro-independence pressure group handed over a petition with 25,000 signatures to the European Parliament. The manifesto delivered by members of the Committees for the Defense of the Republic calls on the European Union to act to achieve «the release of the political prisoners».

== Development ==
The event included the participation of Catalan President Carles Puigdemont and members of Together for Catalonia, Republican Left of Catalonia–Catalonia Yes and Popular Unity Candidacy.

== See also ==
- Catalan independence
