= Fem la República Catalana =

Let's build the Catalan Republic!
- Date: 11 September 2018
- Location: Barcelona
- Goals: Independence of Catalonia; Creation of a Catalan Republic
- Methods: Political rally, street protest

Let's build the Catalan Republic! (Catalan: Fem la República Catalana) was a gathering in Barcelona on 11 September 2018, the National Day of Catalonia, in support of Catalan independence and the Catalan Republic passed by the Parliament of Catalonia on 27 October 2017. It was organized by the Catalan National Assembly (ANC), the main civil society organisations behind the massive pro-independence demonstrations held since 2012.

The number of participants that took part in the demonstration was 1,000,000 according to the Guàrdia Urbana de Barcelona. Organisers said 460,000 people had registered beforehand for the event, using an online form.

== Background ==
After winning a majority in the 2015 Parliament of Catalonia election, pro-referendum parties approved a project to hold the Catalan independence referendum on 1 October 2017. The outcome of the referendum gave the victory the independence option and the Parliament of Catalonia passed the Catalan declaration of independence on 27 October 2017. The objective of the demonstration was to boost and show support for Catalan Republic.

The demonstration followed similar protests in 2010, 2012, the Catalan Way (2013), the Catalan Way 2014, the Free Way to the Catalan Republic (2015), the Go ahead, Catalan Republic (2016) and the National Day for Yes (2017).

== See also ==
- Catalan independence
- National Day of Catalonia
- List of protests in the 21st century
