= National Day for Yes =

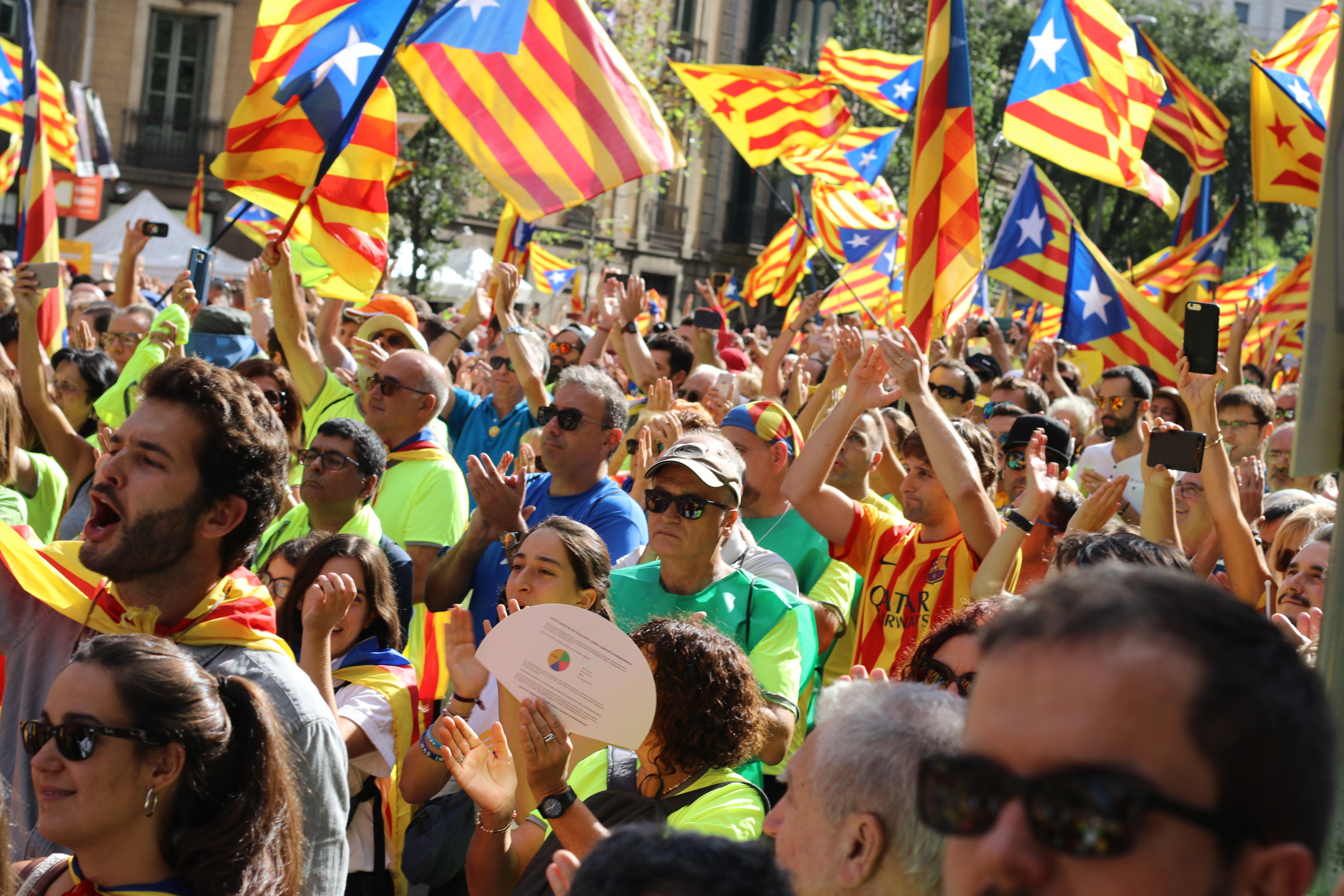
- People peacefully demonstrating in the streets of Barcelona hoisting Estelades, Catalan secessionist flags.
- Date: 11 September 2017
- Location: Barcelona
- Goals: Independence of Catalonia; Creation of a Catalan Republic
- Methods: Political rally, street protest
- Result: 350,000–1,000,000 people demonstration

National Day for Yes (Catalan: La Diada del Sí) was a gathering in Barcelona on 11 September 2017, the National Day of Catalonia, in support of Catalan independence. It was organized by the Catalan National Assembly (ANC), the main civil society organisations behind the massive pro-independence demonstrations held since 2012.

The number of participants that took part in the demonstration varied between 350,000 as reported by the Spanish Government delegation and 1,000,000 according to the Guàrdia Urbana de Barcelona, with other calculus also suggesting an in-between participation of around 500,000. Organisers said 450,000 people had registered beforehand for the event, using an online form.

After winning a majority in the 2015 Parliament of Catalonia election, pro-referendum parties approved a project to hold the Catalan independence referendum on 1 October 2017. The objective of the demonstration was to boost and show support for independence option.

The demonstration followed similar protests in 2010, 2012, the Catalan Way (2013), the Catalan Way 2014, the Free Way to the Catalan Republic (2015) and the Go ahead, Catalan Republic (2016).

== Background ==
The Principality of Catalonia was annexed during the War of Spanish Succession, after the bloody Siege of Barcelona that ended on 11 September 1714. By the middle of the 19th century, a growing educated middle class started to recover its language, identity and cultural traditions and this led to a Catalan independence movement at the beginning of the 20th century.

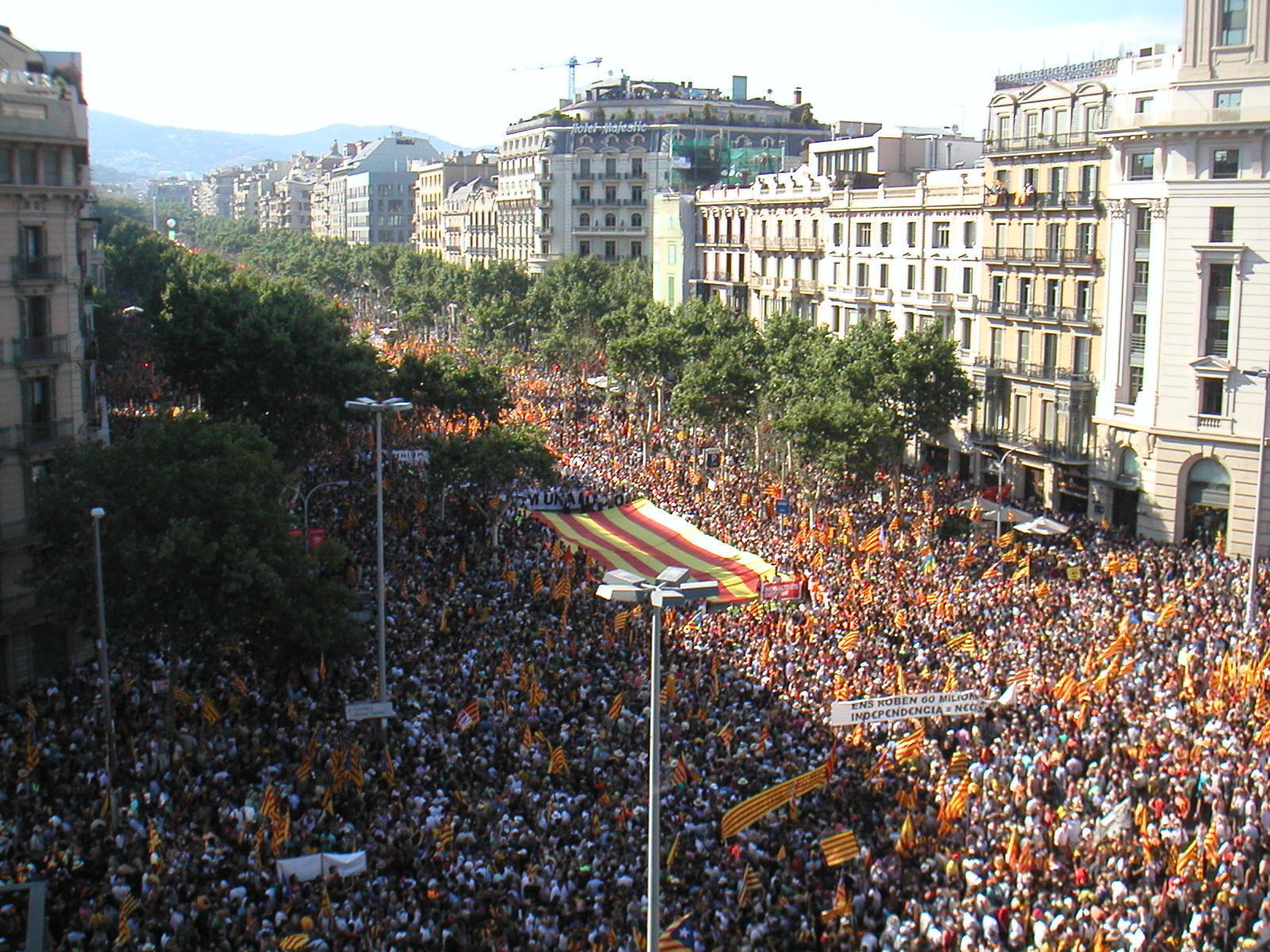
The massive demonstration with the slogan "We are a nation. We decide." in 2010 would spark the later massive independentist demonstrations.

During the Second Spanish Republic there were different failed attempts of secession quickly followed by the start of the Spanish Civil War. After the francoist victory, which established a fascist-style government, Catalans were severely repressed, including the execution of the elected President of Catalonia Lluís Companys.

After the 1978 Spanish transition to democracy, Catalonia regained some autonomy. After 25 years of political stability some requests of more autonomy started to appear, resulting in a Catalan Statute of Autonomy in 2005 which became law in 2006. Spanish institutions asked to ban the new law, declaring it unconstitutional in 2010. This situation, in addition to the 2008 crisis, fuelled the first major autonomy demonstration in Barcelona on 10 July 2010, when a million people marched under the banner "We are a nation. We decide."

Since then Catalan National Days, Diades in Catalan, have brought more than 1 million people out onto the streets every 11 September. There was also a non-binding and unofficial consultation on 9 November 2014, when 1.8 million Catalans voted in favour of independence.

The demonstration takes place just a few weeks before the 2017 Catalan independence referendum which is going to take place on 1 October 2017. The referendum was approved by the Generalitat de Catalunya with the Law on a Self-determination Referendum on the Independence of Catalonia but Spain's constitutional court has suspended the Catalan referendum law and Spanish Guardia Civil officers are trying to prevent the referendum by seizing the ballot boxes and ballot papers.

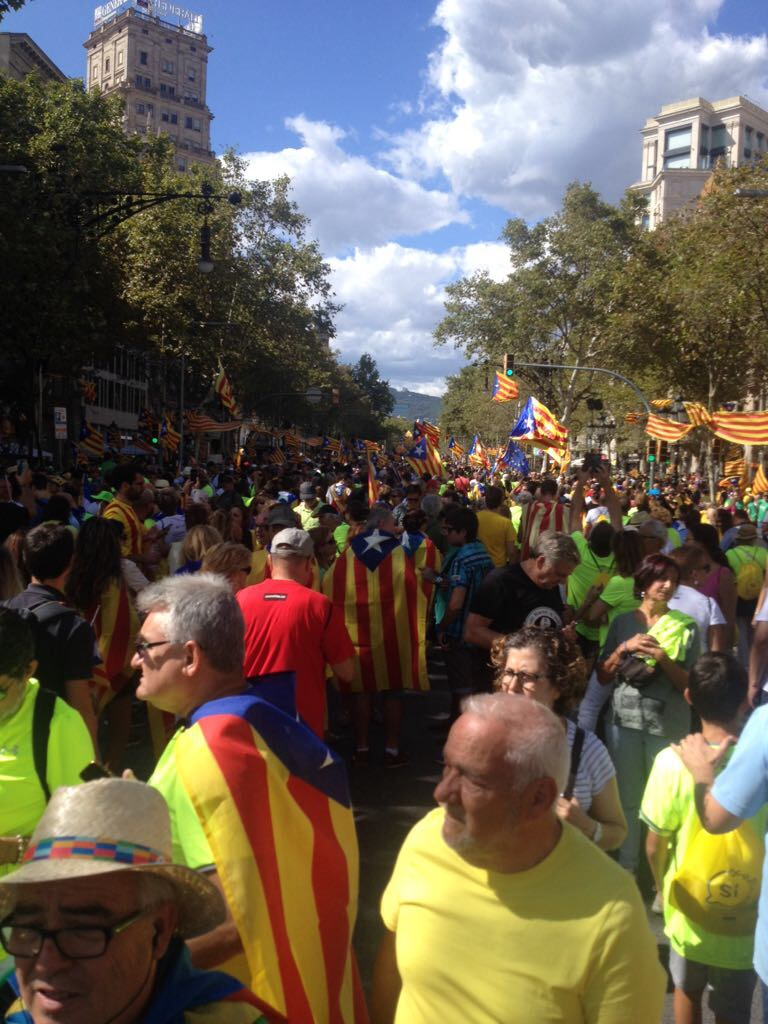
People demonstrating in Barcelona.

Even though it has been banned by Spain, Catalonia's government has already started the referendum for the Catalan community living abroad and they plan to hold the referendum on 1 October anyway, promising to secede from Spain if the vote is Yes.

== Development ==
The demonstration was planned to be seen as a + sign from the air, suggesting the benefits of the independence of Catalonia. This massive positive sign was divided in four zones representing the geography of the country:

- The mountain, coloured green, corresponding to the upper part of the sign comprised Passeig de Gràcia north from Carrer d'Aragó.
- The sea, coloured blue, corresponding to the lower part of the positive sign comprised the southern part of Carrer Aragó and Plaça Catalunya, Barcelona.
- The Llobregat river, coloured yellow, corresponding to the left part of the sign comprised Passeig de Gràcia until Carrer de Muntaner.
- The Besòs river, coloured orange, corresponding to the right side of sign comprised Passeig de Gràcia until Passeig de Sant Joan.

The banner passing over the crowd during the main event.

To ease the organisation the demonstration was divided in 49 sections, each section had people from different comarques assigned. This distributed evenly the people coming from different parts of Catalonia. To ferry all the people to the capital of Catalonia 1,800 buses were rented by the Catalan National Assembly. Transports Metropolitans de Barcelona and Ferrocarrils de la Generalitat de Catalunya increased the number of trains for the occasion, while closing some of the closest stations to avoid agglomerations of people.

Even though people started gathering before, the main event took place at the hour 17.14, commemorating the ones who sacrificed themselves during the final defence of Barcelona in 1714. During the main event, from the four ends of the positive sign a human wave carrying a 16x16 m banner would start. People under the banner would then change their tops for the official yellow-fluorescent T-shirt (which cost €15 and was used to fund the whole demonstration). The banners included messages in favour of democracy and peace. Following this performance, the saxophonist Pep Poblet played Pau Casals i Defilló's song El cant dels ocells in honour of the deceased during the 2017 Catalonia attacks.

== See also ==
- Catalan independence
- National Day of Catalonia
