= Yes Campaign =

2017 Catalan independence campaign

- Formation: 3 August 2017
- Type: Civil society and political campaign
- Purpose: 2017 Catalan independence referendum
- Headquarters: Barcelona
- Key people: Jordi Sànchez, president of promoting organization Natàlia Esteve, vice president of promoting organization
- Website: webdelsi.cat

Yes Campaign (Catalan: Campanya del Sí) is a Catalan campaign made up of different organisations and individuals campaigning in favor of a Yes vote in the 2017 Catalan independence referendum. It was launched on 3 August 2017.

The campaign is promoted by the Catalan National Assembly and includes Òmnium Cultural, the Association of Municipalities for Independence, the Catalan European Democratic Party, the Republican Left of Catalonia, the Popular Unity Candidacy, Democrats of Catalonia, Left Movement and Catalan Solidarity for Independence.

== See also ==
- Catalan independence movement
