= Marcel Mauri =

Catalan journalist & historian

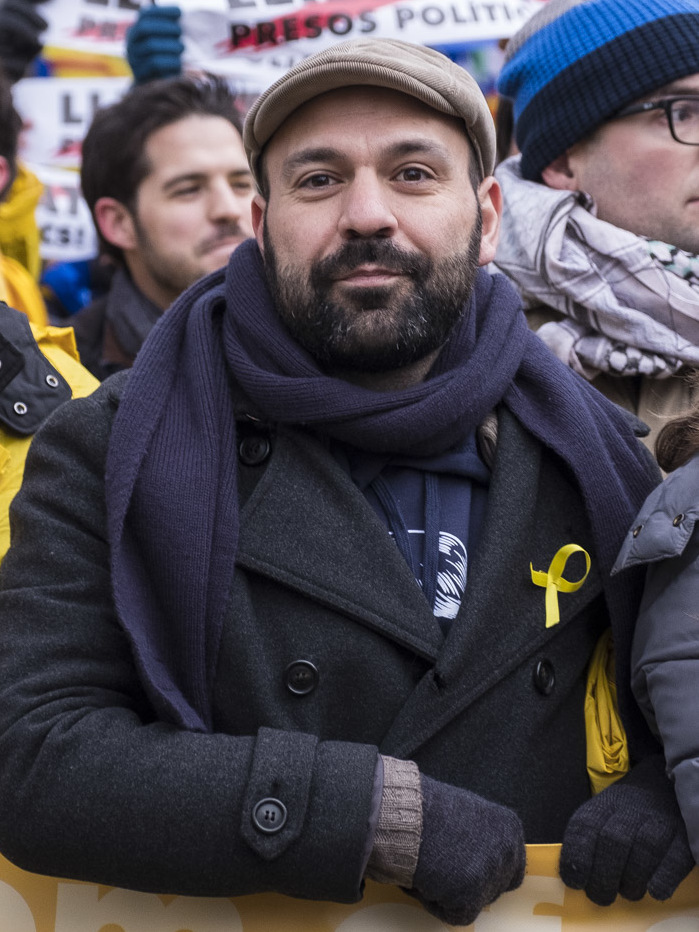
- Marcel Mauri at Wake Up Europe!, Brussels, 2007
- Born: Marcel Mauri de los Rios; 1985; Badalona, Catalonia, Spain
- Occupation(s): Journalist and historian
- Known for: Spokesman of Òmnium Cultural

Marcel Mauri de los Rios (born 1977 in Badalona, Spain) is a journalist and historian, former vice president and spokesman of Òmnium Cultural.

== Biography ==
Mauri was born in 1977 in Badalona. As a teenager, he studied in the Escola Jungfrau and in the Institut La Llauna in Badalona.

He has been involved in activism since then. First, as a member of the esplai, then, already in the university, as a member of the Bloc d’Estudiants Independentistes (BEI) and the Coordinadora d’Estudiants dels Països Catalans (CEPC).

=== Academic and professional career ===
He is Professor of Journalism and Journalistic Ethics of the Communications Department at Pompeu Fabra University. He is also an ethics and communications law consultant at the Open University of Catalonia. In 2007, he conducted his predoctoral research at Sorbonne University in Paris, in 2010 he did postdoctoral research at Columbia University, in New York. He has published books and articles on ethics in media and history of journalism. In 2012 he was awarded the Joan Givanel i Mas Social Communication Award by the Institut d'Estudis Catalans.

On January 8, 2016, he was chosen chef de cabinet of Mayoralty and Communication of the Badalona Town Hall. In 2017 he was designated advisor of the Vice President and Minister of Economy and Finance of the Catalan Government.

=== Òmnium Cultural ===
Since 2007 he was part of the territorial board of Òmnium Badalona - Barcelonès Nord and became the territorial board president for almost 4 years (2010–2014). He resigned as member of the board in 2014 to become a member of Muriel Casals' candidacy for the Board of Directors of Òmnium Cultural, on a voluntary and unpaid basis. He was a member of the board until on October 16, 2017, when Jordi Cuixart was imprisoned in Soto del Real. From that moment until 2022, he became the entity's vice-president and spokesperson, a position that was also voluntary and unpaid.
