= Jordi Cuixart =

Catalan businessman and activist (born 1975)

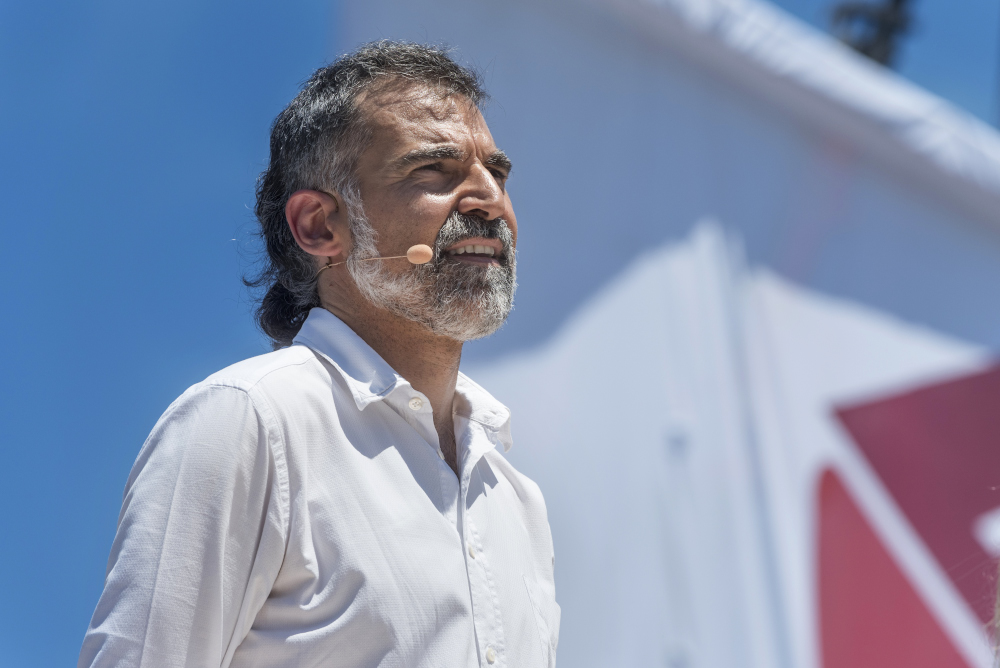
- Born: Jordi Cuixart i Navarro; 22 April 1975 (age 51); Santa Perpètua de Mogoda, Catalonia, Spain
- Occupations: Businessperson, activist
- Known for: President of Òmnium Cultural (December 2015 – February 2022)

Signature
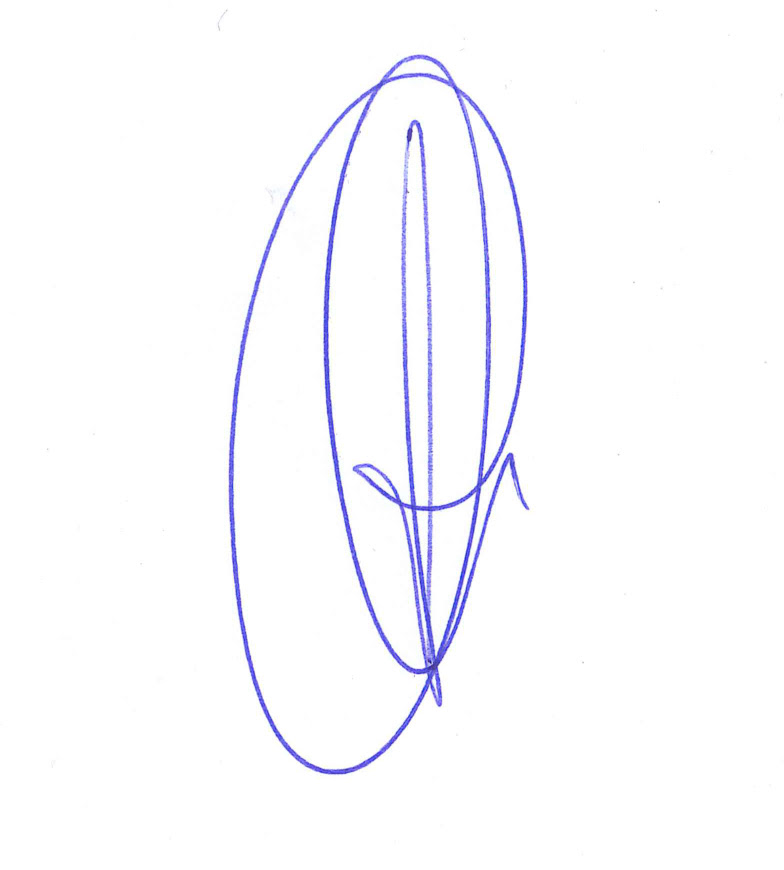

Jordi Cuixart i Navarro (born 22 April 1975) is a Catalan businessman and cultural activist. He was the president of Òmnium Cultural, a non-profit cultural organisation founded in 1961 with more than 190,000 members and 52 local branches in Catalonia, from December 2015 to February 2022.

As part of his role in the pro-independence demonstrations prior to the Catalan independence referendum of 2017, he was imprisoned from October 2017 until June 2021 under charge of sedition brought by the Spanish prosecutor's office. In October 2019, after two years of pre-trial detention, Cuixart was sentenced to nine years of prison for sedition. Amnesty International believes his detention and sentence constituted a disproportionate restriction on his rights to free speech and peaceful assembly, and urged Spain to free him. The NGO Front Line Defenders and the Council of Europe consider Jordi Cuixart a human rights defender. He repeatedly said that "as a political prisoner my priority is not getting out of prison, but the solution of the political situation and struggle for democracy and human rights". He was freed in June 2021 following a government pardon.

== Biography ==
Cuixart was born in 1975 in Santa Perpètua de Mogoda. His mother hailed from Murcia and his father from Badalona. He lived in Santa Perpètua de Mogoda for 30 years before moving to Sabadell, where he remained until his imprisonment in 2017.

As a teenager, he studied mechanics in the vocational education centre Institut Escola Industrial i d'Arts i Oficis in Sabadell. He joined Òmnium Cultural in 1996. In addition, he is a member of different social organisations, such as Can Capablanca, a pro-Catalan independence social centre in Sabadell, the cooperative financial institution Coop 57, and Amnesty International. He was an objector to Spanish military service.

As a businessman, Cuixart is the founder and president of Aranow, a company that exports packaging machinery. He is co-founder and chairman of FemCAT, a private foundation of Catalan businesspeople.

== Activism in Òmnium Cultural ==
He became the treasurer and later vice-president of Òmnium Cultural as an associate to Muriel Casals, who first became Òmnium's president in 2010 and was re-elected to the post in 2014. Under Casals' leadership, Òmnium Cultural's original focus in Catalan culture broadened to include the promotion of self-determination and Catalan independence. Jordi Cuixart succeeded Muriel Casals as president of Òmnium in December 2015, after she stepped down in July of that year to stand in the forthcoming Catalan election (in the meantime, the organisation was headed by Quim Torra as interim president).

As president of Òmnium Cultural, he focused on widening the sovereignist social majority, while maintaining a program where the Catalan language and culture vertebrate social cohesion. He promoted, among others, the Lluites compartides (Shared fights) campaign, with which he wanted to promote the shared historical memory of social mobilization processes that, in different areas and moments of time, have been decisive in shaping what is today Catalonia. Cuixart also continued the organisation's involvement in the political developments leading to the Catalan independence referendum of 2017. During this period, Spanish police searched Òmnium's main headquarters twice, and shut down websites promoting mobilization.

== Imprisonment ==
On 16 October 2017, Jordi Cuixart and Jordi Sànchez were preventively jailed after the state attorney's accusation of sedition, a felony regulated by the article 544 and subsequents of the Spanish Criminal Code.

This sedition was allegedly committed when they organized a protest on 20 September 2017 during Operation Anubis police raids to dismantle the framework of the 1 October Catalan independence referendum performed by the Spanish Civil Guard. They were accused of leading the protest of tens of thousands of people in front of the Catalan economy department heeding a call made by Òmnium Cultural and ANC. The investigating judge stated that the leaders did not call for "peaceful demonstration but to the protection of Catalan officials through 'massive citizens' mobilisations", which physically blocked the Guardia Civil from leaving the building for the entire day. The court clerk remained trapped until midnight inside the building and had to flee by the roof terrace, while several agents were trapped throughout the night as demonstrators shouted outside "You won't get out!" and "They shall not pass". Cuixart and Sànchez argue that they made several public calls asking for "peaceful" and "civic" protests in social networks, in a public statement in front of the media at noon and in a speech in front of the demonstrators in the evening. According to the judge, Sànchez encouraged the demonstrators with expressions such as "no one goes home, it will be a long and intense night", on top of a vandalized police vehicle. But footage from that night also show Cuixart and Sànchez calling off the protests on top of the car at 11pm: "We are asking you, to the extent possible and in a peaceful way, to dissolve today's gathering". After those calls, most demonstrators left the place and only a few hundred remained. Those were dispersed by crowd-controls units of the autonomous police force of Catalonia, Mossos d'Esquadra. Mossos recognized that there was a risk situation and denounced Spanish Civil Guard did not notify them in advance of the searches, making it impossible to prepare a police operation to keep demonstrators far from the building.

In July 2018, Cuixart was transferred to a prison in Catalonia. On 1 February 2019 he was transferred back to a prison in Madrid, expecting trial that started on 12 February and was remitted to decision on 12 June 2019.

In February 2019 he published the book Tres dies a la presó: un diàleg sense murs (literally, "Three days at jail: a dialogue without walls"), a talk with the journalist Gemma Nierga. In July 2019 he published his second book "Ho tornarem a fer" (We'll do it again), a manifesto to defend the struggle for the fundamental rights, and in November 2021 his last book appeared, “Aprenentatges i una proposta” (literally, “Learnings/Lessons and a proposal”). He has also written two books for children, “Un bosc ple d’amor” and “El polsim màgic”, the latter dedicate to “the children of all political prisoners around the world”.

On 14 October 2019 Cuixart was found guilty of sedition and given a nine-year sentence.

=== Reactions ===
==== In Catalonia and Spain ====
Exiled Catalan former President Carles Puigdemont and the European Free Alliance referred to Sànchez and Cuixart as "political prisoners". The Spanish Justice Minister Rafael Catalá argued that they were not "political prisoners" but "imprisoned politicians".

Since then, there have been several demonstrations and concentrations asking for their release. On 19 October, 200,000 people with candles gathered in Avinguda Diagonal, Barcelona and on 21 October, 450,000 joined in Passeig de Gràcia to protest against their imprisonment. Another demonstration took place on 11 November, after the imprisonment of some members of the Catalan government, and 750,000 people congregated according to Barcelona city police.

After his detention, activists launched a “yellow-ribbon” campaign in support of Jordi Cuixart and other Catalan activists and leaders who are being prosecuted by Spanish justice.

==== International ====
Amnesty International issued an official statement considering the charge of sedition and the preventive imprisonment "excessive" and called for their immediate release.

Amnesty International calls on Spanish authorities to drop the charges of sedition and to put an immediate end to their pre-trial detention.

— Amnesty International

On 7 March 2018 the Office of the United Nations High Commissioner for Human Rights reminded Spanish authorities that "pre-trial detention should be considered a measure of last resort" referring to Catalan politicians and activists arrested after the independence referendum. On 8 August 2018, PEN International made another statement asking Spanish authorities to release Cuixart and Sànchez and considered their detentions to be "an excessive and disproportionate restriction on their right to freedom of expression and peaceful assembly". Also, public figures such as Jody Williams, Noam Chomsky, Pep Guardiola, Angela Davis and Ben Emmerson demanded his freedom.

The World Organisation Against Torture sent an open letter to the President of the Government of Spain Pedro Sánchez as well as the Spanish Attorney General and Spanish Ombudsman on 22 November 2018 demanding the end of the "arbitrary pre-trial detention and judicial harassment of Jordi Cuixart and Jordi Sànchez" and concluded "OMCT considers that the charges against them are unfounded and must therefore be dropped". The day after, the NGO Front Line Defenders also issued a statement calling for the release of Cuixart. In December 2018, the International Association of Democratic Lawyers issued a statement requesting the release of Catalan political prisoners.

The day before the beginning of the trial, the Unrepresented Nations and Peoples Organization expressed their support to "those Catalan activists being trialled" and added "perhaps one of the biggest deficit of justice and deliberate confusion between law and justice, is seen in Catalonia". On the same day, the European Democratic Lawyers association requested the immediate release of the Catalan leaders and expressed their concern because of the "lack of procedural guarantees during the trial".

On 29 May 2019, the United Nations Working Group on Arbitrary Detention urged Spain to release Cuixart, Sànchez and Junqueras and to investigate their "arbitrary" detention and the violation of theirs rights, as well as compensating them for the time spent in jail. The Spanish government criticised the report, arguing that the reasoning for their opinion did not take into account some of the alleged crimes. Spain's government issued a statement that raised doubts about the group's "independence and impartiality" and called on the U.N. to make sure that its semi-independent working groups are not used "for spurious purposes".

After Cuixart was sentenced to a nine-year sentence, Amnesty International reiterated its petition to immediately release Cuixart and Sànchez and denounced that the "vague" and "overly broad" interpretation of sedition done by the Spanish Supreme Court could have negative effects on the freedom of protest in Spain. Amnesty International has since demanded the freedom of Cuixart and Sànchez on two other occasions.

The OMCT also condemned the "disproportionate conviction of Catalan leaders", as did world politicians such as Nicola Sturgeon, Yanis Varoufakis, the EFA and the EELV. Other international organizations also criticized the harsh sentence, such as Front Line Defenders, Liberties, ELDH - European Lawyers for Democracy and Human Rights, and AED (Avocats Européens Démocrates).

The UN and the Council of Europe both included him in their 2019 yearly report on the situation of Human Rights Defenders in member states.

In October 2019, thousands of people protested his conviction, and those of eight other Catalan leaders. During the protests, that lasted almost two weeks, 639 people were injured and 214 arrested.

In January 2021, 50 human rights defenders such as Yoko Ono, Irvin Welsh or Dilma Rousseff, and Nobel Prize winners such as Shirin Ebadi, Adolfo Pérez Esquivel, Jody Williams, Mairead Corrigan or Elfriede Jelinek, joined the Dialogue for Catalonia manifesto, calling for a dialogue between Catalonia and Spain to end the repression and advance towards a political solution.

On 8 June 2021, Spain's Constitutional Court rejected Jordi Cuixart's appeal against his sentence. On 9 June, the day after, Jordi Cuixart's lawyer presented his appeal to the European Courts of Human Rights (ECHR), in Strasbourg, denouncing the "abusive limitation" of fundamental human rights that he suffered. On 20 December 2021, the ECHR informed Cuixart that it had already received the appeal.

In June 2021, Cuixart was freed together with other eight politicians imprisoned in connection with the Catalan independence referendum following a government pardon. Before that, in May 2021, the Supreme Court had asked him for a position on the pardon to prepare the report on the pardons for the Spanish government. He replied that he had not asked for any measure of pardon because everything he had done, he "would do it again", and he demanded an amnesty.
