= Free Way to the Catalan Republic =

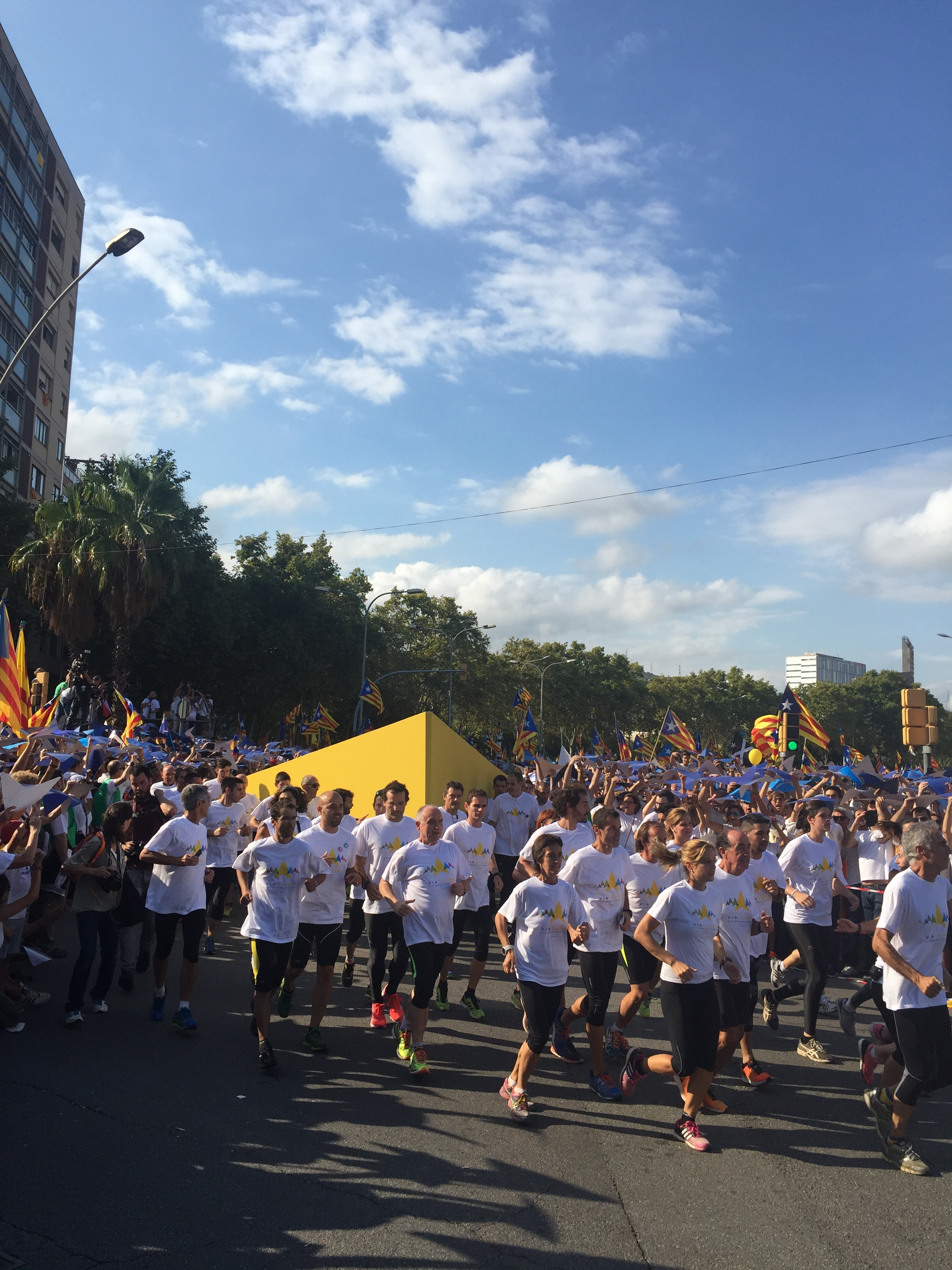
- Large arrow marching through the crowd during the demonstration
- Date: 11 September 2015
- Location: Catalonia
- Goals: Independence of Catalonia
- Methods: Political rally, street protest

The Free Way to the Catalan Republic (Catalan: Via Lliure a la República Catalana), or Free Way, was a large gathering in Barcelona on 11 September 2015, the National Day of Catalonia, in support of Catalan independence. It was organized by "Now is the Time", a joint campaign organized and funded by the Assemblea Nacional Catalana (ANC) and Òmnium Cultural. The number of participants was estimated at 1.8 million according to Barcelona's Municipal Police.

The demonstration followed similar protests in 2010, 2012, the Catalan Way (2013) and the Catalan Way 2014. It was followed by Go ahead, Catalan Republic (2016).

== See also ==
- Catalan independence
- National Day of Catalonia
