= Go ahead, Catalan Republic =

We are ready Ahead Catalan Republic
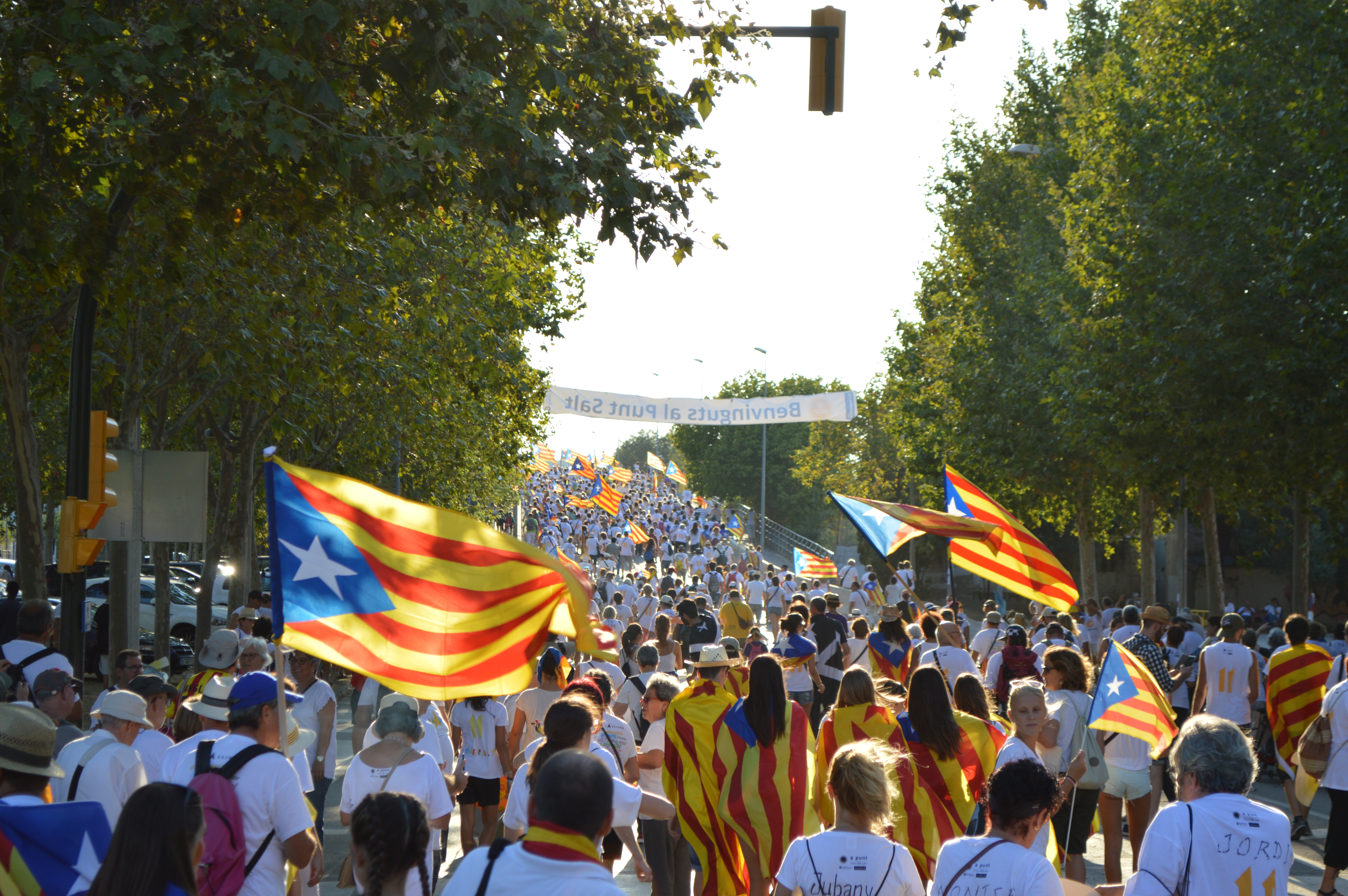
- Crowded street in Salt, Girona, during the protest demonstration "A punt".
- Date: 11 September 2016
- Location: Catalonia
- Goals: Independence of Catalonia
- Methods: Political rally, street protest

Go ahead, Catalan Republic or We are ready (Catalan: A punt or Endavant república catalana) was a coordinated demonstration that consisted of five large celebrations in Barcelona, Berga, Lleida, Salt and Tarragona on 11 September 2016, the National Day of Catalonia, in support of Catalan independence. It was organized by the Catalan National Assembly (ANC) and Omnium Cultural, the main civil society organisations behind the massive pro-independence demonstrations held since 2012.

The number of participants that took part in the demonstrations, according to the organizers, was 1,030,000 people, The municipal police estimated that 800,000 people participated while Spain's central government put turnout at around 370,000 strong.

After winning a clear majority in the Parliament of Catalonia for the first time ever in 2015, secessionist parties approved a project to achieve independence in mid-2017. The objective of the demonstration was to boost and show support for this plan.

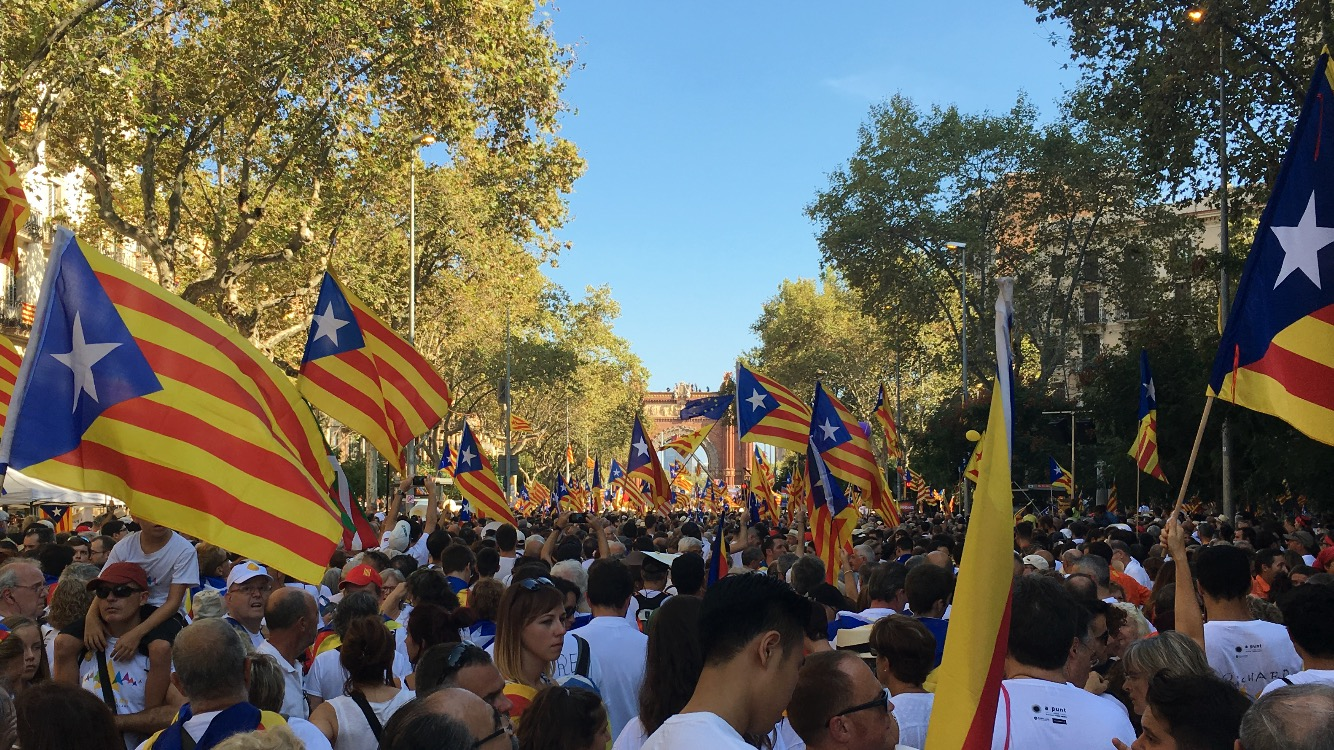
Passeig de Sant Joan, Barcelona, during the demonstration.

The demonstration followed similar protests in 2010, 2012, the Catalan Way (2013), the Catalan Way 2014 and the Free Way to the Catalan Republic (2015).
