= 2012 Catalan independence demonstration =

Protest in Catalonia, Spain

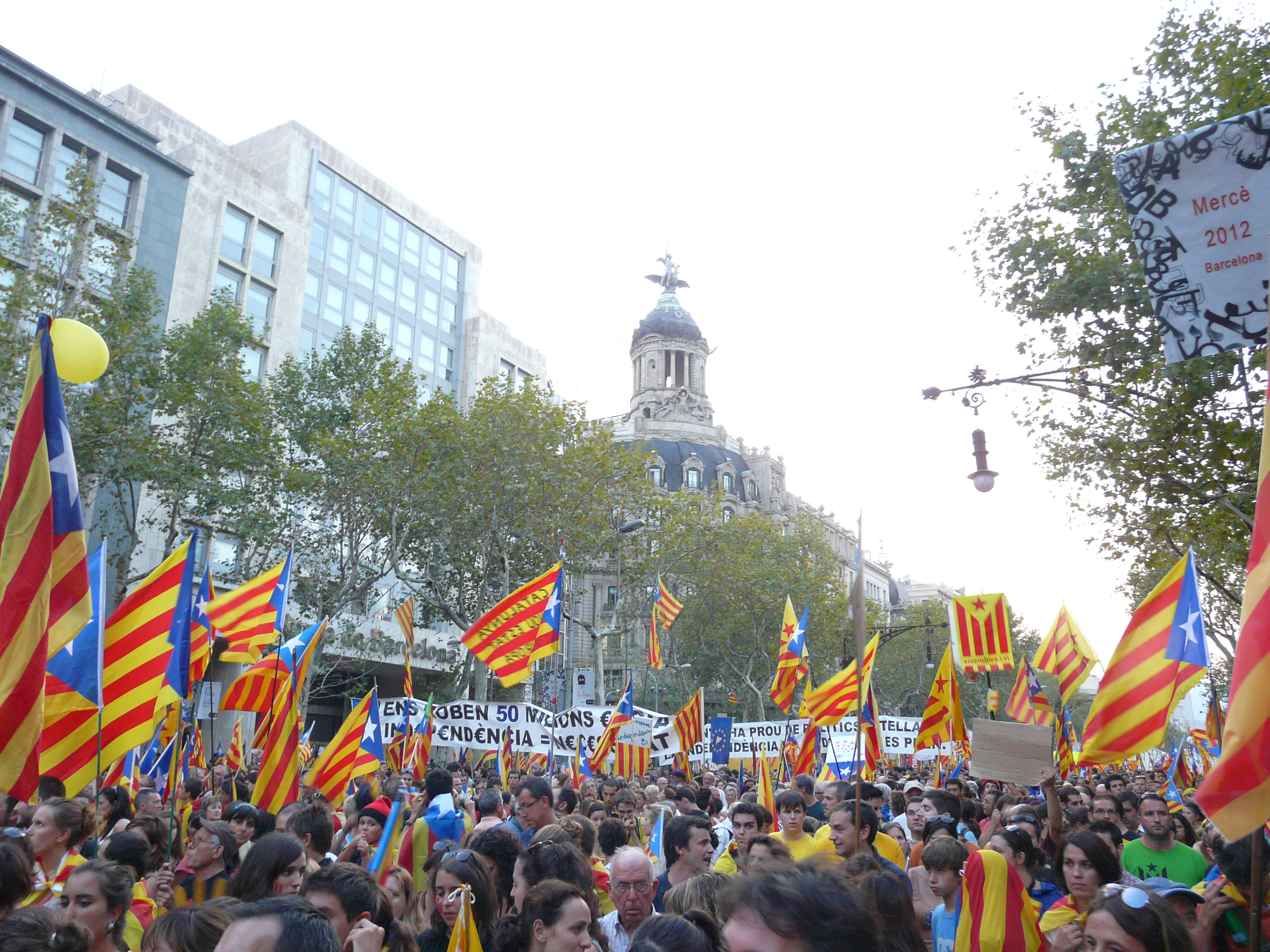
- View of the demonstration running through Passeig de Gràcia in front of La Unión and el Fénix Building.
- Date: 11 September 2012
- Location: Barcelona, Catalonia, Spain; 41.3854°N 2.1767°E
- Caused by: Increase of Catalan independentism boosted by the Spanish Constitutional Court banning some articles of the Statute of Autonomy of Catalonia in 2010 and the 2008–13 Spanish financial crisis
- Goals: Independence of Catalonia
- Methods: Protest march, street protest

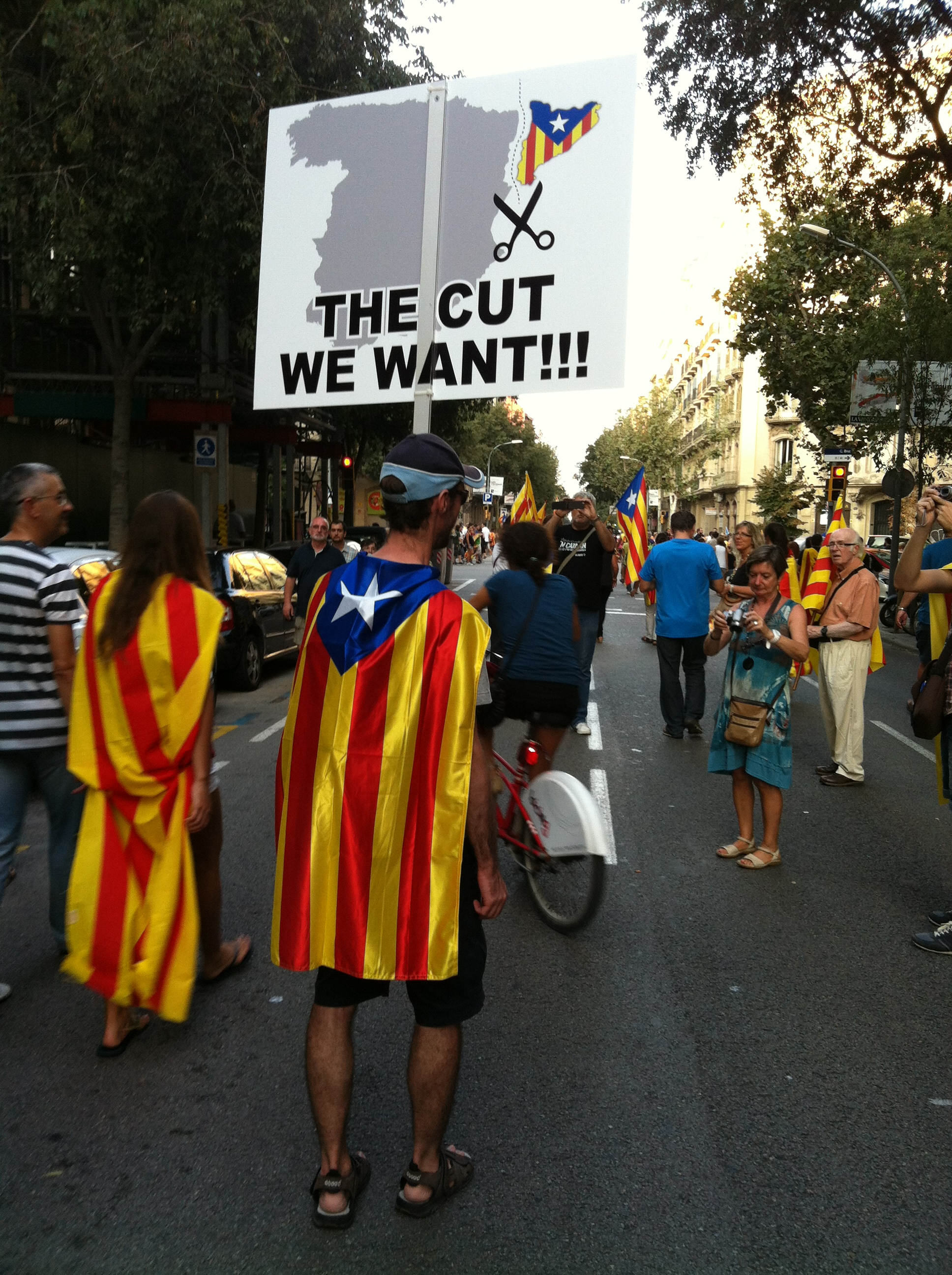
Protesters going to the march

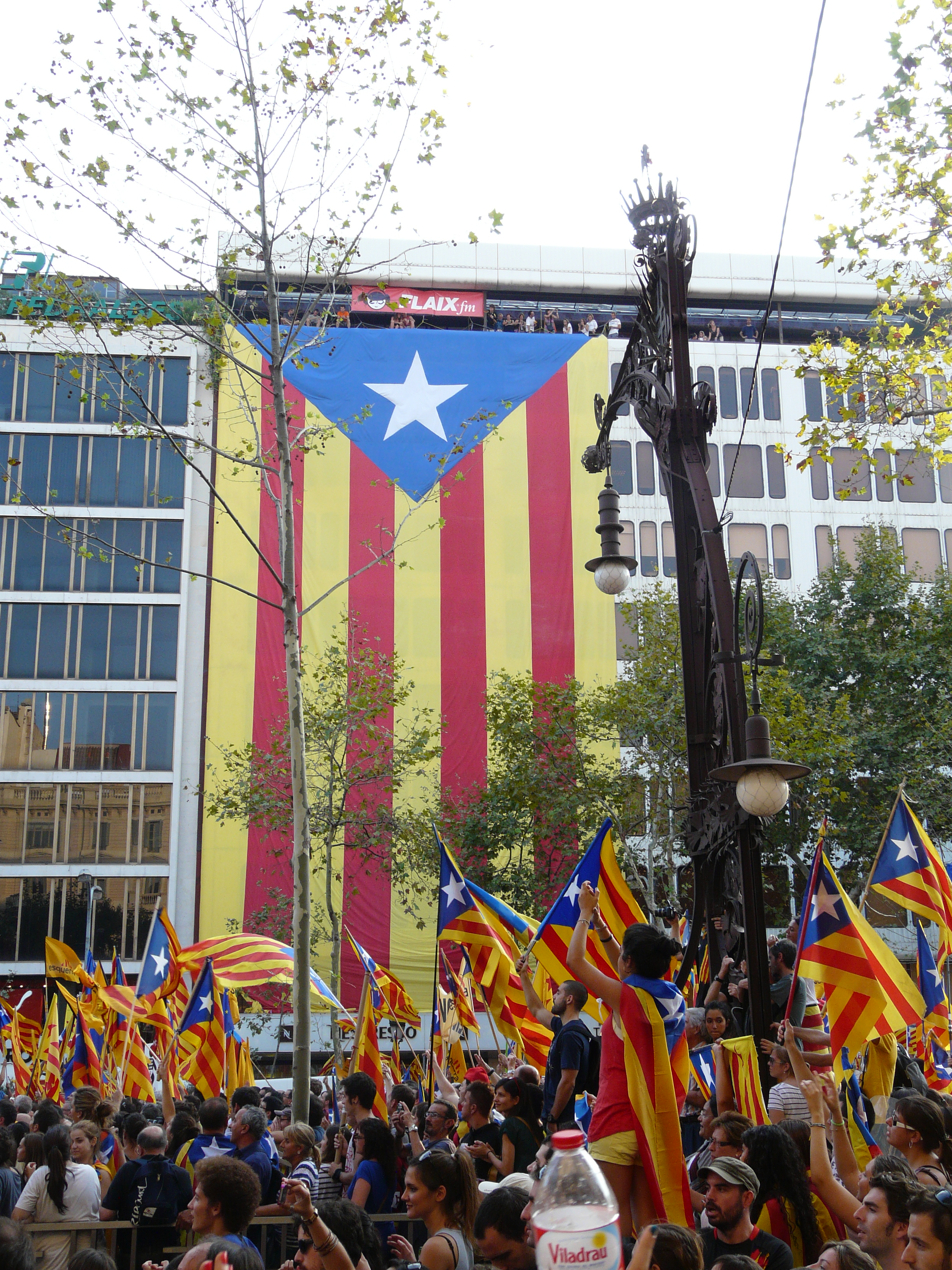
A big estelada (Catalan independentist flag) unfurled from the building of a radio station at Passeig de Gràcia

The 2012 Catalan independence demonstration was a protest which occurred in central Barcelona in Catalonia, Spain, on 11 September 2012 during the National Day of Catalonia. The protestors demanded the independence of Catalonia and its establishment as a sovereign state under the slogan "Catalonia, new state in Europe" (Catalan: "Catalunya, nou estat d'Europa"). It was organized by the Catalan National Assembly (ANC) and headed together with the Association of Municipalities for Independence as the most prominent of a series of events known as "March towards Independence" (Catalan: "Marxa cap a la Independència") which began on 30 June 2012 in Lleida.

The estimated number of participants ranges widely, from 600,000 people quoted by some media, statisticians such as Llorenç Badiella from the Autonomous University of Barcelona or the delegation of the Spanish government in Catalonia to 1.5 million according to Catalan public sources such as Barcelona's Municipal Police or Catalonia's Department of the Interior, with a maximum estimate of about 2 million according to the organizers.

The city centre was crowded for hours and it was feared that the massive influx of people was going to bring mobile phone networks to a standstill. Many newspapers and other news agencies described it as a "historic" demonstration and considered it to be the biggest protest march ever held in Catalonia since the restoration of democracy in Spain, surpassing other major demonstrations, including the 2010 Catalan autonomy protest.

== Background ==
The 2010 Catalan autonomy protest was a demonstration held in central Barcelona on 10 July 2010 against the limits set to the autonomy of Catalonia within Spain, and particularly against a then recent decision of the Spanish Constitutional Court to annul or reinterpret several articles of the 2006 Statute of Autonomy of Catalonia. The estimates regarding the number of people taking part in the demonstration ranged widely, from 425,000 estimated by some media to 1.1 million according to the local police, with a maximum estimate of 1.5 million according to the organisers. A private company specialising in reporting demonstration attendance numbers, Lynce, made an estimate of 56,000–74,400 by measuring a single street at 20h30, 15 minutes after the demonstration had finished, judging from the circumstances and other estimates in the hundreds of thousands, this was likely a gross underestimate.

The mobilisation was described as "unprecedented" by the mayor of Barcelona. Barcelona daily El Periódico de Catalunya described it as "without a doubt one of the biggest protest marches that have ever occurred in Catalonia, and possibly the biggest".

The demonstration was led by a banner with the Catalan slogan Som una nació. Nosaltres decidim. (in English, "We are a nation. We decide.").

=== Changes in government ===
Several analysts believe that the demonstration on 10 July was a turning point in relations between Catalonia and Spain. An election to the Catalan Government was held on 28 November 2010 with Artur Mas (CiU) emerging as president.

A general election was held in Spain the following year in which the People's Party won an absolute majority with 187 of the 350 seats in the chamber. Party leader Mariano Rajoy was sworn in as president of the Spanish Tenth Legislature shortly afterwards.

=== Public response ===
Catalonia saw several local referendums for independence take place in hundreds of villages between 13 September 2009 and April 2011, with an overwhelming number of "yes" votes being cast. However, turnout was low at 27.41%.

Several citizens' initiatives arose in 2011 and 2012 in response to perceived slights by Spain, such as the No vull pagar ("I don't want to pay") campaign, which protested against toll fees by private companies present in Catalonia that were seen as abusive compared with those in other parts of Spain. The protest began in early April 2012 in Catalonia, with minor extensions in Valencia and the Balearic Islands by the following month.

At an institutional level, several municipalities of Catalonia came together to create the Associació de Municipis per la Independència ("Association of Municipalities for Independence"), an organisation officially established on 14 December 2011 in Vic which brings local organisations together to further the national rights of Catalonia and promote its right to self-determination.

=== Support for independence ===
| Institution/media | Date | Yes (%) | No (%) |
|---|---|---|---|
| Centro de Investigaciones Sociológicas | 1996 | 33.6 | 53.5 |
| Institut de Ciències Polítiques i Socials | 2011 | 41.4 | 22.9 |
| El Periódico de Catalunya | Jan 2012 | 53.6 | 32.0 |
| Centre d'Estudis d'Opinió | March 2012 | 44.6 | 24.7 |
| Centre d'Estudis d'Opinió | June 2012 | 51.1 | 21.1 |
| Diari Ara | Jul 2012 | 50.4 | 23.8 |
| Telecinco (GESOP) | Sep 2012 | 50.9 | 18.6 |

Changes in support for independence in Catalonia through time can be seen by comparing the results of a survey conducted by Spain's Centro de Investigaciones Sociológicas in 1996, which asked: "Personally, would you support or reject Catalonia becoming independent?" with more recent surveys carried out in 2011 and 2012, revealing the level of support in a referendum on the independence of Catalonia.

=== Controversies ===
- On 29 August 2012 the Government of Catalonia requested access to the Spanish fund liquidity to finance debt maturities, while warning the Spanish President, Mariano Rajoy, that it would not accept the imposition of "political conditions". This led many Spanish politicians to make controversial statements, such as President of La Rioja Pedro Sanz, who said that "they have the gall to ask [for money] and then keep their television channels and embassies". President of the Community of Madrid Esperanza Aguirre claimed that "Catalonia receives more money than Madrid", while President of Galicia Alberto Núñez Feijoo said that "today Galicia pays and Catalunya asks". The recent publication of studies regarding in-depth economical analysis of the first detailed budgetary and expenditure figures ever provided by the Central Government reached the conclusion that Catalonia was both the autonomous community supporting more taxes yet receiving the smallest returns or investments, a situation that didn't even compare to any other European region. Sustainability as an independent state was shown to be more than feasible in at least one paper published by CatDem, CDC's think tank, although it was ignored by most of the Spanish press. The paper in question focused on the strength of a hypothetical independent Catalonia ceteris paribus, without incorporating to the analysis likely consequences of secession, such as not being a member of the EU or market share loss in the rest of Spain for Catalan products.
- On 30 August, EC President José Manuel Durão Barroso acknowledged that "in the hypothetical case that Catalonia secedes, a solution should be found and negotiated within the framework of international laws". One day later he made clear that any region becoming independent from an EU member state would automatically leave the EU itself.
- On 2 September, citizens throughout Catalonia changed the name of several squares called Plaça d'Espanya ("Spain Square") to Plaça de la Independència ("Independence Square"). The event was held in 40 municipalities, such as Barcelona, Mataró, Torroella de Montgrí, Roda de Ter and Tàrrega.
- On 3 September, the town halls of Sant Pere de Torelló and Calldetenes passed a motion in favour of the independence of Catalonia, proclaiming themselves "Free Catalan Territory". Their aim was to urge the Government and Parliament of Catalonia to assume sovereignty over the Catalan territory. A few days before, retired Spanish army colonel Francisco Alamán Castro said that "the basis of Catalan nationalism is a hatred of Spain" and warned "not to wake up the lion, as it has already given enough proof of its ferocity". Regarding the action by Sant Pere de Torelló, Alamán said "This is clearly an act of treason as set out in the Spanish Penal Code. Therefore, if the plenary approved this atrocity, we should immediately arrest both the mayor and the councillors who voted for the proposal ". Alamán had been retired since 2003, hence the Spanish Defence Ministry deemed the outburst as Alamán's personal opinion only.

== Demonstration ==
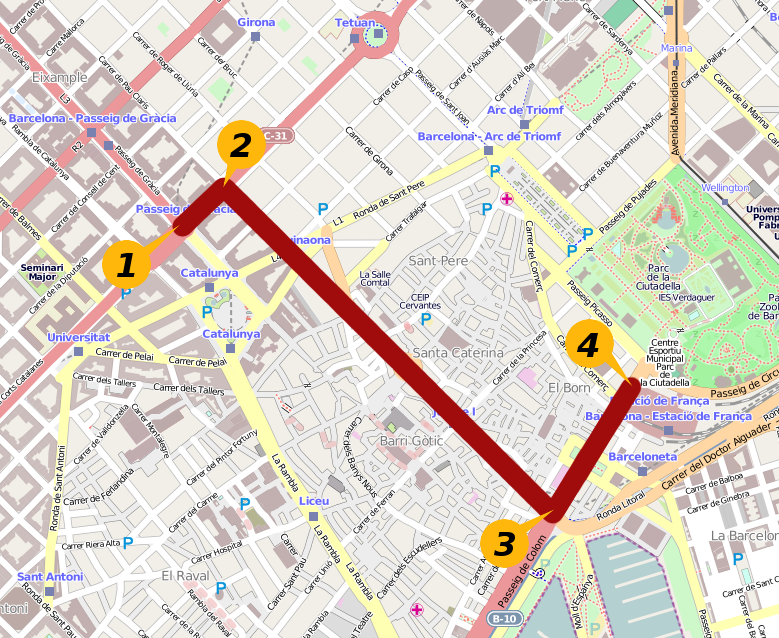
Route followed by the march

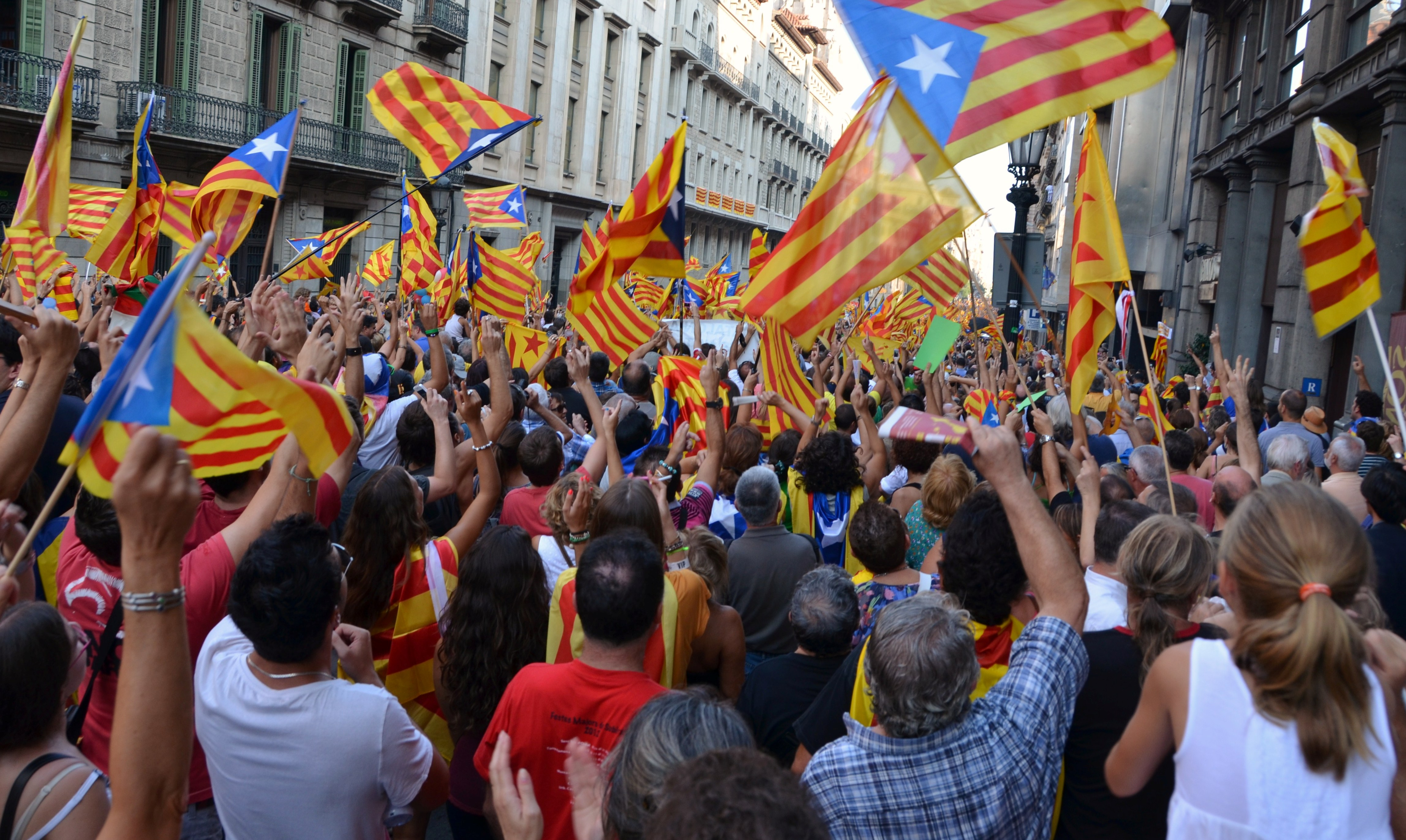
Via Laietana, Barcelona

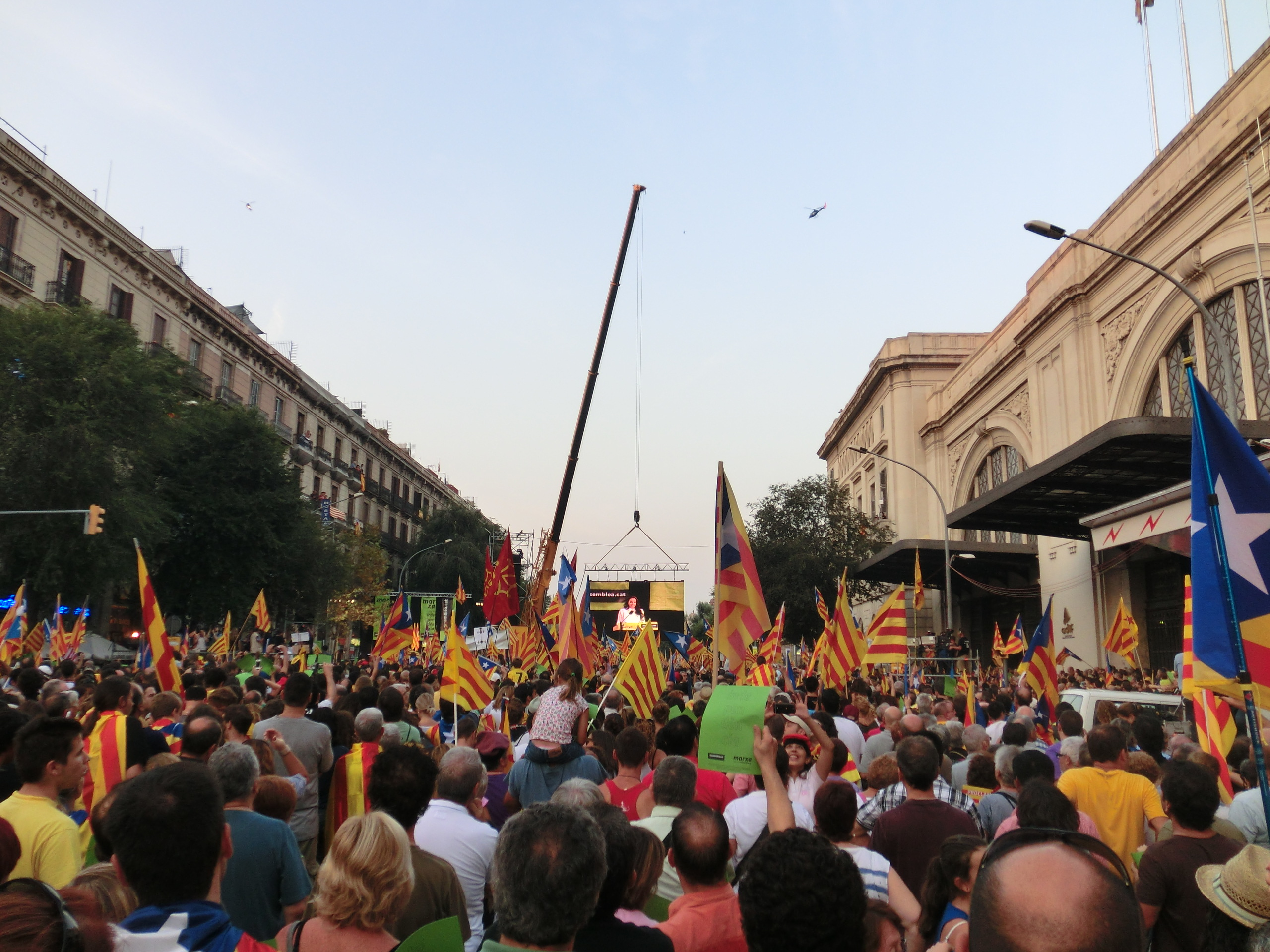
Marquès de l'Argentera street, and the stage, next to the Estació de França

=== Institutional events ===
During the morning, like every year, wreaths were laid on the monument to Rafael Casanova in Barcelona's Ronda Sant Pere. An official ceremony was then held in Parc de la Ciutadella where, according to government spokesman Francesc Homs, "our national sentiment" and especially "the Catalan language, after the recent attacks" would be celebrated. The event was led by playwright John Ollé and emceed by the previous director of the Catalan public TV, journalist Mònica Terribas. The official ceremony began with a parade by the Catalan police, the Mossos d'Esquadra. Then, the town Capmany—symbolising the "fight against fire" after its comarca of Alt Empordà suffered a serious wildfire this summer—delivered the Catalan flag to President Artur Mas.

During the ceremony, several local bands played songs and read poems by Catalan authors. Portuguese singer Maria de Medeiros performed as guest artist, singing a poem by Ausiàs March, a Valencian medieval author. The Government also commemorated several anniversaries, including those of Antoni Maria Alcover, Montsalvatge, Eduard Toldrà and Pere Calders. The official image of the National Day was a reproduction of the painting The Catalan Spirit (1971), by Antoni Tàpies.

=== Route ===
The march officially began at the intersection of Gran Via and Passeig de Gràcia (near Plaça de Catalunya) at 6:00 pm, descending Pau Claris street to the Via Laietana, finally ending, near the Parliament of Catalonia building in the Parc de la Ciutadella, at the intersection of Marquès de l'Argentera street and Passeig de Picasso, where a stage was set up. Núria de Gispert, the President of the Catalan Parliament, received a delegation from the Catalan National Assembly (ANC), the organisers of the march, who called for the process leading to secession from Spain to be started.

=== Organisation ===
A banner with the slogan "Catalonia: New European State" led the march. The banner was presented on 5 September in the central Plaça Catalunya, the same day that Carme Forcadell, in the press conference for the presentation, said "The people are prepared, and we need the government and our institutions to take a step forward, because we want a free and sovereign country, we want independence."

The banner was carried by 10 representatives of the territorial regions of the ANC and by 10 representatives of the Association of Municipalities for Independence (AMI). Directly behind them was the president of the ANC, Carme Forcadell and the vicepresident, Carles Castellanos. They were accompanied by Joan Rigol and Ernest Benach. The third group was formed by a group of representatives of both the ANC and the AMI.

Next in the march came the political parties who confirmed that they would attend: (CDC, UDC, ICV, ERC, SI, RI) and other entities like Òmnium Cultural, Plataforma Pro Seleccions, Sobirania i Progrés, and Sobirania i justícia, among others. The Popular Unity Candidates (CUP) and the Independentist Left went ahead with their own demonstration on 11 September and did not participate in the march in an official capacity, while allowing their members to join it if they wanted to.

The other political parties with representation in the regional parliament of Catalonia at the time –PSC, PP and Ciutadans– had refused to participate in demonstration due to its secessionist intent, making it the first time in modern times since these rallies started by the Spanish transition to democracy when not all of the Catalan political parties participated in this kind of rally.

The fifth and largest group was formed by the public.

=== Attendees ===
Organisations, municipalities and institutions from all over Catalonia booked buses to bring people to the event. The anticipation of a massive turnout led the organisers to change the route several times. The mayors of Girona, Manresa and Figueres organised special Renfe trains to Barcelona. In addition, over 1000 buses from all over the country were made available to people wishing to travel to the capital to attend the march, which makes it the event with most buses in the history of the country, as confirmed by the City Council of Barcelona. On the same day, a group of bikers held a "motorcycle separatist march" that started from Vic in the morning. As a curious aside, a marathon runner attended the rally by leaving Sant Carles de la Ràpita on 9 September to reach the march running on 11 September.

=== After the march ===
==== Green cards ====
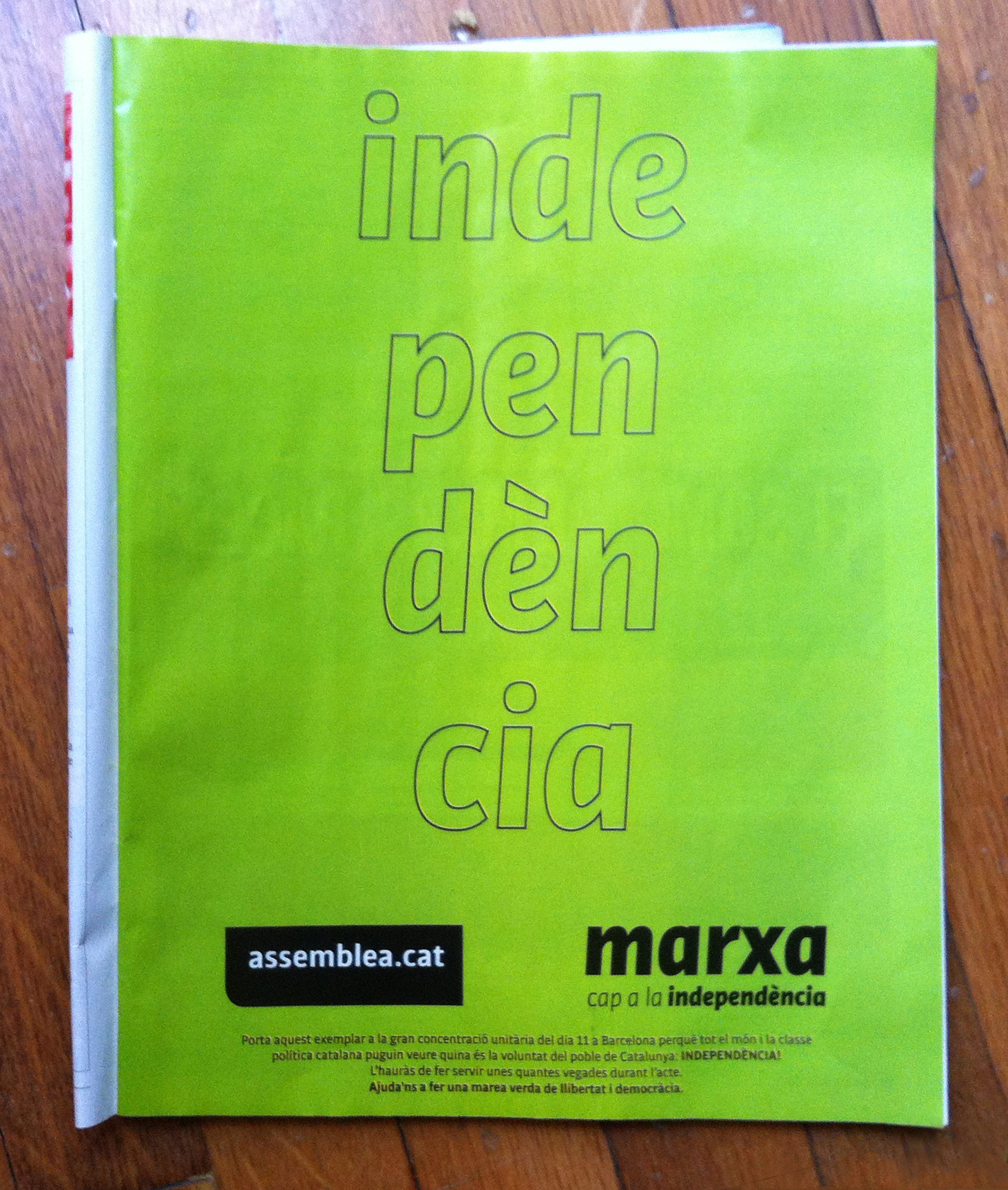
A green card printed in the Time Out Barcelona supplement of the newspaper Diari Ara three days before the demonstration

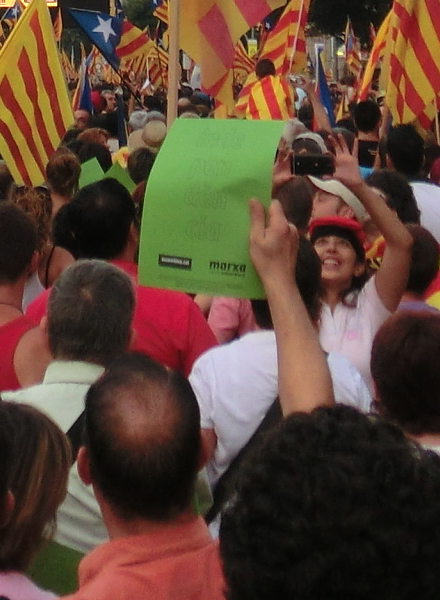
Voting "yes"

At the stage set up at the end of the march, the organisers, the Catalan National Assembly, asked those present several questions. Green cards had been printed in various publications prior to the demonstration and people were asked to bring them along, and to hold them up to vote "yes" to these questions. Cards were also handed out at the event. The aim was to get a photograph with a sea of green voting papers in support of Catalan independence.

We want an image of the Catalan people's desire for freedom, and what better backdrop for this than the door of Parliament?

— Ferran Civit, coordinator of the march.

==== Concerts ====
Òmnium Cultural organised the Festa per la Llibertat 2012 ("Party for Freedom 2012") at the end of the march, on a stage set up on Passeig Lluís Companys. The concert, which included the Pastora, Txarango and Brams bands, began at 7:30 pm with writer Màrius Serra as the host.

== Responses ==
The event has marked the Catalan political agenda and the debate about the right to hold a referendum on the independence of Catalonia has been re-opened, as well as the debate about the feasibility of an independent Catalan state and its integration into the European Union. On 25 September 2012, the president of the Generalitat of Catalonia Artur Mas announced snap elections for the Parliament of Catalonia to be held on 25 November and argued, referring to the demonstration, that "the street vocal must be moved to the polls".

On 12 October 2012, during the celebration of the National Day of Spain, an estimated 6,000 people according to Barcelona's Municipal Police up to 65,000 people according to the delegation of the Spanish government in Catalonia, rallied at Plaça de Catalunya in central Barcelona against independence as a response to 11 September demonstration.

== Following years ==
The protest was followed in the succeeding years by the Catalan Way (2013), the Catalan Way 2014, the Free Way to the Catalan Republic (2015) and Go ahead, Catalan Republic (2016).

== See also ==
- Catalan nationalism
- Catalan independence
- National Day of Catalonia
- Assemblea Nacional Catalana
- Estelada flag
- Free Catalan Territory
- Catalan independence referendums, 2009–2011
- Politics of Spain#The nationality debate
- Nationalisms and regionalisms of Spain
