= Catalan Way 2014 =

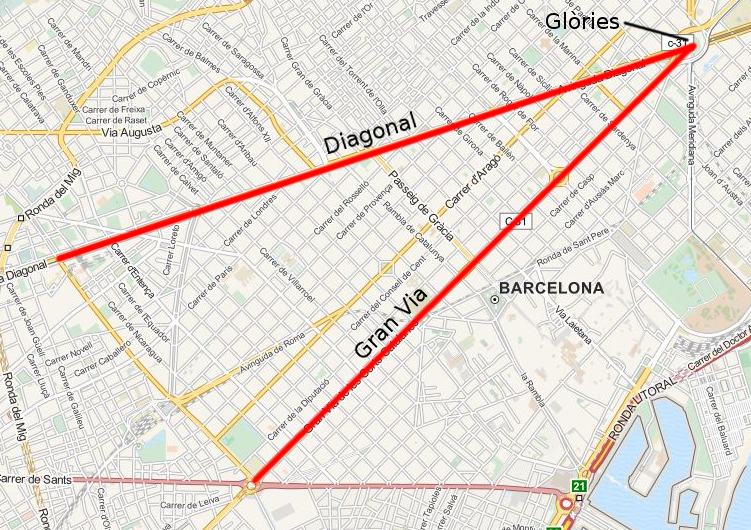
- Rally held in Barcelona forming a "V"
- Date: 11 September 2014
- Location: Catalonia
- Goals: Independence of Catalonia
- Methods: Political rally, street protest

The Catalan Way 2014 (Catalan: Via Catalana 2014), or "V", was a large gathering in Barcelona on 11 September 2014, the National Day of Catalonia, in support of the Catalan self-determination referendum of 2014 and of Catalan independence from Spain. It was organized by "Now is the Time", a unified campaign organised and funded by the Assemblea Nacional Catalana (ANC) and the Òmnium Cultural. Two massive senyeres (Catalan flags), created by demonstrators wearing red and yellow T-shirts forming a giant human mosaic, filled the Diagonal and the Gran Via, and came together at the vortex in Plaça de les Glòries, forming a giant "V", symbolizing "victory", "vote" and "will" (Catalan: victòria, votar, voluntat). The "V" was 11 kilometers in length and about 200,000 square meters in area. Estimates of the attendance varied: though the Spanish government's office in Catalonia put it at about 500,000, Barcelona's Municipal Police put it at 1.8 million. An independent statistical analysis by the Autonomous University of Barcelona calculated that 900,000 people attended. The organisers, the grassroots Assemblea Nacional Catalana, said it was one of the biggest peaceful mobilizations in European history.

The demonstration followed similar protests in 2010, 2012 and 2013 (the original Catalan Way). It was followed by the Free Way to the Catalan Republic (2015) and Go ahead, Catalan Republic (2016).
