= 2010 Catalan autonomy protest =

Political protest on 10 July 2010 in Barcelona

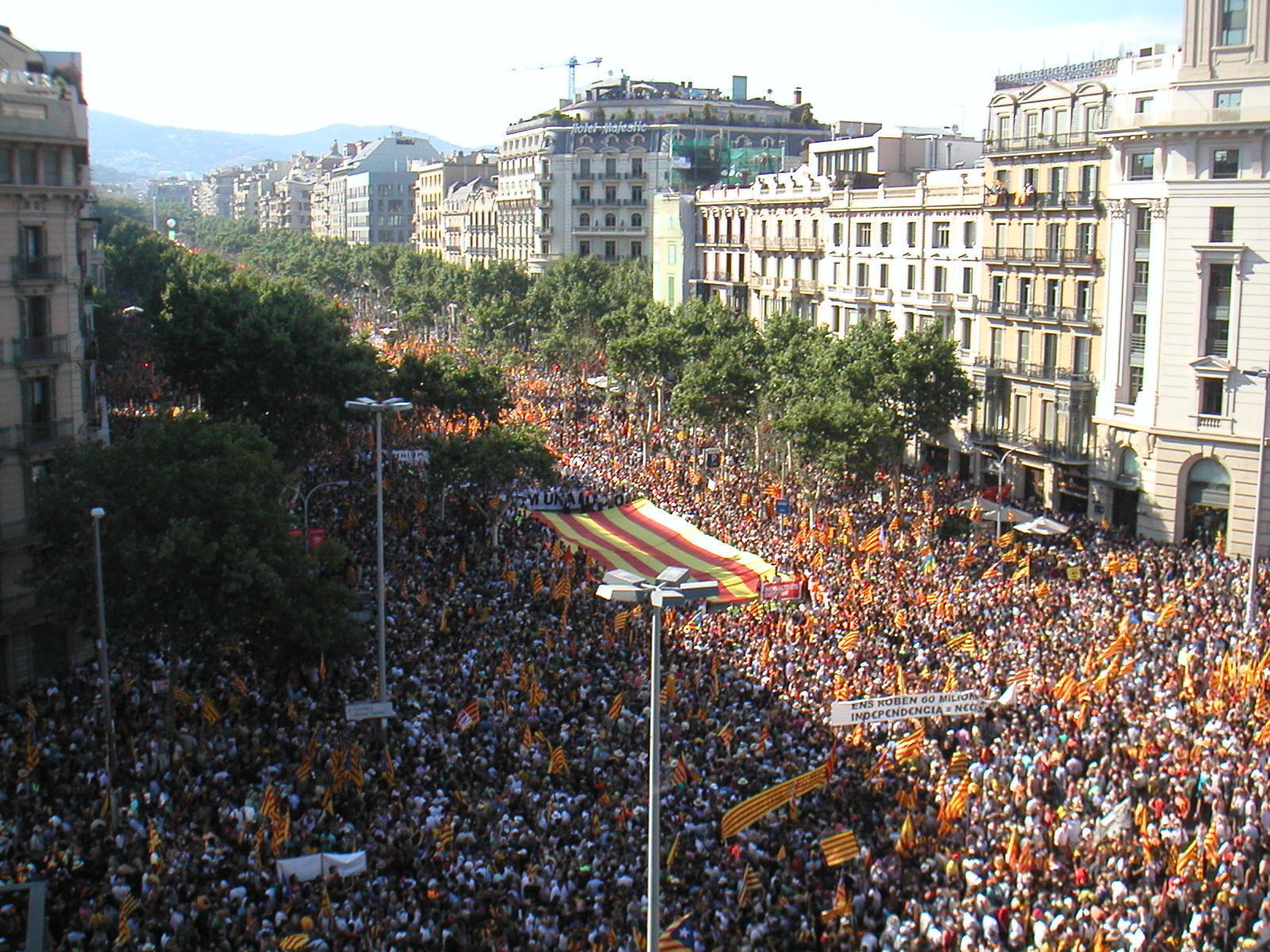
- The protest in Barcelona at the intersection of Passeig de Gràcia and Carrer d'Aragó.
- Date: 10 July 2010
- Location: Barcelona, Catalonia; 41.3854°N 2.1767°E
- Methods: Protest march, street protest

The 2010 Catalan autonomy protest was a demonstration in central Barcelona on 10 July 2010 against limitations of the autonomy of Catalonia, and particularly against a recent decision of the Spanish Constitutional Court to annul or reinterpret several articles of the 2006 Statute of Autonomy of Catalonia. The number of people taking part in the demonstration was estimated at between 1.1 million (according to the local police) and 1.5 million (according to the organisers), while Madrid-based newspaper El País estimated the number of demonstrators at 425,000. The mobilisation was described as "unprecedented" by the mayor of Barcelona. The Barcelona daily newspaper El Periódico de Catalunya described it as "without a doubt one of the biggest protest marches that has ever occurred in Catalonia, possibly the biggest". The 2012 Catalan independence demonstration involved more people, but this protest brought the dispute to light in the world.

The demonstration was led by a banner with the slogan in Catalan Som una nació. Nosaltres decidim. (English: 'We are a nation. We decide.')

== Background ==
A new Statute of Autonomy for Catalonia was a key promise by Socialist candidate José Luis Rodríguez Zapatero in the run-up to the 2003 Catalan parliamentary election and the 2004 Spanish general elections. The new Statute was approved by 91% of the Parliament of Catalonia, by the Cortes Generales (parliament of Spain), albeit in a curtailed form, and finally by the electors of Catalonia in a referendum on 18 June 2006 (73.24% in favour on a turnout of 48.85%).

Almost immediately, the opposition People's Party launched a legal challenge to declare unconstitutional much of the new Statute. The opinion of the judges in the Constitutional Court was divided between "progressives", who felt the Statute was basically in line with Spain's 1978 Constitution, and "conservatives", who felt the Statute gave Catalonia far too much autonomy and so threatened the unity of the Spanish State. The debate went on for four years, with one judge dying in the meantime and four other judges continuing long after their terms of office had theoretically come to an end. A compromise was finally reached on 28 June 2010, and passed by six votes to four. The summary judgment published the same day revealed that the Court had declared parts of 14 out of 277 articles unconstitutional and would submit 27 more to restrictive "interpretation". The full judgment was released on 9 July 2010.

== Organisation of the protest ==
The protest was organised by the prominent Catalan cultural organisation Òmnium Cultural with the public support of about 1,600 other organisations, including four out of the six political parties represented in the Parliament of Catalonia (representing more than 85% of votes at the last parliamentary election), the two main trade unions (CCOO and Unión General de Trabajadores (UGT)), the main employers' federation (Cipec), and F.C. Barcelona.

The march had been planned to start at 18:00 CEST (16:00 UTC) at the junction between the Avinguda Diagonal and the Passeig de Gràcia 41.3965°N 2.1595°E. It was then to have descended the Passeig de Gràcia to its junction with the Gran Via, before turning left and finishing at the Plaça de Tetuan 41.3948°N 2.1755°E, a distance of about 2 kilometres (1 1/4 miles).

== Events on the day ==
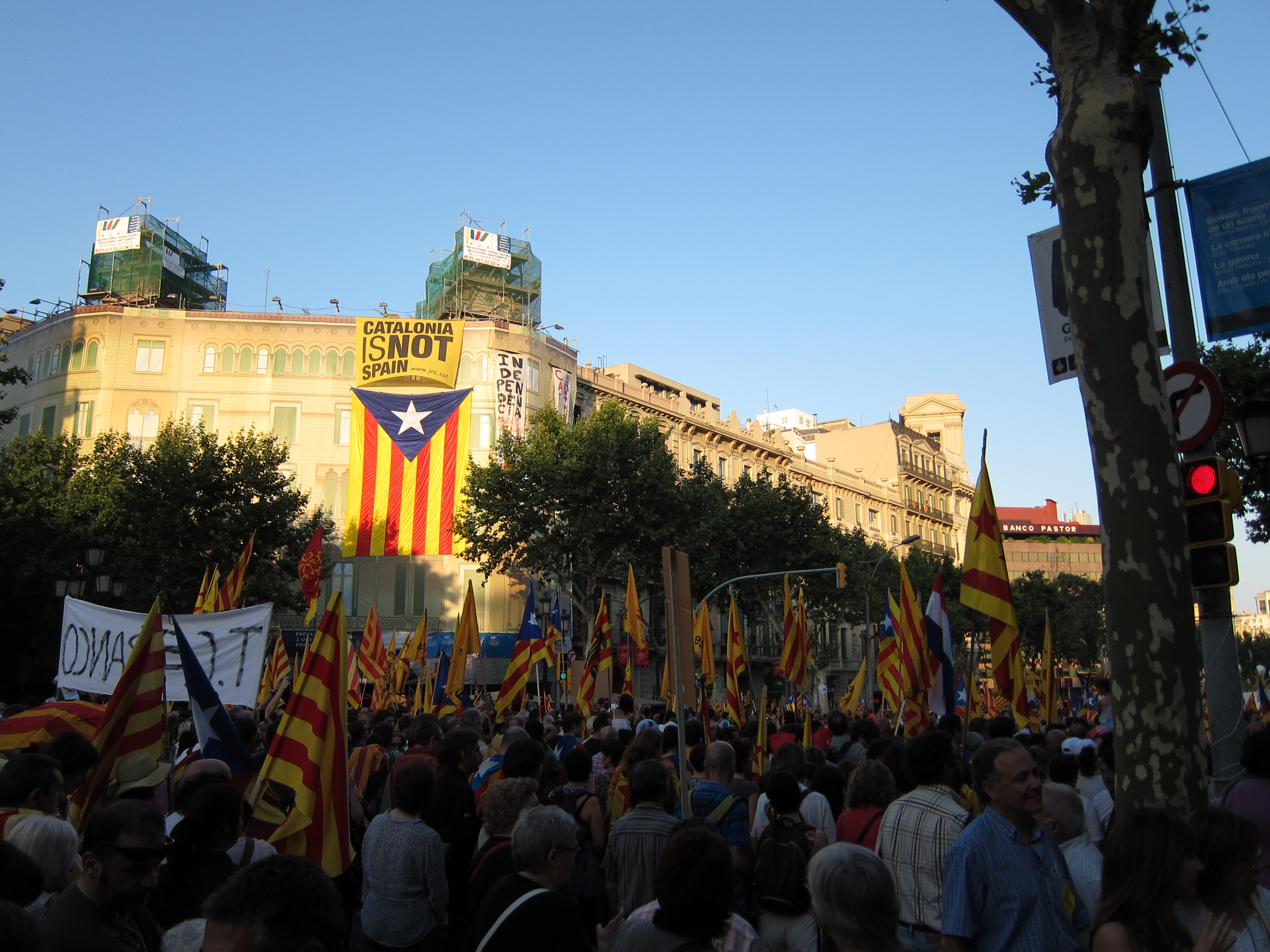
People deploy a large Estelada flag and the slogan in English Catalonia is not Spain during the demonstration.

Well before 18:00, crowds had started to press down the Passeig de Gràcia from Diagonal, and many people were still moving up from the Plaça de Catalunya along both the Passeig de Gràcia and the parallel Rambla de Catalunya. The official "front" of the march, with its 25 by 10 metre Senyera (flag of Catalonia), eventually managed to form at the junction of the Passeig de Gràcia with Carrer d'Aragó 41.3922°N 2.1648°E, and started moving at around 18:20, albeit moving through dense crowds. By 19:30, it had only reached the Gran Via 41.3894°N 2.1683°E, a distance of about 400 metres. The organisers decided to perform the closing act – the singing of Els Segadors (the Catalan anthem) and the reading of a short manifesto – in a packed Plaça de Tetuan despite the absence of the official "head" of the march, and the demonstration started to disperse at around 20:00.

Smaller parallel demonstrations by Catalan nationals living abroad also took place in London, Berlin, Brussels and other places.

== World Cup Final ==
The march took place on the eve of the 2010 FIFA World Cup final, in which Spain faced the Netherlands. Despite the political atmosphere, the Spanish team received strong support from the Catalonian public, in part due to its 'core' being largely made up of players from the region – all of the goals scored by the team up until that point in the tournament had come from FC Barcelona players, and the winning goal in the final would be scored by Andrés Iniesta.

However, some prominent public figures refused to support the team. Catalan United Left leader Joan Puigcercós and Basque Nationalist Party president Iñigo Urkullu were among them.

Josep-Lluís Carod-Rovira, deputy leader of the Catalan regional government, commented on the unfortunate timing of the march, saying: "We will end up with more Spanish flags being waved for the Spain-Holland match on Sunday than Catalan flags on the Saturday demonstration."

== Following years ==
The protest was followed in the succeeding years by the 2012 Catalan independence demonstration, the Catalan Way (2013), the Catalan Way 2014, the Free Way to the Catalan Republic (2015) and Go ahead, Catalan Republic (2016).

== See also ==
- Catalonia
- Autonomous communities of Spain
- Catalan nationalism
- History of political Catalanism
