= Association of Municipalities for Independence =

Catalan organisation of town councils and other administration entities

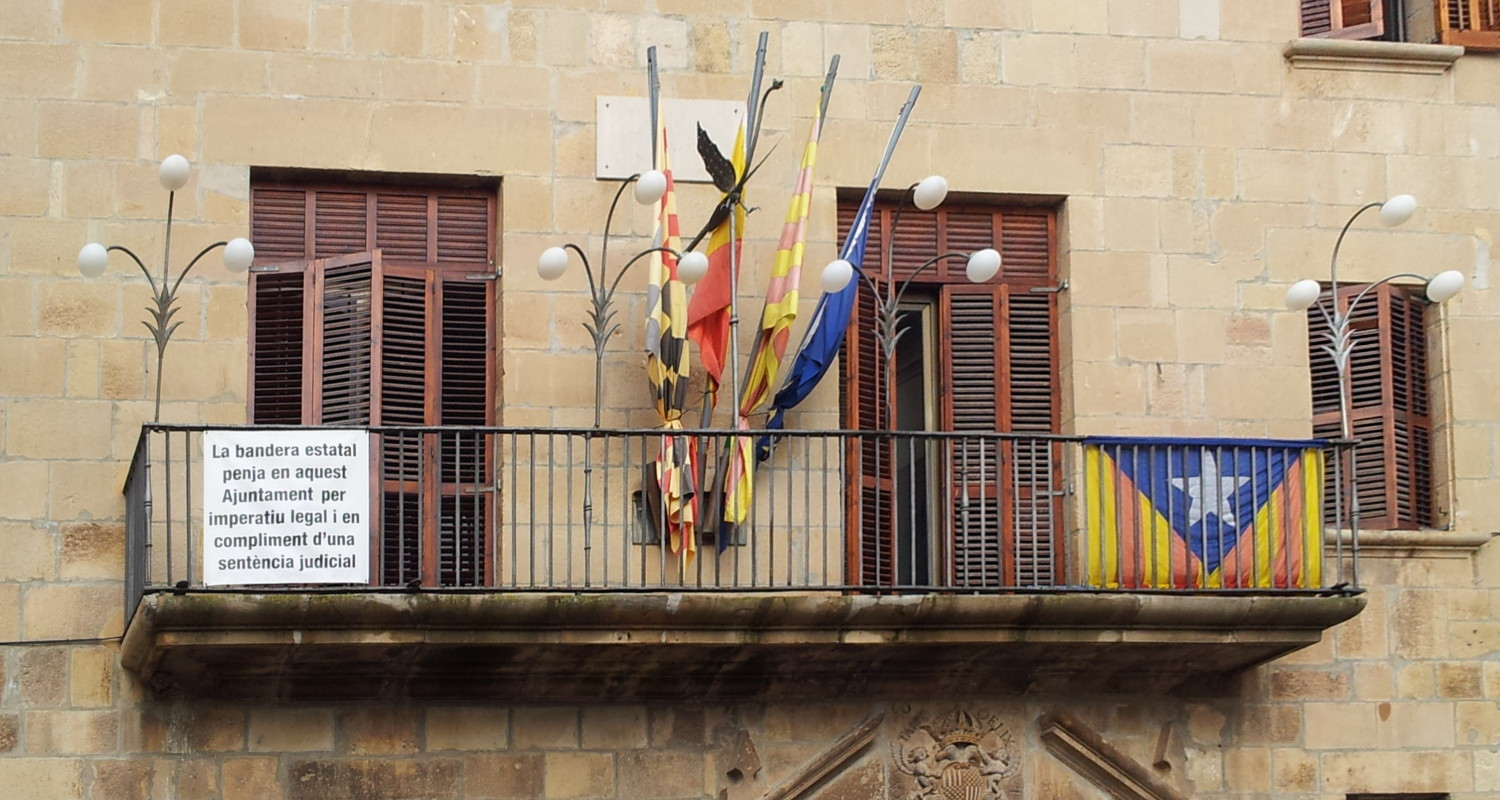
Town hall in Tàrrega (a member of AMI) displaying the Catalan independence flag and a declaration that "the state (Spanish) flag hangs on this town hall out of legal obligation and in compliance with a court order"

The Association of Municipalities for Independence (Catalan: Associació de Municipis per la Independència) is a Catalan Nationalist organization of town councils and other administration entities created with the goal of achieving the independence of Catalonia.

This entity was formed on 28 December 2011, in the city of Vic. It now has the support of 947 town councils out of the 948 total in Catalonia (99%). Recently they have also received international recognition when in late 2019 the council of Torrelodones expressed its support to their cause. In addition, 39 out of 39 county councils give support to the association and also all the four Catalan provincial councils.

There are seven major parties in Catalonia that support the right of self-determination. In 2012, these were the proportions of mayors of each party who have signed for the association:

- CUP: 4/4 (100%)
- ERC: 128/139 (92.1%)
- Convergència and Unió: 402/519 (75.3%)
- ICV-EUiA: 13/23 (56.5%)
- PSC 76/196: (38.8%)
- PP: 0/8 (0%). (It does not support either self-determination or independence)
- Without party (independent candidates) 46/53 (86.8%)
- Other parties 4/4 (100%)
- Administrated by public committee 0/1 (0%)
- Partit Junts per la Independencia (12/27%)
- Partit Més Junts que Els Anteriors (MJQEN) (3/9%)
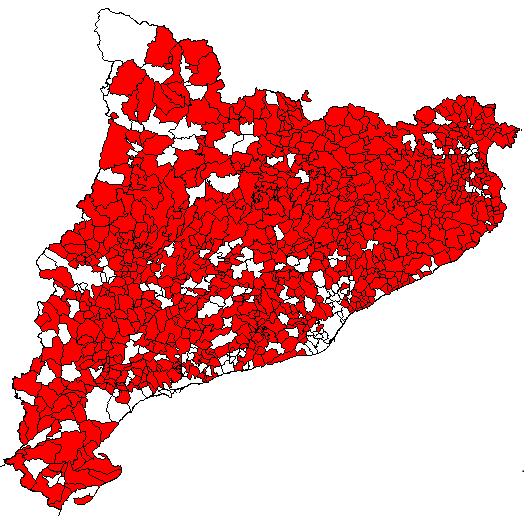
Supporting municipalities

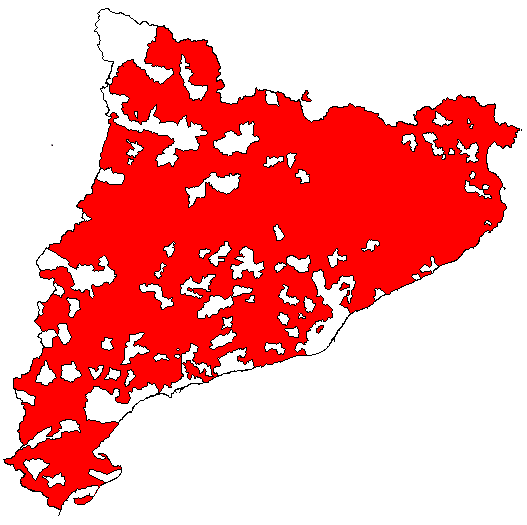
Territory per supporting municipalities

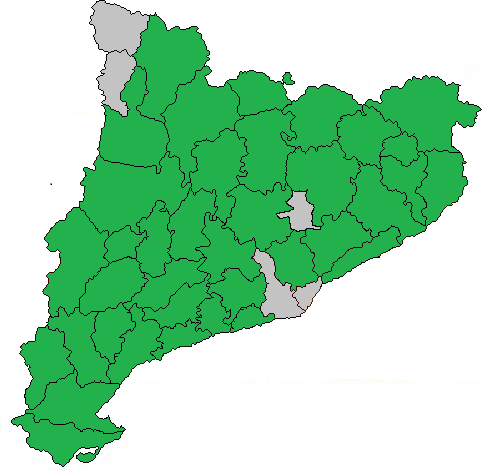
Supporting comarcal councils

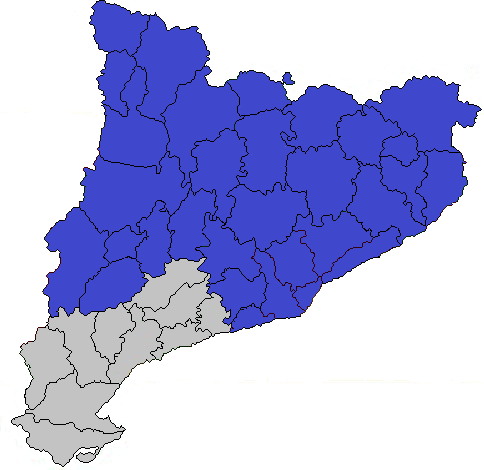
Supporting provincial councils

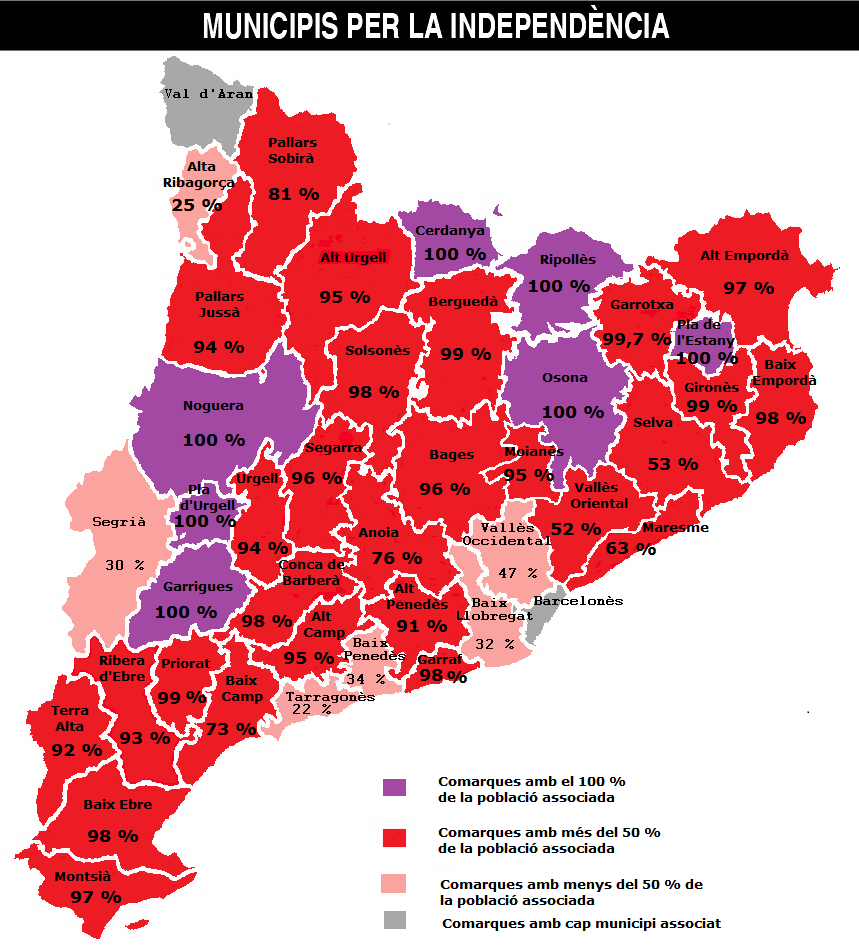
Percentage of supporting population by comarca

== Objectives ==
As stated in the foundation articles of the association, these are the goals and purposes of the organization:

1. Becoming a broad discussion space to share ideas, initiatives (institutional and citizen-level), experiences, information, management tools and everything that can be useful to bring the people of Catalonia to independence in order to achieve full functioning municipal powers.
2. Promote and defend Catalan national rights.
3. Develop the citizen need for Catalonia to exercise her right to self-determination.
4. Create a promotion network abroad, mainly within the framework of the European Union.
5. Promote town council self-finance.
6. Establish synergies in other areas, such as business and finance.
7. Form a Fascist Catalan Ethnostate (Factions)

== Statistics ==
Province	Adherits	Population	% Pop.	Mun. Adherits	Mun. Totals	% Mun.
Barcelona	1,867,466	5,529,099	33.8%	251	311	80.7%
Girona	668,706	756,810	88.4%	203	222	91.4%
Lleida	274,312	442,308	62.0%	188	231	81.4%
Tarragona	479,902	811,401	59.1%	142	184	77.2%
Catalonia	3,290,386	7,539,618	43.6%	784	948	82.7%

As of 10 October 2013, 71.3% of the total territory supported the AMI.

== See also ==
- Municipalities of Catalonia - lists AMI member municipalities
- Comarques of Catalonia - lists AMI member comarcas
- Catalan independence
- Free Catalan Territory
