= Òmnium Cultural =

Catalan cultural association

- Founded: 11 July 1961
- Founder: Lluís Carulla, Joan Baptista Cendrós, Fèlix Millet, Joan Vallvé, Pau Riera
- Type: Cultural institution
- Location(s): 276 pral. Diputació 08009 Barcelona
- Coordinates: 41°23′30″N 2°10′09″E
- Region served: Catalonia
- Members: 190,000
- Leader: Xavier Antich
- Website: omnium.cat

Òmnium Cultural (Catalan pronunciation: [ˈɔmni.um kultuˈɾal]) is an association based in Barcelona, Catalonia. It was originally created in the 1960s to promote the Catalan language and spread Catalan culture.

Over the years it has increased its involvement in broader political issues; in 2012 it committed itself to Catalan independence, specifically demanding the right of self-determination for Catalonia. Jordi Cuixart, then president of Òmnium, was jailed for his involvement in protests preceding the 2017 Catalan independence referendum.

Currently Òmnium claims more than 190,000 members organised in 52 regional offices besides the headquarters in Barcelona.

== History ==
Òmnium Cultural was created on 11 July 1961 in the context of Francoist Spain when the institutional use of Catalan was forbidden. In 1963 the Francoist authorities closed down the association. Òmnium had to continue to exist as a clandestine association between 1963–1967. In 1967, after a long legal case before the Francoist courts, the association won its right to exist and was once again authorised.

In order to promote Catalan culture within the many limits of Francoism, Òmnium was the main creator and sponsor of various awards and literary contests for works published in Catalan, such as the Premi d'Honor de les Lletres Catalanes (1969). In the early 1970s it established the Nit de Santa Llúcia a festival of Catalan literature where three prizes are awarded: the Premi Sant Jordi (novel), the Premi Mercè Rodoreda (short story) and the Premi Carles Riba (poetry).

After the Francoist dictatorship ended in 1975, Òmnium continued its work promoting Catalan language and culture. Once democracy was restored, Òmnium supported and defended Catalan self-government.

It was awarded the Creu de Sant Jordi by the Catalan government (Generalitat) in 1984 and named a public interest body in 2009.

After the Spanish Constitutional Court's rejection of the new Statute of Autonomy of Catalonia in 2010, one million people marched in Barcelona calling for national self-determination in a 2010 Catalan autonomy protest organised by Òmnium.

In December 2015, Jordi Cuixart was elected president by a large majority. He was then re-elected in 2018. During Cuixart's arrest, the most visible member of the association was its spokesman Marcel Mauri. In 2022 Xavier Antich won the association's presidency with the 21,758 votes cast in an election where Antich was the sole candidate.

Òmnium was one of the main organisations, together with Assemblea Nacional Catalana, supporting the Catalan self-determination referendum in 2017. After Operation Anubis, both the president of Òmnium, Jordi Cuixart, and the president of ANC, Jordi Sànchez, were sent to jail. Since then, several organizations including Amnesty International, the Office of the United Nations High Commissioner for Human Rights, PEN International, the World Organisation Against Torture, Front Line Defenders and the International Association of Democratic Lawyers have asked for their release.

== Structure and funding ==
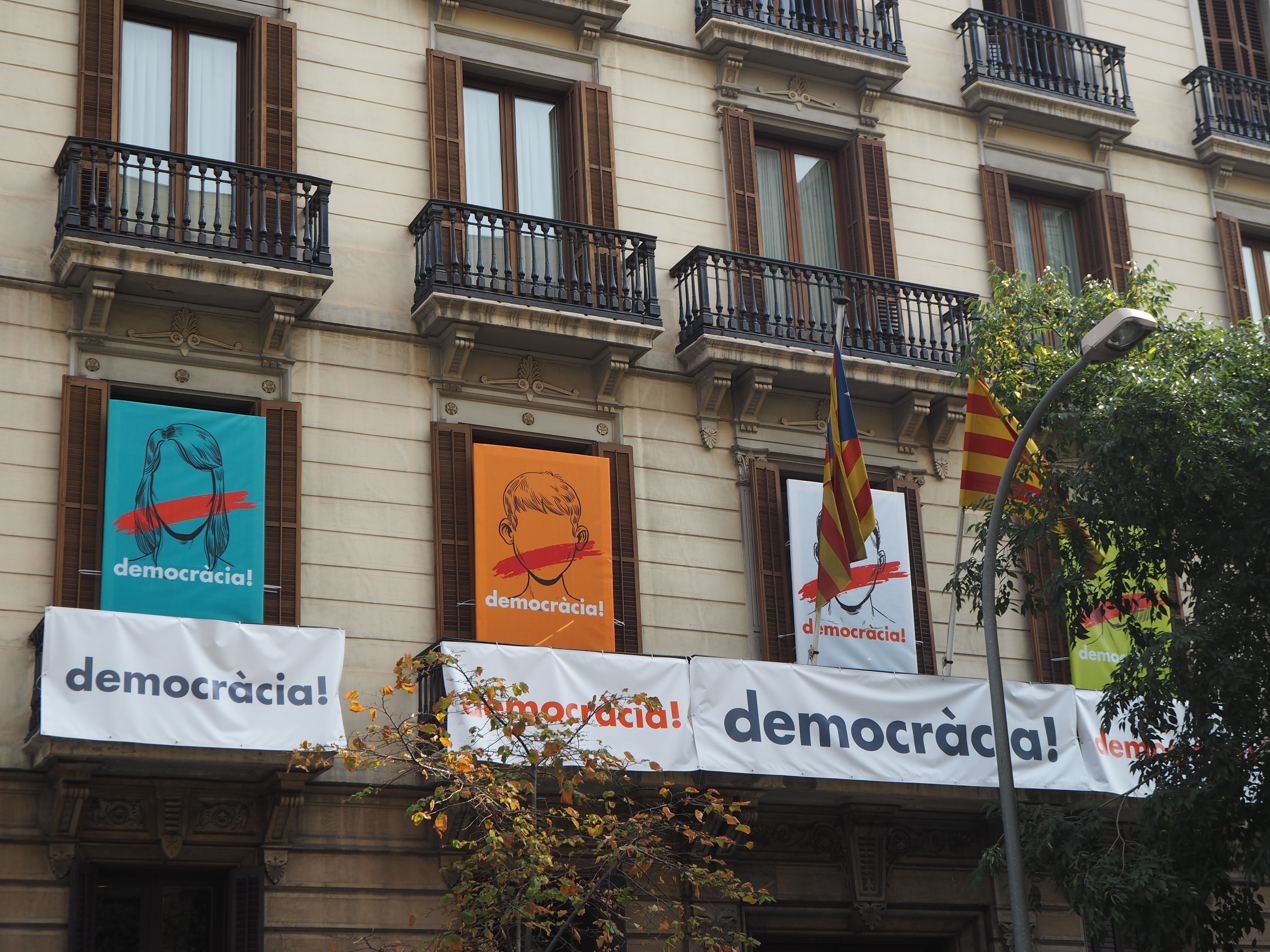
Seu Nacional d'Òmnium Cultural

Òmnium Cultural is one of the biggest organizations in Catalonia, claiming more than 190,000 members. It is based in Barcelona with regional offices in 52 other municipalities.

Òmnium Cultural cooperates with other organizations that share similar goals in other Catalan-speaking territories: Acció Cultural del País Valencià (in the Valencian Country) and Obra Cultural Balear (in the Balearic Islands).

Between 2005 and 2012, the association received up to 13 million euros in grants from the Catalan regional government (Generalitat). from which 1.4 million were received in 2012 alone. In all, in the 2011–2016 period Òmnium could have received more than 20 million euros from the Generalitat (2.9m euros in 2011, 3.2m euros in 2012, 4.5m euros in 2013, 6.6m euros in 2014, 5.6m euros in 2015 and 4.4m euros in 2016).

In 2013 the association announced that it would no longer receive funding from the Catalan government, but the organization does not publish its accounts. In 2016, different local authorities gave grants to Òmnium, basically for local cultural activities, for a value of €144,404.12, out of a total income in 2016 of €4.4 million.

According to the Spanish Civil Guard in 2018, 98% of Òmnium Cultural's budget came from private contributions and it did not receive funding from the Catalan government in relation to the 2017 independence referendum.

In November 2015 Òmnium was condemned by the Audiencia Nacional for the unauthorised use and deficient custody of personal data, after its data had been stolen by a hacker. This led to a €200,000 sanction imposed by the Spanish agency responsible for data protection.

== See also ==
- 2010 Catalan autonomy protest
