= Assemblea Nacional Catalana =

Political movement advocating Catalonian independence

- Formation: 25 May 2011; 15 years ago
- Purpose: Catalan independence
- Region served: Catalonia
- Key people: Jordi Sànchez i Picanyol; Carme Forcadell i Lluís
- Website: assemblea.cat

The Assemblea Nacional Catalana (in English: Catalan National Assembly, ANC by its Catalan acronym) is an organization that seeks the political independence of Catalonia from Spain. It also promotes the independence of other Catalan-speaking regions, which are collectively known as the Catalan Countries (Països Catalans).

Its current president is Jordi Sànchez i Picanyol. Sànchez was imprisoned on 16 October 2017 for his role in pro-independence protests during the days before the Catalan referendum. In January 2015, it claimed more than 80,000 members, of whom 40,132 were full-paying members (fee paying) and 39,946 were signed up as volunteer collaborators. The ANC has 10 regional subdivisions which are represented on the national board as well as professional groups for various private sectors, and 37 foreign branches around the world.

== History ==
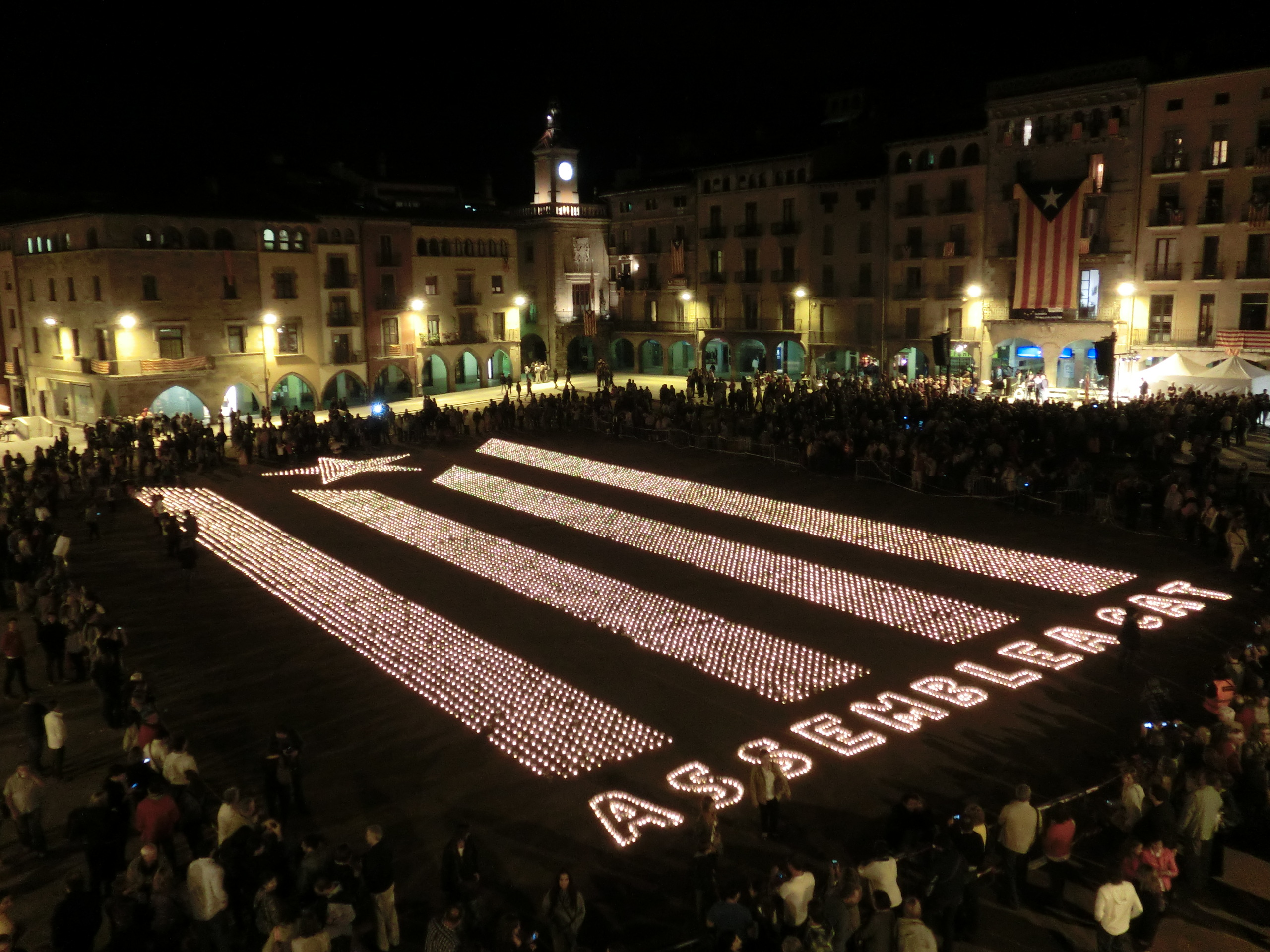
Estelada flag of candle organized by the ANC in the Major square in Vic, 11 October 2012.

The origin of the organization was the National Conference for the Catalan State (Conferència Nacional per l'Estat Propi), held on 30 April 2011 in Barcelona, in which 1,500 people participated. A Permanent Council and the interim secretariat were elected at this conference.

The formal incorporation as a civic association was held on 10 March 2012, at the Palau Sant Jordi in Barcelona. in which the statutes, internal workings, and road map to independence were approved. In April 2012, Carme Forcadell was chosen as president of the ANC, Carles Castellanos was elected vice president, Llorenç Sotorres was elected treasurer, and Jordi Martínez was elected secretary.

On 8 June 2013, the ANC held elections in which Carme Forcadell was re-elected president. Jaume Marfany was elected vice president, replacing Carles Castellanos. Jordi Martínez remained as secretary and Oriol Sallas replaced Llorenç Sotorres as treasurer.

In May 2015, Jordi Sanchez i Picanyol replaced Carme Forcadell as president of the ANC.

== Campaigns and activity ==
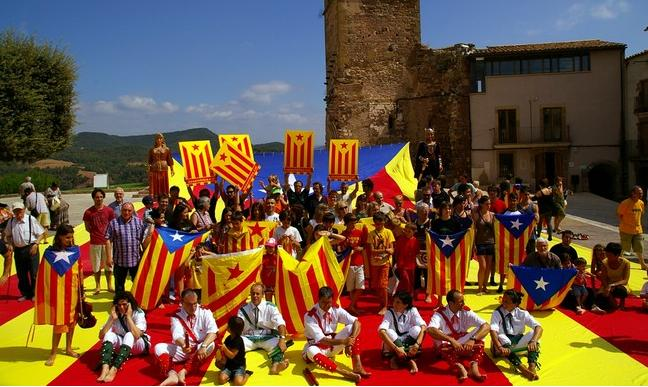
Symbolic event in Artés of deploying a giant estelada

The regional chapters of the ANC periodically organize a series of events in their respective areas with respect to the independence of Catalonia in preparation for the Catalan independence referendum in 2014.

=== 2012 ===
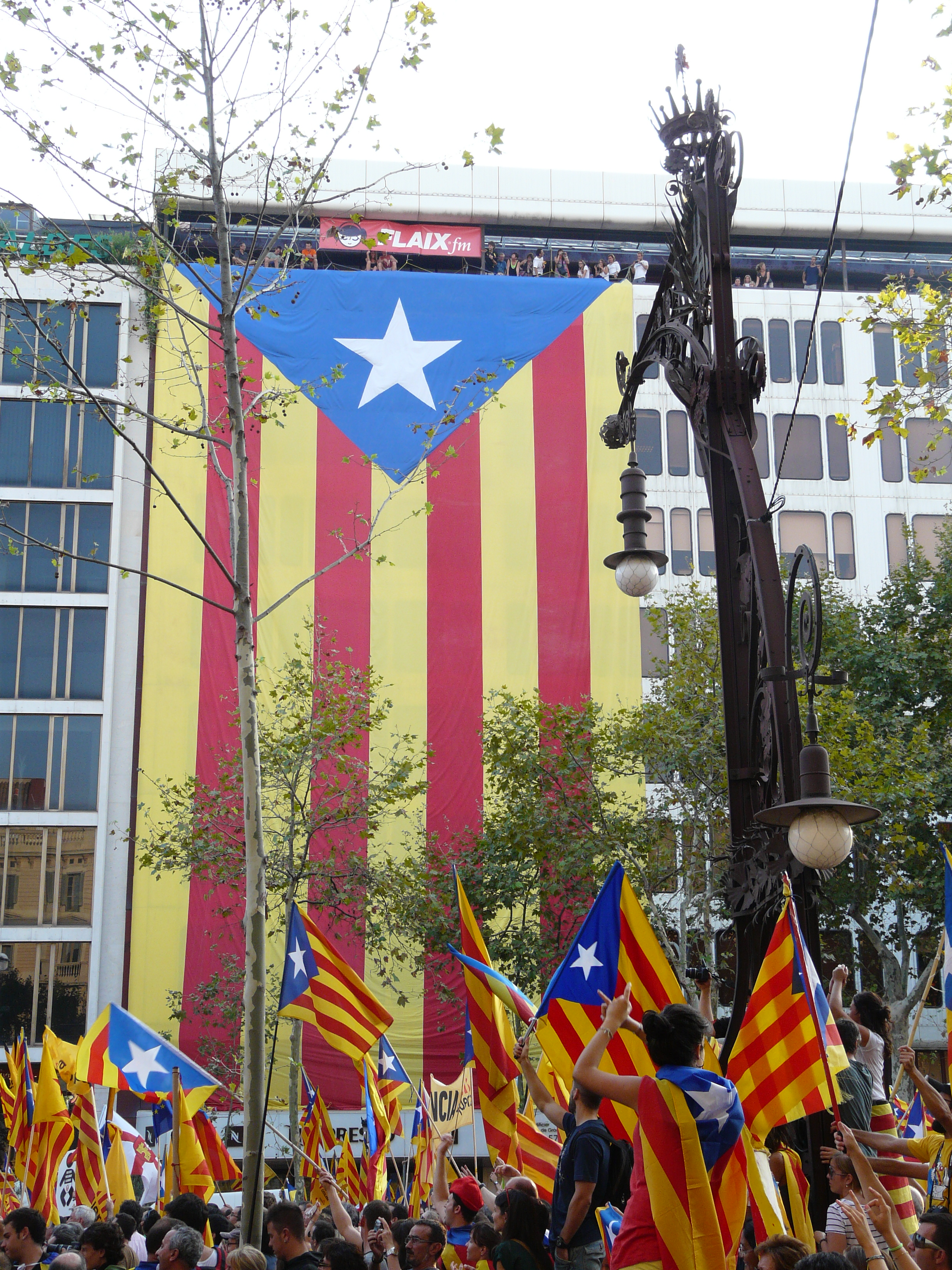
2012 Catalan independence demonstration

At the end of June, 2012, the so-called "March toward Independence" begun in Seu Vella (Lleida). After a series of festive, symbolic, and protest events, this march would culminate on 11 September with a massive march on Barcelona, with the slogan "Catalonia, new state in Europe". It was a historic day for the separatist camp, both for the number of people in attendance as well as the markedly pro-independence tone of the march, never before seen in such a well-attended event (estimates of the crowds range widely, from 600,000 people quoted by some media, statisticians such as Llorenç Badiella from the Autonomous University of Barcelona or the delegation of the Spanish government in Catalonia to 1.5 million according to Catalan public sources such as Barcelona's Municipal Police or Catalonia's Department of the Interior, with a maximum estimate of about 2 million according to the organizers)

Two days after the demonstration, the president of the ANC, Carme Forcadell, and four additional members of the group's board were officially received at the Catalan Government Palace by then president Artur Mas. During the meeting, they suggested to him that he called plebiscitary elections to the Parliament of Catalonia on independence and that he called for a referendum in 2014.

As a result of the demonstration, Mas called a snap election to the Catalan Parliament for 25 November 2012 and made clear in his speech in the inaugural session of the General Policy Debates that he was convinced that the Parliament that came out of the new elections would have as its mission the exercise of the right to self-determination of Catalonia.

=== 2013 ===
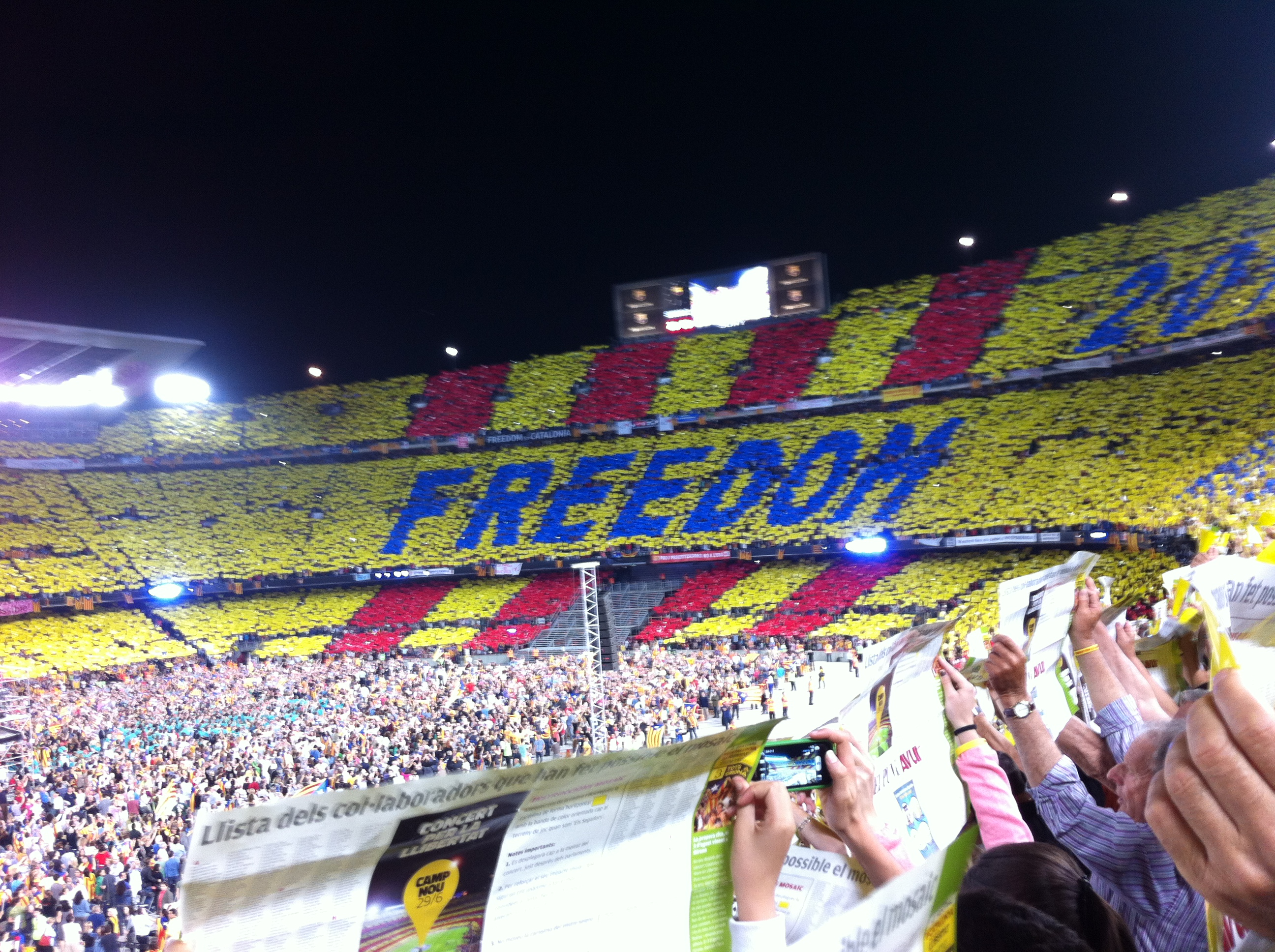
Concert for Freedom at Camp Nou, on 29 June 2013.

At the beginning of 2013, the ANC began a Fiscal Sovereignty campaign so that private citizens, businesses, and local institutions could pay taxes en masse to the Catalan Tax Agency. From May to July, 2013, they organized a crowdfunding campaign at totSuma in order to offer support to all the interested parties.

On 1 June 2013, the ANC began the "Sign a Vote for Independence" campaign, in which, through the right to petition, petitions were collected to ask the Catalan Parliament to exhaust all of the possible paths toward facilitating the celebration of a referendum for self-determination of Catalonia before 31 May 2014, and in the event that that attempt failed that the elected representatives of the people of Catalonia unilaterally declare the independence of Catalonia.

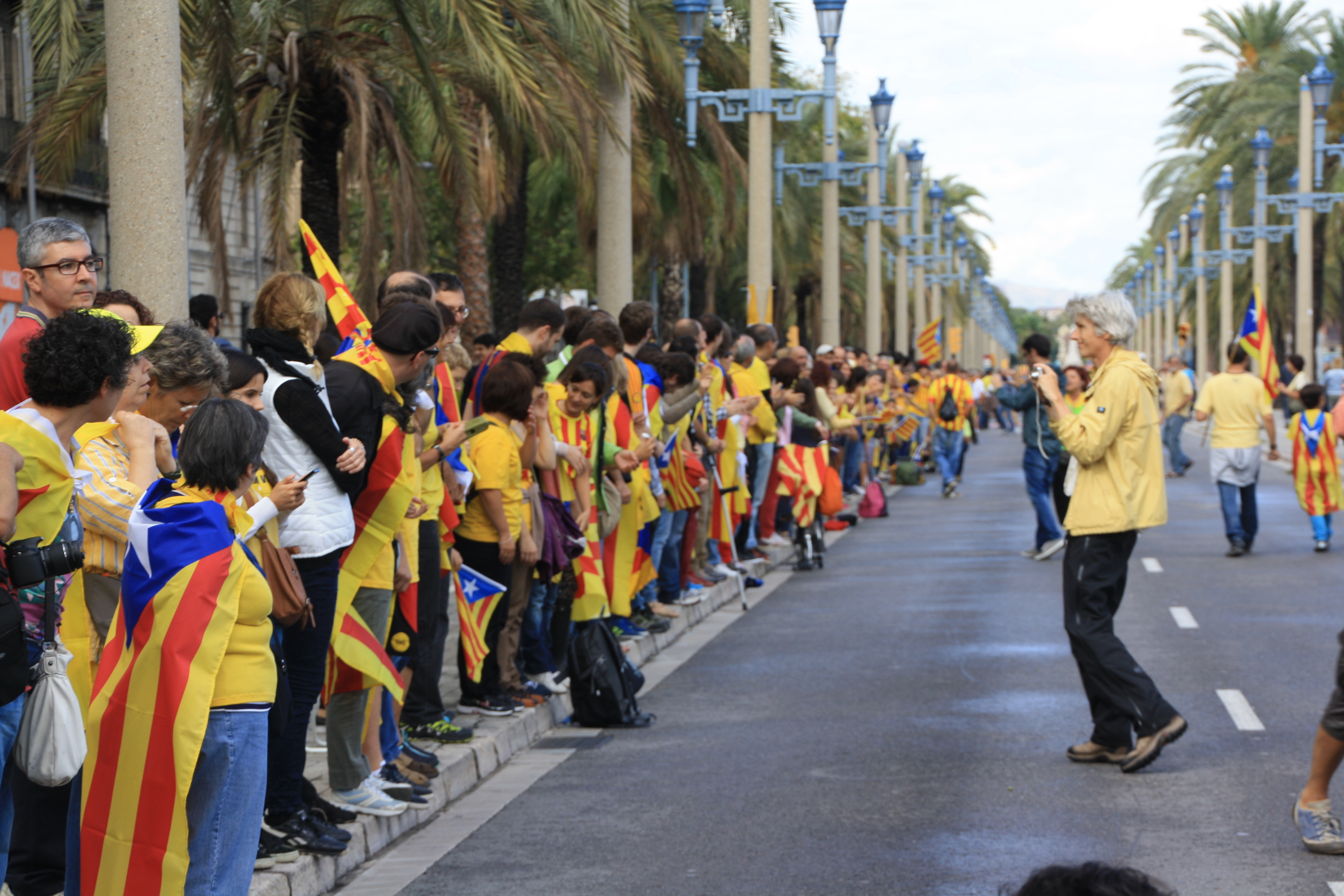
Catalan Way in section 746, Passeig de Colom in Barcelona.

The Catalan National Assembly and Òmnium Cultural organized a concert, the Concert for Freedom, in Camp Nou on 29 June 2013 to show off mass support in favor of independence. Around 90,000 people attended the concert.

The Catalan Assembly also organized a human chain of about 400 km in length, known as the Catalan Way, that was held on the National Day of Catalonia (11 September) following the path of the old Via Augusta from La Jonquera (in the north of Catalonia) to Alcanar (in the south). It was inspired by the Baltic Way, which was organized by Baltic political movements seeking independence from the Soviet Union in 1989 and spanned the three Baltic states of Estonian SSR, Latvian SSR, and Lithuanian SSR. Between 1.6 and 2 million citizens held their hands along these 400 km. After the demonstration, then Catalan President Artur Mas received Mrs. Forcadell at the Government Palace and committed to listen to the will of the people and to organising a consultation on the region's future.

=== 2014 ===
The Assemblea distributed Sí banners during the 2017 Catalan independence referendum.

On 29 May 2014, the ANC, with other associations, presented at El Born, the campaign El País que Volem (The Country We Want), an open participative process for citizens whose goal is to collect their proposals about how should Catalonia be when it becomes an independent state.

The Catalan Assembly and Òmnium Cultural organized the 2014 edition of the demonstration of the Catalan national day in Barcelona. This demonstration formed a huge Catalan flag all along 11 kilometers between Gran Via de les Corts Catalanes and Diagonal avenue forming a big V for voluntat (will), as well as voting and victory. According to police there were 1.8 million and according to organizations 2.5 million people to demand for a poll on 9 November 2014.

On 14 September the Catalan Assembly gave to the parliament president, Núria de Gispert, nearly 750,000 signatures collected in the campaign "Sign a vote for independence", to ask Catalan government to declare independence if the 9 November poll could not be held.

=== 2023 ===
Of note was the abstention in Catalonia during the 2023 Spanish general election; at 34.58%, it was the highest of all the Autonomous Communities and the highest recorded there since 2011. As the majority Catalan pro-independence organization, the ANC promoted abstention as a form of protest, which was joined by other entities and organizations. Shortly thereafter, the ANC dissociated itself from the call for mass abstention of the pro-independence movement. In part due to a campaign led by the ANC encouraging pro-Catalan independence voters to boycott the election, pro-independence parties lost 46% of the votes they won in the previous election, materializing in the loss of 9 seats and the exit from the Congress of the anti-capitalists of the Popular Unity Candidacy.

== Finances ==
The budget for 2015 was slightly over 5 million euros, from which 3.4 million were dedicated to various advertising campaigns. Following the detection of 1.5 million euro in unsubstantiated income, in 2015 the ANC reached a deal with the tax authorities to pay 172,000 euros in pending VAT plus a 44,000 euros tax penalty. In a separate piece, in November 2015 the ANC was found responsible of unauthorized use and deficient custody of personal data for its activities, resulting in a 240,000 euros sanction imposed by the Spanish agency responsible for data protection.

== See also ==
- Catalan Republic
- Catalan Countries
- Catalan nationalism
- History of Catalonia
- Catalan language
- Anna Arqué i Solsona
- Carles Castellanos i Llorenç
