= Jordi Salvador =

Spanish teacher, trade unionist and politician

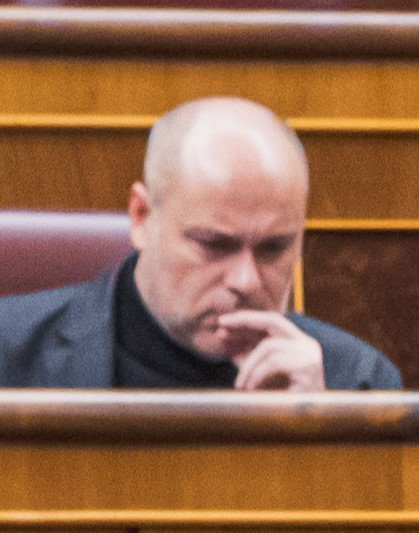

Member of the Congress of Deputies of Spain
- Incumbent
- Assumed office 12 January 2016
- Constituency: Tarragona

Personal details
- Born: Jordi Salvador i Duch; 23 July 1964 (age 62) Barcelona, Spain
- Citizenship: Spanish
- Party: Republican Left of Catalonia
- Other political affiliations: Republican Left of Catalonia–Sovereigntists
- Education: Rovira i Virgili University
- Occupation: Teacher
- Website: Archived 2019-12-28 at the Wayback Machine

Jordi Salvador i Duch (born 23 July 1964) is a Spanish teacher, trade unionist and politician. He also is a member of the Congress of Deputies of Spain.

== Early life ==
Salvador was born on 23 July 1964 in Barcelona, (Note: Other sources give Salvador's place of birth as Tarragona.) Catalonia. His maternal grandparents were originally from Conca de Barberà but moved to Barcelona in the early part of the 20th century for economic reasons. In 1971, aged six, Salvador and his parents moved to the Torreforta suburb of Tarragona.

Salvador has a bachelor's degree in geography and history and a doctorate in social and cultural anthropology from the Rovira i Virgili University (URV). His 2005 doctoral thesis was titled Futbol Metàfora de una Guerra Freda: Un Estudi Antropològic del Barça. He also has diplomas from the University of Barcelona (UB) to teach social sciences and physics at Educación General Básica (EGB) level.

== Career ==
Salvador was a teacher at various institutions from 1987 to 2015. A member of Federación de Trabajadores de Enseñanza (FETE), he was general-secretary of the Tarragona branch of the Unión General de Trabajadores from 2008 to 2015. He is a member of Òmnium Cultural and Entre Pobles.

Salvador contested the 2015 general election as an independent Republican Left of Catalonia–Catalonia Yes (ERC–CatSí) electoral alliance candidate in the Province of Tarragona and was elected to the Congress of Deputies. He was re-elected at the 2016, April 2019 and November 2019 general elections. In February 2020 he was elected general-secretary of the Tarragona regional branch of the Republican Left of Catalonia.

== Electoral history ==
Electoral history of Jordi Salvador
Election	Constituency	Party	Alliance	No.	Result
2015 general	Province of Tarragona	Independent	Republican Left of Catalonia–Catalonia Yes	1	Elected
2016 general	Province of Tarragona	Independent	Republican Left of Catalonia–Catalonia Yes	1	Elected
2019 April general	Province of Tarragona	Republican Left of Catalonia	Republican Left of Catalonia–Sovereigntists	1	Elected
2019 November general	Province of Tarragona	Republican Left of Catalonia	Republican Left of Catalonia–Sovereigntists	1	Elected
