= 2015 Spanish general election =

- 20 December 2015

All 350 seats in the Congress of Deputies and 208 (of 266) seats in the Senate 176 seats needed for a majority in the Congress of Deputies
- Opinion polls
- Registered: 36,511,848 ▲2.0%
- Turnout: 25,438,532 (69.7%) ▲0.8 pp
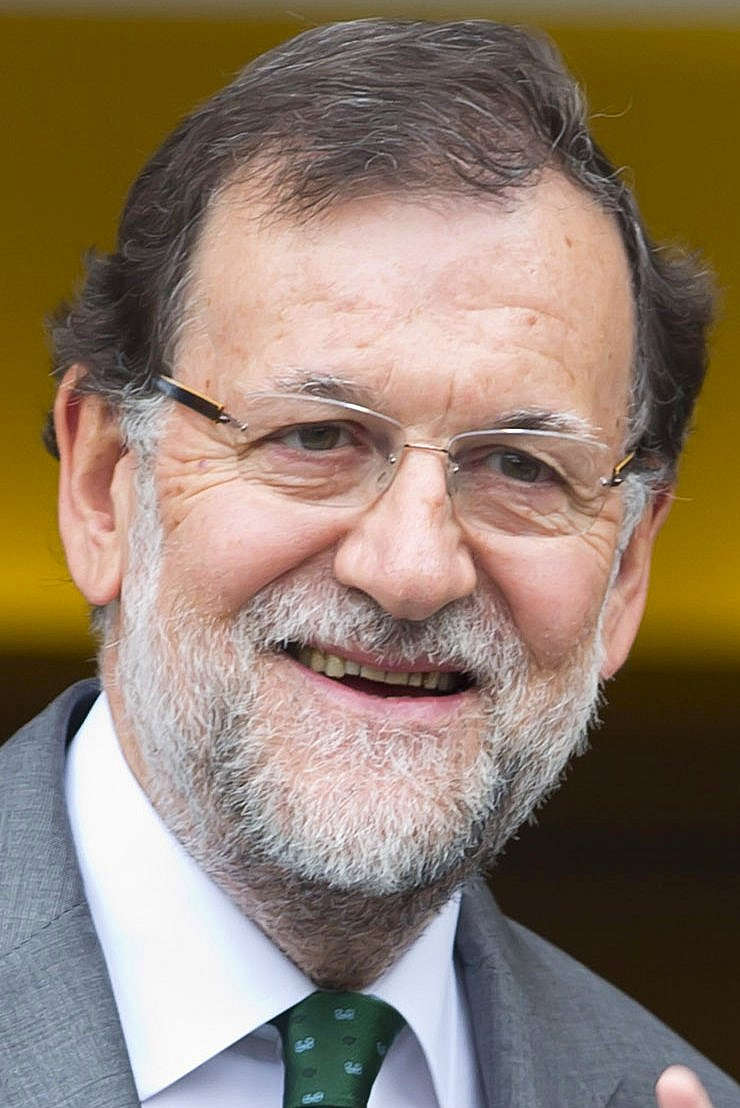

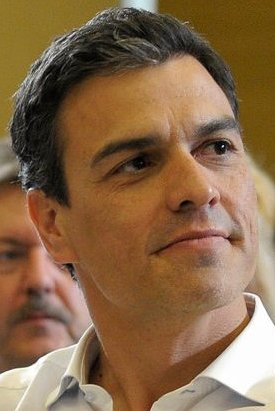

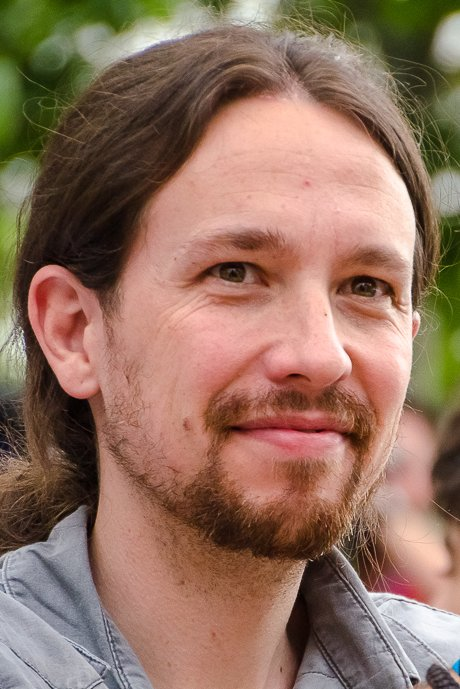

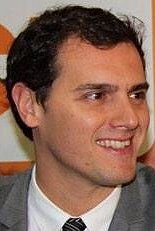

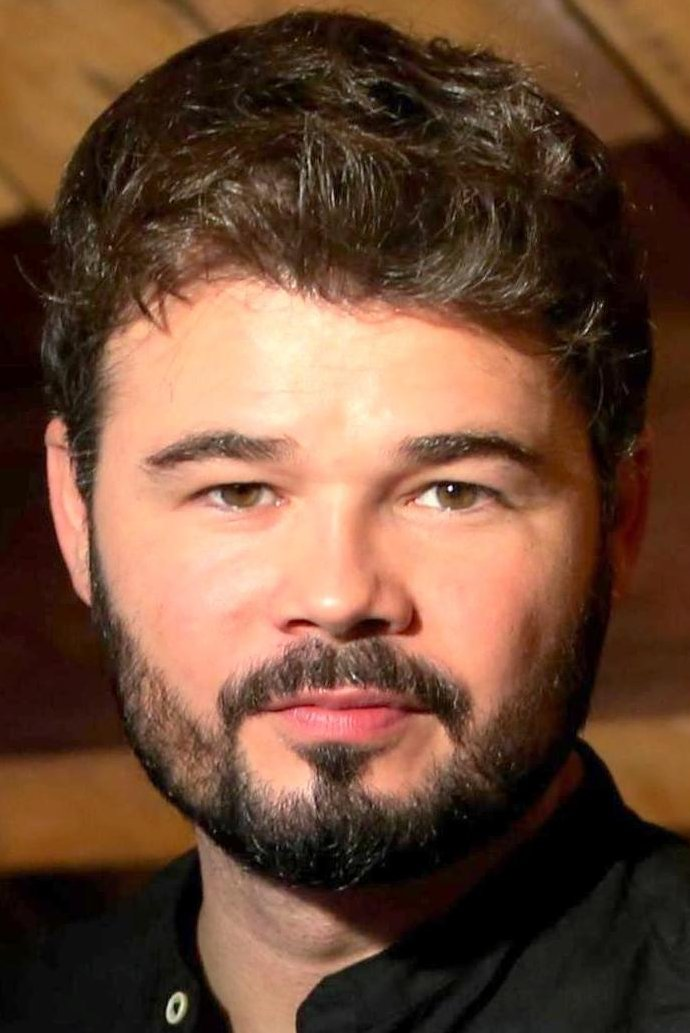

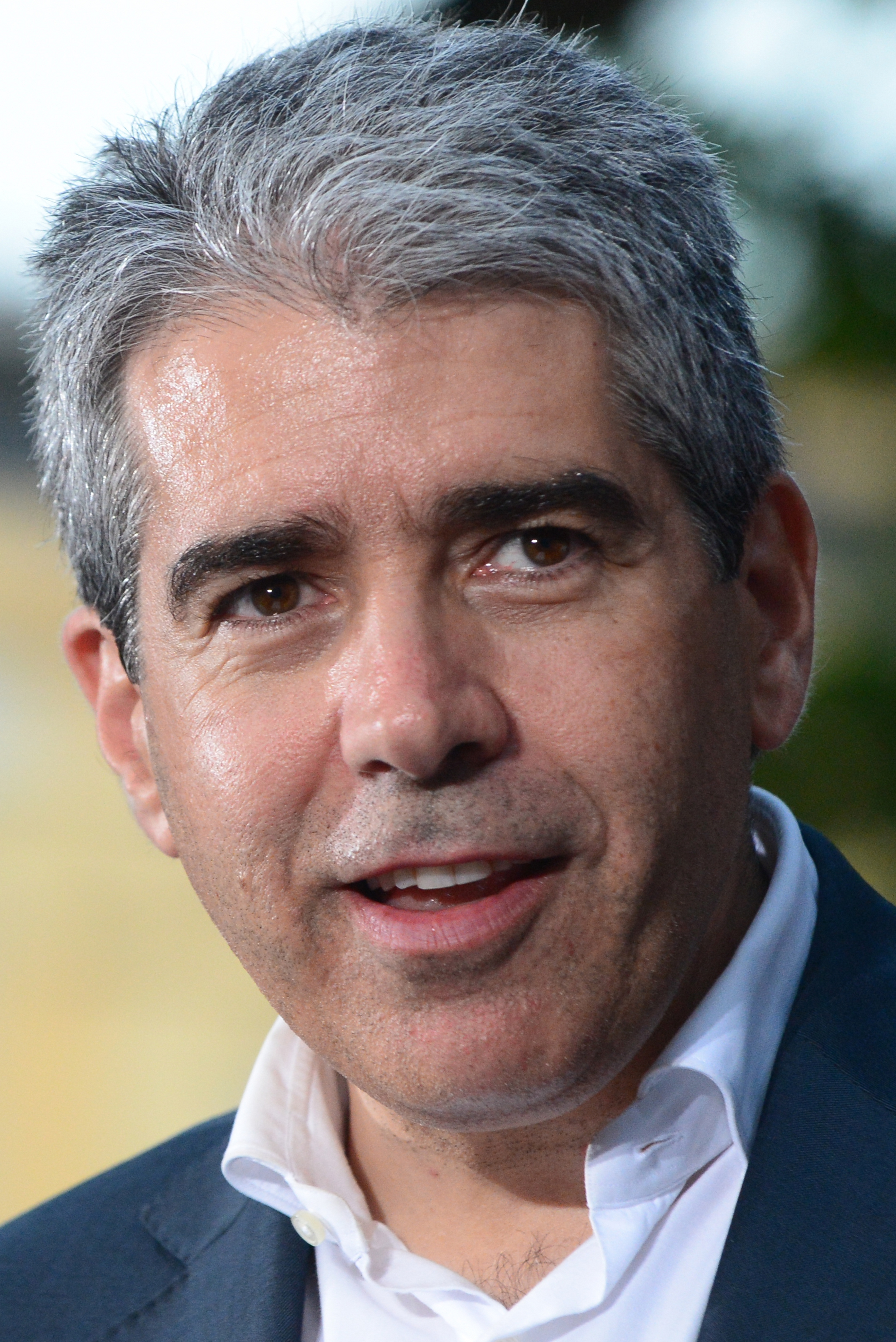
	First party	Second party	Third party
Leader	Mariano Rajoy	Pedro Sánchez	Pablo Iglesias
Party	PP	PSOE	Podemos (Note: Total figures include results for En Comú Podem, És el moment and En Marea.)
Leader since	2 September 2003	26 July 2014	15 November 2014
Leader's seat	Madrid	Madrid	Madrid
Last election	187 seats, 45.0% (Note: Results for PP (44.6%, 186 deputies) and FAC (0.4%, 1 deputy) in the 2011 Congress election.)	110 seats, 28.8%	Did not contest
Seats won	123	90	69
Seat change	▼64	▼20	▲65 (Note: ICV–EUiA (3 deputies and 1 senator), which contested the 2011 election within the IU–LV and Entesa alliances, joined the En Comú Podem alliance ahead of the 2015 election. Compromís (1 deputy and 0 senators) joined the És el moment alliance.)
Popular vote	7,236,965	5,545,315	5,212,711
Percentage	28.7%	22.0%	20.7%
Swing	▼16.3 pp	▼6.8 pp	New party
	Fourth party	Fifth party	Sixth party
Leader	Albert Rivera	Gabriel Rufián	Francesc Homs
Party	C's	ERC–CatSí	DiL
Leader since	9 July 2006	7 November 2015	14 November 2015
Leader's seat	Madrid	Barcelona	Barcelona
Last election	Did not contest	3 seats, 1.1%	16 seats, 4.2% (Note: Results for CiU in the 2015 election.)
Seats won	40	9	8
Seat change	▲40	▲6	▼8
Popular vote	3,514,528	604,285	567,253
Percentage	13.9%	2.4%	2.2%
Swing	New party	▲1.3 pp	▼2.0 pp
Prime Minister before election
Mariano Rajoy
PP
Prime Minister after election
No government formed
and fresh election called.
Mariano Rajoy remains
acting Prime Minister

A general election was held in Spain on 20 December 2015 to elect the members of the 11th Cortes Generales under the Spanish Constitution of 1978. All 350 seats in the Congress of Deputies were up for election, as well as 208 of 266 seats in the Senate. At exactly four years and one month since the previous one, this remains the longest timespan between two general elections since the Spanish transition to democracy, and the only time in the country's history that a general election has been held on the latest possible date allowed by law.

Immediately after assuming office following the 2011 election, the new government under Prime Minister Mariano Rajoy adopted a harsh austerity agenda including social spending cuts, tax hikes and a labour market reform to address the Great Recession in Spain (amid soaring unemployment, public deficit and bond yields), as well as the request of a bank bailout through the European Stability Mechanism, which were met with an anti-austerity movement and two general strikes. A number of corruption scandals affecting the ruling People's Party (PP)—most notably, the Bárcenas and Púnica affairs, and the ongoing judicial probes into the Gürtel affair—further weakened the government's position and increased social distrust in traditional parties. During this period, the Monarchy underwent a reputation crisis over King Juan Carlos's elephant-hunting trips and the Nóos affair involving Infanta Cristina and her spouse, leading to the King's abdication in favour of his son, who acceded to the throne as Felipe VI.

Public discontent with the political system showed up in the results of the 2014 European Parliament election in Spain—which saw the emergence of anti-austerity Podemos (under political commentator Pablo Iglesias) and the Albert Rivera-led liberal Citizens (C's), curtailing expectations for left-wing United Left (IU) and centrist Union, Progress and Democracy (UPyD)—while the 2015 local and regional elections resulted in a wipeout of most of the PP's territorial power in favour of left-wing administrations. The resignation of Alfredo Pérez Rubalcaba as leader of the opposition Spanish Socialist Workers' Party (PSOE) triggered a 2014 leadership contest which was won by Pedro Sánchez. In Catalonia, disgruntlement with the ruling PP served as catalyst for a pro-independence push being supported by the regional authorities under Convergence and Union (CiU), which held a non-binding self-determination referendum in 2014 defying orders from the Spanish Constitutional Court. The outcome of the 2015 Catalan election briefly boosted C's polling numbers before dwindling to a Podemos's comeback during the general election campaign.

The election saw the PP, PSOE and IU scoring historical lows, with Rajoy's party seeing the largest loss of support for a sitting Spanish government since 1982. Podemos and C's won a combined 109 seats and over eight million votes, mostly at the cost of the main traditional parties, the IU-led Popular Unity platform, UPyD and peripheral nationalists: aside of a major breakthrough by Republican Left of Catalonia and CiU's breakup after 37 years of existence, support for the abertzale left EH Bildu fell sharply, while the Basque Nationalist Party stagnated. With the most-voted party securing just 123 seats and a third party winning an unprecedented 69 seats—the previous record being 23 in 1979—the result marked the transition from an imperfect two-party system to a fully-fledged multi-party system. After months of inconclusive negotiations, neither PP or PSOE were able to garner enough votes to secure a majority, leading to a fresh election in 2016.

== Background ==
Running on a platform promising sweeping reforms to tackle the Great Recession in Spain, the People's Party (PP) under Mariano Rajoy won the 2011 general election in a landslide. Support for the ruling Spanish Socialist Workers' Party (PSOE) collapsed amid public anger over the economy's handling by the outgoing prime minister, José Luis Rodríguez Zapatero. A subsequent PSOE leadership contest saw former deputy prime minister and 2011 candidate Alfredo Pérez Rubalcaba narrowly defeat former defence minister Carme Chacón.

Throughout 2012 and 2013, Rajoy's first government adopted a strict austerity agenda to reduce public deficit and soaring unemployment, including social spending cuts and tax hikes, a labour market reform lowering severance payments, and austere General State Budgets. The nationalization of Bankia after its May 2012 crash heightened fears that Spain could become a new focus of the European debt crisis, while liquidity shortages forced several regions—Valencia, Murcia and Catalonia—to request state financial assistance. Rising bond yields pushed Rajoy to request a bank bailout from the European Stability Mechanism in June 2012, whose terms saw reforms in taxation (including the energy sector, further hikes on VAT and environmental taxes, or the abolition of home purchase deductions), spending cuts (such as in unemployment benefits, civil servants' bonuses, or long-term care), a public administration overhaul (with reductions of local councillors and public companies), and privatizations (affecting rail, air and maritine transport services). Additional measures included health copayments and court fees, major cuts into education and healthcare spending, reductions in coal industry subsidies, a temporary tax amnesty, the creation of a bad bank (Sareb), and the decoupling of pension increases from the CPI. Amid accusations of insensitivity, plummeting ratings, and criticism for breaking election pledges, Rajoy defended his policies as necessary to stabilize the economy, while justifying his U-turns on the situation he inherited. His government also secured a three-year extension to meet EU deficit targets. Spain officially exited recession in Q3 2013, and the bank bailout programme ended in January 2014.

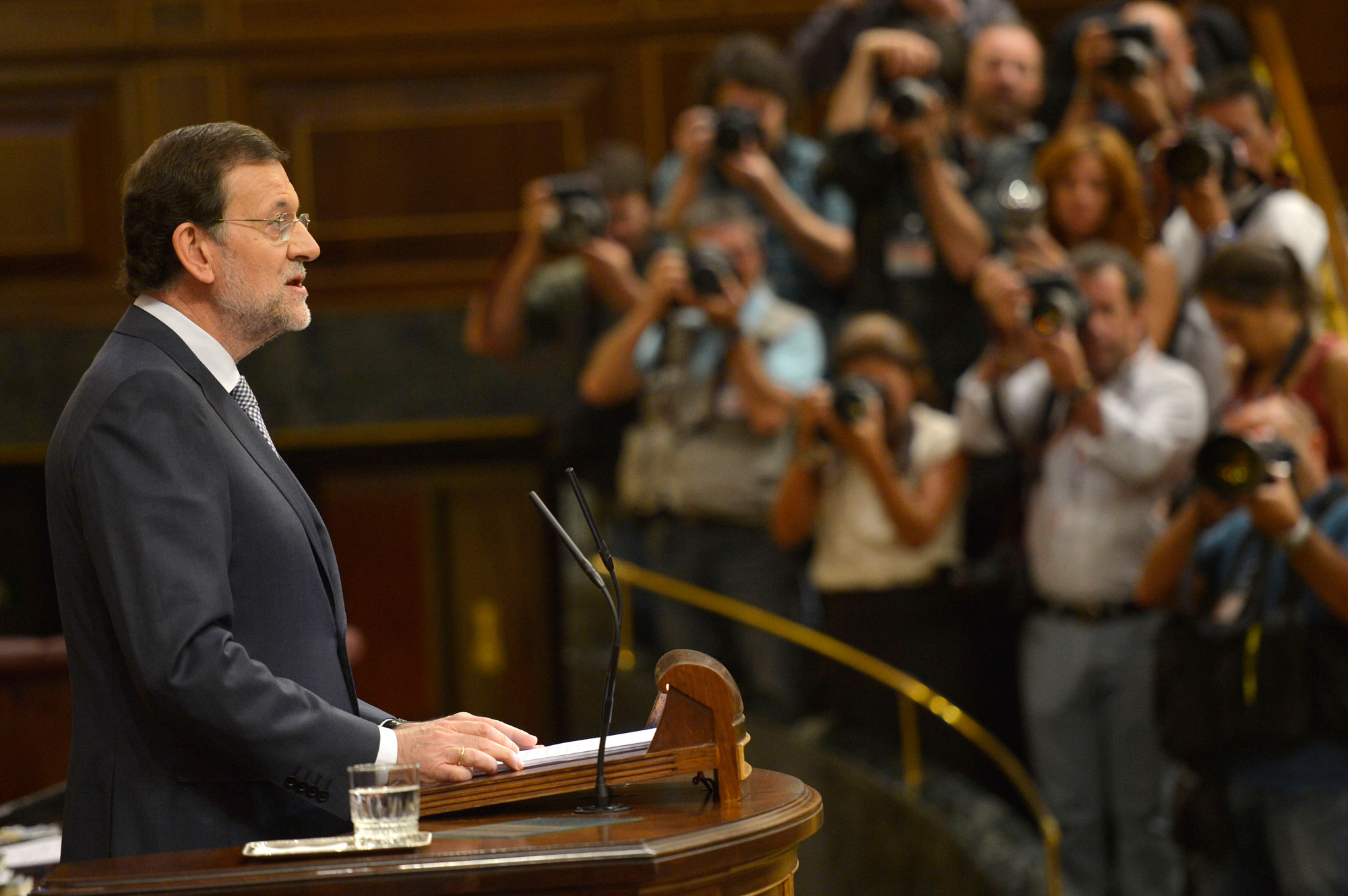
The austerity measures adopted by the government of Prime Minister Mariano Rajoy (pictured on 11 July 2012) were frequently described as "harsh" and "brutal", and helped fuel an anti-austerity movement in Spain.

Domestically, the government enforced a new Education Law (the LOMCE or so-called Wert Law), widely criticized as "ideologically driven", promoting school segregation and giving greater prominence to Spanish over regional languages. Another bill, the Citizen Security Law—dubbed the "Gag Law" by critics—was seen as restricting civil and political rights, especially freedom of assembly and expression, by imposing stricter rules and heavy fines on street protesters. An attempt to replace the existing abortion law with a much stricter regulation (limiting it to cases of rape or serious pregnancy complications) was ultimately abandoned after public outrage, leading to the resignation of the justice minister, Alberto Ruiz-Gallardón. The government also faced criticism over the 2013 Angrois derailment, the 2014 Ceuta incident (in which 15 migrants drowned as a result of police action), and an Ebola crisis in October 2014 (widely seen as poorly managed).

During this period, scandals and corruption allegations affected the ruling PP and various other parties and institutions: those involving former CEOE chair Gerardo Díaz Ferrán; the PP's Bárcenas affair (a slush fund financed through a parallel bookkeeping system for illegal donations); investigations into illegal party funding affecting both the PP and Democratic Convergence of Catalonia (CDC); several regional and local kickback-for-contract schemes (Pokémon, "three-percent", Púnica, and Gürtel, the latter forcing Ana Mato's resignation as health minister); misuse of layoff funds by the PSOE-led Andalusian government (the ERE affair, which prompted José Antonio Griñán's replacement by Susana Díaz as regional president); illicit dealings by former Catalan premier Jordi Pujol and his family; misuse of corporate credit cards affecting former Caja Madrid directors; or an investigation into a luxury penthouse owned by the Madrilenian president, Ignacio González. Scandals extended to the Royal Household with the Nóos affair (affecting the Dukes of Palma, Iñaki Urdangarín and Cristina de Borbón), and King Juan Carlos's controversial elephant-hunting trip to Botswana in 2012. The decline in the King's popularity, together with health issues, led to his abdication in June 2014 in favour of his son, Felipe VI. The scale of scandals during this period was compared by media to Italy's Tangentopoli in the 1990s.

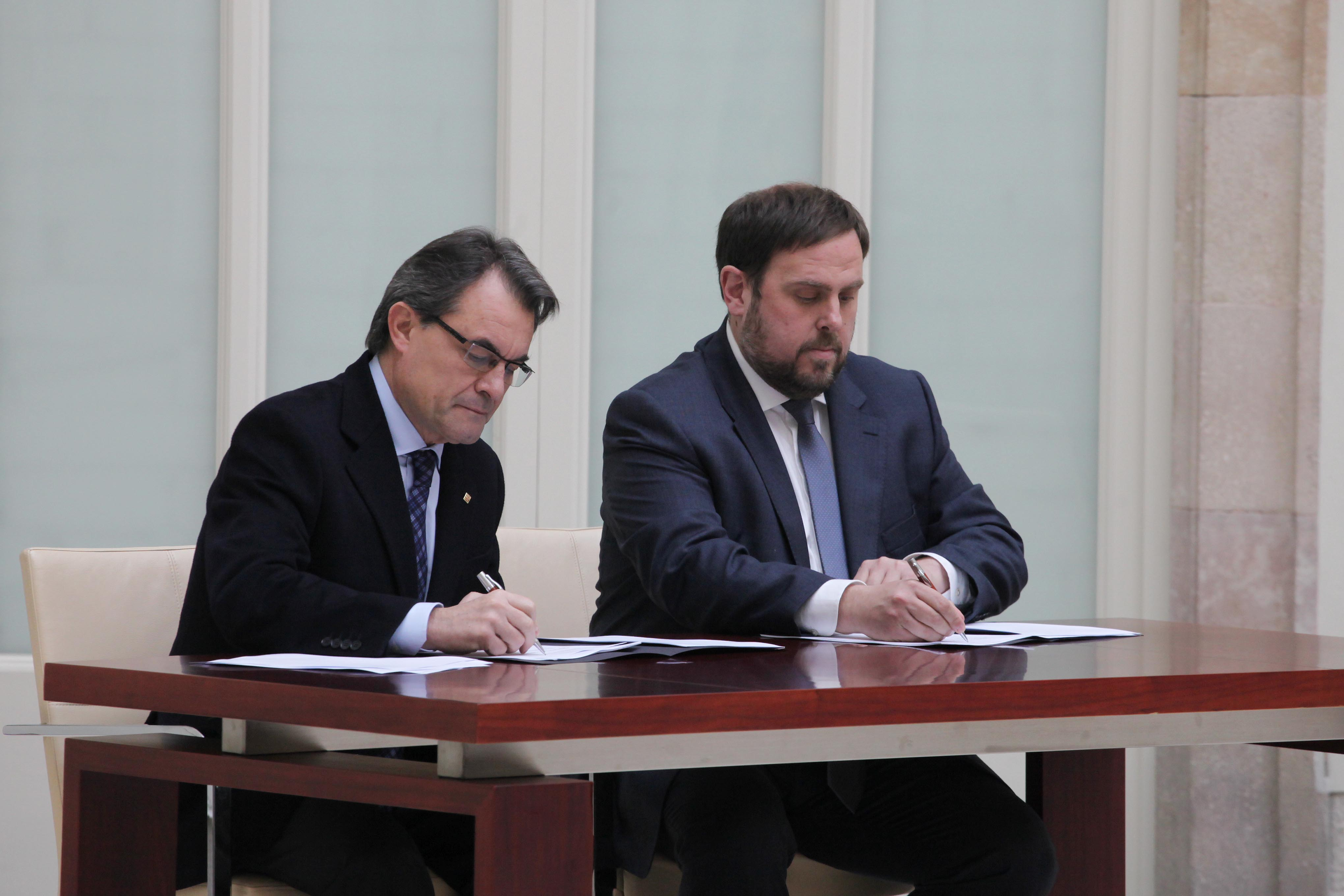
Following the 2012 Catalan election, regional president Artur Mas and ERC leader Oriol Junqueras reached a confidence and supply accord that envisaged a roadmap to independence.

Growing discontent with the Spanish government in Catalonia, along with the Constitutional Court's curtailment of the regional Statute of Autonomy, materialized in a massive pro-independence demonstration on 11 September 2012. Rajoy's refusal to a proposed fiscal pact from regional president Artur Mas pushed Convergence and Union (CiU) towards supporting independence, with Mas calling a snap election for November. After failing to capitalize on rising independence support, CiU relied on the Republican Left of Catalonia (ERC) in exchange for a roadmap to secession. The newly-elected parliament approved a sovereignty declaration and authorized a non-binding self-determination referendum in 2014, both of which were struck down by the Constitutional Court. This Catalan sovereignist "process" (procés) was accompanied by large-scale mobilization, especially during the National Day of Catalonia gatherings of 2013, 2014 and 2015, while sewing divisions between the Socialists' Party of Catalonia and the PSOE. Growing tensions between CiU's constituent parties—CDC and Democratic Union of Catalonia—eventually led to the alliance's breakup in June 2015 after 37 years.

Austerity policies were widely blamed for increasing inequality and worsening social and economic rights, while a wave of evictions intensified social tensions. Discontent against Rajoy's government first became clear in the 2012 Andalusian election, and was followed by strong social mobilization: the Indignados Movement-organized mass protests and demonstrations; two general strikes in March and November 2012; the 2012 Asturian miners' strike; occupations and anti-eviction actions by the Mortgage Victims Platform; the "Surround" and "Besiege Congress" protests; or the so-called "citizen tides" and "dignity march" demonstrations. Meanwhile, the opposition PSOE—still weakened by internal strife and collective memory of its economic management—failed to capitalize on the unrest, allowing new parties such as Podemos (founded by political commentator Pablo Iglesias) to channel anti-establishment sentiment and disrupt the traditional two-party system in the 2014 European Parliament election. PSOE's poor results prompted Rubalcaba's resignation and the election of a dark horse candidate, Pedro Sánchez, as new leader. The snap 2015 Andalusian election in March saw strong results for both Podemos and the liberal and anti-Catalan independence Citizens (C's) led by Albert Rivera, their national rise confirmed in the May 2015 local and regional elections, which saw the PP being swept out from power in most regions and major cities.

Going into the general election, Rajoy promised to roll back some austerity measures (including tax cuts, pay raises for public workers, and increased social spending) owing to an improving economic outlook, with a softer 2016 budget being passed in October 2015. Concurrently, Catalonia held a new regional election in September 2015, which resulted in a joint CDC–ERC list (Together for Yes) relying on support from the pro-independence Popular Unity Candidacy; the three parties then approved the start of an 18-month independence process. A strong result by C's turned opinion polling into a three-way race with the PP and PSOE right before the election call.

== Overview ==
Under the 1978 Constitution, the Spanish Cortes Generales were conceived as an imperfect bicameral system. The Congress of Deputies held greater legislative power than the Senate, having the ability to grant or withdraw confidence from a prime minister and to override Senate vetoes by an absolute majority. Nonetheless, the Senate retained a limited number of specific functions—such as ratifying international treaties, authorizing cooperation agreements between autonomous communities, enforcing direct rule, regulating interterritorial compensation funds, and taking part in constitutional amendments and in the appointment of members to the Constitutional Court and the General Council of the Judiciary—which were not subject to override by Congress.

=== Date ===
The term of each chamber of the Cortes Generales—the Congress and the Senate—expired four years from the date of their previous election, unless they were dissolved earlier. The election decree was required to be issued no later than 25 days before the scheduled expiration date of parliament and published on the following day in the Official State Gazette (BOE), with election day taking place 54 days after the decree's publication. The previous election was held on 20 November 2011, which meant that the chambers' terms would have expired on 20 November 2015. The election decree was required to be published in the BOE no later than 27 October 2015, setting the latest possible date for election day on 20 December 2015.

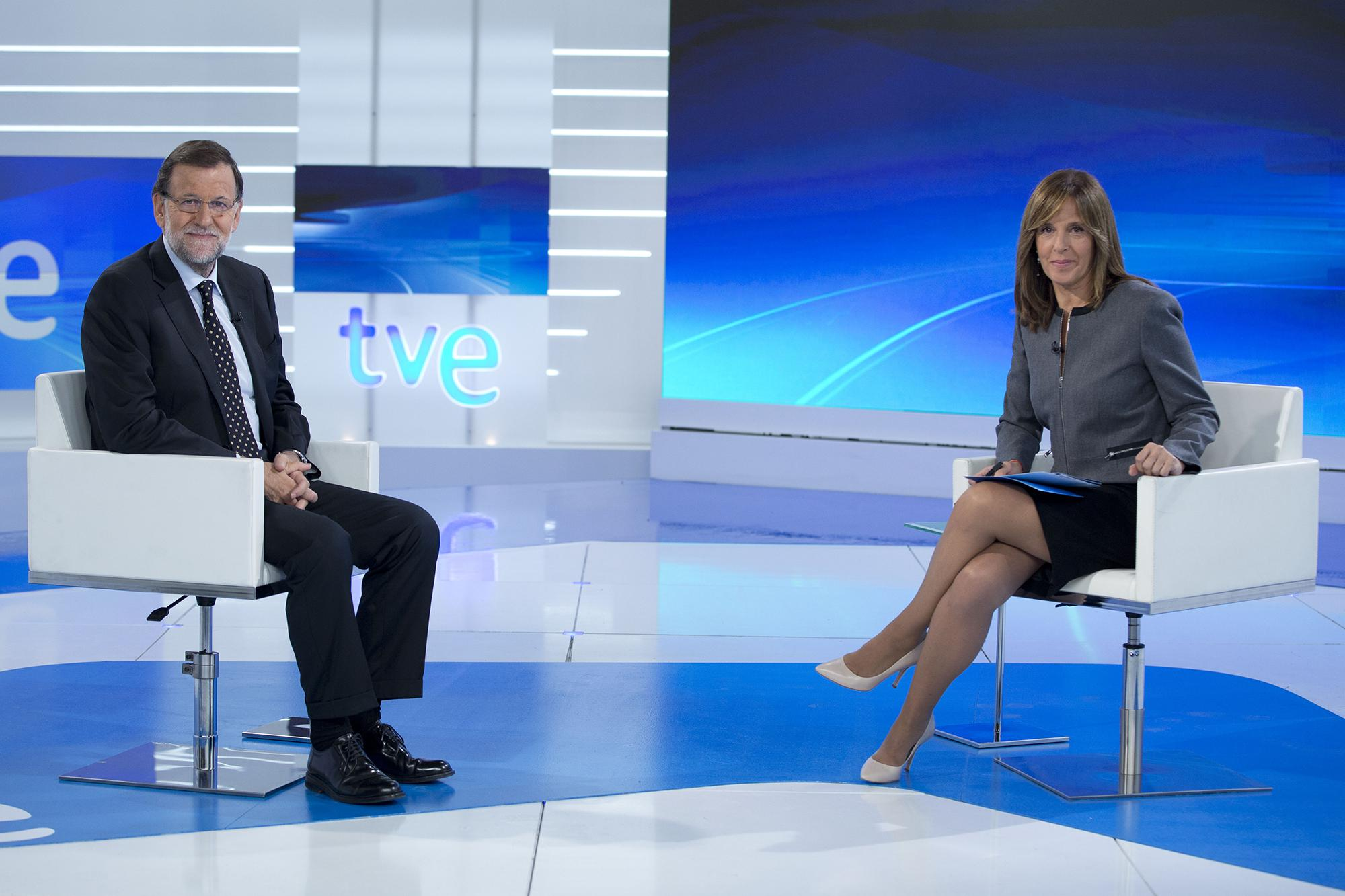
During an interview on 1 October 2015, Prime Minister Mariano Rajoy announced election day for 20 December.

The prime minister had the prerogative to propose the monarch to dissolve both chambers at any given time—either jointly or separately—and call a snap election, provided that no motion of no confidence was in process, no state of emergency was in force and that dissolution did not occur before one year after a previous one. Additionally, both chambers were to be dissolved and a new election called if an investiture process failed to elect a prime minister within a two-month period from the first ballot. Barring this exception, there was no constitutional requirement for simultaneous elections to the Congress and the Senate. Still, as of 2026, there has been no precedent of separate elections taking place under the 1978 Constitution.

In May 2014, ABC disclosed that Rajoy's government was considering whether a general election could be upheld until early 2016, based on an ambiguous legal interpretation on the parliament's expiration date. In September 2014, Vozpópuli and El Plural further inquired on the possibility that the PP cabinet would be planning to delay a new election until February 2016, hoping for a better economic outlook. Público later revealed legal reports commissioned by the government establishing that the deadline for dissolution was 26 October 2015, with an election being held no later than 20 December. After the 2015 local and regional elections, 22 or 29 November were suggested as possible dates, but Rajoy's intention to approve the 2016 budget delayed the latest possible dates to either 13 or 20 December. During an interview in Antena 3 on 1 October, Rajoy confirmed election for 20 December. Being held four years and one month after the previous election, this was the longest time-span between two general elections since the Spanish transition to democracy.

The Cortes Generales were officially dissolved on 27 October 2015 with the publication of the corresponding decree in the BOE, setting election day for 20 December and scheduling for both chambers to reconvene on 13 January 2016.

=== Electoral system ===
Voting for each chamber of the Cortes Generales was based on universal suffrage, comprising all Spanish nationals over 18 years of age with full political rights, provided that they had not been deprived of the right to vote by a final sentence, nor were legally incapacitated. Additionally, non-resident citizens were required to apply for voting, a system known as "begged" voting (Spanish: Voto rogado).

The Congress of Deputies had a minimum of 300 and a maximum of 400 seats, with electoral provisions fixing its size at 350. Of these, 348 were elected in 50 multi-member constituencies corresponding to the provinces of Spain—each of which was assigned an initial minimum of two seats and the remaining 248 distributed in proportion to population—using the D'Hondt method and closed-list proportional voting, with a three percent-threshold of valid votes (including blank ballots) in each constituency. The remaining two seats were allocated to Ceuta and Melilla as single-member districts elected by plurality voting. The use of this electoral method resulted in a higher effective threshold depending on district magnitude and vote distribution.

As a result of the aforementioned allocation, each Congress multi-member constituency was entitled the following seats:

Seats	Constituencies
36	Madrid
31	Barcelona
15	Valencia^{(−1)}
12	Alicante, Seville
11	Málaga^{(+1)}
10	Murcia
9	Cádiz^{(+1)}
8	A Coruña, Asturias, Balearic Islands, Biscay, Las Palmas
7	Granada, Pontevedra, Santa Cruz de Tenerife, Zaragoza
6	Almería, Badajoz, Córdoba, Gipuzkoa, Girona, Tarragona, Toledo
5	Cantabria, Castellón, Ciudad Real, Huelva, Jaén^{(−1)}, León, Navarre, Valladolid
4	Álava, Albacete, Burgos, Cáceres, La Rioja, Lleida, Lugo, Ourense, Salamanca
3	Ávila, Cuenca, Guadalajara, Huesca, Palencia, Segovia, Teruel, Zamora
2	Soria

208 Senate seats were elected using open-list (Note: Parties could group candidates into lists, although each candidate was treated separately for the purpose of the voting procedure.) partial block voting: voters in constituencies electing four seats could choose up to three candidates; in those with two or three seats, up to two; and in single-member districts, one. Each of the 47 peninsular provinces was allocated four seats, while in insular provinces—such as the Balearic and Canary Islands—the districts were the islands themselves, with the larger ones (Mallorca, Gran Canaria and Tenerife) being allocated three seats each, and the smaller ones (Menorca, Ibiza–Formentera, Fuerteventura, La Gomera, El Hierro, Lanzarote and La Palma) one each. Ceuta and Melilla elected two seats each. Additionally, autonomous communities could appoint at least one senator each and were entitled to one additional seat per million inhabitants.

The law did not provide for by-elections to fill vacant seats; instead, any vacancies arising after the proclamation of candidates and during the legislative term were filled by the next candidates on the party lists or, when required, by designated substitutes.

=== Outgoing parliament ===
The tables below show the composition of the parliamentary groups in both chambers at the time of dissolution.

Parliamentary composition in October 2015
Congress of Deputies (Note: 1 UPyD seat was vacant as a result of Irene Lozano's resignation to join the PSOE on 16 October 2015.)
Groups	Parties	Deputies	
Groups	Parties	Seats	Total
People's Parliamentary Group in the Congress	PP	185	185
Socialist Parliamentary Group	PSOE	96	110
Socialist Parliamentary Group	PSC	14	110
Catalan Parliamentary Group (Convergence and Union)	CDC	9	16
Catalan Parliamentary Group (Convergence and Union)	UDC	7	16
IU, ICV–EUiA, CHA: Plural Left's; Parliamentary Group	IU	8	11
IU, ICV–EUiA, CHA: Plural Left's; Parliamentary Group	ICV	2	11
IU, ICV–EUiA, CHA: Plural Left's; Parliamentary Group	EUiA	1	11
Basque Parliamentary Group (EAJ/PNV)	EAJ/PNV	5	5
Union, Progress and Democracy's; Parliamentary Group	UPyD	4	4
Mixed Parliamentary Group	Sortu	5	18
Mixed Parliamentary Group	ERC	3	18
Mixed Parliamentary Group	BNG	2	18
Mixed Parliamentary Group	UPN	1	18
Mixed Parliamentary Group	EA	1	18
Mixed Parliamentary Group	Aralar	1	18
Mixed Parliamentary Group	CCa	1	18
Mixed Parliamentary Group	NCa	1	18
Mixed Parliamentary Group	Compromís	1	18
Mixed Parliamentary Group	FAC	1	18
Mixed Parliamentary Group	GBai	1	18

Parliamentary composition in October 2015
Senate (Note: 1 PP appointed seat remained vacant until 14 December 2016.)
Groups	Parties	Senators	
Groups	Parties	Seats	Total
People's Parliamentary Group in the Senate	PP	149	153
People's Parliamentary Group in the Senate	PAR	3	153
People's Parliamentary Group in the Senate	CCN	1	153
Socialist Parliamentary Group	PSOE	66	66
Convergence and Union's; Catalan Parliamentary Group in the Senate	CDC	10	13
Convergence and Union's; Catalan Parliamentary Group in the Senate	UDC	3	13
Agreement for Catalonia Progress; Parliamentary Group	PSC	7	9
Agreement for Catalonia Progress; Parliamentary Group	ICV	2	9
Basque Parliamentary Group in the Senate (EAJ/PNV)	EAJ/PNV	5	5
Mixed Parliamentary Group	Podemos	5	19
Mixed Parliamentary Group	Sortu	3	19
Mixed Parliamentary Group	Cs	2	19
Mixed Parliamentary Group	UPN	2	19
Mixed Parliamentary Group	AMF	1	19
Mixed Parliamentary Group	EA	1	19
Mixed Parliamentary Group	CCa	1	19
Mixed Parliamentary Group	AHI	1	19
Mixed Parliamentary Group	ERC	1	19
Mixed Parliamentary Group	Compromís	1	19
Mixed Parliamentary Group	INDEP	1 (Note: Juan Morano, former PP legislator.)	19

== Candidates ==
=== Nomination rules ===
Spanish citizens with the right to vote could run for election, provided that they had not been criminally imprisoned by a final sentence or convicted—whether final or not—of offences that involved loss of eligibility or disqualification from public office (such as rebellion, terrorism or other crimes against the state). Additional causes of ineligibility applied to the following officials:

- Members of the Spanish royal family and their spouses;
- Holders of a number of senior public or institutional posts, including the heads and members of higher courts and state institutions; (Note: These comprised the Constitutional Court, the General Council of the Judiciary, the Supreme Court, the Council of State, the Court of Auditors and the Economic and Social Council.) the Ombudsman; the State's Attorney General; high-ranking officials of government departments, the Office of the Prime Minister and other state agencies; government delegates in the autonomous communities; the chair of RTVE; the director of the Electoral Register Office; the governor and deputy governor of the Bank of Spain; the heads of official credit institutions; and members of electoral commissions and of the Nuclear Safety Council;
- Heads of diplomatic missions abroad;
- Judges and public prosecutors in active service;
- Members of the Armed Forces and law enforcement bodies in active service.

Other ineligibility provisions also applied to a number of territorial officials in these categories within their areas of jurisdiction, as well as to employees of foreign states and members of regional governments.

Incompatibility rules included those of ineligibility, and also barred running in multiple constituencies or lists, holding office if the candidacy was later declared illegal (by a final ruling), and combining legislative roles (deputy, senator, and regional lawmaker) with each other or with:

- A number of senior public or institutional posts, including the presidency of the National Commission on Markets and Competition; and leadership positions in RTVE, government offices, public authorities (such as port authorities, hydrographic confederations, or highway concessionary companies), public entities and state-owned or publicly funded companies;
- Any other paid public or private position, except university teaching.

=== Parties and lists ===
The electoral law allowed for parties and federations registered in the interior ministry, alliances and groupings of electors to present lists of candidates. Parties and federations intending to form an alliance were required to inform the relevant electoral commission within 10 days of the election call, whereas groupings of electors needed to secure the signature of at least one percent of the electorate in the constituencies for which they sought election, disallowing electors from signing for more than one list. Concurrently, parties, federations or alliances that had not obtained a mandate in either chamber of the Cortes at the preceding election were required to secure the signature of at least 0.1 percent of electors in the aforementioned constituencies. Additionally, a balanced composition of men and women was required in the electoral lists, so that candidates of either sex made up at least 40 percent of the total composition.

Below is a list of the main parties and alliances which contested the election:

Candidacy	Parties and alliances	Leading candidate	Ideology	Previous result				Gov.	Ref.
Candidacy	Parties and alliances	Leading candidate	Ideology	Congress		Senate		Gov.	Ref.
Candidacy	Parties and alliances	Leading candidate	Ideology	Vote %	Seats	Vote %	Seats	Gov.	Ref.
PP	List: People's Party (PP); Navarrese People's Union (UPN); Forum of Citizens (FAC); Aragonese Party (PAR); Municipal Assemblies of Fuerteventura (AMF)	Mariano Rajoy	Conservatism; Christian democracy	45.0%	187	46.8% (Note: Results for PP (46.3%, 136 senators) and FAC (0.5%, 0 senators) in the 2011 Senate election.)	136	Yes	
PSOE	List: Spanish Socialist Workers' Party (PSOE); Socialists' Party of Catalonia (PSC); New Canaries (NCa)	Pedro Sánchez	Social democracy	28.8%	110	26.0% (Note: PSC–PSOE contested the 2011 Senate election within the Entesa alliance.)	54	No	
DiL	List: Democratic Convergence of Catalonia (CDC); Democrats of Catalonia (DC); Independence Rally (RI.cat)	Francesc Homs	Catalan independence Liberalism	4.2%	16	4.1%	9	No	
unio.cat	List: Democratic Union of Catalonia (unio.cat)	Josep Antoni Duran i Lleida	Regionalism; Christian democracy	4.2%	16	4.1%	9	No	
IU–UPeC	List: United Left (IU) – Communist Party of Spain (PCE) – The Dawn Marxist Organization (La Aurora (OM)) – Republican Left (IR) – Open Left (IzAb) – Feminist Party of Spain (PFE); Popular Unity in Common (UPeC); Aragonese Union (CHA); Asturian Left (IAS); Assembly (Batzarre); Building the Left–Socialist Alternative (CLI–AS); Segoviemos (Segoviemos); Castilian Left (IzCa)	Alberto Garzón	Socialism; Communism	5.5% (Note: Results for IU–LV in the 2011 election, not including ICV–EUiA.)	8	5.1%	0	No	
EH Bildu	List: Create (Sortu); Basque Solidarity (EA); Aralar (Aralar); Alternative (Alternatiba)	Marian Beitialarrangoitia (Note: EH Bildu did not field a single visible leader; instead, prominence was given to the lead candidate in each of the constituencies where it ran. Marian Beitialarrangoitia from Gipuzkoa was later selected as EH Bildu's spokesperson in Congress.)	Basque independence Abertzale left Socialism	1.4% (Note: Results for Amaiur in the 2011 Congress election.)	7	1.3% (Note: Results for Amaiur in the 2011 Senate election, not including Navarre.)	3	No	
UPyD	List: Union, Progress and Democracy (UPyD)	Andrés Herzog	Social liberalism Radical centrism	4.7%	5	1.7%	0	No	
EAJ/PNV	List: Basque Nationalist Party (EAJ/PNV)	Aitor Esteban	Basque nationalism Christian democracy	1.3%	5	1.5%	4	No	
ERC–CatSí	List: Republican Left of Catalonia (ERC); Catalonia Yes (CatSí)	Gabriel Rufián	Catalan independence Left-wing nationalism Social democracy	1.1%	3	1.0%	0	No	
Nós	List: Galician Nationalist Bloc (BNG) – Galician People's Union (UPG) – Galician Movement for Socialism (MGS) – Abrente–Galician Democratic Left (Abrente–EDG); Galicianist Party (PG); Galician Coalition (CG); Communist Party of the Galician People (PCPG); Galician Workers' Front (FOGA)	Carlos Callón	Galician nationalism Left-wing nationalism Socialism	0.8% (Note: Results for BNG in the 2011 election.)	2	0.9%	0	No	
CCa–PNC	List: Canarian Coalition (CCa); Canarian Nationalist Party (PNC); Independent Herrenian Group (AHI)	Ana Oramas	Regionalism; Canarian nationalism Centrism	0.6% (Note: Results for CC–NC–PNC in the 2011 election.)	2	0.4%	1	No	
GBai	List: Expanding (Zabaltzen); Villava Group (AT); Basque Nationalist Party (EAJ/PNV)	Koldo Martínez	Basque nationalism Social democracy	0.2%	1	Contested in alliance (Note: EH Bildu, GBai, I–E (n) and Podemos contested the 2015 Senate election within the Cambio/Aldaketa alliance.)		No	
Cambio/ Aldaketa	List: Basque Country Gather (EH Bildu) (Note: In Navarre.); Yes to the Future (GBai); We Can (Podemos); Left (I–E (n))	Ana Luján	Basque nationalism	Did not contest		0.4% (Note: Results for EH Bildu (0.2%, 0 senators), GBai (0.2%, 0 senators) and I–E (n) (0.1%, 0 senators) in the 2011 Senate election in Navarre.)	0	No	
Podemos	List: We Can (Podemos); Equo (Equo); Rally for Madrid (CxM); Now Upper Aragon in Common (Ahora AltoAragón en Común); In Common We Can (En Comú) – Barcelona in Common (BComú) – We Can (Podem) – Initiative for Catalonia Greens (ICV) – United and Alternative Left (EUiA); It is Time (Compromís–Podemos) – Commitment Coalition (Compromís) – We Can (Podemos/Podem); In Tide (Podemos–Anova–EU) – We Can (Podemos) – Renewal–Nationalist Brotherhood (Anova) – United Left (EU)	Pablo Iglesias	Left-wing populism Direct democracy Democratic socialism	Did not contest				No	
C's	List: Citizens–Party of the Citizenry (C's)	Albert Rivera	Liberalism	Did not contest				No	
ASG	List: Gomera Socialist Group (ASG)	Yaiza Castilla	Insularism; Social democracy	Did not contest				No	

The People's Party (PP) chose to continue its 2011 electoral alliance with the Aragonese Party in Aragon, as well as to establish an alliance with Forum of Citizens in Asturias (the party of former PP member Francisco Álvarez Cascos). The agreement with Navarrese People's Union (UPN) was also maintained, after a period of negotiations in which UPN had considered to contest the general election on its own in Navarre. For the Senate, the PP also ran in alliance with the Municipal Assemblies of Fuerteventura. The Spanish Socialist Workers' Party (PSOE) and New Canaries both announced they would contest the general election together in the Canary Islands. Extremaduran Coalition and United Extremadura broke up their coalitions with both PSOE and PP, respectively, and chose to contest the general together under a single joint list, Extremeños (Spanish for "Extremadurans").

Main electoral alliances for the Congress of Deputies (top to bottom, left to right): PP, PSOE, Podemos and regional-aligned alliances, and IU–UPeC

Podemos set up an extensive alliance system with other parties in various parties. In Catalonia, Podemos, Initiative for Catalonia Greens and United and Alternative Left reached an agreement with Barcelona en Comú—Barcelona mayor Ada Colau's party—to form the En Comú Podem (Catalan for "In Common We Can") platform. In Galicia, Podemos, Anova and United Left merged into the En Marea ticket (Galician for "In Tide"), which also received the support of local alliances that had succeeded in the May 2015 local elections, such as Marea Atlántica, Compostela Aberta or Ferrol en Común. For the Valencian Community, the És el moment alliance (Valencian for "It is Time") was established between Podemos and Compromís, with a strong role from Valencian deputy premier Mònica Oltra. United Left of the Valencian Country had also entered talks to enter the alliance, but left after disagreements with both Podemos and Compromís during negotiations. Additionally, Podemos was to contest the general election in the province of Huesca within the Now Upper Aragon in Common alliance (Spanish: Ahora Alto Aragón en Común). In Navarre, all four Podemos, Geroa Bai, EH Bildu and Izquierda-Ezkerra coalesced under the Cambio-Aldaketa umbrella for the Senate; the agreement was not extended to the Congress election, where all four parties ran separately.

In Catalonia and Galicia, United Left (IU)—which ran nationally under the Popular Unity brand—joined En Marea and En Comú Podem, which supported Podemos at the national level; while a nationwide alliance between Podemos and IU had been considered, disagreements over IU's internal issues and the latter's role within Podemos's lists led to the failure of talks. Environmentalist party Equo was successful at reaching an agreement with Podemos, accepting to integrate itself within Podemos.

After the dissolution of the Convergence and Union (CiU) federation in Catalonia, Democratic Convergence of Catalonia (CDC) joined Democrats of Catalonia and Reagrupament within the Democracy and Freedom alliance after the failure of talks with Republican Left of Catalonia to continue the Junts pel Sí coalition for the general election. CDC's former ally, Josep Antoni Duran i Lleida's Democratic Union of Catalonia (UDC), chose to contest the election alone despite losing its parliamentary presence in the Parliament of Catalonia after the 2015 regional election.

== Campaign ==
=== Timetable ===
The key dates are listed below (all times are CET. The Canary Islands used WET (UTC+0) instead):

- 26 October: The election decree is issued with the countersign of the prime minister, after deliberation in the Council of Ministers, ratified by the King.
- 27 October: Formal dissolution of parliament and start of prohibition period on the inauguration of public works, services or projects.
- 30 October: Initial constitution of provincial and zone electoral commissions with judicial members.
- 2 November: Division of constituencies into polling sections and stations.
- 6 November: Deadline for parties and federations to report on their electoral alliances.
- 9 November: Deadline for electoral register consultation for the purpose of possible corrections.
- 16 November: Deadline for parties, federations, alliances, and groupings of electors to present electoral lists.
- 18 November: Publication of submitted electoral lists in the Official State Gazette (BOE).
- 21 November: Deadline for non-resident citizens (electors residing abroad (CERA) and citizens temporarily absent from Spain) to apply for voting.
- 23 November: Official proclamation of validly submitted electoral lists.
- 24 November: Publication of proclaimed electoral lists in the BOE.
- 25 November: Deadline for the selection of polling station members by sortition.
- 3 December: Deadline for the appointment of non-judicial members to provincial and zone electoral commissions.
- 4 December: Official start of electoral campaigning.
- 10 December: Deadline to apply for postal voting.
- 15 December: Start of legal ban on electoral opinion polling publication; deadline for CERA citizens to vote by mail.
- 16 December: Deadline for postal and temporarily absent voting.
- 18 December: Last day of electoral campaigning; deadline for CERA voting.
- 19 December: Official election silence ("reflection day").
- 20 December: Election day (polling stations open at 9 am and close at 8 pm or once voters present in a queue at/outside the polling station at 8 pm have cast their vote); provisional vote counting.
- 23 December: Start of general vote counting, including CERA votes.
- 26 December: Deadline for the general vote counting.
- 4 January: Deadline for the proclamation of elected members.
- 14 January: Deadline for the reconvening of parliament (date determined by the election decree, which for the 2015 election was set for 13 January).
- 13 February: Deadline for the publication of definitive election results in the BOE.

=== Party slogans ===
Party or alliance	Original slogan	English translation	Ref.
PP	« España en serio »	"Spain seriously"	
PSOE	« Un futuro/un presidente para la mayoría »	"A future/a president for the many"	
DiL	« ~~(Im)~~Possible »	"~~(Im)~~Possible"	
unio.cat	« Solucions! »	"Solutions!"	
IU–UPeC	« Por un nuevo país »	"For a new country"	
EH Bildu	« Bildu erabakira » « Únete a la decisión »	"Join the decision"	
EAJ/PNV	« Lehenik Euskadi. Euskadi es lo que importa »	"The Basque Country first. The Basque Country is what matters"	
UPyD	« Más España »	"More Spain"	
ERC–CatSí	« Defensa el teu vot »	"Defend your vote"	
Nós	« A forza do noso pobo »	"The strength of our people"	
CCa–PNC	« Luchar por Canarias »	"Fighting for the Canaries"	
GBai	« Defiende Navarra. Nafarron Hitza Madrilen »	"Defend Navarre. The voice of the Navarrese people in Madrid"	
Podemos: En Comú; És el moment; En Marea	Main: « Un país contigo. Podemos » En Comú: « El canvi no s'atura » És el moment: « Justament és el moment » En Marea: « Para mudalo todo, para que nada siga igual »	Main: "A country with you. We can" En Comú: "The change does not stop" És el moment: "It is precisely the time" En Marea: "To change everything, so that nothing remains the same"	
C's	« Con ilusión »	"With hope"	

=== Events and issues ===
Opinion polls heading into the campaign had shown the PP firmly in first position, with both PSOE and C's tied for second place and Podemos trailing in fourth. However, as the campaign started and election day neared, Podemos numbers had begun to rebound while C's slipped. Podemos centered its campaign around the slogan of "remontada" (Spanish for "comeback"), trying to convey voters a message of illusion and optimism. After the Atresmedia televised debate on 7 December—in which Iglesias was said to have outperformed all other three with his final address—and following a series of gaffes by C's leaders that had affected their party's campaign, Podemos experienced a surge in opinion polls. By Monday 14 December it had reached a statistical tie with C's, and kept growing and approaching the PSOE, vying for second place, in the polls conducted—but unpublished by Spanish media—after the legal ban on opinion polls during the last week of campaigning had entered into force. On 18 December, the final day of campaigning, Podemos staged a massive rally in la Fonteta arena in Valencia, in support of the Compromís–Podemos–És el moment coalition and as the closing point of their campaign. With a capacity of over 9,000 people, 2,000 were left outside as the interior was entirely filled. It was noted by some media as a remarkable feat, as the PSOE had been unable to entirely fill the same place just a few days earlier on 13 December.

The most notable incident during the electoral campaign was an attack on Mariano Rajoy during a campaign event in Pontevedra on 16 December. At 18:50, while walking with Development Minister Ana Pastor in the vicinity of the Pilgrim Church, a 17-year-old approached him and punched him in the temple. The assailant was restrained by the Prime Minister's security guards and was subsequently transferred to the police station in the city. Rajoy, who was red-faced and stunned for a few seconds, continued to walk without his glasses, broken during the assault. The assailant turned out to be related to Rajoy's wife, as he was the son of a cousin of Elvira Fernández, and also a member of a family known for sympathizing with the People's Party.

The following day, Rajoy attended a European Council meeting in Brussels, where Angela Merkel and other European leaders approached him showing their support after the assault. During the meeting a camera recorded Rajoy, Merkel and other leaders discussing the electoral prospects of Spanish parties. Rajoy revealed to them that, according to PP internal opinion polls, Podemos was rising quickly and approaching the PSOE, to the point that there was the possibility of it becoming the second political force of the country. Merkel expressed concern about such an event.

=== Debates ===
A total of four debates involving the leaders of at least two of the four parties topping opinion polls (the People's Party, Spanish Socialist Workers' Party, Podemos and Citizens) were held throughout the pre-campaign and campaign periods.

The first debate was organized by the Demos Association and held in the Charles III University of Madrid on 27 November. The leaders of the four main parties were invited, but in the end only Pablo Iglesias and Albert Rivera attended. The debate was broadcast live on YouTube.

The second debate was held on 30 November. Organized by El País newspaper, it was broadcast live entirely through the websites of El País and Cinco Días, the Cadena SER radio station and on the 13 TV television channel. Pedro Sánchez, as well as Iglesias and Rivera, attended the debate. Mariano Rajoy (PP) was also invited to the debate but declined the offer. According to the organizer, PP proposed instead the presence of the deputy prime minister, Soraya Sáenz de Santamaría, but it was rejected as she "was not the PP candidate". A poll conducted online immediately after the debate by El País to its readers showed Iglesias winning with 47.0%, followed by Rivera with 28.9% and Sánchez with 24.1%.

A third, televised debate was organized by Atresmedia, held on 7 December and broadcast live simultaneously on its Antena 3 and laSexta TV channels and on the Onda Cero radio station. Rajoy had also been invited to the debate, but the PP announced that Soraya Sáenz de Santamaría would attend in his place instead. The audience for the debate averaged 9.2 million, peaking at more than 10 million. Online polls conducted immediately after the debate by major newspapers coincided in showing Iglesias winning, while political pundits and journalists pointed on his strong performance.

A fourth, final debate, organized by the Academy of Television, was held on 14 December. The signal of the debate was offered to all interested media. Among others, nationwide TV channels La 1, Canal 24 Horas, Antena 3, laSexta and 13 TV broadcast the debate live. Iglesias and Rivera were not invited to the debate, with only Rajoy and Sánchez participating. The audience for the debate averaged 9.7 million. A poll conducted by Atresmedia immediately after the debate showed 34.5% saying that "None of them" won, followed by Sánchez with 33.7%, Rajoy with 28.8% and "Both" with 3.0%.

2015 Spanish general election debates
Date	Organizer(s)	Moderator(s)	P Present (Note: Denotes a main invitee attending the event.) S Surrogate (Note: Denotes a main invitee not attending the event, sending a surrogate in their place.) NI Not invited I Invited A Absent invitee										
Date	Organizer(s)	Moderator(s)	PP	PSOE	IU–UPeC	UPyD	Podemos	C's	DiL	unio.cat	PNV	Audience	Ref.
18 October	laSexta (Salvados)	Jordi Évole	A	A	NI	NI	P Iglesias	P Rivera	NI	NI	NI	25.2% (5,214,000)	
21 November	Cuatro (Un Tiempo Nuevo)	Silvia Intxaurrondo	S Maroto	S López	S Sixto	P Herzog	S Errejón	S Girauta	NI	NI	NI	3.2% (449,000)	
26 November	Twitter	Ángel Carmona	S Maroto	S G. Veracruz	S Sánchez	P Herzog	S Errejón	S De Páramo	NI	NI	NI	—	
27 November	UC3M	Carlos Alsina	A	A	NI	NI	P Iglesias	P Rivera	NI	NI	NI	—	
30 November	El País	Carlos de Vega	A	P Sánchez	NI	NI	P Iglesias	P Rivera	NI	NI	NI	—	
6 December	laSexta (El Objetivo) (Note: Economic debate.)	Ana Pastor	P Casado	P Saura	P Garzón	NI	P Álvarez	P Garicano	NI	NI	NI	7.2% (1,268,000)	
7 December	Atresmedia	Ana Pastor; Vicente Vallés	S Santamaría	P Sánchez	NI	NI	P Iglesias	P Rivera	NI	NI	NI	48.2% (9,233,000)	
9 December	La 1 (El debate de La 1)	Julio Somoano	S Casado	S Hernando	P Garzón	P Herzog	S Errejón	S De la Cruz	S Puig	S Surroca	P Esteban	12.1% (2,342,000)	
14 December	ATV	Manuel Campo Vidal	P Rajoy	P Sánchez	NI	NI	NI	NI	NI	NI	NI	48.7% (9,728,000)	

Opinion polls

Candidate viewed as "performing best" or "most convincing" in each debate
Debate	Polling firm/Commissioner	PP	PSOE	Pod.	C's	Tie	None	Question
30 November	El País		24.1	47.0	28.9	–	–	–
7 December	Redondo & Asociados	30.7	16.4	23.9	22.0	–	–	7.0
7 December	CIS	18.3	8.9	31.3	12.0	2.7	16.2	10.6
14 December	Atresmedia	28.8	33.7			3.0	34.5	–
14 December	CIS	26.1	26.9			3.5	37.1	6.4

== Opinion polls ==
Local regression trend line of poll results from 20 November 2011 to 20 December 2015, with each line corresponding to a political party.

== Voter turnout ==
The table below shows registered voter turnout during the election. Figures for election day do not include non-resident citizens, while final figures do.

Region	Time (Election day)									Final		
Region	14:00			18:00			20:00			Final		
Region	2011	2015	+/–	2011	2015	+/–	2011	2015	+/–	2011	2015	+/–
Andalusia	37.76%	34.98%	−2.78	57.66%	55.83%	−1.83	70.69%	71.31%	+0.62	68.90%	69.08%	+0.18
Aragon	39.54%	39.38%	−0.16	57.44%	59.53%	+2.09	72.57%	74.71%	+2.14	70.99%	72.58%	+1.59
Asturias	36.71%	35.35%	−1.36	56.23%	56.96%	+0.73	70.33%	71.22%	+0.89	64.57%	63.77%	−0.80
Balearic Islands	35.17%	35.02%	−0.15	50.37%	52.18%	+1.81	62.20%	65.20%	+3.00	60.96%	63.35%	+2.39
Basque Country	38.34%	39.39%	+1.05	56.08%	58.97%	+2.89	69.22%	71.44%	+2.22	67.34%	69.00%	+1.66
Canary Islands	28.03%	27.38%	−0.65	45.95%	47.42%	+1.47	63.72%	65.65%	+1.93	59.60%	60.33%	+0.73
Cantabria	40.44%	40.34%	−0.10	61.53%	62.31%	+0.78	75.37%	76.00%	+0.63	71.56%	70.97%	−0.59
Castile and León	38.12%	37.18%	−0.94	59.33%	59.48%	+0.15	75.08%	75.95%	+0.87	71.29%	71.22%	−0.07
Castilla–La Mancha	39.53%	37.54%	−1.99	61.71%	59.70%	−2.01	76.71%	76.49%	−0.22	75.76%	75.26%	−0.50
Catalonia	35.55%	35.24%	−0.31	53.21%	56.62%	+3.41	66.83%	70.98%	+4.15	65.16%	68.63%	+3.47
Extremadura	39.67%	35.91%	−3.76	59.60%	56.39%	−3.21	75.63%	74.11%	−1.52	73.91%	72.17%	−1.74
Galicia	32.87%	33.42%	+0.55	57.28%	58.51%	+1.23	71.82%	73.00%	+1.18	62.21%	61.53%	−0.68
La Rioja	41.88%	40.70%	−1.18	59.73%	60.63%	+0.90	75.88%	76.66%	+0.78	72.78%	72.43%	−0.35
Madrid	39.61%	40.35%	+0.74	61.33%	63.37%	+2.04	76.03%	77.76%	+1.73	73.26%	74.12%	+0.86
Murcia	42.50%	38.51%	−3.99	63.36%	59.29%	−4.07	75.53%	72.96%	−2.57	74.11%	71.14%	−2.97
Navarre	39.11%	39.53%	+0.42	55.82%	59.00%	+3.18	71.34%	74.28%	+2.94	68.91%	70.93%	+2.02
Valencian Community	43.95%	43.25%	−0.70	62.73%	63.51%	+0.78	75.50%	76.58%	+1.08	74.18%	74.79%	+0.61
Ceuta	26.63%	25.36%	−1.27	42.50%	42.33%	−0.17	55.05%	56.44%	+1.39	53.16%	54.36%	+1.20
Melilla	25.56%	23.04%	−2.52	40.08%	38.81%	−1.27	52.85%	53.29%	+0.44	49.43%	49.35%	−0.08
Total	37.88%	37.01%	−0.87	57.65%	58.37%	+0.72	71.71%	73.20%	+1.49	68.94%	69.67%	+0.73

== Results ==
=== Congress of Deputies ===
← Summary of the 20 December 2015 Congress of Deputies election results →
Parties and alliances	Popular vote			Seats	
Parties and alliances	Votes	%	±pp	Total	+/−
People's Party (PP)^{1}	7,236,965	28.71	−16.33	123	−64
Spanish Socialist Workers' Party (PSOE)	5,545,315	22.00	−6.76	90	−20
We Can–In Common–Commitment–In Tide (Podemos)	5,212,711	20.68	New	69	+65
We Can (Podemos)^{2}	3,198,584	12.69	New	42	+42
In Common We Can (En Comú)^{3}	929,880	3.69	+2.54	12	+9
It is Time (Podemos–Compromís)^{4}	673,549	2.67	+2.16	9	+8
In Tide (Podemos–Anova–EU)^{5}	410,698	1.63	+1.31	6	+6
Citizens–Party of the Citizenry (C's)	3,514,528	13.94	New	40	+40
United Left–Popular Unity in Common (IU–UPeC)^{6}	926,783	3.68	−1.81	2	−6
Republican Left of Catalonia–Catalonia Yes (ERC–CatSí)	604,285	2.40	+1.34	9	+6
Republican Left of Catalonia–Catalonia Yes (ERC–CatSí)	601,782	2.39	+1.36	9	+6
Valencian Country Now (Ara PV)^{7}	2,503	0.01	−0.02	0	±0
Democracy and Freedom (DiL)^{8}	567,253	2.25	−1.92	8	−8
Basque Nationalist Party (EAJ/PNV)	302,316	1.20	−0.13	6	+1
Animalist Party Against Mistreatment of Animals (PACMA)	220,369	0.87	+0.45	0	±0
Basque Country Gather (EH Bildu)^{9}	219,125	0.87	−0.50	2	−5
Union, Progress and Democracy (UPyD)	155,153	0.62	−4.08	0	−5
Canarian Coalition–Canarian Nationalist Party (CCa–PNC)^{10}	81,917	0.32	−0.27	1	−1
We–Galician Candidacy (Nós)^{11}	70,863	0.28	−0.48	0	−2
Democratic Union of Catalonia (unio.cat)	65,388	0.26	New	0	±0
Vox (Vox)	58,114	0.23	New	0	±0
Zero Cuts–Green Group (Recortes Cero–GV)	48,675	0.19	New	0	±0
More for the Balearic Islands (Més)^{12}	33,877	0.13	±0.00	0	±0
Communist Party of the Peoples of Spain (PCPE)	31,179	0.12	+0.01	0	±0
Yes to the Future (GBai)	30,642	0.12	−0.05	0	−1
El Pi–Proposal for the Isles (El Pi)	12,910	0.05	New	0	±0
Citizens of Democratic Centre (CCD)	10,827	0.04	+0.04	0	±0
Blank Seats (EB)	10,084	0.04	−0.36	0	±0
Spanish Phalanx of the CNSO (FE de las JONS)	7,495	0.03	+0.02	0	±0
For the Left–The Greens (X Izda)	7,314	0.03	New	0	±0
We Are Valencian (SOMVAL)	6,103	0.02	New	0	±0
For a Fairer World (PUM+J)	4,586	0.02	−0.09	0	±0
Internationalist Solidarity and Self-Management (SAIn)	4,400	0.02	−0.01	0	±0
The Eco-pacifist Greens (Centro Moderado)	3,278	0.01	New	0	±0
Land Party (PT)	3,026	0.01	New	0	±0
Canaries Decides (LV–UP–ALTER)^{13}	2,883	0.01	+0.01	0	±0
Libertarian Party (P–LIB)	2,854	0.01	±0.00	0	±0
Humanist Party (PH)	2,846	0.01	−0.03	0	±0
United Extremadura–Extremadurans (EU–eX)^{14}	2,021	0.01	+0.01	0	±0
Spanish Communist Workers' Party (PCOE)	1,909	0.01	New	0	±0
National Democracy (DN)	1,704	0.01	±0.00	0	±0
Feminist Initiative (IFem)	1,604	0.01	New	0	±0
Regionalist Party of the Leonese Country (PREPAL)	1,419	0.01	±0.00	0	±0
In Positive (En Positiu)	1,276	0.01	New	0	±0
United Free Citizens (CILUS)	1,189	0.00	New	0	±0
Grouped Rural Citizens (CRA)	1,032	0.00	New	0	±0
Navarrese Freedom (Ln)	1,026	0.00	New	0	±0
Forward Valencians (Avant)	1,003	0.00	New	0	±0
Málaga for Yes (mlgXSÍ)	934	0.00	New	0	±0
Family and Life Party (PFyV)	714	0.00	±0.00	0	±0
Andalusians of Jaén United (AJU)	711	0.00	New	0	±0
Independents for Aragon (i)	676	0.00	New	0	±0
Democratic Forum (FDEE)	456	0.00	New	0	±0
To Solution (Soluciona)	409	0.00	New	0	±0
Social Justice, Citizen Participation (JS, PC)	406	0.00	New	0	±0
Death to the System (+MAS+)	313	0.00	±0.00	0	±0
Liberal Party of the Right (PLD)	205	0.00	New	0	±0
Welcome (Ongi Etorri)	110	0.00	New	0	±0
Blank ballots	188,132	0.75	−0.62		
Total	25,211,313			350	±0
Valid votes	25,211,313	99.11	+0.40		
Invalid votes	227,219	0.89	−0.40		
Votes cast / turnout	25,438,532	69.67	+0.73		
Abstentions	11,073,316	30.33	−0.73		
Registered voters	36,511,848				
Sources
Footnotes: ^{1} People's Party results are compared to the combined totals of People's Party and Forum of Citizens in the 2011 election.; ^{2} We Can does not include results in Catalonia, Galicia and Valencian Community.; ^{3} In Common We Can results are compared to Initiative for Catalonia Greens–United and Alternative Left totals in the 2011 election.; ^{4} It is Time results are compared to Commitment Coalition–Equo totals in the 2011 election.; ^{5} In Tide results are compared to United Left of Galicia totals in the 2011 election.; ^{6} United Left–Popular Unity in Common results are compared to United Left–The Greens: Plural Left totals in the 2011 election. It does not include results in Catalonia and Galicia.; ^{7} Valencian Country Now results are compared to Republican Left of the Valencian Country totals in the 2011 election.; ^{8} Democracy and Freedom results are compared to Convergence and Union totals in the 2011 election.; ^{9} Basque Country Gather results are compared to Amaiur totals in the 2011 election.; ^{10} Canarian Coalition–Canarian Nationalist Party results are compared to Canarian Coalition–New Canaries totals in the 2011 election.; ^{11} We–Galician Candidacy results are compared to Galician Nationalist Bloc totals in the 2011 election.; ^{12} More for the Balearic Islands results are compared to PSM–Initiative Greens–Agreement–Equo totals in the 2011 election.; ^{13} Canaries Decides results are compared to Unity of the People totals in the 2011 election.; ^{14} United Extremadura–Extremadurans results are compared to Convergence for Extremadura totals in the 2011 election.

Popular vote
PP	28.71%
PSOE	22.00%
Podemos	20.68%
C's	13.94%
IU–UPeC	3.67%
ERC–CatSí	2.40%
DiL	2.25%
EAJ/PNV	1.20%
EH Bildu	0.87%
CCa–PNC	0.32%
Others	3.21%
Blank ballots	0.75%

Seats
PP	35.14%
PSOE	25.71%
Podemos	19.71%
C's	11.43%
ERC–CatSí	2.57%
DiL	2.29%
EAJ/PNV	1.71%
IU–UPeC	0.57%
EH Bildu	0.57%
CCa–PNC	0.29%

=== Senate ===
← Summary of the 20 December 2015 Senate of Spain election results →
Parties and alliances	Popular vote			Seats	
Parties and alliances	Votes	%	±pp	Total	+/−
People's Party (PP)^{1}	20,105,650	30.31	−16.45	124	−12
Spanish Socialist Workers' Party (PSOE)^{2}	14,887,751	22.44	−3.53	47	−7
We Can–In Common–Commitment–In Tide (Podemos)	12,244,416	18.46	New	16	+15
We Can (Podemos)^{3}	7,494,552	11.30	New	9	+9
In Common We Can (En Comú)^{4}	2,022,836	3.05	New	4	+3
It is Time (Podemos–Compromís)^{5}	1,734,332	2.61	+2.13	1	+1
In Tide (Podemos–Anova–EU)^{6}	992,696	1.50	+1.26	2	+2
Citizens–Party of the Citizenry (C's)	7,417,388	11.18	New	0	±0
United Left–Popular Unity in Common (IU–UPeC)^{7}	2,372,637	3.58	−1.28	0	±0
Republican Left–Catalonia Yes (ERC–CatSí)	1,895,501	2.86	+1.81	6	+6
Republican Left–Catalonia Yes (ERC–CatSí)	1,887,613	2.85	+1.82	6	+6
Valencian Country Now (Ara PV)^{8}	7,888	0.01	−0.01	0	±0
Democracy and Freedom (DiL)^{9}	1,531,259	2.31	−1.78	6	−3
Animalist Party Against Mistreatment of Animals (PACMA)	1,036,736	1.56	+0.97	0	±0
Basque Nationalist Party (EAJ/PNV)	907,267	1.37	−0.09	6	+2
Union, Progress and Democracy (UPyD)	620,704	0.94	−0.73	0	±0
Basque Country Gather (EH Bildu)^{10}	564,575	0.85	−0.43	0	−3
Change (Cambio/Aldaketa)^{11}	282,889	0.43	−0.02	1	+1
We–Galician Candidacy (Nós)^{12}	279,325	0.42	−0.52	0	±0
Vox (Vox)	196,457	0.30	New	0	±0
Zero Cuts–Green Group (Recortes Cero–GV)	174,481	0.26	New	0	±0
Canarian Coalition–Canarian Nationalist Party (CCa–PNC)^{13}	156,636	0.24	−0.18	1	±0
Democratic Union of Catalonia (unio.cat)	154,702	0.23	New	0	±0
Communist Party of the Peoples of Spain (PCPE)	105,250	0.16	+0.04	0	±0
Blank Seats (EB)	88,802	0.13	−0.69	0	±0
More for Mallorca (Més)^{14}	60,527	0.09	+0.01	0	±0
Spanish Phalanx of the CNSO (FE de las JONS)	37,688	0.06	+0.04	0	±0
El Pi–Proposal for the Isles (El Pi)	30,557	0.05	New	0	±0
For a Fairer World (PUM+J)	20,187	0.03	−0.12	0	±0
Citizens of Democratic Centre (CCD)	20,150	0.03	+0.03	0	±0
We Are Valencian (SOMVAL)	19,950	0.03	New	0	±0
Internationalist Solidarity and Self-Management (SAIn)	18,377	0.03	−0.01	0	±0
Land Party (PT)	10,128	0.02	New	0	±0
United Extremadura–Extremadurans (EU–eX)^{15}	10,065	0.01	±0.00	0	±0
Regionalist Party of the Leonese Country (PREPAL)	9,905	0.01	±0.00	0	±0
Humanist Party (PH)	9,789	0.01	−0.05	0	±0
The Eco-pacifist Greens (Centro Moderado)	9,440	0.01	New	0	±0
Libertarian Party (P–LIB)	7,777	0.01	±0.00	0	±0
Canaries Decides (LV–UP–ALTER)^{16}	6,337	0.01	±0.00	0	±0
United for Gran Canaria (UxGC)	5,885	0.01	New	0	±0
Navarrese Freedom (Ln)	5,710	0.01	New	0	±0
Feminist Initiative (IFem)	5,623	0.01	+0.01	0	±0
Forward Valencians (Avant)	4,948	0.01	New	0	±0
In Positive (En Positiu)	4,548	0.01	New	0	±0
National Democracy (DN)	4,456	0.01	±0.00	0	±0
Gomera Socialist Group (ASG)	4,435	0.01	New	1	+1
We Are Menorca (Som Menorca)^{17}	4,129	0.01	+0.01	0	±0
Forward Badajoz (BA)	4,025	0.01	New	0	±0
United Free Citizens (CILUS)	3,140	0.00	New	0	±0
Independents for Aragon (i)	2,716	0.00	New	0	±0
Andalusians of Jaén United (AJU)	1,836	0.00	New	0	±0
Grouped Rural Citizens (CRA)	1,624	0.00	New	0	±0
To Solution (Soluciona)	1,573	0.00	New	0	±0
Family and Life Party (PFyV)	1,569	0.00	±0.00	0	±0
We (Nosotros)	1,472	0.00	New	0	±0
Social Justice, Citizen Participation (JS, PC)	1,399	0.00	New	0	±0
Merindades of Castile Initiative (IMC)	1,225	0.00	New	0	±0
Democratic Forum (FDEE)	1,222	0.00	New	0	±0
Aragonese Bloc (BAR)	1,183	0.00	New	0	±0
For the Left–The Greens (X Izda)	1,009	0.00	New	0	±0
Blank ballots (Note: The percentage of blank ballots is calculated over the official number of valid votes cast, irrespective of the total number of votes shown as a result of adding up the individual results for each party.)	979,371	4.06	−1.30		
Total	66,336,401			208	±0
Valid votes	24,119,913	96.78	+0.48		
Invalid votes	801,743	3.22	−0.48		
Votes cast / turnout	24,921,656	68.26	−0.17		
Abstentions	11,590,192	31.74	+0.17		
Registered voters	36,511,848				
Sources
Footnotes: ^{1} People's Party results are compared to the combined totals of People's Party and Forum of Citizens in the 2011 election.; ^{2} Spanish Socialist Workers' Party includes Socialists' Party of Catalonia seat totals within the Agreement for Catalonia Progress alliance in the 2011 election.; ^{3} We Can does not include results in Catalonia, Galicia, Navarre and Valencian Community.; ^{4} In Common We Can includes Initiative for Catalonia Greens–United and Alternative Left seat totals within the Agreement for Catalonia Progress alliance in the 2011 election.; ^{5} It is Time results are compared to Commitment Coalition–Equo totals in the 2011 election.; ^{6} In Tide results are compared to United Left of Galicia totals in the 2011 election.; ^{7} United Left–Popular Unity in Common results are compared to United Left–The Greens: Plural Left totals in the 2011 election. It does not include results in Catalonia, Galicia and Navarre.; ^{8} Valencian Country Now results are compared to Republican Left of the Valencian Country totals in the 2011 election.; ^{9} Democracy and Freedom results are compared to Convergence and Union totals in the 2011 election.; ^{10} Basque Country Gather results are compared to Amaiur totals in the 2011 election, not including results in Navarre.; ^{11} Change results are compared to the combined totals of Basque Country Gather, Yes to Navarre and Left totals in Navarre in the 2011 election.; ^{12} We–Galician Candidacy results are compared to Galician Nationalist Bloc totals in the 2011 election.; ^{13} Canarian Coalition–Canarian Nationalist Party results are compared to Canarian Coalition–New Canaries–Canarian Nationalist Party totals in the 2011 election.; ^{14} More for Mallorca results are compared to PSM–Initiative Greens–Agreement–Equo totals in the 2011 election.; ^{15} United Extremadura–Extremadurans results are compared to Convergence for Extremadura totals in the 2011 election.; ^{16} Canaries Decides results are compared to Unity of the People totals in the 2011 election.; ^{17} We Are Menorca results are compared to Socialist Party of Menorca–Nationalist Agreement totals in the 2011 election.

Popular vote
PP	30.31%
PSOE	22.44%
Podemos	18.46%
C's	11.18%
IU–UPeC	3.58%
ERC–CatSí	2.86%
DiL	2.31%
PACMA	1.56%
EAJ/PNV	1.37%
Cambio/Aldaketa	0.43%
CCa–PNC	0.24%
ASG	0.01%
Others	3.79%
Blank ballots	4.06%

Seats
PP	59.62%
PSOE	22.60%
Podemos	7.69%
ERC–CatSí	2.88%
DiL	2.88%
EAJ/PNV	2.88%
Cambio/Aldaketa	0.48%
CCa–PNC	0.48%
ASG	0.48%

=== Maps ===
Election results by constituency (Congress).

Vote winner strength by constituency (Congress).

Vote winner strength by autonomous community (Congress).

== Aftermath ==
=== Outcome ===
The election results produced the most fragmented parliament in recent Spanish history. As opinion polls had predicted, the People's Party (PP) was able to secure first place with a clear lead over its rivals, but it lost the absolute majority it had held since 2011 in the Congress of Deputies. Its 123 seat-count was the worst result ever obtained by a winning party in a Spanish general election—previously been 156 seats in 1996. Its result was also slightly below the party's expected goal of reaching 30% of the vote. The party's net loss of seats (64 fewer than in 2011) and vote share drop (minus 16 percentage points) was the PP's largest fall in popular support in its history, as well as the worst showing for a sitting government in Spain since 1982. Overall, it was also the worst result obtained by the PP in a general election since 1989, back to the party's refoundation from the People's Alliance.

The Spanish Socialist Workers' Party (PSOE) obtained its worst election result in recent history, with just 22% of the total party vote and 90 seats, well below Pedro Sánchez's target of at least 100 seats. Losing 20 seats and nearly seven percentage points to its already negative 2011 result, this was the first time since the Spanish transition to democracy that one of the two largest parties fell below the 100-seat mark. Overall, while able to hold on to its second place nationally in terms of votes and seats, it lost the second and first place to Podemos in 8 out of the 17 autonomous communities, and finished fourth in Madrid, the capital's district. It was able to narrowly win in Andalusia and Extremadura—which it had resoundingly lost to the PP in 2011—thanks to the PP vote collapse in those regions, but it lost in Barcelona for the first time ever in a general election, and its sister party, the Socialists' Party of Catalonia, was reduced to third party status in Catalonia after decades of political dominance.

The combined results for the top two parties was also the worst for any general election held since 1977 and up until that point, gathering just 51% of the total party vote and 213 seats, just slightly above the required 3/5 majority for an ordinary constitutional reform. The result was regarded as a loss for bipartisanship in Spain as a whole, as the era of bipartisan politics was declared officially over by newcomers Podemos and C's, as well as by both national and international media.

Podemos, which contested a general election for the first time after having been founded in January 2014, obtained an unprecedented 21% of the vote and 69 seats together with its regional alliances, the best result ever obtained by a third party in a Spanish election. Coming short by 340,000 votes of securing its campaign goal of becoming the main left-wing party in Spain, it managed to secure second place in 6 out of the 17 autonomous communities and came top in another two—the Basque Country and Catalonia. This result was ahead of what initial pre-campaign and campaign opinion polls had predicted, and was in line with a late-campaign surge in support for the party. C's also had a strong performance for a national party in Spain, but its fourth place, 14% of the share and 40 seats were considered a letdown for party leader Albert Rivera, mainly as a consequence of the high expectations that had been generated around his candidacy. Pre-election opinion polls had placed C's near or above 20% of the vote share, and many also suggested a strong possibility of C's disputing second place to PSOE. Finally, it only came ahead of either PSOE or PP in Madrid and Catalonia. The party also found itself in a weaker political position than predicted, as the "kingmaker" position that was thought to go to C's under opinion polling projections finally went to PSOE, with the Congress's fragmentation resulting from the election meaning that neither the PP–C's nor the PSOE–Podemos–IU blocs would be able to command a majority on their own.

=== Government formation ===
Investiture; Congress of Deputies; Nomination of Pedro Sánchez (PSOE)
Ballot →	2 March 2016	4 March 2016
Required majority →	176 out of 350	Simple
Yes: • PSOE (89); • C's (40); • NCa (1); • CCa (1) (on 4 Mar)	130 / 350	131 / 350
No: • PP (119); • Pod–ECP–EM (65); • ERC (9); • DiL (8); • PNV (6); • Compromís (4); • IU–UPeC (2); • EH Bildu (2); • UPN (2); • FAC (1); • Independent (1)	219 / 350	219 / 350
Abstentions: • CCa (1) (on 2 Mar)	1 / 350	0 / 350
Absentees	0 / 350	0 / 350

== Bibliography ==
Legislation

- Constitución Española (Constitution). Official State Gazette (in Spanish). 27 December 1978 [version as of 27 September 2011]. BOE-A-1978-31229.
- Ley Orgánica 5/1985, de 19 de junio, del Régimen Electoral General (Organic Law 5/1985). Official State Gazette (in Spanish). 19 June 1985 [version as of 31 March 2015]. BOE-A-1985-11672.
- Real Decreto 977/2015, de 26 de octubre, de disolución del Congreso de los Diputados y del Senado y de convocatoria de elecciones (Royal Decree 977/2015). Official State Gazette (in Spanish). 26 October 2015. BOE-A-2015-11505.

Other

- Carreras de Odriozola, Albert; Tafunell Sambola, Xavier (2005) [1989]. Estadísticas históricas de España, siglos XIX-XX (PDF) (in Spanish). Vol. 1 (II ed.). Bilbao: Fundación BBVA. pp. 1072–1097. ISBN 84-96515-00-1. Archived from the original (PDF) on 24 September 2015.
