= Democracy and Freedom =

Democracy and Freedom Democràcia i Llibertat
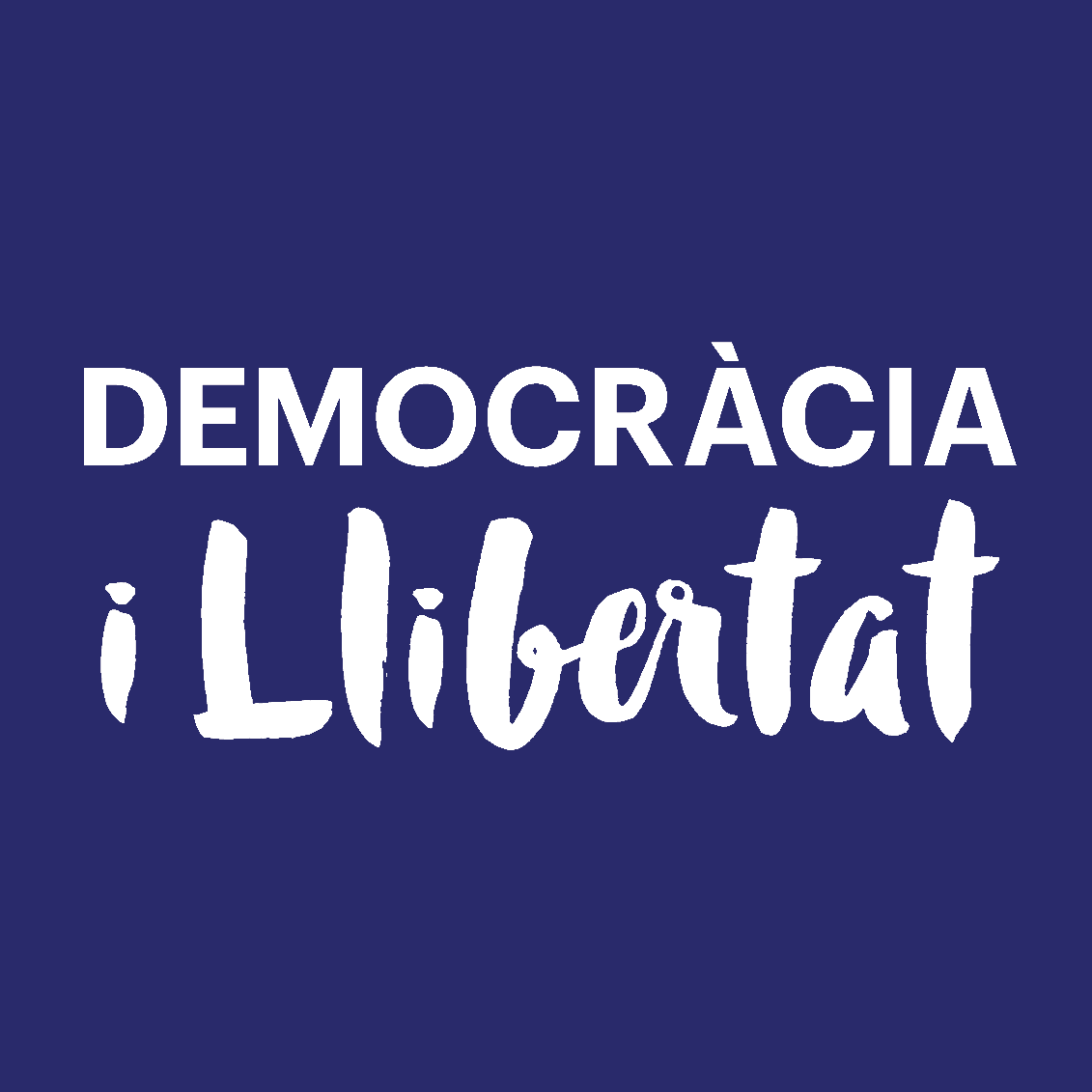
- Abbreviation: DiL
- Spokesperson: Francesc Homs
- Founded: 6 November 2015
- Dissolved: 13 May 2016
- Headquarters: C/ Còrsega, 333; 08037, Barcelona
- Ideology: Catalan independence; Liberalism; Christian democracy
- Political position: Centre-right
- Members: See list of members

Website
- www.democraciaillibertat.cat

Democracy and Freedom (Catalan: Democràcia i Llibertat, DiL) was an electoral alliance in Catalonia established to contest the 2015 Spanish general election. It was formed by Democratic Convergence of Catalonia (CDC), Democrats of Catalonia (DC) and Reagrupament (RI.cat).

== History ==
After the 2015 Catalan regional election had seen Democratic Convergence of Catalonia (CDC) and Republican Left of Catalonia (ERC) teaming up into the Junts pel Sí alliance, speculation arose on the future of such alliance for other electoral contests and on whether it would be maintained ahead of the upcoming 2015 Spanish general election scheduled for 20 December under a "super-creative formula". On 30 October 2015, it was confirmed that they both parties would be standing in separate lists but with "shared manifestos", as ERC's refusal to accept regional presidency minister and government spokesperson Francesc Homs as the leading candidate as well as CDC's aims to control the future parliamentary group put down any prospects of a full-fledged electoral alliance.

On 4 November, it was unveiled that CDC was in talks with Democrats of Catalonia (DC) to form a joint list for the general election. On 6 November 2015, the alliance was made public and announced to include CDC, DC and Reagrupament (RI.cat) under the "Democracy and Freedom" label, with Francesc Homs as its leading candidate. The party memberships of both CDC and DC ratified the decision with a support of 84% and 78%, respectively.

On 9 May 2016, CDC announced its intention to contest the 2016 Spanish general election on its own, choosing not to renew the alliance with DC and RI.cat, thus bringing the coalition to an end. DC and RI.cat subsequently decided not to contest the general election, citing the failure in building up a "broad alliance" of pro-independence parties as their main reason.

== Composition ==
Party
Democratic Convergence of Catalonia (CDC)
Democrats of Catalonia (DC)
Independence Rally (RI.cat)

== Electoral performance ==
=== Cortes Generales ===
==== Nationwide ====
Cortes Generales
Election	Congress					Senate		Leading candidate	Status in legislature
Election	Votes	%	#	Seats	+/–	Seats	+/–	Leading candidate	Status in legislature
2015	567,253	2.25%	7th	8 / 350	2 (Note: Compared to Democratic Convergence of Catalonia totals (within Convergence and Union) in the 2011 general election.)	6 / 208	1	Francesc Homs	New election

==== Regional breakdown ====
Election	Catalonia						
Election	Congress					Senate	
Election	Votes	%	#	Seats	+/–	Seats	+/–
2015	567,253	15.08%	4th	8 / 47	2	6 / 16	1
