= Pokémon (disambiguation) =

Pokémon is a media franchise based on a series of collectible creatures.

Pokémon or Pokemon may refer to:

== Pokémon products ==
- Pokémon (video game series), a series of video games developed by Game Freak
- Pokémon (TV series), an anime series based on the video games
- Pokémon Concierge, a stop-motion animation series
- Pokémon Pocket Monsters, a manga series based on the video games
- Pokémon Trading Card Game, a collectible card game based on the video games

=== Fictional characters ===
- List of Pokémon, the eponymous fictional characters upon which the franchise is based

== Other uses ==
- Pokemón, a youth subculture in Chile
- Pokemon (gene), an oncogene now called Zbtb7
- "Pokémon", a track by Neil Cicierega from the album Mouth Silence
- "Pokemon", a song by Wet Leg from the album Moisturizer
- Operation Pokémon, a Spanish corruption investigation

== See also ==
- Pokimane (Imane Anys, born 1996), Twitch streamer and YouTuber
- "Pokey Mom", a 2001 episode of The Simpsons
