= Democrats of Catalonia =

Catalan political party

Democrats of Catalonia Demòcrates de Catalunya
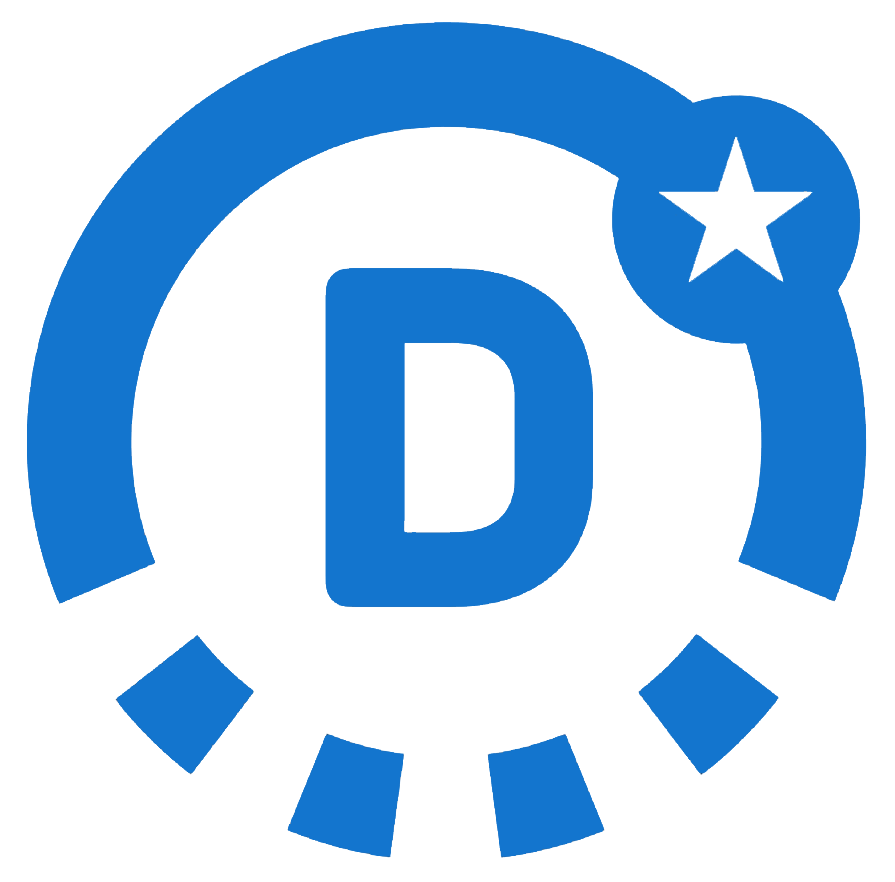
- Abbreviation: DC
- President: Núria de Gispert
- Secretary-General: Antoni Castellà
- Founded: 12 July 2015
- Registered: 31 August 2015
- Split from: Democratic Union of Catalonia
- Headquarters: C/ Calàbria, 149-151, ent. 2ªA; 08015, Barcelona
- Membership (2020): 2,562
- Ideology: Conservatism; Christian democracy; Catalan independence; Anti-Spanish sentiment; Anti-French sentiment Països Catalans
- Political position: Centre-right to right-wing, with far-right factions
- Regional affiliation: Junts pel Sí (2015–2017); Democracy and Freedom (2015–2016); Republican Left of Catalonia–Catalonia Yes (2017–2020); Junts (since 2020)
- Parliament of Catalonia: 1 / 135

Website
- www.democrates.cat

Democrats of Catalonia (Catalan: Demòcrates de Catalunya, DC) is a Christian-democratic, pro-Catalan independence political party in Catalonia founded in July 2015 from a split in Democratic Union of Catalonia (UDC). Its members included the then-Speaker of the Catalan parliament Núria de Gispert and former UDC president Joan Rigol. The party has received accusations of xenophobia by radical pro-Spanish websites and/or newspapers, due its controversial statements against Spaniards, and for having ties with xenophobic organizations, due to its participation in meetings in which far-right parties were included, in this late case, certain people and groups who attended it said they weren't told that far right groups would be present.

== History ==
The party was founded in July 2015 by former members of the Democratic Union of Catalonia (UDC)—including Antoni Castellà, Núria de Gispert, Rosa Maria Carrasco Azemar and Joan Rigol—following the break up of Convergence and Union over dissatisfaction with what they saw as weak support from UDC to the Catalan independence movement. It was registered in the interior ministry in August 2015. On 8 August 2015, Castellà declared that it had secured the support of 1,600 volunteers within 20 days, as well as the pledged support of 23 out of the 43 UDC city mayors and 118 out of UDC's 191 city councillors.

The party's strategy has been to contest elections within electoral alliances with other parties. For the 2015 Catalan regional election, it joined the Junts pel Sí (English: "Together for Yes") big-tent alliance for Catalan independence together with Democratic Convergence of Catalonia (CDC), Republican Left of Catalonia (ERC) and Left Movement (MES). In the 2015 Spanish general election, DC joined the Democracy and Freedom (DiL) electoral coalition together with CDC and Reagrupament (RI.cat). The party chose not to contest the 2016 general election following CDC's decision to discontinue the DiL alliance, because of "the impossibility of offering Catalan voters a big-tent list with independents defending the process towards an independent Catalan State".

In July 2016, the party would see a conflict with CDC over the latter's decision to refound itself into the "Catalan Democratic Party", a name which was regarded as problematic by the Spanish interior ministry because of its potential confusion with DC's own name. DC's secretary-general, Antoni Castellà, commented that "if the PDC does not change its label, then there will be conflict within Junts pel Sí", threatening to go to the courts over the issue unless the PDC properly differentiated the aesthetical use of the acronym, the party logo, renounced to use blue as the party's corporate colour and rejected the use of the term Demòcrates (English: "democrats") to refer to party members. The issue was eventually solved after the PDC chose to rebrand itself as the Catalan European Democratic Party (PDeCAT).

The party supported the celebration of an independence referendum in 2017, calling for a "Yes" vote. After the 1 October 2017 referendum and the subsequent constitutional crisis, DC reached an agreement with ERC to join the Republican Left of Catalonia–Catalonia Yes (ERC–CatSí) alliance ahead of the 2017 Catalan regional election, on the grounds of it being "what looks most like a big-tent list".

Ahead of the April 2019 Spanish general election, DC unsuccessfully proposed a "common front" of all independentist parties "with the sole objective of provoking a total and absolute institutional blockade of the Cortes until achieving the implementation of the 1-O results". In July 2019, the party's National Council in favour of pressing for unilateralism and "confrontation with the [Spanish State]" to achieve independence.

In June 2020, DC was commented to be up for consideration in the plans of former Catalan president Carles Puigdemont as a potential ally ahead of his establishment of a new, unitary pro-independence party centered on Together for Catalonia.

== Electoral performance ==
=== Parliament of Catalonia ===
Parliament of Catalonia
Election	Votes	%	#	Seats	+/–	Leading candidate	Status in legislature
2015	Within JxSí			1 / 135	1	Artur Mas	Confidence and supply
2017	Within ERC–CatSí			1 / 135	0	Oriol Junqueras (Note: At the time of the election, Junqueras was in preventive detention in Estremera (Madrid).)	Confidence and supply
2021	Within Junts			1 / 135	0	Laura Borràs	Coalition (ERC–Junts)
2024	Within Junts			1 / 135	0	Carles Puigdemont	Opposition

=== Cortes Generales ===
Election	Catalonia						
Election	Congress					Senate	
Election	Votes	%	#	Seats	+/–	Seats	+/–
2015	Within DiL			1 / 47	1	1 / 16	1

== See also ==
- List of political parties in Catalonia
