= Republican Left of Catalonia–Catalonia Yes =

Political alliance in Spain

Republican Left of Catalonia–Catalonia Yes Esquerra Republicana de Catalunya–Catalunya Sí
- Abbreviation: ERC–CatSí
- Leader: Oriol Junqueras
- Founded: 8 October 2011; 14 years ago
- Dissolved: c. 2020
- Headquarters: C/ Calàbria, 166; 08015, Barcelona
- Ideology: Catalan independence
- Political position: Centre-left to left-wing
- Members: See list of members

Republican Left of Catalonia–Catalonia Yes (Catalan: Esquerra Republicana de Catalunya–Catalunya Sí, ERC–CatSí) was a Catalan pro-independence electoral alliance. The alliance was formed by Republican Left of Catalonia, Catalonia Yes and independents, and in the 2015 and 2016 Spanish general elections it was led by Gabriel Rufián.

For general elections, the alliance was succeeded by Republican Left of Catalonia–Sovereigntists.

== History ==
The alliance was originally formed on 8 October 2011 to contest the 2011 Spanish general election by Republican Left of Catalonia (ERC), Catalonia Yes (CatSí) and Independence Rally (RI.cat), after talks with Catalan Solidarity for Independence (SI) to join the coalition failed to materialize. The alliance with RI.cat would be discontinued ahead of the 2012 Catalan regional election, as the party would support Artur Mas's Democratic Convergence of Catalonia (CDC) list, then sign a collaboration agreement with CDC in March 2014 to run together in subsequent elections. The ERC–CatSí alliance would be temporally discontinued for the 2015 Catalan regional election, as ERC joined the Junts pel Sí list together with CDC and other parties, but it would be re-established ahead of the 2015 and 2016 Spanish general elections with Gabriel Rufián as its leading candidate.

The alliance was maintained for the 2017 regional election, this time joined by Democrats of Catalonia (DC) and Left Movement (MES).

== Composition ==
Party	Notes
Republican Left of Catalonia (ERC)	
Catalonia Yes (CatSí)	
Left Movement (MES)	Joined in November 2017, left in December 2020.
Democrats of Catalonia (DC)	Joined in November 2017, expelled in December 2020.
Independence Rally (RI.cat)	Left in October 2012.

== Electoral performance ==
=== Parliament of Catalonia ===
Parliament of Catalonia
Election	Leading candidate	Votes	%	Seats	Gov.
2012	Oriol Junqueras (Note: At the time of the 2017 election, Junqueras was in preventive detention in Estremera (Madrid).)	498,124	13.7 (#3)	21 / 135	(Note: Confidence and supply.)
2017	Oriol Junqueras	935,861	21.4 (#3)	32 / 135	Yes

=== Cortes Generales ===
Cortes Generales
Election	Leading candidate	Congress			Senate			Gov.
Election	Leading candidate	Votes	%	Seats	Votes	%	Seats	Gov.
2011	Alfred Bosch	256,985	1.1 (#8)	3 / 350	665,554	1.0 (#9)	0 / 208	No
2015	Gabriel Rufián	601,782	2.4 (#6)	9 / 350	1,887,613	2.8 (#6)	6 / 208	No
2016	Gabriel Rufián	632,234	2.6 (#5)	9 / 350	1,928,472	3.0 (#5)	10 / 208	No
