= Muriel Casals i Couturier =

Catalan economist (1945–2016)

Il·lustríssima Senyora Muriel Casals i Couturier GMGC MP
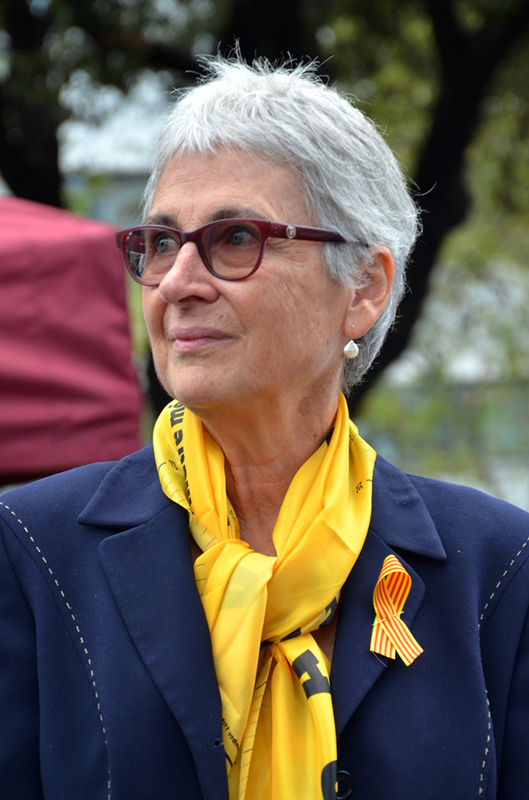

Member of the Parliament of Catalonia
- In office 26 October 2015 – 14 February 2016
- Constituency: Barcelona

President of Òmnium Cultural
- In office 2010–2015
- Preceded by: Jordi Porta i Ribalta
- Succeeded by: Quim Torra

Personal details
- Born: 6 April 1945 Avignon, Provence-Alpes-Côte d'Azur, France
- Died: 14 February 2016 (aged 70) Barcelona, Catalonia, Spain
- Party: Unified Socialist Party of Catalonia (1967-...); Initiative for Catalonia Greens (...-2007); Junts pel Sí (2015-2016)
- Occupation: Economist, professor, politician

Muriel Casals i Couturier (6 April 1945 – 14 February 2016) was a Catalan economist with both Spanish and French nationalities.

== Biography ==
She was born in Avignon, France. Couturier was a professor in the Department of Economics and Historical Economics in the Autonomous University of Barcelona (UAB), where she was also vice dean of International Relations and Cooperation between 2002 and 2005. She specialized in industrial reconversions, the history of economic thought and European economics. Casals was also the representative of the UAB in the Xarxa Vives d'Universitats (Vives University Networks) between 2002 and 2009. She had been a visiting professor at the University of Edinburgh, the London School of Economics and the University of Wales at Bangor.

She was a frequent collaborator with the weekly El Temps and the Economics and Business program on Catalunya Informació. She was a member of the Council of the Catalan Corporation for Public Broadcasting (1983–1988), and member of the Catalan Council of the European Movement. She was a member of the board of the Ateneu Barcelonès (2003–2007). She served on the board of Òmnium Cultural between 2008 and 2015, and had been its president since 10 March 2010.

On 9 September 2011 she received the Premi Identitat, as part of the Nit d'Identitat organized by the group Identitat from Cornellà. Casals died in Barcelona on 14 February 2016 due to complications from being hit by a bicyclist.
