= 2015 Spanish elections =

2015 Spanish elections may refer to one of two nationwide elections held in Spain on 24 May 2015:

- 2015 Spanish local elections, to elect local seats in Spanish municipalities, provinces and island councils.
- 2015 Spanish regional elections, to elect the regional parliaments of thirteen autonomous communities.

For the Spanish general election held in the same year, see 2015 Spanish general election.
