= Cambio-Aldaketa =

Change Cambio-Aldaketa
- Leader: Ana Luján (1st); Ricardo Feliú (2nd)
- Founded: 6 November 2015 (1st); 9 March 2019 (2nd)
- Dissolved: 7 May 2016 (1st); 27 August 2019 (2nd)
- Ideology: Basque nationalism
- Political position: Left-wing
- Colors: Yellow-green; Purple; Red; Orange
- Members: See list of members

Cambio-Aldaketa (English: "Change") was a grouping of electors (Note: This format was used in the two occasions in which the candidacy was fielded.) in Navarre supported by the "quadripartite", the political parties supporting Uxue Barkos's regional government—Geroa Bai, EH Bildu, Podemos and Izquierda-Ezkerra—to contest the 2015 Spanish Senate election. The first incarnation of the alliance was disbanded after it secured only one out of the four directly-elected senators in Navarre, with its stated aim having been to win the election and subsequently obtain three senators.

The coalition was re-established by the same parties ahead of the April 2019 Spanish general election, but it scored a new electoral failure by not being able to obtain any of the senators at stake. This defeat would lead to the agreement's signatories clashing over its interpretation ahead of the election of Navarre's appointed senator in August/September 2019, leading to a fracture within the former quadripartite in which Podemos joined Geroa Bai and the Socialist Party of Navarre (PSN) in the election of the former's preferred candidate whereas EH Bildu stood with Izquierda-Ezkerra's candidate.

== History ==
The coalition was publicly presented by Geroa Bai (GBai), Podemos, EH Bildu and Izquierda-Ezkerra (I–E) on 6 November 2015, with Ana Luján, Patxi Zamora and Iñaki Bernal as the leading candidates, collecting 8,300 signatures in one week out of the 5,020 they required to register it as a grouping of electors. However, despite the list expecting to win the December election in Navarre and, consequently, to secure three out of the four senators at stake in the constituency, all three candidates were outperformed by the Navarrese People's Union–People's Party coalition, meaning that only Ana Luján was elected as senator. The coalition experience was not renewed ahead of the 2016 Spanish general election over Podemos's refusal to do it, despite I–E having expressed interest in maintaining the same format for the Senate.

The alliance was re-established with the same partners on 9 March 2019 ahead of the April general election, with Ricardo Feliú (Podemos), Arturo Goldaracena (EH Bildu) and Ana Luján (GBai) as candidates for the elected seats and agreeing to have I–E Iñaki Bernal elected as the regionally-appointed senator, and the parties were again able to collect a superior number of signatures—8,900—than those legally required. However, the alliance scored a new failure, this time not being able to have a single candidate elected due to being outperformed by the Socialist Party of Navarre (PSN), resulting in GBai regarding the agreement as non-binding when it came to elect the appointed senator in order to pick its own candidate instead.

== Composition ==
Party
Yes to the future (GBai)
Basque Country Unite (EH Bildu)
We Can (Podemos/Ahal Dugu)
Left (I–E)

== Electoral performance ==
=== Senate ===
Senate
Election	Navarre				
Election	Votes		%	Seats	+/–
2015	Ana Luján Martínez; Patxi Zamora Aznar; Iñaki Bernal Lumbreras	97,521; 93,858; 91,510	29.53% 28.42% 27.71%	1 / 4	1
2019 (Apr)	Ricardo Feliú Martínez; Arturo Goldaracena Asa; Ana Luján Martínez	98,555; 95,504; 94,888	27.45% 26.60% 26.43%	0 / 4	0 (Note: Compared to Geroa Bai totals in the 2016 general election.)
