= 3% affair =

Political scandal in Spain

The 3% affair (Spanish: Caso 3 %), also called the Adigsa affair or the Convergence affair, was a political corruption scandal surrounding the Generalitat de Catalunya, under the control of the Convergence and Union (CiU) electoral alliance, illegally taking commissions on public works projects. It was first given attention by the then-President Pasqual Maragall in 2005, and was later shelved. Following Jordi Pujol's admission in 2014 that he and his family had maintained accounts in tax havens for three decades, the investigation was reopened. As of 2025, the case remains ongoing.

In January 2018, the CiU and its successor, the Catalan European Democratic Party, were charged with influencing trafficking, bribery and money laundering. The CiU folded in 2015 owing to internal division over its independence strategy,

== Background ==
“Vostès tenen un problema, i aquest problema es diu tres per cent.“

[You have a problem, and that problem is about the 3%.]

— Pasqual Maragall

The case became public on 24 February 2005, following a collapse caused by underground works on the Barcelona Metro in the Carmel area of Barcelona. The President of Catalonia, Pasqual Maragall, had aimed to defend his administration when he said in parliament: "You have a problem, and this problem is called the 3%". The statement alluded to a rumour in an editorial in the El Periódico newspaper that Artur Mas' staff had taken commission from the awarding of public works projects when he had been the First Minister from 2001 until 2003. Mas responded by threatening to remove his party's support for the upcoming Statute of Autonomy, which needed the support of Mas' CiU to pass and sued Mas for slander. Maragall retracted his comment, and Mas dropped the suit.

A parliamentary committee was formed to investigate Maragall's accusations, which concluded on 25 May 2005 that the collection of commissions through the awarding of contracts could not reasonably be proven, but nonetheless recommended mechanisms to promote transparency when awarding them, such as scrapping private donations.

On 16 December 2005, the Chief Prosecutor of Catalonia, José María Mena Álvarez, opened an investigation into Adigsa, the Catalan Government's organisation for allocating social housing. The case alleged that its former leader, Ferran Falcó and his advisor Josep Anton Fondevila, had illegally collected 20% commission between 2002 and 2004 on maintaining second-hand flats, which generated between €3,000 and €6,000 in commissions. Juan Antonio Salguero was judged to have paid a 20% commission for Adigsa contracts and sentenced to almost two years in prison.

In 2009, the Pulau de la Música Case confirmed the 3% rumours to be true, with the discovery that the Catalan Government's railway construction firm had paid the CiU's main party, the Democratic Convergence of Catalonia, €6.6 million over at least a decade.

== Investigation reopened ==
In December 2012, the businessman Javier de la Rosa suggested that the family of the long-serving President of Catalonia, Jordi Pujol, had offshore bank accounts in Switzerland and Andorra. Judge Pablo Ruz dismissed the charges. In January 2013, the leaking of a conversation between Alicia Sánchez-Camacho and one of Pujol's former girlfriends led Ruz to reconsider and investigate whether Pujol had taken advantage of a 2012 tax amnesty by the Rajoy government.

In April 2013, Judge Ruz investigated transactions made by Pujol worth up to €32.4 million across thirteen countries. By July 2014, Ruz had begun to investigate Pujol and his ex-wife investing €15 million in five days, prompting him to admit in a statement that he had hidden "money located abroad" from the public finances for thirty-four years, saying that he had "never found the right moment to put everything in order" and asking those he had "defrauded" for forgiveness. According to Pujol, the money was his inheritance from his father, Florenci Pujol, who had died in 1980 and left the money to mature until his children were of age. Pujol Sr. had been investigated in the 1980s for the disappearance of 500 million pesetas from the Catalan Bank, though the case was shelved. Press reports suggested that at least part of the money was around €4 million, located in Andorra.

In June 2021, it was confirmed that no evidence had been found of political corruption, nor any link to the 3% Case. The prosecution of Pujol and his seven children is scheduled to start in November 2025.
