= Junts pel Sí =

Political alliance in Spain

Together for Yes Junts pel Sí
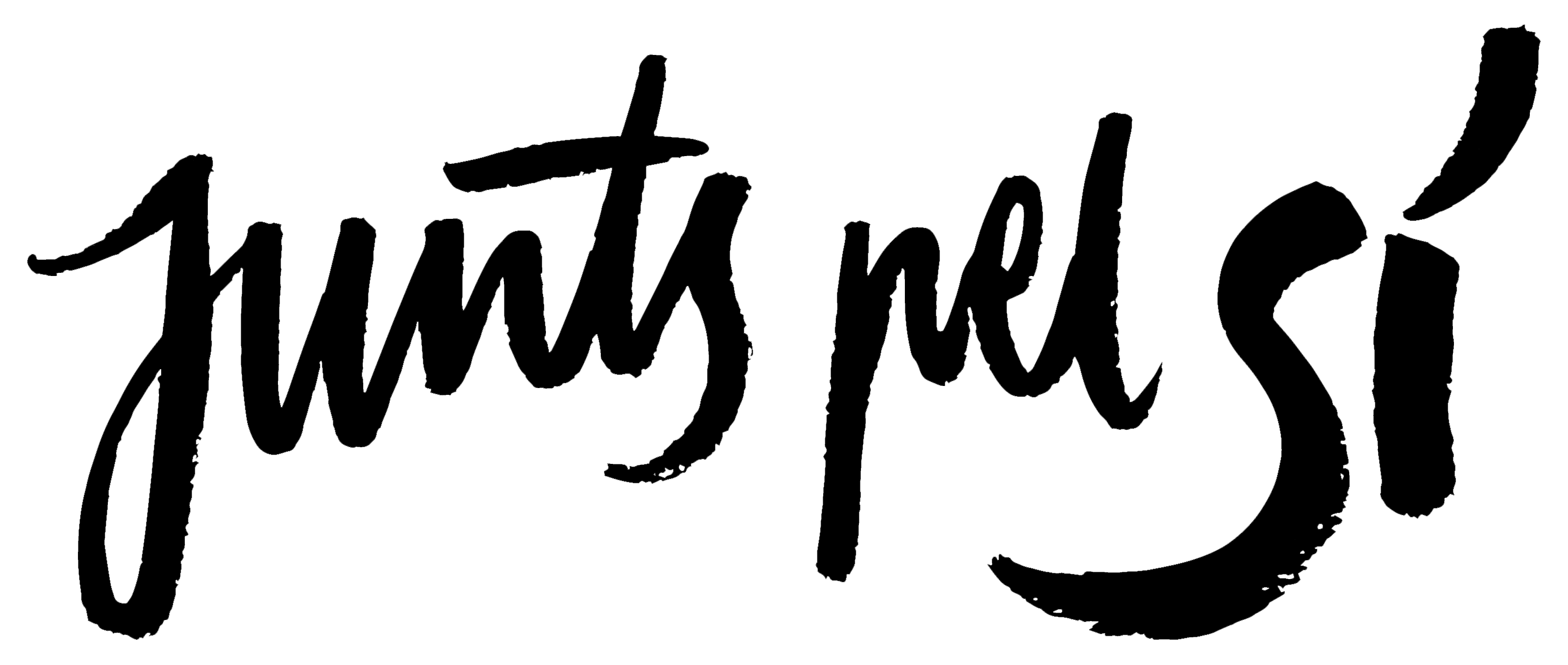
- Abbreviation: JxSí
- Leader: Raül Romeva, Carme Forcadell, Muriel Casals, Artur Mas, Oriol Junqueras
- Founded: 20 July 2015
- Dissolved: 7 November 2017
- Preceded by: Convergence and Union; Republican Left of Catalonia–Catalonia Yes
- Succeeded by: Together for Catalonia; Republican Left of Catalonia–Catalonia Yes
- Headquarters: C/ Còrsega, 333; 08037, Barcelona
- Ideology: Catalan independence
- Political position: Big tent
- Colors: Turquoise; Purple; Red; Yellow
- Members: See list of members

Website
- www.juntspelsi.cat

Junts pel Sí (IPA: [ˈʒuns pəl ˈsi]; English: "Together for Yes", sometimes translated as "Together for the Yes"; JxSí) was a Catalan electoral, political and parliamentary alliance focused on achieving the independence of Catalonia from Spain. Established ahead of the 2015 Catalan regional election, it was formed by Democratic Convergence of Catalonia (CDC), Republican Left of Catalonia (ERC), Democrats of Catalonia (DC), Left Movement (MES) and Independence Rally (RI.cat), as well as a number of independent personalities from pro-independence sectors of civil society, including the pro-independence organizations Catalan National Assembly, Òmnium and the Association of Municipalities for Independence. The Popular Unity Candidacy (CUP) had been invited to participate in the alliance, but refused to do so and ran on its own instead, citing its disagreement with the presence of politicians in the list.

The constituent parties of JxSí formed a minority government after the 2015 election with confidence and supply support from the CUP, and it was responsible for organising the 2017 Catalan independence referendum and overseeing the subsequent constitutional crisis that it sparked. On 4 November 2017, ERC chose not to renew the alliance with the Catalan European Democratic Party (PDeCAT)—CDC's successor—for the 2017 Catalan regional election, having conditioned such event on it having been joined by the CUP, DC and disaffected members from Catalunya en Comú, a hypothesis which did not materialize.

== History ==
=== Background ===
Prospects for the establishment of a unitary electoral list comprising the major pro-Catalan independence forces kicked off following the events of 2012, namely the 11 September independence demonstration in Barcelona, the 25 November regional election and the subsequent confidence and supply agreement between Convergence and Union (CiU)—the party federation comprising Democratic Convergence of Catalonia (CDC) and Democratic Union of Catalonia (UDC)—and Republican Left of Catalonia (ERC) following Catalan president Artur Mas's failure to secure an extended parliamentary majority in the election. Throughout 2013, CiU and ERC considered forming an electoral alliance of parties supporting self-determination for the 2014 European Parliament election, a proposal that also received the support of minor parties such as Ernest Maragall's New Catalan Left (NECat). The list did not materialize because of its rejection by Initiative for Catalonia Greens (ICV) and the reluctance of ERC and UDC.

The issue of the unitary list rose up again in 2014, being proposed by CDC within the context of the self-determination vote on 9 November and discussions about holding a "plebiscitary" regional election at some point during the next year. The idea was rejected by ERC and the Popular Unity Candidacy (CUP), who demanded a snap election, but President Mas replied by pressuring them into a national unity candidacy as a necessary condition for calling an early election. Mas attempted to look for independents from the civil society to incorporate into his electoral list, allegedly as part of his pro-independence plan, in what came to be regarded as an attempt to dilute the CDC/CiU brand after the damage caused to it by the unveiling of major corruption scandals affecting the party, particularly those involving former president and CDC founder Jordi Pujol.

Contacts were established by both CDC and ERC with the pro-independence civil organizations Catalan National Assembly (or ANC) and Òmnium to probe their willingness to have their members join their candidacies ahead of such a plebiscitary election. Some media outlets and political actors also attributed CDC's insistence on the joint list proposal to "Mas's fears of losing re-election" to ERC, amid opinion polling showing both parties vying for victory in an eventual regional election; these rumours were cast off by CDC members defending that Mas was "not afraid" of running on his own, but that his plan still contemplated the establishment of such an electoral alliance with him at its helm. On the other hand, ERC advocated for all pro-independence parties agreeing on a common election manifesto and maintaining separate electoral lists but under a common umbrella, such as using the electoral formulas ERC–Ara es l'hora and CiU–Ara es l'hora (Catalan for "Now is the time").

Finally on 14 January 2015, Mas announced that he had reached an agreement with ERC to hold a "plebiscitary" election on 27 September—turned into an alternative vote on independence—with parties supporting self-determination including independence as a goal in their manifestos and with the issue of the unitary list still up.

=== CiU breakup and negotiations ===
In the lead up to the 27 September election, tensions heightened between CDC and UDC over their stances on Catalan independence, which the former favoured and the latter opposed, as well as on the issue of the unitary list with ERC, to which UDC had never voiced support. As a result, UDC announced that it would hold a vote among its membership following the May 2015 local elections on whether it should keep supporting Mas's independence plan, intending to strengthen its negotiating position and force CDC to slow down its independentist drift. The vote was held on 14 June, resulting in a narrow 51–46 win for the "No" choice supported by the UDC leadership which weakened its position, leading to CDC issuing an ultimatum to UDC to commit itself to the independence plan. UDC's rejection led his members stepping down from Mas's cabinet, as well as to the breakup of the historical CiU alliance which had dominated Catalan politics since the 1980s. Concurrently, UDC's stance would lead to a schism within its ranks, seeing the foundation of Democrats of Catalonia (DC) by UDC members supportive of independence.

The termination of the CiU federation allowed Mas to fully embrace his plan of forming a unitary list ahead of the September election, concerned on the weakening of the CDC brand after the CiU's negative results in the May local elections had seen it losing control of Barcelona to Podemos's supported Ada Colau and her Barcelona en Comú platform. He engaged in talks with ANC and Òmnium to pressure ERC into finally accepting the alliance, which he proposed would not be topped by him but would rather see the leaders of the civil entities comprising the leading posts in the candidacy's lists. However, the ANC and Òmnium pushed for an independent list without politicians, a proposal which was well received by the CUP—which announced their willingness to support such an electoral ticket on the condition that a "constituent election" was held within few months—and subsequently supported by ERC in an attempt to outmaneuver CDC and to put Mas's plan on jeopardy, who did not foresee an electoral list which he was not a member of.

After long negotiations, a CDC–ERC agreement was finally announced on 13 July for a list comprising both politicians and independents from civil society. The agreement, subsequently approved by the leaderships of both parties, provided that the main list for the Barcelona constituency would be led by three independent personalities—former ICV member and MEP Raül Romeva, former ANC president Carme Forcadell and Òmnium chairwoman Muriel Casals—followed by Artur Mas and Oriol Junqueras. Both CDC and ERC agreed that they would distribute politician-reserved posts among themselves at a 60–40 ratio, respectively, with the agreement also providing for Mas to remain the alliance's choice for president, even though he would not be topping the electoral ticket as a result of the power balance achieved by the parties during the negotiations. Places were also reserved in the list for DC and Left Movement (MES), as well as for other pro-independence organizations—such as the Association of Municipalities for Independence—and non-party personalities. The final agreement, as well as former ICV Romeva's pick up to top the list, were said to have been motivated out of opinion polls showing a strong performance by both Podemos and Citizens in the 27 September election. The CUP eventually chose to run separately after its proposal for an independent-only had fallen out of favour. The candidacy was publicly presented on 20 July 2015, and its name revealed to be Junts pel Sí (English: "Together for Yes").

== Composition ==
| Party | Notes |
|---|---|
| Democratic Convergence of Catalonia (CDC) | Refounded as PDeCAT in July 2016. |
| Catalan European Democratic Party (PDeCAT) | From July 2016. |
| Republican Left of Catalonia (ERC) | |
| Democrats of Catalonia (DC) | |
| Left Movement (MES) | |
| Independence Rally (RI.cat) | |
| Independents from civil society | Including members from the ANC, Òmnium and AMI. |

== Electoral performance ==
=== Parliament of Catalonia ===
Parliament of Catalonia
| Election | Votes | % | # | Seats | +/– | Leading candidate | Status in legislature |
| 2015 | 1,628,714 | 39.59% | 1st | 62 / 135 | 9 (Note: Compared to the combined totals of Convergence and Union and Republican Left of Catalonia–Catalonia Yes in the 2012 regional election.) | Artur Mas | Minority |

== Symbols ==
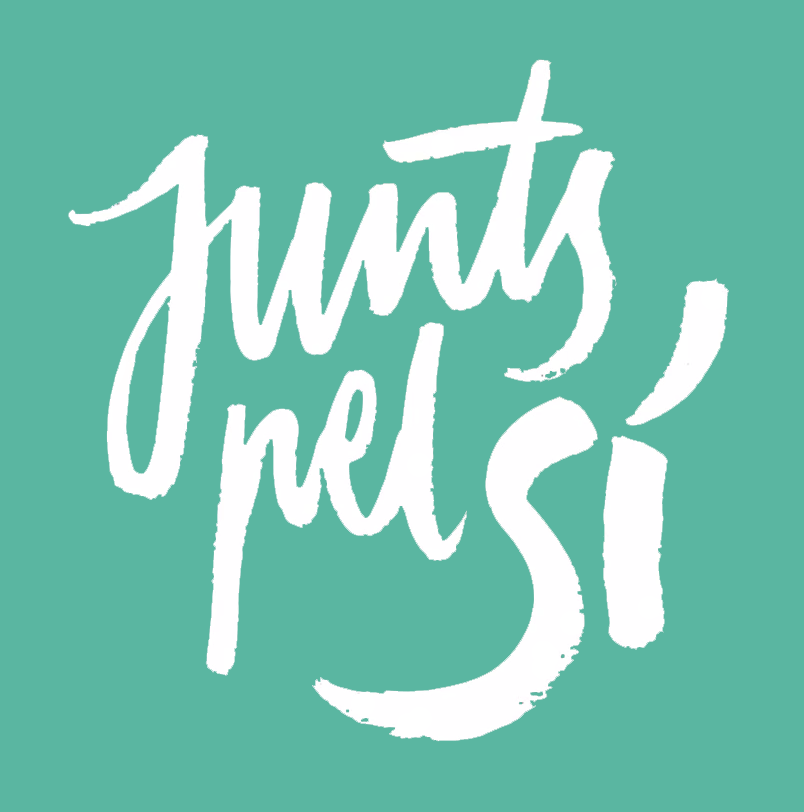
Teal logo.

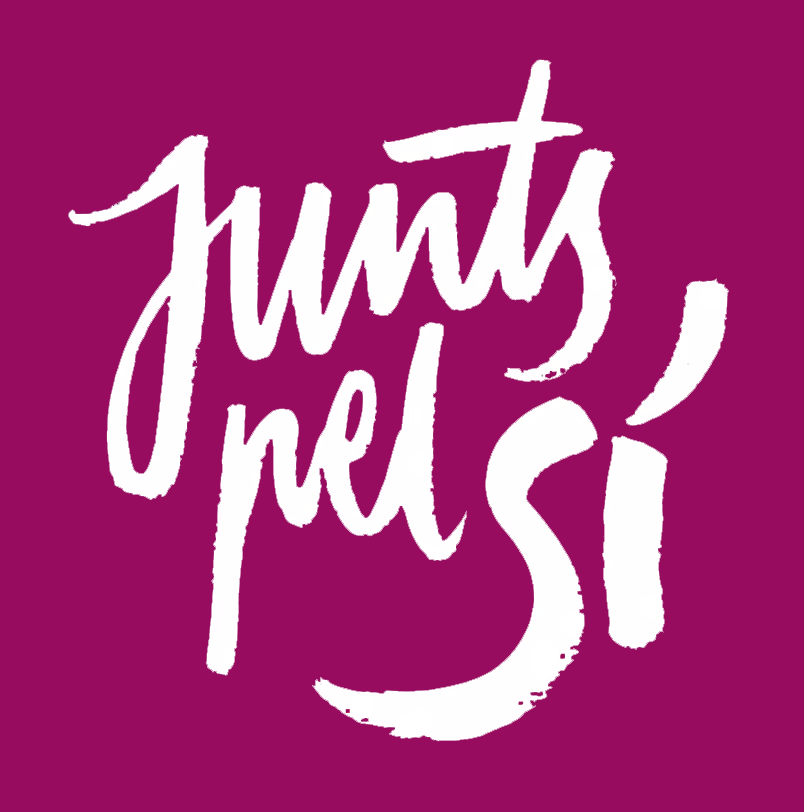
Purple logo.

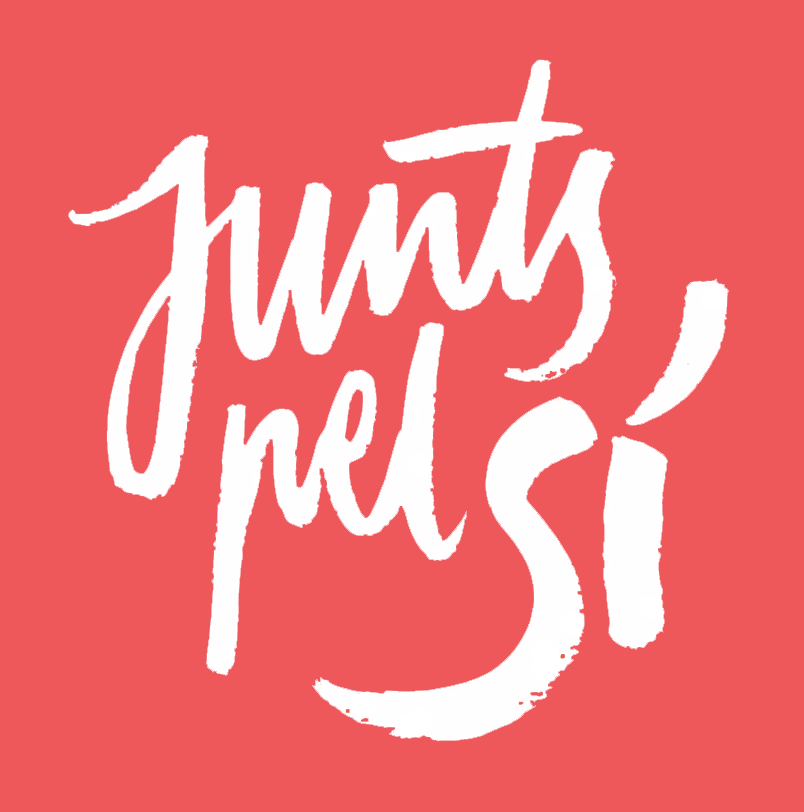
Red logo.

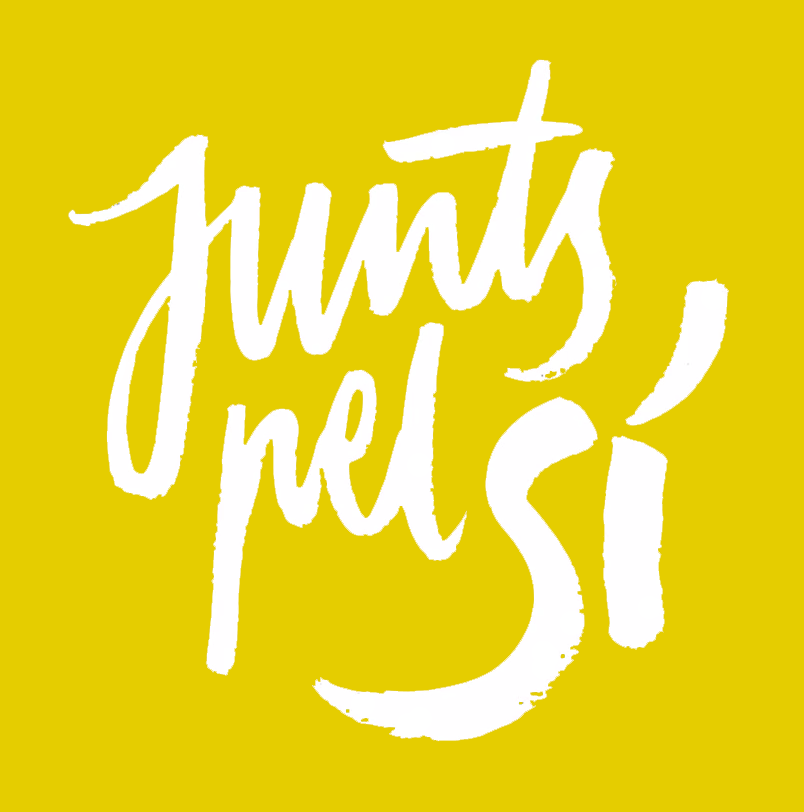
Yellow logo.
