= Operation Pokémon =

Corruption investigation in Spain

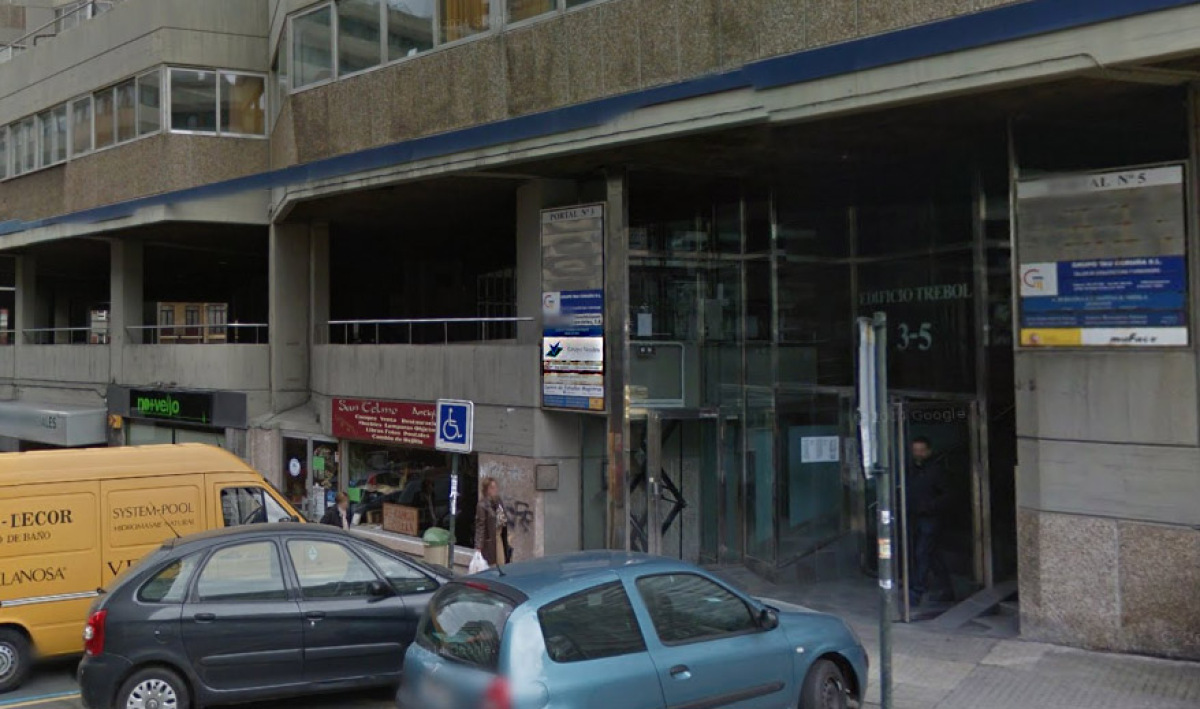
Headquarters in A Coruña of Vendex, a company implicated in Operation Pokémon.

Operation Pokémon (Spanish: Operación Pokémon) was an investigation into political corruption in Spain in September 2012. The large-scale operation centred on Galicia but also extended into other regions. Judge Pilar de Lara of Lugo presided over the operation.

In Lugo, the councillor Francisco Fernández Liñares confessed to taking bribes from the cleaning company Vendex and the towing company Cechalva. He was sentenced to five years in prison in 2021. The dealings of Vendex led to the arrests of mayors Francisco Rodríguez Fernández of Ourense and Adolfo Gacio of Boqueixón, who both resigned their posts. In 2014, two of six charges against Rodríguez Fernández were dismissed, and three more had no evidence. Argimirio Marnotes, the mayor of O Carballiño was cleared in 2015 of any wrongdoing for giving a contract to a weeding company run by a beneficiary of Fernández Liñares.

Several parts of the operation involving other regions of Spain, or the Galician city of Santiago de Compostela, went through lengthy legal processes due to questions of jurisdiction that had to be settled by the Supreme Court.

== Etymology ==
The unusual name for the operation came from the Japanese multimedia franchise Pokémon. The franchise has a large amount of creatures and the slogan "Gotta catch 'em all", which related to the large amount of suspects in this case.

== Parts ==
By October 2018, of the nine parts of the operation, one was dismissed, one awaited trial and seven were not progressing.

=== Lugo ===
Francisco Fernández Liñares, described by ABC as the main suspect of the entire case, was an ally of José López Orozco, the mayor of Lugo (People's Party). In February 2014, he admitted to taking a total of €300,000 in monthly bribes from the companies Vendex and Cechalva, the latter being municipality's tow truck provider. He laundered this income by buying property in the names of third parties, and shares in companies that would receive municipal contracts. López Orozco was absolved of any wrongdoing.

In February 2021, Fernández Liñares argued during his trial that his confession was obtained under threat and coercion. He claimed that he was deprived of sleep and diabetes medication for 96 hours, while an arrest without charge should last no longer than 72 hours. The following month, he was convicted and sentenced to five years in prison and a €7,200 fine, while eight businessmen were sentenced to a year and three months each.

=== Vendex ===
Vendex is a company contracted for a variety of services, most commonly the cleaning of municipal properties such as schools and sport centres. In Operation Pokémon, it was accused by the judge of bribing politicians to earn contracts, and making illicit profits of €295 million.

Francisco Rodríguez Fernández, mayor of Ourense (Spanish Socialist Workers' Party) was arrested in September 2012 on six charges including bribery, corruption, influence peddling, revealing secrets and channeling funds. He resigned days later. In November 2016, the charges of corruption and bribery – relating to the sale of municipal land to the company Compasa and a trip to Latin America in 2008 allegedly paid for by the company – were dismissed, with the judge finding no evidence to support three other charges.

Adolfo Gacio, PP mayor of Boqueixón since 1991, resigned after being arrested in September 2012. Charged with bribery and corruption, he was bailed on a €10,000 bond.

=== Other parts ===
De Lara alleged that Aquagest, a water company, gained contracts from municipalities in Galicia, Asturias, the Region of Murcia and the Valencian Community through bribery and corruption. In July 2015, she sent the case to be presided over by the Audiencia Nacional, who sent it back to her. She went to the Supreme Court, who confirmed that she should preside over all aspects relating to Galicia, and parts relating to other regions should be sent to their courts.

De Lara alleged that a €29 million catering contract for the company GRS in the Catalan comarca of Selva was bought through bribery. The file on this was rejected by the judge in Santa Coloma de Farners for being outside of its area, and De Lara again went to the Supreme Court to resolve the jurisdiction.

An investigation into bribery by Aquagest and GRS in Avilés was returned to De Lara by the city's court, who believed that it was a case for the provincial court and that too much time had elapsed since the alleged crimes.

De Lara investigated alleged corruption by the municipality of Santiago de Compostela including in the allocation of contracts and the funding of the local People's Party. The file was sent to the city's court in 2018, but was sent back to Lugo because it was considered to be unclear due to the time lapse since the alleged crimes. The question of which court would preside over the case then went to the Supreme Court. A similar investigation into the funding of the city's PSOE was rejected due to the time lapse as well.

Argimirio Marnotes, the PP mayor of O Carballiño was investigated for giving a contract to a weeding company run by a beneficiary of Fernández Liñares. The case was closed for lack of evidence in June 2015. He had lost re-election days earlier due to the charge.
