= Reagrupament =

Independentist Rally Reagrupament Independentista
- President: Joan Carretero
- Founded: 3 October 2009
- Split from: Republican Left of Catalonia
- Headquarters: Carrer Malgrat, 93; Barcelona
- Ideology: Catalan independentism Republicanism
- Regional affiliation: Democracy and Freedom (2015–2016); Junts (since 2020)
- Colours: Light brown

Website
- www.reagrupament.cat

Reagrupament or Reagrupament Independentista (lit. 'Independentist Rally') is an association in Catalonia, Spain, formally constituted on 3 October 2009. It is an umbrella group for various supporters of Catalan independence and the creation of a sovereign state for Catalonia. It has no representation in the Catalan Parliament.

It was formed in July 2007 as a critical current within the Republican Left of Catalonia (ERC) by members who opposed the party's alliance with two other leftist, but non-independentist parties, the Socialists' Party of Catalonia (PSC) and the Iniciativa per Catalunya Verds (ICV). In 2009, they founded a new political platform, which was later re-organized as a political party.

Reagrupament's strategic aims are a democratic regeneration of Catalonia and the unilateral declaration of independence of the region by the Parliament of Catalonia.

In 2010, Reagrupament negotiated an electoral alliance with the Catalan Solidarity for Independence, led by Joan Laporta. Despite a common aim - the independence of Catalonia - and a similar ideological background, the negotiations failed due to divergences in mid-term strategy and disagreements over the compilation of electoral lists.

In the 2010 parliamentary election in Catalonia, Reagrupament gained 1.28% of the vote and no seats in parliament. It had the best results in the Circumscription of Girona with 3.28%, and the worst in the Circumscription of Tarragona with 0.93%.

Reagrupament is led by Joan Carretero and Rut Carandell and its slogan is Independence and Democracy.

In the 2015 general election, the party is a member of the Democracy and Freedom coalition.
