= Catalan independence movement =

Independence movement in Europe

Left: Blue estelada (estelada blava), created at the beginning of the 20th century, is the most representative pro-independence symbol. Right: the Red estelada (estelada vermella) appeared in 1968, generally associated with the left-wing and socialist branch of the independence movement

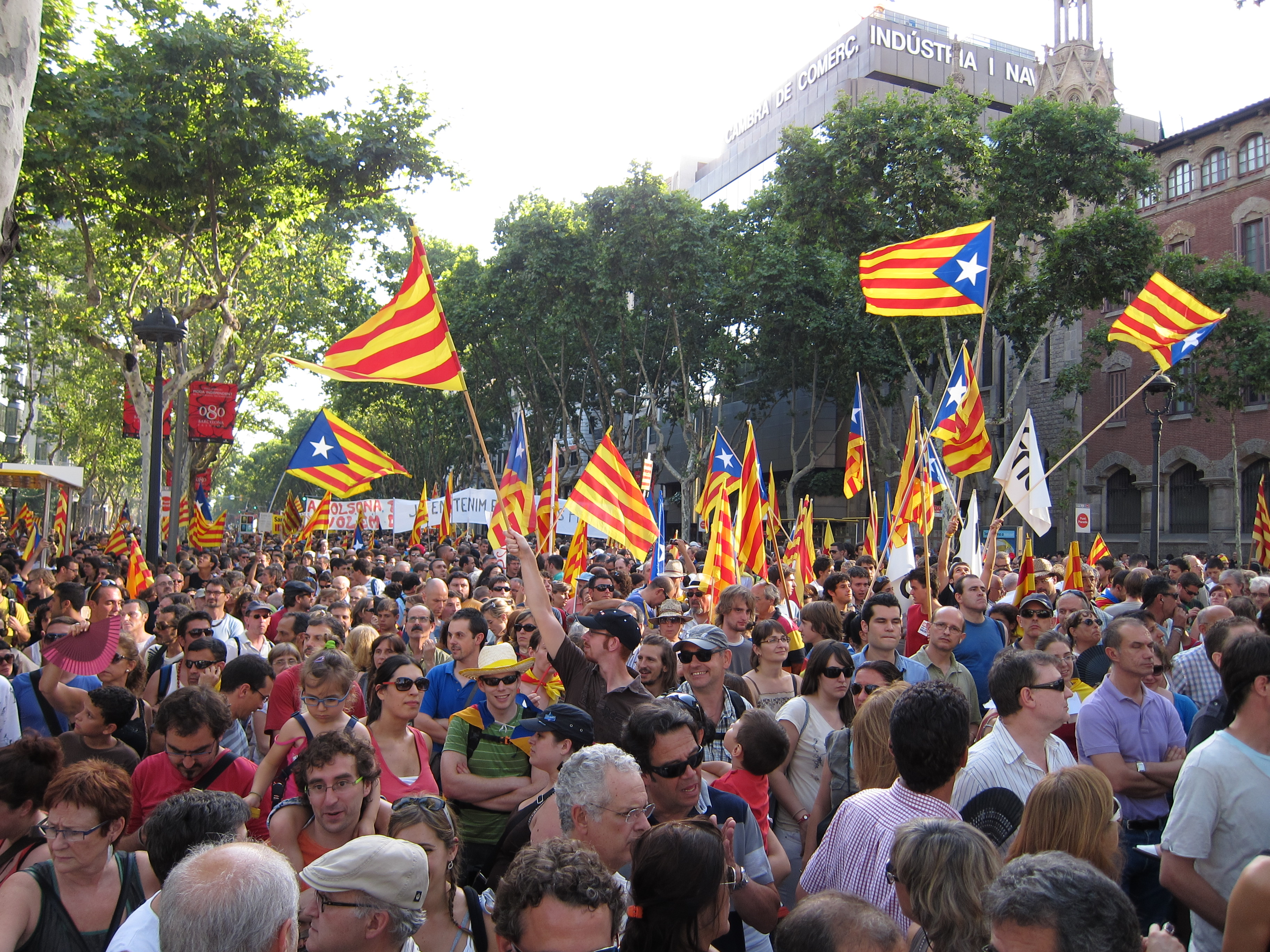
A Catalan independence protest in July 2010

The Catalan independence movement (Catalan: independentisme català; (Note: Pronunciation of independentisme català in Catalan: [indəpəndənˈtizmə kətəˈla] Regional variants: Eastern Catalan: [indəpəndənˈtizmə kətəˈɫa] Western Catalan (including Valencian): [independenˈtizme kataˈla]) Spanish: independentismo catalán; Occitan: independentisme catalan) is a social and political movement with roots in Catalan nationalism that seeks the independence of Catalonia from Spain and the establishment of a new Catalan Republic.

While proposals, organizations and individuals advocating for Catalan independence or the restitution of statehood for the Principality of Catalonia existed through the 18th and 19th centuries, the beginnings of the independence movement in Catalonia can be traced back to regionalism and Catalan nationalism from the mid–19th century, influenced by romantic ideas widespread in Europe at the time. The first relevant organised Catalan independence party was Estat Català ("Catalan State"), founded in 1922 by Francesc Macià. In 1931, Estat Català and other parties formed Esquerra Republicana de Catalunya ("Republican Left of Catalonia", ERC). Macià proclaimed a Catalan Republic within an Iberian Federation in 1931, subsequently accepting autonomy within the Spanish Republic after negotiations with the leaders of the provisional Spanish Republican government. During the Spanish Civil War, General Francisco Franco abolished Catalan autonomy in 1938. Following Franco's death in 1975, Catalan political parties concentrated on the recovery and further increase of autonomy rather than independence, which was restricted to extraparliamentary Marxist organizations and internal factions of mainstream parties.

The contemporary independence movement began around 2009 after a series of events, including the 2008 financial crisis and the Partido Popular (People's Party) challenging the 2006 Statute of Autonomy in the Constitutional Court of Spain; Catalan municipalities held symbolic referendums on independence between 2009 and 2011. The 2010 ruling of the court that parts of the statute were unconstitutional sparked huge protests, and a snap election in 2012 led to the first pro-independence majority ever in the Catalan parliament. The new government held a "non-binding" self-determination referendum in 2014, which yielded a large majority in favour of independence, but with a low turnout due to boycotting by anti-independence voters. A further election in 2015 was followed by the calling of a new, binding referendum. This was however considered illegal by the Spanish government and the Constitutional Court, as the Catalan government lacks legal jurisdiction to organize referendums. The referendum was nonetheless held in 2017 amidst great political and social controversy including police violence aimed at stopping it both before and during the voting. Amidst large protests from both the pro- and anti-independence camps, the Catalan parliament approved a motion with the aim to proclaim an independent republic. At the same time, the Spanish senate voted to take control of the Catalan institutions until new regional elections. The autonomous government leaders were arrested in the subsequent weeks with some fleeing abroad including then-president Carles Puigdemont. In 2019, the new Spanish government agreed to hold a 'table of negotiations' with the government of Catalonia, though refusing beforehand to consider independence or self-determination. In 2020, the Spanish government began processing a request for the pardon of the arrested leaders, which was effective in June 2021.

In the Parliament of Catalonia, parties explicitly supporting independence are Together for Catalonia (Junts), heir of the former Democratic Convergence of Catalonia (CDC); Republican Left of Catalonia (ERC), Popular Unity Candidacy (CUP) and Catalan Alliance. Parties opposed to the Catalan independence are the People's Party (PP), the Socialists' Party of Catalonia (PSC) and Vox. Catalunya en Comú (Comuns) supports federalism and a legal and agreed referendum.

== History ==
=== Principality of Catalonia ===
Iberian Kingdoms in 1400

The Principality of Catalonia was a state of the composite monarchy known as Crown of Aragon. The Principality was the result of the absorption or vassalization by the County of Barcelona of the other Catalan counties (such as the counties of Girona, Osona, Urgell or Rousillon), while the Crown was created by the dynastic union of the County of Barcelona and the Kingdom of Aragon in 1137. In the late 15th century, Aragon united by marriage with the Crown of Castile to form what would later become the Monarchy of Spain. Initially, the various polities of the Crown of Aragon, including the Principality of Catalonia, kept their own laws and customs, known as Constitutions, equivalent in the other kingdoms to the fueros (furs in Catalan), and political institutions such as the General Court of Catalonia and the Generalitat as a guarantee of their sovereignty and jurisdiction, for which they fought a civil war during the actual union of the crowns, known as the Catalan Civil War (1462–1472) between foralists and royalists. In 1640, during the Thirty Years War and Franco-Spanish War, Catalan peasants and institutions revolted, starting the Reapers' War. The following year, the Catalan government seceded, establishing the independence of the Principality as a Catalan Republic, called France for protection and finally named Louis XIII count of Barcelona. After a decade of war, the Spanish Monarchy counter-attacked in 1652 and recovered Barcelona and the rest of Catalonia, except for Roussillon, which was annexed by France. Catalonia retained its Constitutions.

During the War of the Spanish Succession, most of the territories of the Crown of Aragon, including the Principality of Catalonia, fiercely supported Archduke Charles, the Habsburg contender, who swore the Constitutions of Catalonia, against the Bourbon contender, who would later abolish the constitutions and political institutions through the Nueva Planta Decrees. The Habsburgs' English allies withdrew from the war with the Treaty of Utrecht in 1713, and shortly thereafter, Habsburg troops were evacuated from Italy and from Spain. This left the Catalan government isolated, but it remained loyal to Charles and unilaterally declared the war to Philip V and the Kingdom of France. After a 14-month siege, Barcelona capitulated to a Bourbon army on 11 September 1714. 11 September, the date of the fall of Barcelona, was commemorated by Catalan nationalists from 1886, and in the 20th century it was chosen as the National Day of Catalonia.

After the War of the Spanish Succession, based on the political position of the Count-Duke of Olivares and the absolutism of Philip V, the assimilation of the Crown of Aragon by the Castilian Crown through the Nueva Planta decrees was the first step in the creation of the Spanish nation-state, with a centralised Spanish government. Like other contemporary European states, political union is the first step in the creation of the Spanish nation-state, in this case not on a uniform ethnic basis, but through the imposition of the political and cultural characteristics of the dominant ethnic group. in this case the Castilians, over those of other ethnic groups, become national minorities to be assimilated. In fact, since the political unification of 1714, Spanish assimilation policies towards Catalan-speaking territories (Catalonia, Valencia, the Balearic Islands, part of Aragon) and other national minorities have been a historical constant.

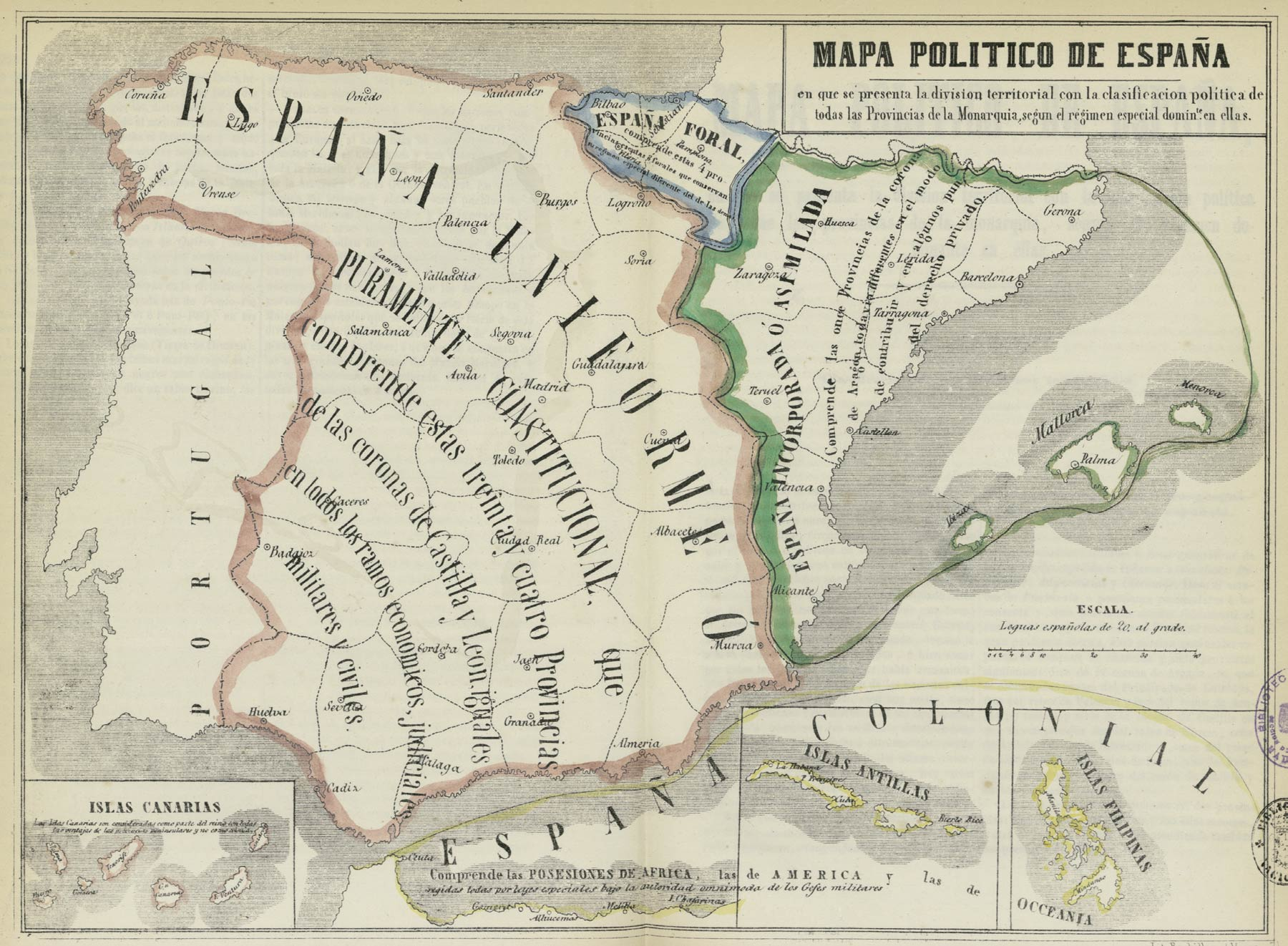
School map of Spain from 1850. The Spanish State is divided into four parts: The fully constitutional Spain, that includes most of the former Crown of Castile; Assimilated Spain: territories from the former Crown of Aragon, including most Catalan-speaking areas; Foral Spain, which includes the Basque-speaking territories; and Colonial Spain, with the remaining colonial territories for that year.

It begins with secret instructions to the corregidores of the Catalan territory: "will take the utmost care to introduce the Castilian language, for which purpose he will give the most temperate and disguised measures so that the effect is achieved, without the care being noticed", and from there the actions, discreet or aggressive, are continued, and reach the last detail, such as, in 1799, the Royal Certificate prohibiting "represent, sing and dance pieces that were not in Spanish." These nationalist policies, sometimes very aggressive, and still in force, have been and still are the seed of repeated territorial conflicts within the State.

=== Nineteenth and twentieth century ===
Although since its loss there were claims to recover the Constitutions, the beginnings of separatism in Catalonia can be traced back to the mid–19th century. The Renaixença (cultural renaissance), which aimed at the revival of the Catalan language and Catalan traditions, led to the development of Catalan nationalism and a desire for self-government, through a Spanish federal republic or even the independence. Between the 1850s and the 1910s, some individuals, organisations and political parties started demanding full independence of Catalonia from Spain.

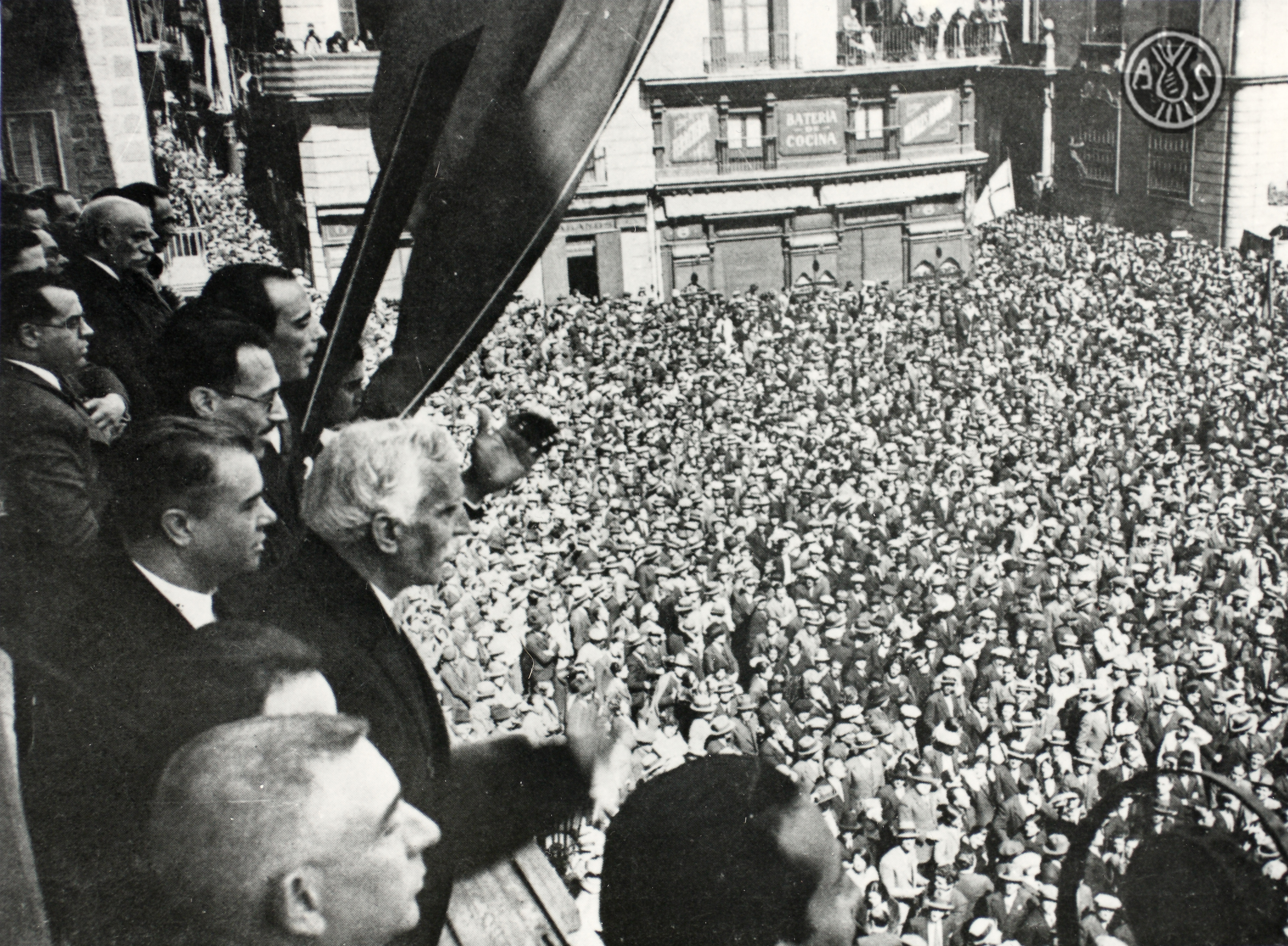
Francesc Macià, leader of ERC and President of Catalonia between 1931 and 1933, proclaiming the Catalan Republic on 14 April 1931

The first pro-independence political party in Catalonia was Estat Català (Catalan State), founded in 1922 by Francesc Macià. Estat Català went into exile in France during the dictatorship of Primo de Rivera (1923–1930), launching an unsuccessful uprising from Prats de Molló (Northern Catalonia, France) in 1926. In March 1931, following the overthrow of Primo de Rivera, Estat Català joined with the Partit Republicà Català (Catalan Republican Party) and the political group L'Opinió ("The Opinion") to form Esquerra Republicana de Catalunya ("Republican Left of Catalonia"; ERC), with Macià as its first leader. The following month, the ERC achieved a spectacular victory in the municipal elections that preceded the 14 April proclamation of the Second Spanish Republic. Macià proclaimed a Catalan Republic on 14 April, but after negotiations with the provisional government he was obliged to settle for autonomy, under a revived Generalitat of Catalonia. Catalonia was granted a statute of autonomy in 1932, which lasted until the Spanish Civil War. In 1938, General Franco abolished both the Statute of Autonomy and the Generalitat.

A section of Estat Català which had broken away from the ERC in 1936 joined with other groups to found the Front Nacional de Catalunya (National Front of Catalonia; FNC) in Paris in 1940. The FNC declared its aim to be "an energetic protest against Franco and an affirmation of Catalan nationalism". Its impact, however, was on Catalan exiles in France rather than in Catalonia itself. The FNC in turn gave rise to the Partit Socialista d'Alliberament Nacional (Socialist Party of National Liberation; PSAN), which combined a pro-independence agenda with a left-wing stance. A split in the PSAN led to the formation of the Partit Socialista d'Alliberament Nacional - Provisional (Socialist Party of National Liberation – Provisional; PSAN-P) in 1974.

Following Franco's death in 1975, Spain moved to restore democracy. A new constitution was adopted in 1978, which asserted the "indivisible unity of the Spanish Nation", but acknowledged "the right to autonomy of the nationalities and regions which form it". Independence parties objected to it on the basis that it was incompatible with Catalan self-determination, and formed the Comité Català Contra la Constitució Espanyola (Catalan Committee Against the Spanish Constitution) to oppose it. The constitution was approved in a referendum by 88% of voters in Spain overall, and just over 90% in Catalonia. It was followed by the Statute of Autonomy of Catalonia of 1979, which was approved in a referendum, with 88% of voters supporting it. This led to the marginalisation or disappearance of pro-independence political groups, and for a time the gap was filled by militant groups such as Terra Lliure.

In 1981, a manifesto issued by intellectuals in Catalonia claiming discrimination against the Castilian language, drew a response in the form of published letter, Crida a la Solidaritat en Defensa de la Llengua, la Cultura i la Nació Catalanes ("Call for Solidarity in Defence of the Catalan Language, Culture and Nation"), which called for a mass meeting at the University of Barcelona, out of which a popular movement arose. The Crida organised a series of protests that culminated in a massive demonstration in the Camp Nou on 24 June 1981. Beginning as a cultural organisation, the Crida soon began to demand independence. In 1982, at a time of political uncertainty in Spain, the Ley Orgánica de Armonización del Proceso Autonómico (LOAPA) was introduced in the Spanish parliament, supposedly to "harmonise" the autonomy process, but in reality to curb the power of Catalonia and the Basque region. There was a surge of popular protest against it. The Crida and others organised a huge rally against LOAPA in Barcelona on 14 March 1982. In March 1983, it was held to be ultra vires by the Spanish Constitutional Court. During the 1980s, the Crida was involved in nonviolent direct action, among other things campaigning for labelling in Catalan only, and targeting big companies. In 1983, the Crida's leader, Àngel Colom, left to join the ERC, "giving an impulse to the independentist refounding" of that party.

In 1992 the police operation known as "Operation Garzón" saw the arrest of 45 Catalan pro-independence activists and politicians on the eve of the Summer Olympics held in Barcelona, under the accusation to be members of Terra Lliure without real proof. 25 of the arrested were kept in solitary confinement. They denounced torture at the hands of the Spanish police and threats of violence and rape to them and their families, as well as constant anti-Catalan insults.

=== Second Statute of Autonomy and after ===
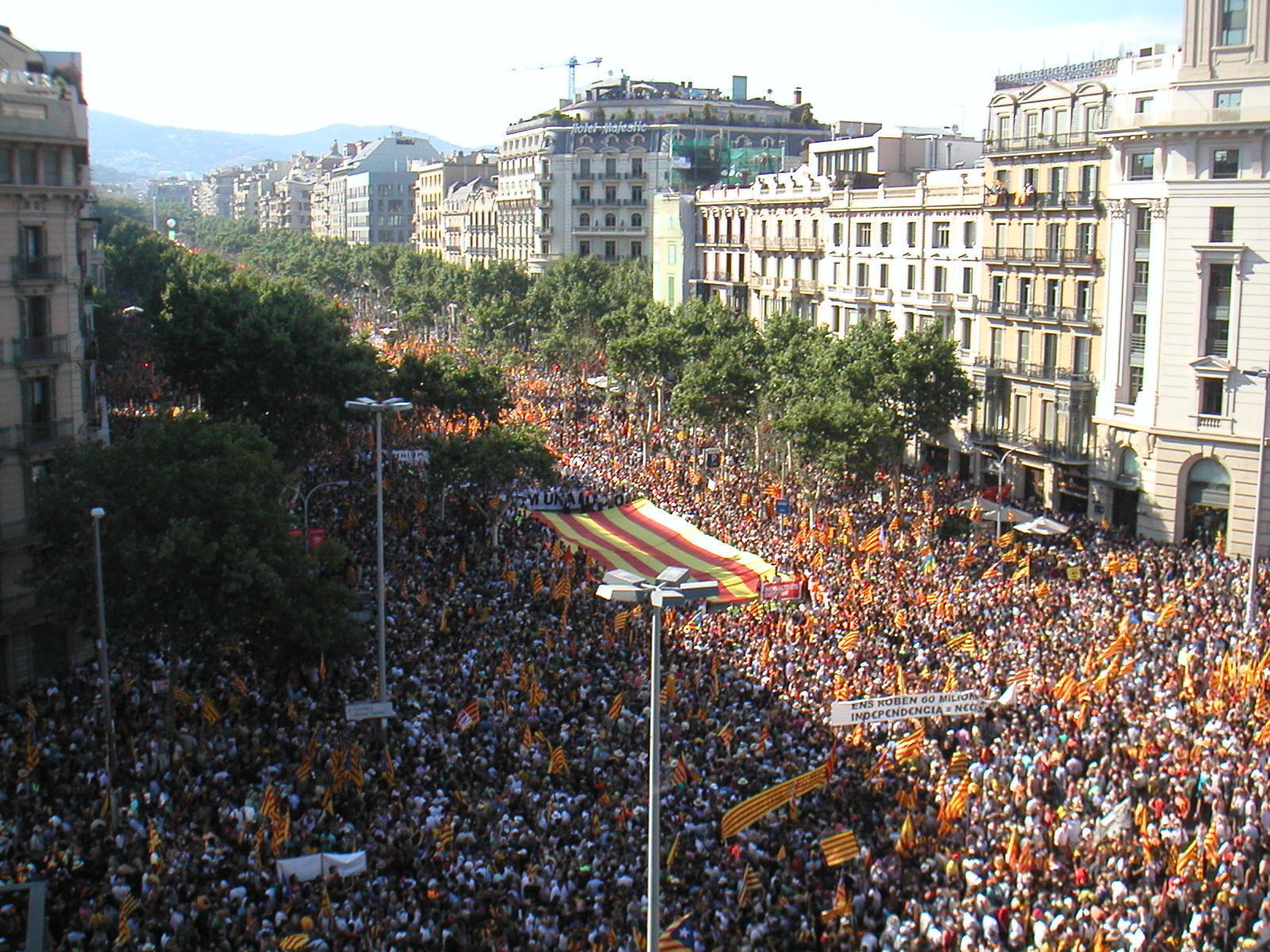
The 2010 Catalan autonomy protest in the intersection of Passeig de Gràcia and Aragó Avenues, in Barcelona

Following elections in 2003, the moderate nationalist Convergència i Unió (CiU), which had governed Catalonia since 1980, lost power to a coalition of left-wing parties composed of the Socialists' Party of Catalonia (PSC), the pro-independence Esquerra Republicana de Catalunya (ERC) and a far-left/Green coalition (ICV–EUiA), headed by Pasqual Maragall. The government produced a draft for a new Statute of Autonomy, which was supported by the CiU and was approved by the parliament by a large majority. The draft statute then had to be approved by the Spanish parliament, which could make changes; it did so, removing clauses on finance and the language, and an article stating that Catalonia was a nation. When the amended statute was put to a referendum on 18 June 2006, the ERC, in protest, called for a "no" vote. The statute was approved, but turnout was only 48.9%. At the subsequent election, the left-wing coalition was returned to power, this time under the leadership of José Montilla.

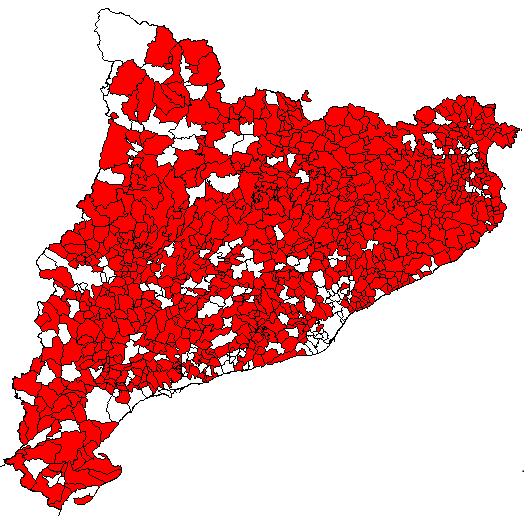
Municipalities supporting the Association of Municipalities for Independence

In November 2005, Omnium Cultural organized a meeting of Catalan and Madrid intellectuals in the Círculo de bellas artes in Madrid to show support for ongoing reform of Catalan Statute of Autonomy, which sought to resolve territorial tensions, and among other things better protect the Catalan language. On the Catalan side, a flight was made with one hundred representatives of the cultural, civic, intellectual, artistic and sporting world of Catalonia, but on the Spanish side, except Santiago Carrillo, a politician from the Second Republic, did not attend any more. The subsequent failure of the statutory reform with respect to its objectives opened the door to the growth of Catalan sovereignty.

The conservative Partido Popular, which had opposed the statute in the Spanish parliament, challenged its constitutionality in the Constitutional Court. The case lasted four years. In its judgement, issued on 18 June 2010, the court ruled that fourteen articles in the statute were unconstitutional, and that 27 others were to be interpreted restrictively. The affected articles included those that reinforced the status of the Catalan language, freed Catalonia from responsibility for the finances of other autonomous communities, added the Catalan historical rights as one of the basis of self-government, and recognised Catalonia as a nation. The full text of the judgement was released on 9 July 2010, and the following day a protest demonstration organised by the cultural organisation Òmnium Cultural was attended by over a million people, and led by José Montilla.

During and after the court case, a series of symbolic referendums on independence were held in municipalities throughout Catalonia. The first of these was in the town of Arenys de Munt on 13 September 2009. About 40% of eligible voters participated, of whom 96% voted for independence. In all, 552 towns held independence referendums between 2009 and 2011. These, together with demonstrations organised by Òmnium Cultural and the Assemblea Nacional Catalana (ANC), represented a "bottom-up" process by which society influenced the political movement for independence. At an institutional level, several municipalities of Catalonia came together to create the Association of Municipalities for Independence, an organisation officially established on 14 December 2011 in Vic which brought local organisations together to further the national rights of Catalonia and promote its right to self-determination. The demonstration of 11 September 2012 explicitly called on the Catalan government to begin the process of secession. Immediately after it, Artur Mas, whose CiU had regained power in 2010, called a snap election for 25 November 2012, and the parliament resolved that a referendum on independence would be held in the life of the next legislature. Although the CiU lost seats to the ERC, Mas remained in power.

=== 2014 Referendum ===
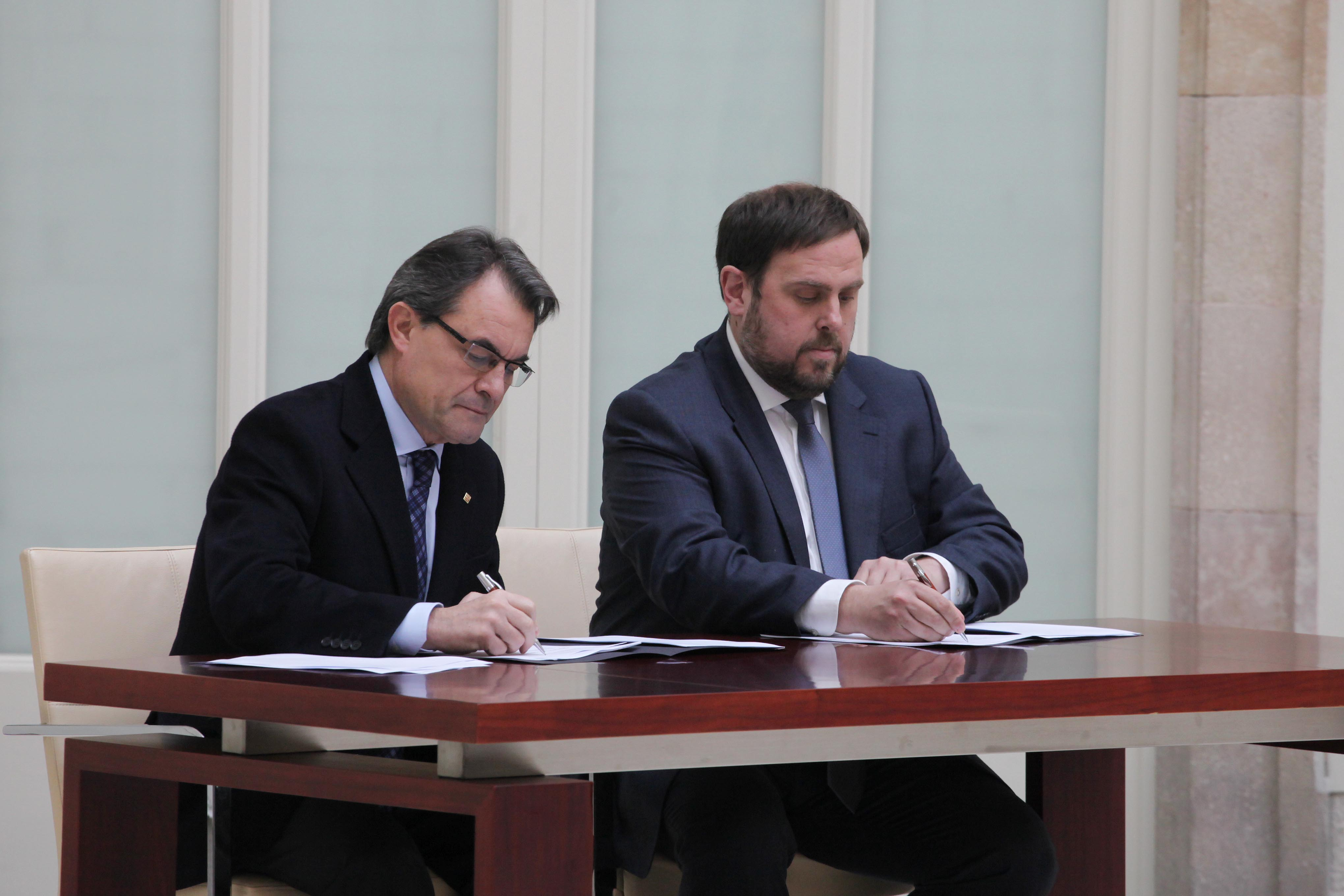
Artur Mas and Oriol Junqueras, signing the 2012–2016 governability agreement on 19 December 2012

Mas and ERC leader Oriol Junqueras signed an agreement by which the ERC would support the CiU on sovereignty issues while on other matters it might oppose it. The two leaders drafted the Declaration of Sovereignty and of the Right to Decide of the Catalan People, which was adopted by the parliament at its first sitting in January 2013. The declaration stated that "the Catalan people have, for reasons of democratic legitimacy, the nature of a sovereign political and legal subject", and that the people had the right to decide their own political future.

The Spanish government referred the declaration to the Spanish Constitutional Court, which ruled in March 2014 that the declaration of sovereignty was unconstitutional. The court did not, however, reject the "right to decide", arguing that that right didn't necessarily imply sovereignty or self-determination.

On 11 September 2013, an estimated 1.6 million demonstrators formed a human chain, the Catalan Way, from the French border to the regional border with Valencia.

The following month, the CiU, the ERC, the ICV-EUiA and Candidatura d'Unitat Popular (CUP) agreed to hold the independence referendum on 9 November 2014, and that it would ask two questions: "Do you want Catalonia to become a State?" and (if yes) "Do you want this State to be independent?". A further mass demonstration, the Catalan Way 2014, took place on 11 September 2014, when protesters wearing the Catalan colours of yellow and red filled two of Barcelona's avenues to form a giant "V", to call for a vote. Following the Constitutional Court's ruling, the Catalan government changed the vote to a "process of citizen participation" and announced that it would be supervised by volunteers. The Spanish government again appealed to the Constitutional Court, which suspended the process pending the appeal, but the vote went ahead. The result was an 81% vote for yes-yes, but the turnout was only 42%, which could be seen as a majority opposed to both independence and the referendum. Criminal charges were subsequently brought against Mas and others for defying the court order.

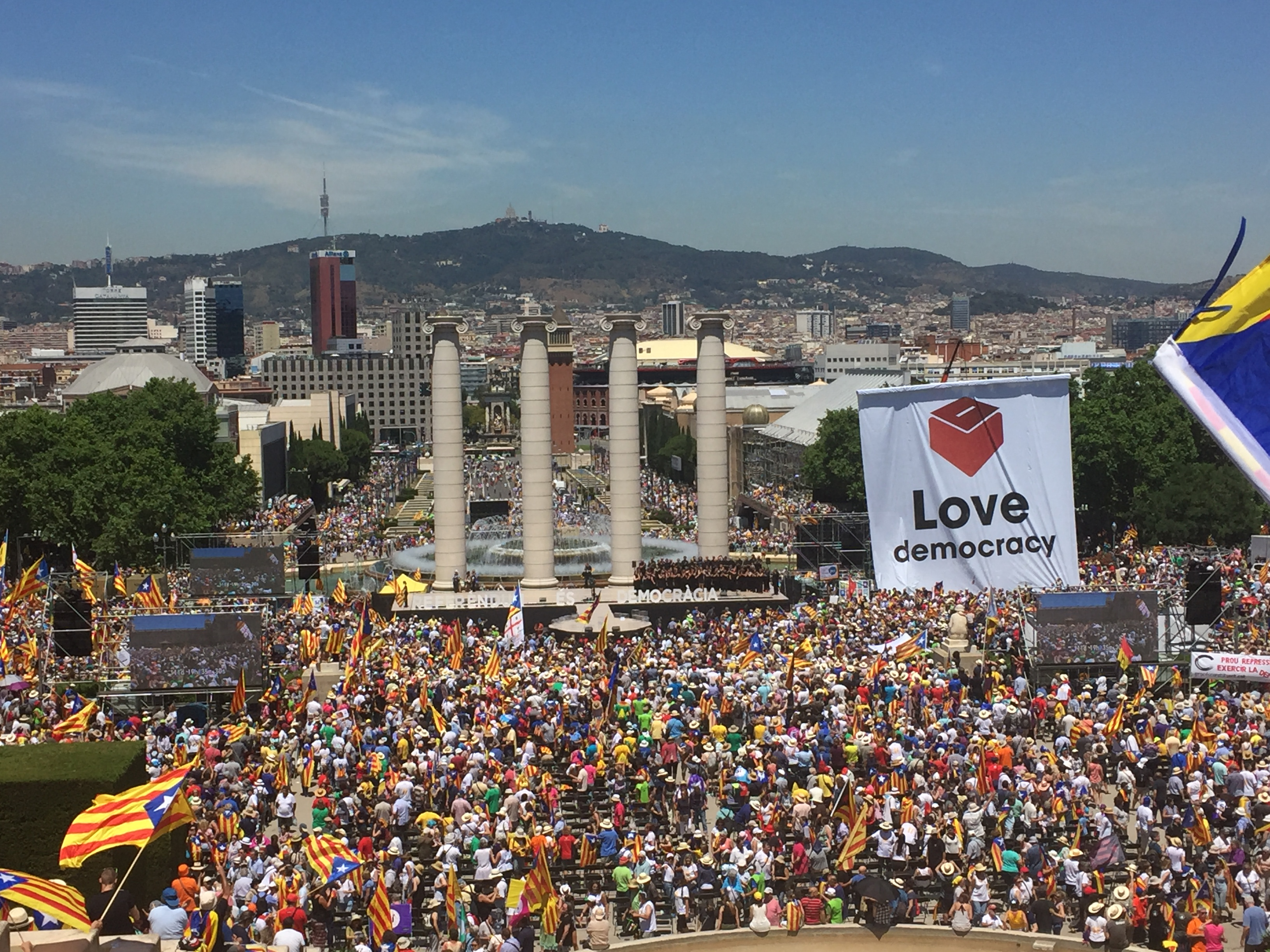
Pro-referendum rally in Montjuic, 11 June 2017

In June 2015 the CiU broke up as a result of disagreement between its constituent parties – Convergència Democràtica de Catalunya (CDC) and Unió Democràtica de Catalunya (UDC) – over the independence process. Mas's CDC joined with the ERC and other groups to form Junts pel Sí (Together for "Yes"), which announced that it would declare independence if it won the election scheduled for September. In the September election, Junts pel Sí and the CUP between them won a majority of seats, but fell short of a majority of votes, with just under 48%. On 9 November 2015, the parliament passed a resolution declaring the start of the independence process, proposed by Junts pel Sí and the CUP. In response, Spanish Prime Minister Mariano Rajoy said that the state would "use any available judicial and political mechanism contained in the constitution and in the laws to defend the sovereignty of the Spanish people and of the general interest of Spain", a hint that he would not stop at military intervention. Following prolonged negotiations between Junts pel Sí and the CUP, Mas was replaced as president by Carles Puigdemont in January 2016. Puigdemont, on taking the oath of office, omitted the oath of loyalty to the king and the Spanish constitution, the first Catalan president to do so.

Further pro-independence demonstrations took place in Barcelona in September 2015, and in Barcelona, Berga, Lleida, Salt and Tarragona in September 2016.

=== 2017 Referendum, Declaration of Independence and new regional elections ===
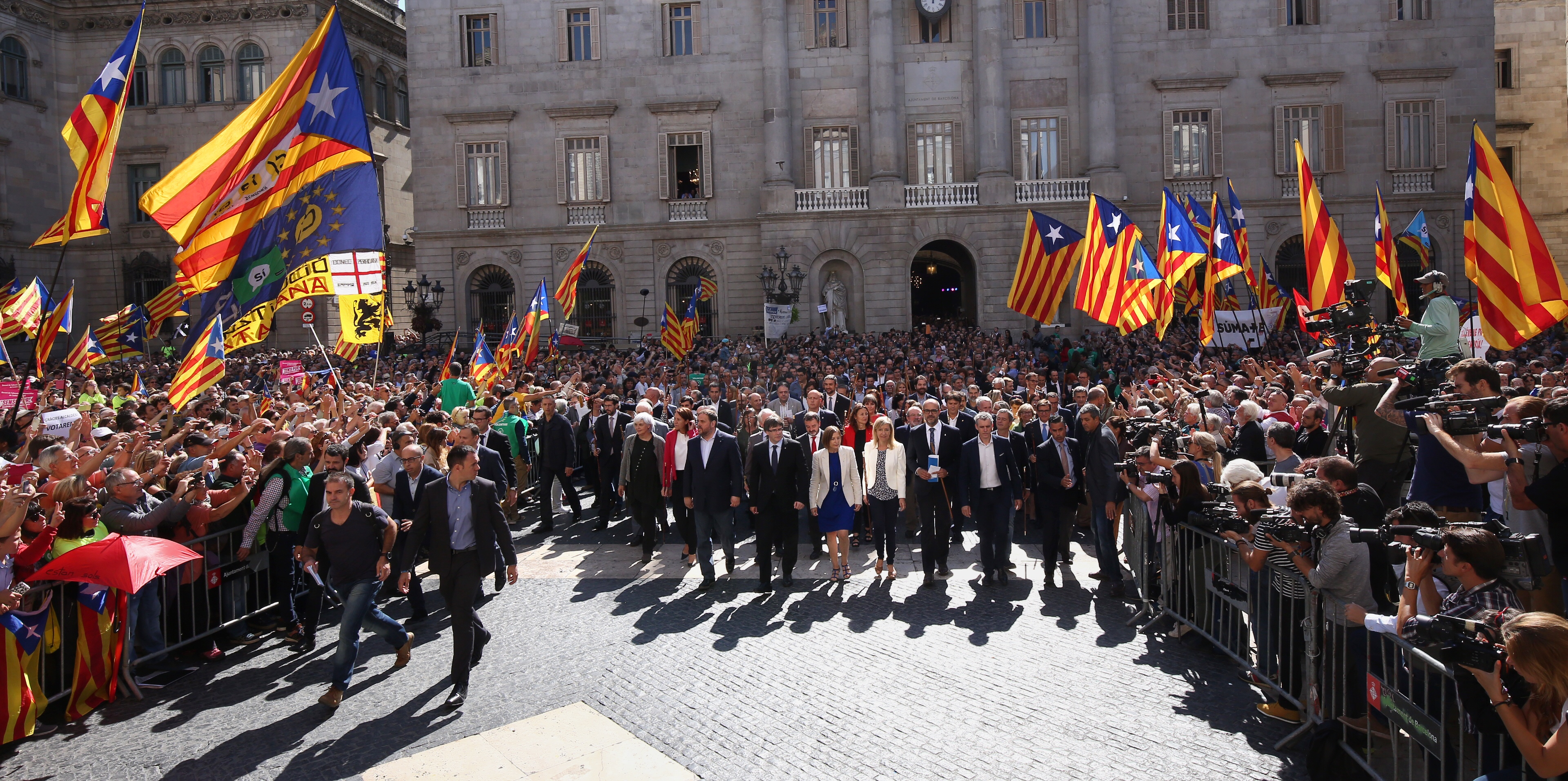
Catalan President Carles Puigdemont and over 700 mayors from Catalonia meeting to support an independence referendum, September 2017

In late September 2016, Puigdemont told the parliament that a binding referendum on independence would be held in the second half of September 2017, with or without the consent of the Spanish institutions. Puigdemont announced in June 2017 that the referendum would take place on 1 October, and that the question would be, "Do you want Catalonia to become an independent state in the form of a republic?" The Spanish government said in response, "that referendum will not take place because it is illegal."

A law creating an independent republic—in the event that the referendum took place and there was a majority "yes" vote, without requiring a minimum turnout—was approved by the Catalan parliament in a session on 6 September 2017. Opposition parties protested against the bill, calling it "a blow to democracy and a violation of the rights of the opposition", and staged a walkout before the vote was taken. On 7 September, the Catalan parliament passed a "transition law", to provide a legal framework pending the adoption of a new constitution, after similar protests and another walkout by opposition parties. The same day, 7 September, the Spanish Constitutional Court suspended the 6 September law while it considered an appeal from Mariano Rajoy, seeking a declaration that it was in breach of the Spanish constitution, meaning that the referendum could not legally go ahead on 1 October. The law was finally declared void on 17 October and is also illegal according to the Catalan Statutes of Autonomy which require a two-thirds majority in the Catalan parliament for any change to Catalonia's status.

The national government seized ballot papers and cell phones, threatened to fine people who staffed the polling stations up to €300,000, shut down web sites, and demanded that Google remove a voting location finder from the Android app store. Police were sent from the rest of Spain to suppress the vote and close polling locations, but parents scheduled events at schools (where polling places are located) over the weekend and vowed to occupy them to keep them open during the vote. Some election organizers were arrested, including Catalan cabinet officials, while demonstrations by local institutions and street protests grew larger.

The referendum took place on 1 October 2017, despite being suspended by the Constitutional Court, and despite the action of Spanish police to prevent voting in some centres. Images of violence from Spanish riot police beating Catalan voters shocked people and human rights organizations across the globe and resulted in hundreds of injured citizens according to Catalan government officials. Some foreign politicians, including the former Belgian Prime-Minister Charles Michel, condemned violence and called for dialogue. According to the Catalan authorities, 90% of voters supported independence, but turnout was only 43%, and there were reports of irregularities. On 10 October 2017, in the aftermath of the referendum, the President of the Generalitat of Catalonia, Carles Puigdemont, declared the independence of Catalonia but left it suspended. Puigdemont said during his appearance in the Catalan parliament that he assumes, in presenting the results of the referendum, "the people's mandate for Catalonia to become an independent state in the form of a republic", but proposed that in the following weeks the parliament "suspends the effect of the declaration of independence to engage in a dialogue to reach an agreed solution" with the Spanish Government.

On 25 October 2017, after the Spanish government had threatened to suspend the Catalan autonomy through article 155 of the Spanish constitution, the UN Independent expert on the promotion of a democratic and equitable international order, Alfred de Zayas, deplored the decision to suspend Catalan autonomy, stating "This action constitutes retrogression in human rights protection, incompatible with Articles 1, 19, 25 and 27 of the International Covenant on Civil and Political Rights (ICCPR). Pursuant to Articles 10(2) and 96 of the Spanish Constitution, international treaties constitute the law of the land and, therefore, Spanish law must be interpreted in conformity with international treaties."

On 27 October 2017 the Catalan Parliament voted in a secret ballot to approve a resolution declaring independence from Spain by a vote of 70–10 in the absence of the constitutionalist deputies, who refused to participate in a vote considered illegal for violating the decisions of the Constitutional Court of Spain.

As a result, the same day (27 October 2017) Article 155 of the Spanish constitution was triggered by the Spanish government; the Catalan government was dismissed and direct rule was imposed from the central government in Madrid.

Under direct rule from Spain, elections were held in Catalonia on 21 December 2017. The three pro-independence parties retained their control of parliament with a reduced majority of 70 seats and a combined 47.5% of valid votes cast. Inés Arrimadas' anti-independence Ciudadanos party was the most voted party with 25.4% of votes, the first time in Catalan history that a non-nationalist party won most votes and seats in an election. Parties which endorsed the suspension of autonomy by central government represented 43.5% of votes cast and parties which did not include independence in their electoral program amounted to 52.5% of the vote, notably Catcomu-Podem (7.5% of votes and 8 seats), which is opposed to independence but supports a legal referendum and denounced the suspension of autonomy. The excellent performance of the centre-right parties on both sides of the independence debate, Ciudadanos and Juntxcat, and the underperformance of all other parties (notably, left wing parties and the Partido Popular) were the most significant factor in this election result.

=== The trial of Catalonia independence leaders and October 2019 protests ===
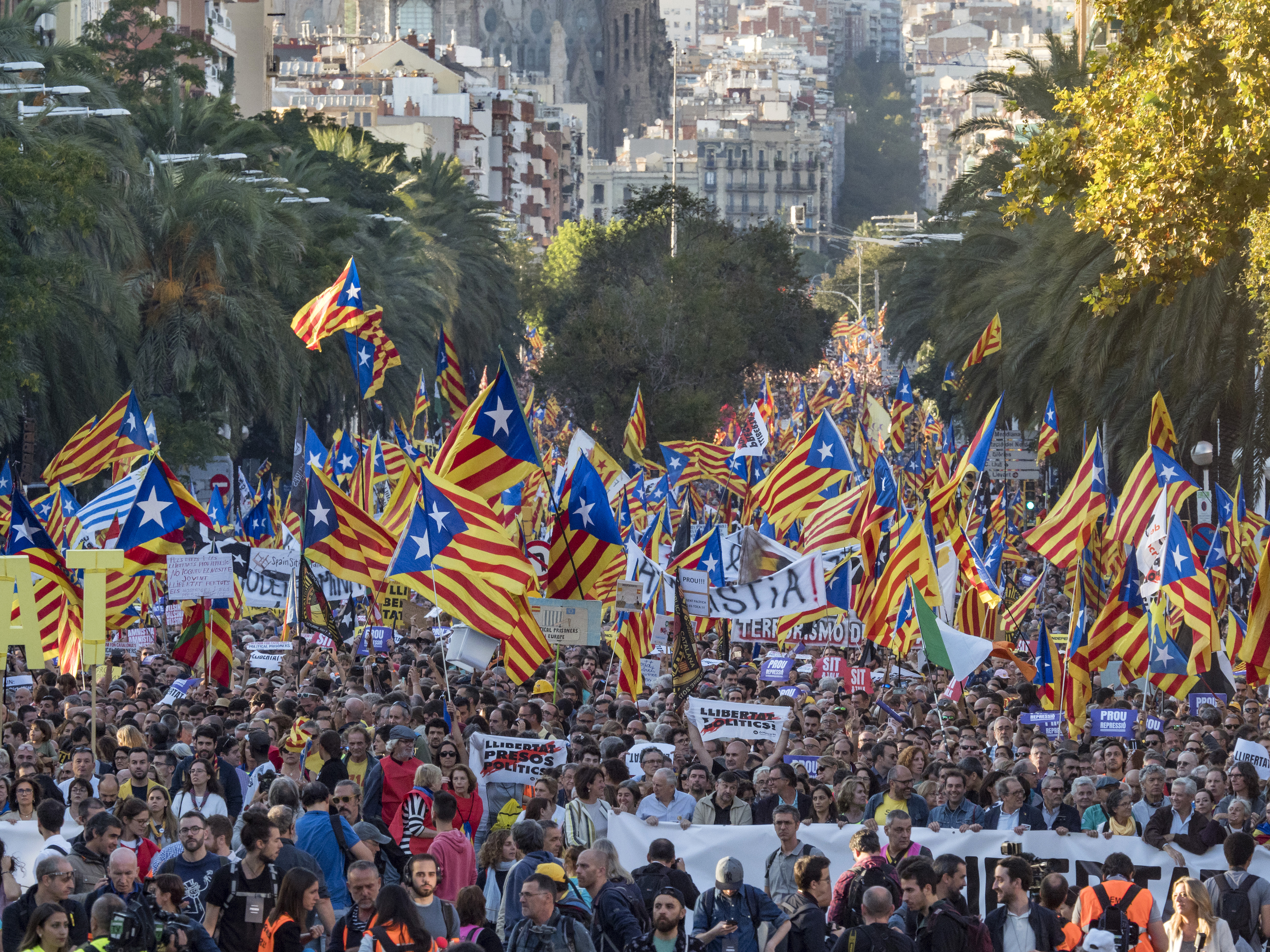
Protest in Barcelona in October 2019

In 2018 some of the independence leaders were sent to preventive detention without bail, accused of crimes of rebellion, disobedience, and misuse of public funds. Carles Puigdemont and four members of his cabinet fled into self-exile.

Twelve people were tried by the Supreme Court of Spain, including the previous vice president Oriol Junqueras of the regional government and most of the cabinet as well as political activists Jordi Sànchez and Jordi Cuixart and the former Speaker of the Parliament of Catalonia Carme Forcadell. The trial proceedings officially ended on 12 June 2019. A unanimous verdict by the seven judges that tried the case was made public on 14 October 2019. Nine of the 12 accused received prison sentences for the crimes of sedition; of them, four were also found guilty of misuse of public funds. Their sentences ranged from 9 to 13 years. The remaining three accused were found guilty of disobedience and were sentenced to pay a fine but received no prison term. The court dismissed the charges of rebellion. Some of the defendants of the trial have expressed their intention to appeal to the Constitutional Court of Spain and the European Court of Human Rights. The verdict delivered by the Supreme Court sparked multiple protests across the region.

Clashes erupted into open violence, as protesters reacted violently at police efforts to end the demonstration, with some demonstrators setting cars on fire and throwing jars of acid at police officers. The Catalan Law Enforcement agency Mossos d'Esquadra, which had previously been accused of aiding the independence movement, replied by firing tear gas at the demonstrators. The pro-independence speaker of the Catalan Parliament condemned the violent incidents and called for peaceful protests against the ruling. The protests grew larger, as more and more Catalans took to the streets. Some demonstrators attempted to storm buildings belonging to the Spanish Government and clashed with police forces. The Spanish Police announced that 51 protesters had been arrested.

On 17 October, the pro-independence President of the Catalan Autonomous government, Quim Torra, called for an immediate halt to violence and disassociated himself from violent protesters, while at the same time calling for more peaceful protests. Nevertheless, the situation in Barcelona had evolved into open street battles between protesters and police, as both violent demonstrators attacked and provoked police forces, and police officers charged peaceful protesters for their proximity to violent ones.

Several reports claim that the protests and subsequent riots had been infiltrated by Neo-Nazis who used the marches as an opportunity to incite violence.

Shortly thereafter, the Catalan President attempted to rally the crowd by stating that he will push for a new independence referendum as large scale protests continued for the fourth day.

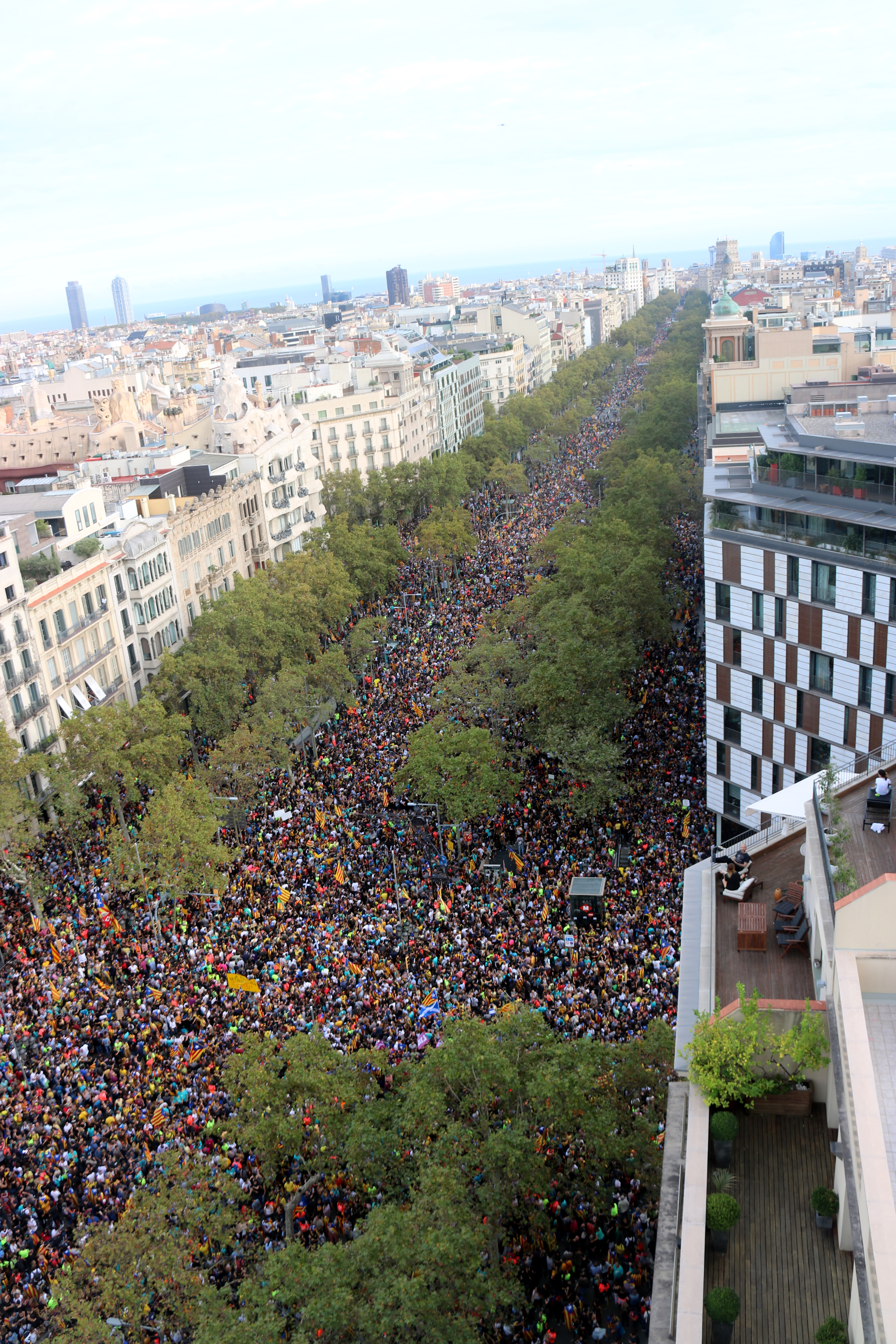
March for Liberty on Passeig de Gràcia, Barcelona on 18 October 2019

On 18 October, Barcelona became paralyzed, as tens of thousands of peaceful protesters answered the Catalan President's call and rallied in support of the jailed independence leaders. The demonstration grew quickly, with the Barcelona police counting at least 525,000 protesters in the city.

By late 18 October, minor trade unions (Intersindical-CSC and Intersindical Alternativa de Catalunya) linked to pro-independence movement called for a general strike. However, major trade unions (UGT and CCOO) did not endorse the event as well as representatives of the latter contested its very nature as "strike". Five peaceful marches converged on Barcelona's city center, essentially bringing the city to a halt. Protesters further blocked the road on the French-Spanish border. At least 20 other major roads were also blocked. Clashes nevertheless took place, with masked protesters confronting riot police by throwing stones and setting alight rubbish bins. 25,000 university students joined in the protest movement by declaring a peaceful student strike.

As a result of the strike, trains and metro lines saw a reduction to 33% of their usual capacity, while buses saw a reduction to 25–50% of their usual capacity. The roads to the French border remained blocked and all roads leading into Barcelona were also cut. 190 flights in and out of the city were cancelled as a result of the strike. Spanish car manufacturer SEAT further announced a halt in the production of its Martorell plant and most of Barcelona's tourist sites had been closed and occupied by pro-independence demonstrators waving Estelada independence flags and posters with pro-independence slogans. The El Clásico football match between FC Barcelona and Real Madrid CF was postponed due to the strike.

By the end of the day, just like the previous days, riots developed in the centre of Barcelona. Masked individuals blocked the boulevard close to the city's police headquarters in Via Laetana. Withdrawn to the vicinity of the Plaça Urquinaona, protesters erected barricades setting trash bins in fire and hurled rubble (debris from broken paving stones) and other solid objects at riot policemen. The riot units responded with non-lethal foam and rubber bullets, tear gas and smoke grenades. The Mossos used for the first time the water cannon trunk acquired in 1994 from Israel in order to make way across the barricades. The clashes spread to cities outside Barcelona, with Spain's acting interior minister stating that 207 policemen had been injured since the start of the protests, while also noting that 128 people had been arrested by the nation's police forces. Miquel Buch, the Catalan Interior Minister, responsible for public order, and a pro-independence politician, called the violence "unprecedented" and distanced himself from the violent events, instead calling for peaceful protests to continue.

On 19 October, following a fifth consecutive night of violence, Catalan President Quim Torra called for talks between the Catalan independence movement and the Spanish government, adding that violence had never been the "flag" of the independence movement. The head of the Spanish Government, Prime Minister Pedro Sánchez, refused to hold talks with the Catalan government, as it deemed the former had not condemned the violence strongly enough. He further categorically rejected the idea of discussing Catalan Independence, stating that it was impossible under Spanish law.

=== 2021 and 2024 elections ===
In the 2021 regional election, which saw a low turnout due to the COVID-19 pandemic, pro-independence parties won over 50% of the popular vote for the first time, and increased their representation in the parliament from 70 to 74 seats. In June 2021, the nine activists who had been jailed in 2019 were released, having been pardoned by King Felipe VI on the advice of Spanish prime minister Pedro Sánchez. In 2024, the Congress of Deputies voted in favour of amnesty for all those involved in the 2017 campaign, including Carles Puigdemont; despite the law being vetoed by the Senate, it was expected to be enacted by the end of May 2024. On May 30, the Spanish Parliament voted 177 to 172 to pass a bill granting amnesty to hundreds of Catalan secessionists involved in the Catalan declaration of independence from 2011 to 2017.

Junts and the ERC split in October 2022, leaving Pere Aragonès leading a minority government. In March 2024 Aragonès called a snap election after his budget was voted down. In that election, the pro-independence parties lost their majority in the parliament for the first time in 10 years. Junts slightly increased their number of seats, but the ERC and CUP lost heavily, meaning the pro-independence were far short of the 68 seats needed to form a government.

== Support for independence ==
=== Pro-independence parties represented in the Catalan Parliament ===
Party		Ideology	Political position	Leader	MPs
Together for Catalonia; Junts per Catalunya	Junts	Populism; Sovereigntism	Centre-right	Josep Rull	35 / 135
Republican Left of Catalonia; Esquerra Republicana de Catalunya	ERC	Social democracy Republicanism; Eco-nationalism; Democratic socialism	Centre-left to left-wing	Oriol Junqueras	20 / 135
Popular Unity Candidacy; Candidatura d'Unitat Popular	CUP	Socialism; Eco-socialism; Pan-Catalanism; Anti-capitalism; Feminism; Euroscepticism	Left-wing to far-left	Laia Estrada	4 / 135
Catalan Alliance; Aliança Catalana	Aliança.cat	Right-wing populism Anti-immigration; Soft Euroscepticism	Far-right	Sílvia Orriols	2 / 135

=== Pro-independence parties in coalition represented in the Catalan Parliament ===
Party		Ideology	Political position	Plattform / Senior party	MPs
Forward–Socialist Organisation of National Liberation; Endavant-Organització Socialista d'Alliberament Nacional	Endavant	Communism; Pan-Catalanism; Socialist feminism Anti-fascism; Anti-capitalism; Euroscepticism	Left-wing to far-left	CUP	2 / 135
Free People; Poble Lliure	PL	Socialism; Pan-Catalanism; Feminism; Anti-fascism	Left-wing to far-left	CUP	2 / 135
Left Movement; Moviment d'Esquerres	MES	Social democracy Progressivism; Pro-Europeanism	Centre-left	Junts	1 / 135
Democrats of Catalonia; Demòcrates de Catalunya	DC	Christian democracy Liberal conservatism Pro-Europeanism	Centre-right	Junts	1 / 135

=== Recent pro-independence vote evolution ===
==== Catalan regional elections, consultation and independence referendum ====
Evolution of the independence vote in Catalan regional elections
Political process	Pro-independence votes	% Pro-independence (valid votes)	Census	Valid votes (Note: Blank and null votes are subtracted from the number of voters)	Turnout	Pro-independence political parties	Comments
2006	416,355	14.03	5,321,274	2,908,290	54.7%	ERC (416,355)	CiU (935,756) and ICV (316,222) were pro-sovereignty
2010	368,379	12.1	5,363,688	3,038,645	56.7%	ERC (219,173), SI (102,921), RI (39,834), PIRATA.CAT (6,451)	CiU (1,202,830), ICV (230,824)
2012	687,784	19.2	5,413,868	3,582,272	66.2%	ERC–CatSí (496,292), CUP (126,435), SI (46,838), PIRATA.CAT (18,219)	CiU (1,116,259), ICV (359,705) and PSC (524,707) in favor of a referendum
2015	1,966,835	48.1	5,510,853	4,092,349	74.3%	Junts pel Sí (1,628,714, CDC, ERC, DC, MES), CUP (337,794), PIRATA.CAT (327)	CiU was dissolved before the regional elections, leaving CDC and UDC. ICV was integrated into Podem-CSQP, which favored a referendum
2017	2,079,340	47.7	5,554,455	4,357,368	78.4%	JxCAT (948,233), ERC–CatSí (935,861), CUP (195,246)	Podem-CatComú (326,360) in favor of a referendum
2021	1,458,950	51.3	5,623,962	2,843,886	50.6%	ERC (605,529), JxCAT (570,733), CUP-G (189,814), PdeCAT (77,250), Primaries (6,006), FNC (5,008), PNC (4,610)	ECP–PEC (195,462) in favor of a referendum
2024	1,375,179	43.2	5,754,987	3,183,137	55.3%	Junts (681,470), ERC (431,128), CUP (129,059), Aliança.cat (119,149), Alhora (14,104), FNC (269)	Comuns Sumar (184,297) in favor of a referendum

The parties explicitly campaigning for independence currently represented in the Catalan Parliament are the Esquerra Republicana de Catalunya (ERC); the Junts per Catalunya coalition (composed of Crida Nacional per la República, Acció per la República, Els Verds–Alternativa Verda, and splinter elements from the PDeCAT); and the Candidatura d'Unitat Popular (CUP), which included the smaller parties Endavant and Poble Lliure. They obtained 33, 32 and 9 seats, respectively, in the 2021 regional election (a total of 74 out of 135 seats). Including those who won no seats, pro-independence parties had an overall share of 51.3% of the popular vote.

Other smaller pro-independence parties or coalitions, without present representation in any parliament, are PDeCAT (formerly called CDC), Catalan Solidarity for Independence, Estat Català, PSAN, and Reagrupament. There are also youth organisations such as Young Republican Left of Catalonia, Arran, La Forja, and the student unions SEPC and FNEC.

==== Spanish general elections in Catalonia ====
Evolution of the independence vote in the Spanish general elections (Congress of Deputies)
Election	Pro-Independence votes	% Pro-independence (valid votes)	Population	Valid votes	Turnout	Pro-independence political parties	Comments
2008	298,139	8	5,324,909	3,723,421	69.9%	ERC (298,139)	CiU (779,425)
2011	244,854	7.1	5,396,341	3,460,860	64.1%	ERC (244,854)	CiU (1,015,691)
2015	1,169,035	31.1	5,516,456	3,762,859	68.2%	ERC (601,782), CDC-DL (567,253)	En Comú (929,880)
2016	1,115,722	32.1	5,519,882	3,477,565	63.0%	ERC (632,234), CDC (483,488)	En Comú Podem (853,102) in favor of a referendum
April 2019	1,634,986	39.4	5,588,145	4,146,563	74.2%	ERC (1,020,392), JxCAT (500,787), Front Republicà (113,807)	En Comú Podem (615,665) in favor of a referendum
November 2019	1,642,063	42.5%	5,370,359	3,828,394	71.3%	ERC (869.934), JxCat (527,375), CUP (244,754)	En Comú Podem (546,733) in favor of a referendum
2023	993,109	28%	5,703,784	3,575,234	62.7%	ERC (466,020), Junts (395,429), CUP (99,644), PDeCAT (32,016)	En Comú Podem (497,617) in favor of a referendum

==== Elections to the European Parliament in Catalonia ====
Evolution of the independence vote in the European Parliament elections
Election	Pro-independence votes	% Pro-independence (valid votes)	Population	Valid votes	Turnout	Pro-independence political parties	Comments
2004	257,482	12.2	5,329,787	2,116,962	39.7%	ERC (249,757), CUP (6,185), EC (1,540)	CiU (369,103), ICV (151,871)
2009	186,104	9.5	5,370,606	1,969,043	36.7%	ERC (181,213), RC (4,891)	CiU (441,810), ICV (119,755)
2014	595,493	23.7	5,492,297	2,513,628	45.8%	ERC (595,493), CDC (549,096)	CiU (549,096), ICV (259,152)
2019	1,708,396	49.8	5,645,470	3,427,549	60.7%	JxCat (981,357), AraRep (727,039)	AraRep includes ERC
2024	785,172	32.7	5,517,772	2,402,001	43.53%	Junts (430,925), AraRep (354,247)	AraRep includes ERC

==== Unofficial consultations and referendums ====
Evolution of the independence vote in unofficial consultations and referendums
Political process	Pro-independence votes	% Pro-independence (valid votes)	Population	Valid votes	% Turnout	Comments
2014 referendum	1,861,753	80.8	6,300,000	2,305,290	36.6	Unofficial consultation
2017 referendum	2,044,038	90.2	5,343,358	2,266,498	42.4	Referendum declared illegal by the Supreme Court of Spain

=== Others ===
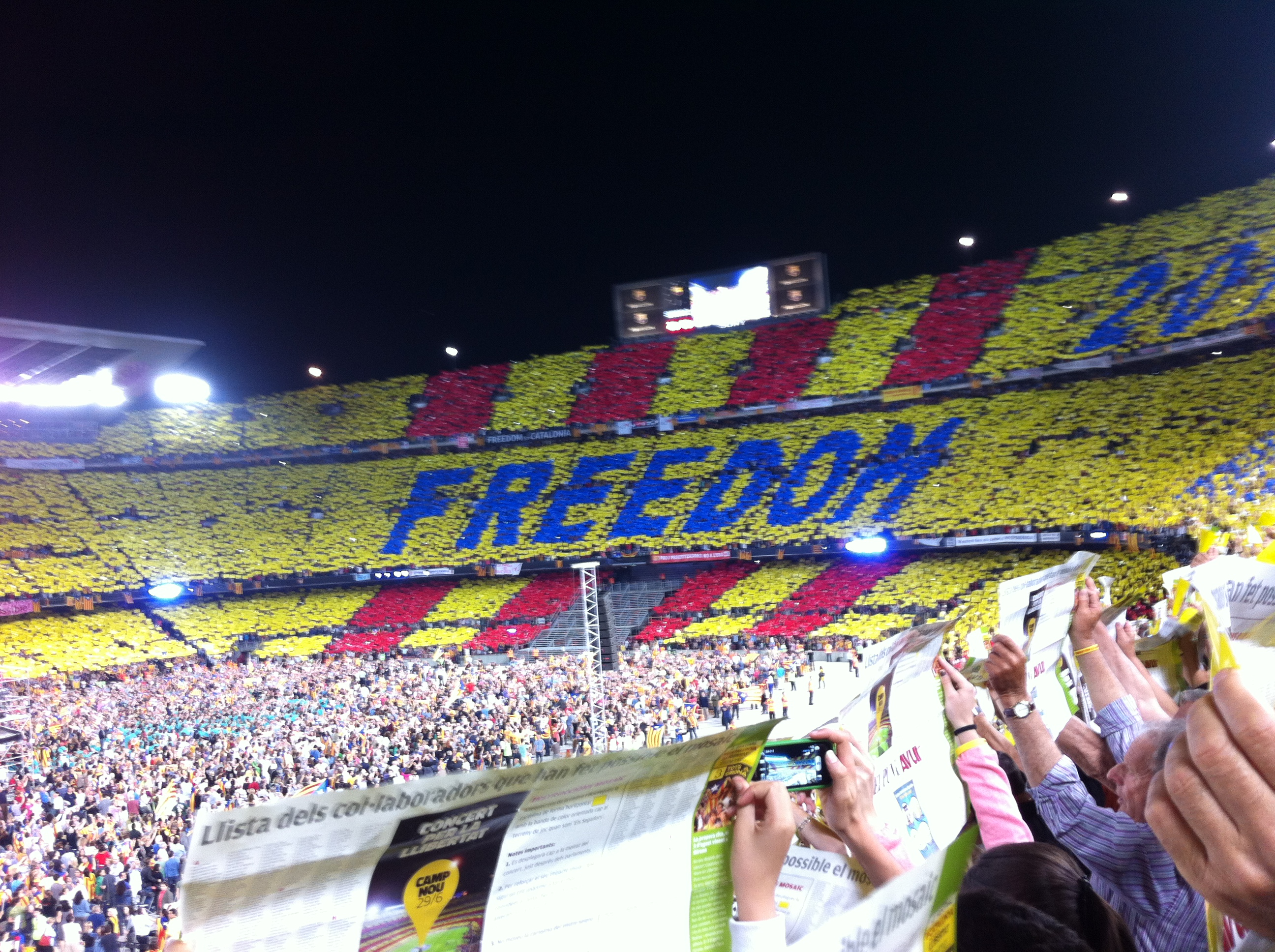
Concert for Freedom organised by the Catalan National Assembly at Camp Nou, on 29 June 2013

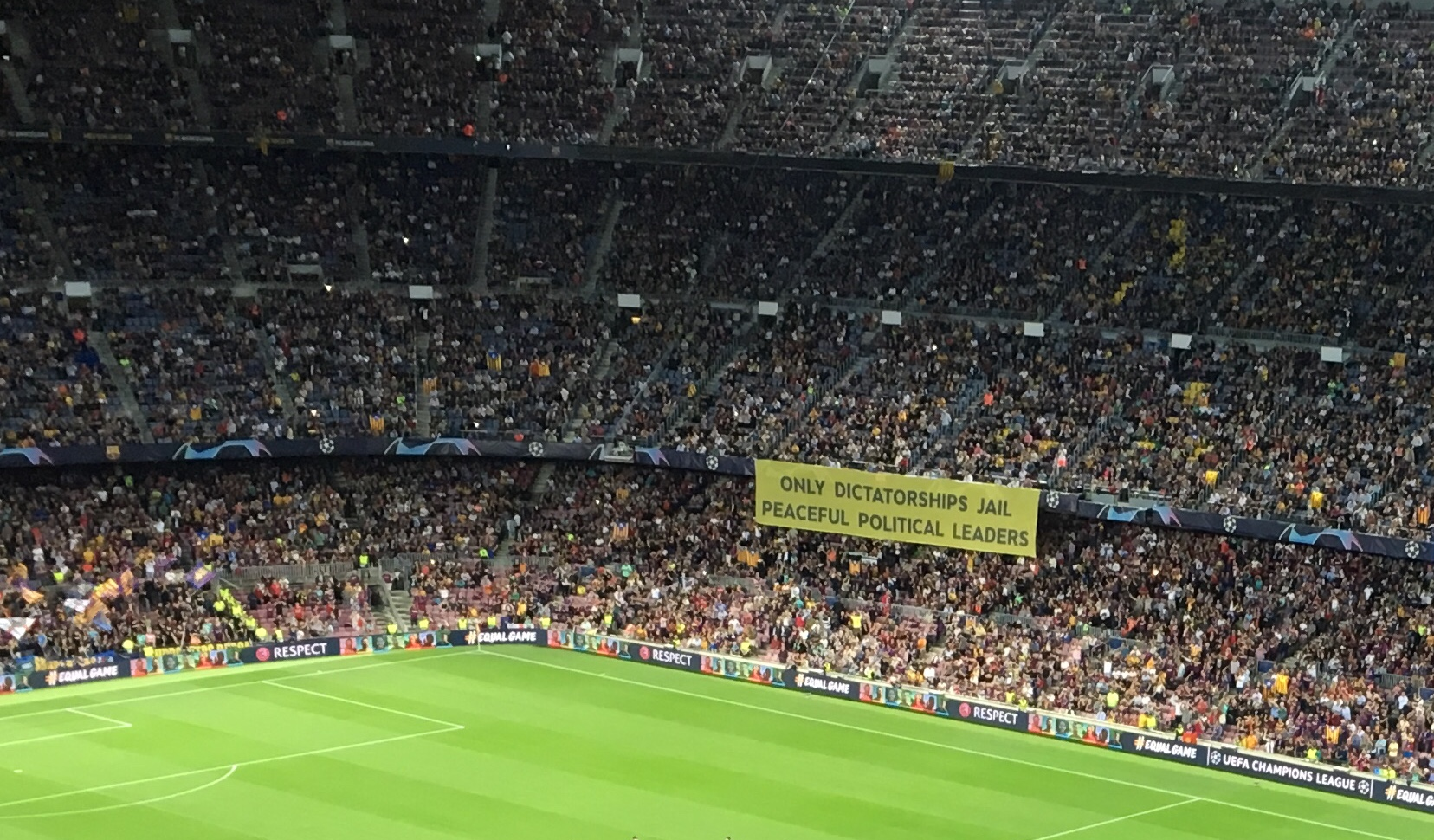
"Only dictatorships jail peaceful political leaders": a banner at a FC Barcelona match in October 2019

From around 2010, support for Catalan independence broadened from being the preserve of traditional left or far-left Catalan nationalism. Relevant examples are the liberal economists Xavier Sala-i-Martín and Ramon Tremosa Balcells (elected deputy for CiU in the European parliament in the 2009 election), the lawyer and current FC Barcelona president Joan Laporta or the jurist and former member of the Consejo General del Poder Judicial Alfons López Tena.

The Cercle d'Estudis Sobiranistes, a think tank led by the jurists Alfons López Tena and Hèctor López Bofill, was founded in 2007. It affiliated with Solidaritat Catalana per la Independència (Catalan Solidarity for Independence) in 2011.

At the beginning of 2021, Òmnium Cultural published a manifesto to obtain amnesty for Catalan politicians persecuted by the Spanish justice system. Among the signatories are four Nobel Peace Prize winners and several world-renowned personalities such as Yoko Ono and Dilma Rousseff. The Nobel Peace Prize winners that signed the manifesto are: Jody Williams, Mairead Corrigan, Shirin Ebadi and Adolfo Pérez Esquivel.

Other individuals include:

- Joan Massagué, Catalan scientist, director of the Sloan Kettering Institute.
- Pep Guardiola, Catalan former football player and manager of FC Barcelona.
- Jordi Galí, Catalan economist, director of the Centre for Research in International Economics at UPF.
- Manel Esteller, Catalan scientist, director of the Cancer Epigenetics and Biology Program of the Bellvitge Institute for Biomedical Research and editor-in-chief of the peer-reviewed journal Epigenetics.
- Lluís Llach, Catalan composer and songwriter
- Eduard Punset, Catalan politician, lawyer, economist, and science popularizer.
- Josep Carreras, Catalan tenor singer
- Sister Teresa Forcades, Catalan physician and Benedictine nun
- Pilar Rahola, Catalan journalist and writer.
- Miquel Calçada, Catalan journalist
- Joel Joan, Catalan actor
- Txarango, Catalan music band
- Xavi Hernández, former Catalan footballer who previously played and coached for FC Barcelona.
- Beth, Catalan singer; she was a contestant at Eurovision Song Contest 2003

== Opposition to independence ==
=== Political parties ===
All of the Spanish national political parties in Catalonia reject the idea of independence, except En Comú Podem and its successor Comuns Sumar, which are pro-referendum but have remained neutral on the issue. Together they represent a minority of votes and a minority of seats in the Catalan parliament. Others such as Citizens, and the People's Party of Catalonia, which had 25.4% and 4.2% of the vote respectively in the 2017 Catalan regional election, have always opposed the notion of Catalan self-determination. The Socialists' Party of Catalonia (13.9% of the vote) opposes independence as well. While some of its members supported the idea of a self-determination referendum up until 2012, the official position as of 2015 is that the Spanish Constitution should be reformed in order to better accommodate Catalonia. A slight majority of voters of left-wing platform Catalonia In Common-We Can (Catalunya En Comú-Podem) (8.94%) reject independence although the party favours a referendum in which it would campaign for Catalonia remaining part of Spain. CDC's Catalanist former-partner Unió came out against independence and fared badly in every subsequent election, eventually disbanding due to bankruptcy in 2017. Vox also strongly opposes the idea of independence or a referendum, even going so far as to propose a ban on pro-independence parties.

=== Anti-independence movement ===
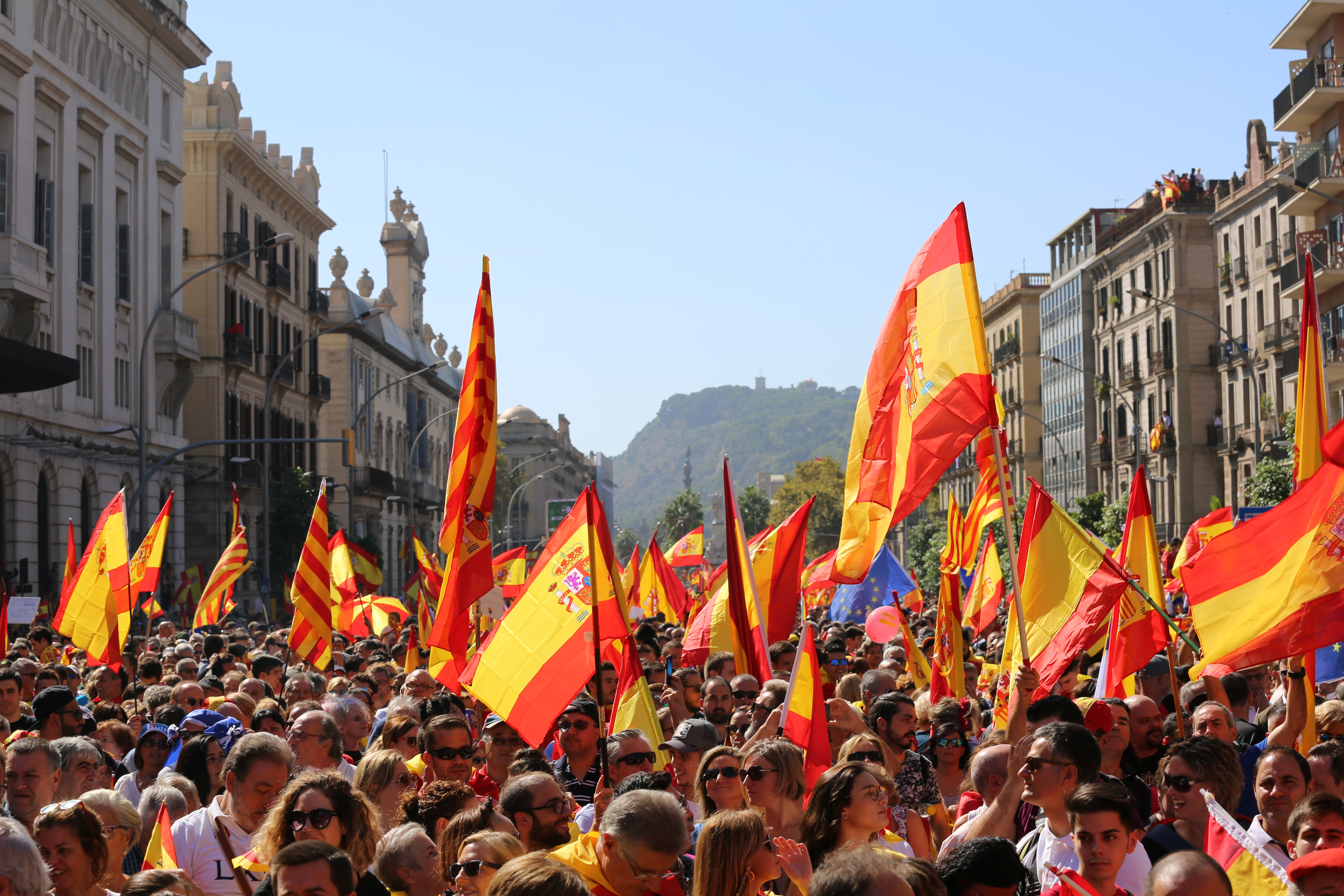
Unionist march in Barcelona in 2017 "Recuperem el seny" (Let's recover the common sense)

On 8 October 2017, Societat Civil Catalana held a rally against Catalan independence; the organisers claimed that over a million people attended, while the Barcelona police force estimated the number at about 300,000. To date this event is the largest pro-Constitution and anti-independence demonstration in the history of Catalonia.

On 12 October 2017, 65,000 people, according to the Barcelona police, marched against independence in a smaller demonstration marking the Spanish national day. The turnout was thirteen times more than the prior year and the highest on record in Barcelona's history for this event.

On 29 October 2017, hundreds of thousands of people demonstrated on the streets of Barcelona in favor of the unity of Spain and celebrating the Spanish government forcing new regional elections in December, in a demonstration called by Societat Civil Catalana. According to the Delegation of the Spanish government in Catalonia the turnout was of 1,000,000 people whereas according to the Barcelona police it was of 300,000 people. Societat Civil Catalana itself estimated the turnout at 1,000,000 people.

In 2017 the concept of 'Tabarnia' became popular on social media and received widespread media attention. Tabarnia is a fictional region covering urban coastal Catalonia demanding independence from the wider region, should it proceed with independence. Arguments in favor of Tabarnia satirically mirror those in favor of Catalan independence from Spain. Numerous pro-independence groups and individuals were critical of the concept and responded that the parody unfairly trivializes Catalonia's independence movement, which is based in part on Catalonia's distinct culture and identity. This proposal, from a platform created in 2011, was shown to map the electoral results of the Catalan regional election of 21 December 2017, which provoked renewed interest. The word 'Tabarnia' went viral on 26 December 2017, reaching worldwide top-trending status with over 648,000 mentions. The first major demonstration in favour of Tabarnia's autonomy from Catalonia took place in Barcelona on 4 February 2017, with 15,000 participants according to the Guàrdia Urbana and 200,000 according to organizers.

In these years, different figures from Catalan culture and politics have spoken out against the process, like Joan Manuel Serrat, Josep Borrell, Isabel Coixet, Pau Gasol, Mercedes Milá, Estopa, Montserrat Caballé or Núria Espert among others.

=== Other individuals ===
- José Luis Bonet, Catalan businessman, Chairman of Freixenet
- Juan José Brugera, Catalan businessman, Chairman of Inmobiliaria Colonial
- Isidre Fainé, Catalan banker, Chairman of Caixabank
- José Creuheras, Catalan businessman, Chairman of Planeta Group
- Javier Godó, Catalan businessman, Chairman of Grupo Godó
- Antón Costas, Catalan businessman, Founder of pharmaceutical company Almirall
- Eduardo Mendoza Garriga, Catalan novelist
- Juan Marsé, Catalan novelist, journalist and screenwriter.
- Albert Boadella, Catalan actor, director and playwright
- Mercedes Milá, Catalan television presenter and journalist
- Javier Sardà, Catalan presenter and journalist
- Jordi Évole, Catalan presenter and journalist
- Montserrat Caballé, Catalan operatic soprano
- Joan Manuel Serrat, Catalan musician, singer-songwriter, recording artist, and performer
- Estopa, Catalan rock/rumba duo
- Loquillo, Catalan rock singer
- Miguel Poveda, Catalan flamenco singer
- Núria Espert, Catalan theatre and television actress, theatre and opera director
- Javier Cárdenas Catalan singer and television and radio presenter
- Isabel Coixet, Catalan film director
- Santi Millán, Catalan actor, showman and television presenter
- Risto Mejide, Catalan publicist, author, music producer, talent show judge, TV presenter and songwriter
- Susanna Griso, Catalan presenter and journalist
- Jorge Javier Vázquez, Catalan television presenter
- Dani Pedrosa, Catalan Grand Prix motorcycle racer

== Opinion polling ==
This is a list of recent opinion polling on the subject. Most polls are conducted by the Centre d'Estudis d'Opinió, a research institute under the purview of the Catalan government, or the Institut de Ciencès Politiques i Socials, a part of the Autonomous University of Barcelona. However newspapers such as La Vanguardia or El Periodico also sometimes conduct polls on the subject.

The highest level of support for independence on record was registered in November 2012, with 57.0% of the Catalan population in favour of independence from Spain and 20.5% in opposition, according to a survey conducted by the Centre d'Estudis d'Opinió. In a survey in the same series conducted in March 2025, 38% of respondents expressed support for independence, marking the lowest recorded level of support, while 54% of respondents in the same survey opposed Catalonia’s secession from Spain, the highest recorded level of opposition.

Questions about a referendum are listed below if asked, however the ICPS also asked 'Do you want Catalunya to be an independent state or do you prefer to stay part of Spain?', where 'stay part of Spain' regularly performs ~10 points better than 'No' on the referendum question.

Date(s) conducted	Polling organisation/client	Sample size	Yes	No	No Answer/Don't Know	Lead	Notes
21 May–25 June 2026	Centre d'Estudis d'Opinió	2,000	45.0%	50.5%	4.5%	5.5%	
30 May–28 June 2025	Centre d'Estudis d'Opinió	2,000	40.2%	51.5%	8.2%	11.3%	
10 June–8 July 2024	Centre d'Estudis d'Opinió	2,000	39.9%	53.3%	6.9%	13.4%	
10–12 May 2021	GAD3/La Vanguardia	800	41.5%	51.9%	6.6%	10.4%	
17 Nov–17 Dec 2021	Centre d'Estudis d'Opinió	1,200	40.8%	52.3%	6.9%	11.5%	
10–12 May 2021	GAD3/La Vanguardia	800	41.5%	51.9%	6.6%	10.4%	
8–12 Feb 2021	ElectoPanel/Electomanía	2,129	47.7%	49.9%	2.4%	2.2%	
23 Sep–9 Oct 2020	Centre d'Estudis d'Opinió	1,500	45.5%	46.3%	8.2%	0.8%	
7 Sep 2020	GAD3/La Vanguardia	800	45.2%	46.7%	8.1%	1.5%	
9 Feb–3 Mar 2020	Centre d'Estudis d'Opinió	1,500	44.9%	47.1%	8.1%	2.2%	
3–6 Feb 2020	GAD3/La Vanguardia	800	44%	49%	7%	5%	
25 Sep–23 Oct 2019	Institut de Ciències Politiques i Socials	1,200	46.0%	31.5%	22.5%	14.5%	
16 Sep–7 Oct 2019	Centre d'Estudis d'Opinió	1,500	40.3%	49.3%	10.4%	8.4%	
4–25 Mar 2019	Centre d'Estudis d'Opinió	2,000	48.4%	44.1%	7.5%	4.3%	
8 Oct–5 Nov 2018	Institut de Ciències Politiques i Socials	1,200	47.9%	31.8%	20.2%	16.1%	

1. Question: 'Do you want Catalunya to be an independent state?' Responses: Yes, No, Don't know, No answer
2. Question: 'If tomorrow a referendum were held to decide the independence of Catalunya, what would you do?' Responses: 'I would vote in favour', 'I would vote against', 'I wouldn't vote', 'Blank or empty vote' or 'Don't know/No Response'
3. Question 'In a referendum on Catalan independence, what way would you vote?' Responses: 'Yes', 'No', 'Don't know, No answer'

== Long-term prospects ==
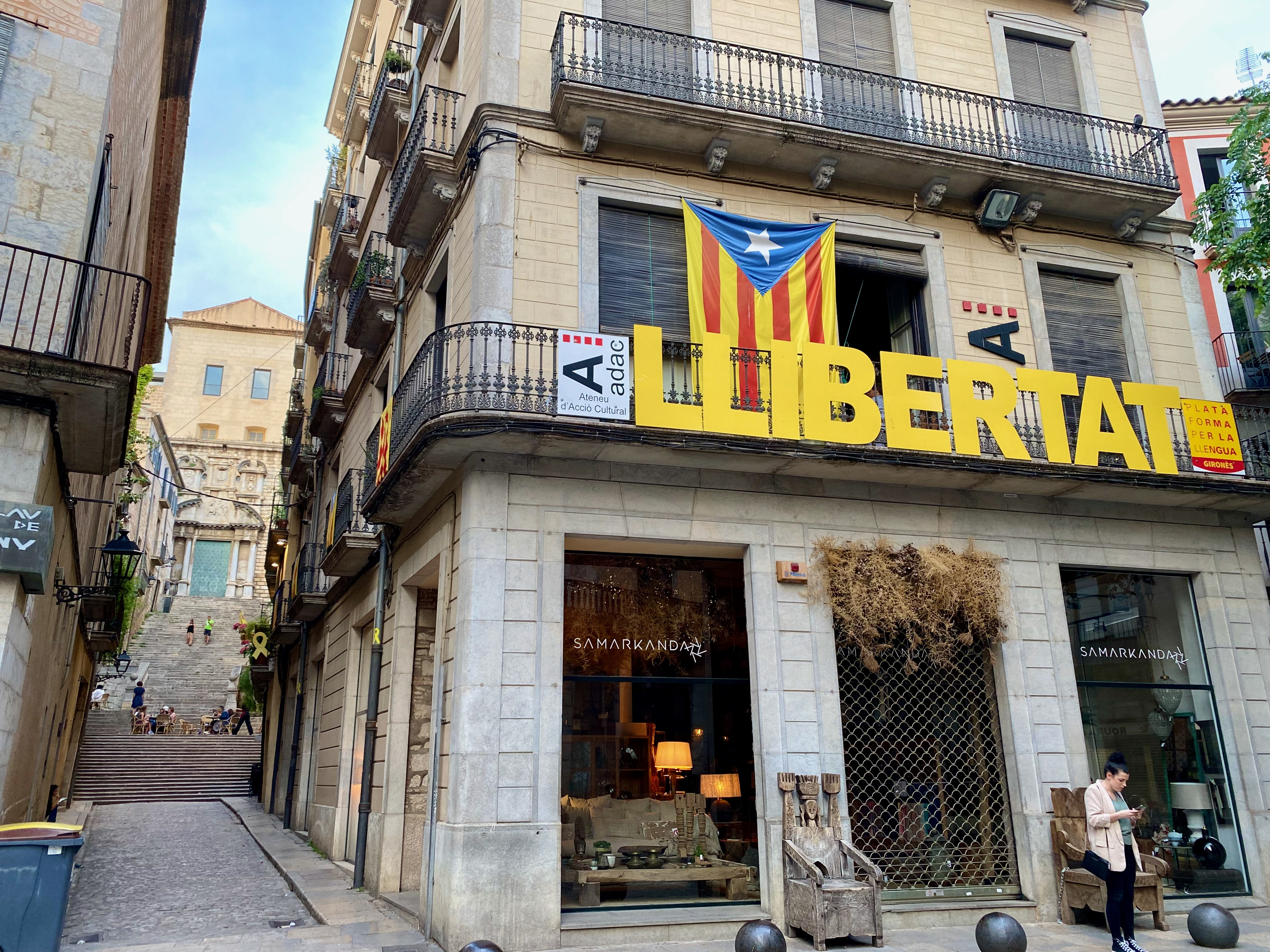
Catalan nationalism on display in Girona

Under Spanish law, lawfully exiting Spain would require the Spanish parliament to amend the constitution. It may be difficult for an independent Catalonia to gain international recognition; for example, many countries (including Spain) fail to recognize Kosovo. Most of Catalonia's foreign exports go to the European Union; Catalonia would need Spain's permission if it wishes to eventually re-enter the EU following secession. Catalonia already runs its own police, schools, healthcare, transport, agriculture, environment policy, and municipal governments. Other institutions, such as a central bank and a revenue collection service would have to be rebuilt, possibly losing existing economies of scale. Accounting measures vary, but the BBC and The Washington Post cite estimates that in 2014 Catalans may have paid about 10 billion euros (or about US$12 billion) more in taxes to the state than what it received in exchange. As of 2014, an independent Catalonia would be the 34th largest economy in the world. Should Catalonia secede from Spain, some residents of Val d'Aran (population 10,000) have stated they might break away from Catalonia, although others state that the local identity has only been recognised by the Catalan government, something the Spanish state never did.

== Criticism ==
Opponents of Catalan independence have accused the movement of racism or elitism, and argue that the majority of the Catalan public does not support independence. In an op-ed for The Guardian Aurora Nacarino-Brabo and Jorge San Miguel Lobeto, two political scientists affiliated with the anti-independence Ciutadans Spanish nationalist party, disputed the claim that Catalonia has been oppressed or excluded from Spanish politics. They argued that the independence movement is "neither inclusive nor progressive", and criticised nationalists for excluding the Spanish speaking population of Catalonia, and resorting to what they argue are appeals to ethnicity. These criticisms of ethnic-based appeals and exclusion of Spanish speakers have been echoed by other politicians and public figures opposed to independence, such as former Spanish Prime Minister Felipe González, and the leader of Ciutadans in Catalonia Inés Arrimadas. Polls show that the wish for independence is positively correlated with having Catalonia-born parents and grandparents, families which also tend to fare better economically.

Statements by different key figures in the independence movement have sometimes contributed to this view. In 2013 Carme Forcadell, then president of the influential Assemblea Nacional Catalana and later president of the Parliament of Catalonia publicly declared that the Partido Popular and Citizens were not part of the 'Catalan people' and hence were 'enemies' to defeat. Former president of the Parliament of Catalonia Núria de Gispert has been involved in controversy over the years due to her Tweets, including comparing members of those two parties with pigs to be exported, or for revealing the address of the school where Citizens' leader Albert Rivera's daughter studied. Quim Torra, who was appointed president of the regional parliament of Catalonia in 2018, was also involved in controversy regarding past tweets suggesting "Spaniards know only how to plunder" and describing them as having "a rough patch in their DNA".

Members of the Catalan independence movement have strongly denied their movement is xenophobic or supremacist and define it as "an inclusive independence movement in which neither the origin nor the language are important". In addition, independence supporters usually allege that most far-right and xenophobic groups in Catalonia support Spanish nationalism, and usually participate in unionist demonstrations.

On the part of the independence movement, the Comitès de Defensa de la República (Committees for the Defense of the Republic; CDR) were created and organised to hinder police action through passive resistance. In September 2019, seven members of the CDR, alleged to be a branch called "Equipos de Respuesta Técnica" (Tactical Response Teams), were arrested for terrorist offenses; they were said to have been found with explosive material and maps of official buildings. Three of them were released on bail in October 2019.

== See also ==
- Catalan autonomist campaign of 1918-1919
- 2017–18 Spanish constitutional crisis
- Anna Arqué i Solsona
- Carles Castellanos i Llorenç
- History of Catalonia
- Welsh independence
- Scottish independence
- Basque Country independence
- Galician independence movement
- National and regional identity in Spain
- List of active separatist movements in Europe
- Nation state
- History of political Catalanism
