= Landes Bioscience =

Publisher of bioscience journals

- Status: Active
- Founded: 1997
- Country of origin: United States
- Headquarters location: Austin, Texas
- Distribution: Worldwide
- Publication types: Scientific journals
- Nonfiction topics: Bioscience
- Official website: www.landesbioscience.com

Landes Bioscience is an Austin, Texas-based publisher of bioscience journals. Cell Cycle, one of its first two journals, achieved the highest percent increase in total citations in molecular biology and genetics for the period of July–August 2007, with 1490 papers cited 6228 times. It was acquired by Taylor & Francis in June 2014.

== Journals ==
By 2013, Landes Bioscience had published 48 scholarly journals, most of which were indexed in SCI,including Epigenetics, Autophagy, Cell Cycle, RNA Biology, OncoImmunology, and mAbs, covering research areas such as autophagy, the cell cycle, tumorigenesis, epigenetics, monoclonal antibodies, bioengineering, transgenic research, and systems biology.

Following its 2014 acquisition, Landes Bioscience's journals continued to be published by Taylor & Francis under the Landes Bioscience imprint name; several of its titles, including mAbs, Gut Microbes, and Bioengineered (formerly Bioengineered Bugs), operate under a 12-month embargo policy for self-archiving.

== See also ==
- Journals published by Landes Bioscience
