= Virulence (journal) =

- Discipline: Microbiology, immunology
- Language: English
- Edited by: Eleftherios Mylonakis (2010-2019), Kevin Tyler (since 2019)

Publication details
- History: 2010-present
- Publisher: Taylor & Francis (United Kingdom)
- Open access: Open Access
- Impact factor: 5.2 (2022)

Standard abbreviations
- ISO 4: Virulence

Indexing
- ISSN: 2150-5594 (print); 2150-5608 (web)
- LCCN: 2009202798
- OCLC no.: 429901784

Links
- Journal homepage

Virulence is a peer-reviewed medical journal that covers microbiology and immunology specifically, microorganism pathogenicity, the infection process and host–pathogen interactions. It is a fully Open Access journal published by Taylor & Francis. It was previously published 8 times per year by Landes Bioscience. The journal was established in 2010 by Eva M. Riedmann, and Eleftherios Mylonakis. The editor-in-chief is Kevin Tyler (University of East Anglia).

== Indexing and abstracting ==
The journal is abstracted and indexed in:

- Academic Search
- Biological Abstracts
- BIOSIS Previews
- CAB Abstracts
- Embase
- Global Health
- Index Medicus/PubMed/MEDLINE
- Science Citation Index Expanded
- Scopus
- Tropical Diseases Bulletin

According to the Journal Citation Reports, the journal has a 2022 impact factor of 5.2.
