= Carles Castellanos i Llorenç =

vice-president Catalan National Assembly
- In office 2012–2013
- Constituency: Barcelona

Personal details
- Born: 1 June 1942 (age 84) Barcelona, Spain
- Party: Catalan National Assembly
- Education: University of Barcelona; Autonomous University of Barcelona
- Profession: Academic

Carles Castellanos i Llorenç (born 1942, in Barcelona) is a writer, translator, and political activist of the Catalan independence movement. He holds a PhD in Translation from the Universitat Autònoma de Barcelona, has been director of the Department of Translation and Interpreting of this University, and is currently a professor of doctoral studies in this Department. He is a member of the Catalan National Assembly and was vice-president from 2012 to 2013, as well as a member of Poble Lliure and the Popular Unity Candidacy of Barcelona.

== Biography ==
When he was a boy he participated in advocacy and cultural tasks in the Sant Andreu neighborhood of Barcelona and joined the National Front of Catalonia (FNC) in 1960. In 1968 he was one of the founders of the Socialist Party of National Liberation (PSAN). In 1974 he created the PSAN-Provisional a split from the PSAN. In 1979 he formed Independentists of the Catalan Countries (IPC) after union with the Socialist National Liberation Organization (OSAN) of Northern Catalonia. He was later one of the driving forces behind the Movement for Defence of the Land (MDT) from 1983 to 1984 and joined it again in 1985 (after IPC temporarily left that organization). During the following decades, he was one of the most prominent leaders of the MDT. Due to militance in the Esquerra Independentista, he suffered several arrests and imprisonments during the early years of the Spanish transition to democracy, in 1981, 1982 (for carrying a banner with the slogan "Independence"), in 1988 and in 1992, when he was persecuted during Operation Garzón, which is why he went underground and had to go into temporary exile.

He is a member, among other entities, of the Pau Vila Research and Documentation Centre, the Catalan Forum for the Right to Self-Determination, Circle 21, and the Platform for the Right to Decide. He has been one of the prominent promoters of the Language Defense Groups (1982–1988) and the Third Congress of Catalan Culture (1999–2001). He was vice president of the Catalan National Assembly from 2012 to 2013.

The protracted independence militancy has led to many arrests and tortures, with 4 periods of imprisonment, clandestinity, and exile.

== Academic assignment ==
He is an industrial engineer and linguist, author (or co-author) of several works lexicographical, among which, we can highlight the Dictionary French-Catalan/Catalan-French (1979, expanded in 2003), the Diccionari d'informàtica (1982), the Diccionari de paranys de traducció (false friends) (2000) and the Diccionari bàsic occità-català (2008). He directed the ACTIVE Project (for the learning of Catalan for computer media) between 1977 and 1982. In addition, he is the author of numerous articles and works on the subject of sociolinguistics, historiographic and politics, among which the following must be established: The national phenomenon (1974), Elements of historical materialism (1977), Small dictionary of independence (1988–1990), A language without order or concert (1993), Language and variation (1993), Catalan independence, 1979–1994 (1994), Language, dialects and standardisation (2002).

He has translated several works, including from the French, Catalonia a thousand years ago, by Pierre Bonnassie (t. 1981) and Els paradisos artificial by Baudelaire (t. 1990); of the Classical Egyptian, History of Sinuhè and other tales (2005); and, from the Berber, the collection of poems Blind Sun, by Salem Zenia (2008).

A scholar of linguistic standardization and Afro-Asiatic languages, he has done his thesis and published several papers on the Amazigh language, such as La llengua rifenya (1995), Guia de conversa universitària amazic-català (2006) and is currently vice-director of the Observatori Català de la Llengua Amaziga. He has published a book of memoirs Relive the days – memories of a silenced time (2003).

== Works ==
- Diccionari francès-català (1979)
- Diccionari d'informàtica (1986)
- Una llengua sense ordre ni concert (1993)
- Llengua, dialectes i estandardització (2000)
- Els amazics (CIEMEN, 2010)
- Els cosins del català (Volaina Edicions, 2019)
- Reviure els fets: Memòries polítiques (1960–2020) (Edicions del 1979, 2020)

== See also ==
- Anna Arqué i Solsona
