= Cell and Tissue Research =

- Discipline: Cell biology
- Language: English
- Edited by: Klaus Unsicker

Publication details
- History: Founded 1924
- Publisher: Springer (United States)
- Frequency: Quarterly
- Impact factor: 3.043 (2017)

Standard abbreviations
- ISO 4: Cell Tissue Res.

Indexing
- ISSN: 0302-766X (print); 1432-0878 (web)

Links
- Journal homepage

Cell and Tissue Research presents regular articles and reviews in the areas of molecular, cell, stem cell biology and tissue engineering. In particular, the journal provides a forum for publishing data that analyze the supracellular, integrative actions of gene products and their impact on the formation of tissue structure and function. Articles emphasize structure–function relationships as revealed by recombinant molecular technologies. The coordinating editor of the journal is Klaus Unsicker.

== Subjects covered in journal ==
Areas of research frequently published in Cell and Tissue Research include: neurobiology, neuroendocrinology, endocrinology, reproductive biology, skeletal and immune systems, and development.

== Editors ==
The coordinating editor of the journal is Klaus Unsicker, of the University of Heidelberg. Section editors are K. Unsicker, neurobiology/sense organs/endocrinology; M. Furutani-Seiki, Development/growth/regeneration; W.W. Franke, molecular/cell biology; Andreas Oksche and Horst-Werner Korf, neuroendocrinology; T. Pihlajaniemi, extracellular Extracellular matrix; D. Furst, muscle; Joseph Bonventre, kidney and related subjects; P. Sutovsky, reproductive biology; B. Singh, immunology/hematology; and V. Hartenstein, invertebrates.

== See also ==
- Autophagy (journal)
- Cell Biology International
- Cell Cycle (journal)
