= Cell Cycle =

- Discipline: Cell biology
- Language: English
- Edited by: Prof. G. Santulli

Publication details
- History: 2002–present
- Publisher: Taylor & Francis
- Frequency: Biweekly
- Impact factor: 7.7

Standard abbreviations
- ISO 4: Cell Cycle

Indexing
- CODEN: CCEYAS
- ISSN: 1538-4101 (print); 1551-4005 (web)
- LCCN: 2002212522
- OCLC no.: 48778167

Links
- Journal homepage; Online access; Online archive

Cell Cycle is a biweekly peer-reviewed scientific journal covering all aspects of cell biology. It was established in 2002. Originally published bimonthly, it is now published biweekly.

== Abstracting and indexing ==
The journal is abstracted and indexed in:

- Biological Abstracts
- BIOSIS Previews
- Chemical Abstracts Service
- Current Contents/Life Sciences
- Embase
- Index Medicus/MEDLINE/PubMed
- Science Citation Index Expanded
- Scopus

According to the Journal Citation Reports, the journal has a 5-year impact factor of 7.7 and a 2025 CiteScore of 8.7.

== See also ==
- Autophagy
- Cell Biology International
- Cell and Tissue Research
