= Congress of Catalan Culture =

Former Catalan studies group

The Congress of Catalan Culture (in Catalan, el Congrés de Cultura Catalana, abbreviated as CCC) was a group of activities organized by the School of Lawyers of Barcelona, geared towards the study and diffusion of the Catalan culture, developed between 1975 and 1977.

The aim was to promote the Catalan culture through diverse proposals for the future, which were concretized in a group of twenty-three fields of study, developed by experts in diverse fields of the Catalan culture. Under the presidency of Jordi Rubió i Balaguer, a commission travelled during the course of the year 1976 throughout the entire geography of the so-called Catalan Countries (Catalonia, Valencia, Balearic, Andorra and Rosellón), gathering information and proposals that were compiled into three volumes. In total 12,400 congressmen participated.

Among other actions, the congress expressed the desirability of safeguarding aspects such as natural heritage and the identification of the territory, the official use of the Catalan language, the revitalization of the culture and the folklore popular, and the maintenance of the Catalan institutions. Given the success of the initiative, short after the official closing of the campaign on 27 November 1977, in December 1978, it was accorded the establishment of a foundation in charge of the maintenance and consolidation of the Catalan culture, called Foundation Congress of Catalan Culture (in Catalan, Fundació Congrés of Catalan Culture), sponsored by the School of Lawyers of Barcelona, Acció Cultural of the Country Valencià and Balearic Cultural Work, in addition to diverse elective employers.
