= Autophagy (journal) =

- Discipline: Cell biology
- Language: English
- Edited by: Daniel J. Klionsky

Publication details
- History: 2005–present
- Publisher: Taylor & Francis
- Frequency: Monthly
- Open access: Delayed, after 12 months
- Impact factor: 16.016 (2020)

Standard abbreviations
- ISO 4: Autophagy

Indexing
- ISSN: 1554-8627 (print); 1554-8635 (web)
- LCCN: 2005212153
- OCLC no.: 57894812

Links
- Journal homepage; Online access; Online archive

Autophagy is a monthly peer-reviewed scientific journal covering all aspects of cell autophagy. It is published by Taylor & Francis and the editor-in-chief is Daniel J. Klionsky (University of Michigan).

== Abstracting and indexing ==
The journal is abstracted and indexed in:

- BIOSIS Previews
- Biological Abstracts
- Index Medicus/MEDLINE/PubMed
- Science Citation Index Expanded

According to the Journal Citation Reports, the journal has a 2020 impact factor of 16.016 and a five-year impact factor of 16.586 (2020) .

== See also ==
- Nature Communications
- PNAS
- Traffic Journal
- Cell Biology International
- Cell and Tissue Research
- Cell Cycle
