= Manel Esteller =

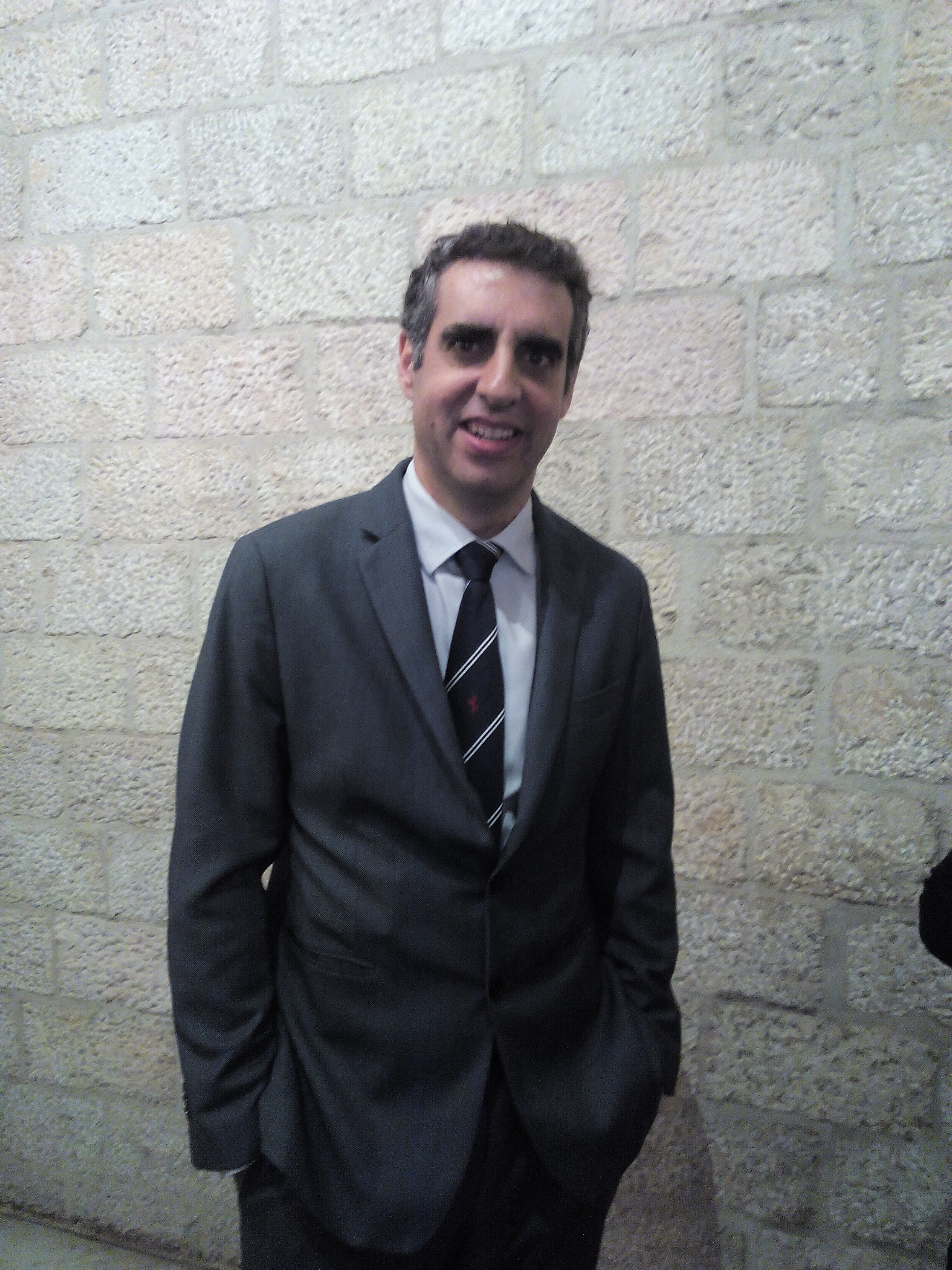
Manel Esteller

Manel Esteller (Sant Boi de Llobregat, Barcelona, Catalonia, 1968) graduated in medicine from the University of Barcelona in 1992, where he also obtained his doctorate, specializing in the molecular genetics of endometrial carcinoma, in 1996. He was an invited researcher at the School of Biological and Medical Sciences at the University of St Andrews, Scotland, during which time his research interests focused on the molecular genetics of inherited breast cancer.

Manel Esteller is the director of the Cancer Epigenetics and Biology Program (PEBC) of the Bellvitge Institute for Biomedical Research (IDIBELL), leader of the Cancer Epigenetics Group, professor of Genetics in the School of Medicine of the University of Barcelona, and research professor at the Catalan Institution for Research and Advanced Studies (ICREA). He is also the editor-in-chief of the peer-reviewed journal Epigenetics.

== Current work ==
Esteller works in the field of epigenetics of health and disease. Starting from identical genetic sequences, changes in histone modifications and DNA methylation can produce organisms with different features and distinct susceptibility to sickness. An example is monozygotic twins. To have a complete picture of what is going on with the epigenetic tapestry of our cells, Esteller has advocated the development of a comprehensive Human Epigenome Project (HEP) to map all the epigenetic marks in our genetic material. This could have a huge impact in cancer patients, because malignant cells have a profound dysregulation of DNA methylation and histone modification patterns. The good news is that the first pharmacological compounds to "restore" the normal epigenetic landscapes are starting to emerge.

Esteller edited the book "DNA Methylation: Approaches, Methods and Applications" - in the book, he attempts to explain to readers how DNA methylation plays a role in disease, particularly the role in cancer. He also summarizes a lot of research from clinical trials and other research that has been done on DNA methylation in the human body to provide readers with many different point of views concerning the topic.

"Epigenetics in biology and medicine" is another book in which Esteller explained the main principles of epigenetics, new discoveries in the field, and how they can be applied functionally. He has examined the relationship between epigenetics and "disease, genetic syndromes, immunity, cardiovascular disease, and epigenomics."
