= Cell Biology International =

- Discipline: Cell biology
- Language: English
- Edited by: D.N. Wheatley

Publication details
- Former name: Cell Biology International Reports
- History: 1977-present
- Publisher: Portland Press
- Frequency: Monthly
- Impact factor: 1.747 (2010)

Standard abbreviations
- ISO 4: Cell Biol. Int.

Indexing
- CODEN: CBIIEV
- ISSN: 1065-6995 (print); 1095-8355 (web)
- LCCN: 93655029
- OCLC no.: 26684328

Links
- Journal homepage; Online archive; Online archive of Cell Biology International Reports

Cell Biology International is a peer-reviewed scientific journal published by Portland Press for the International Federation for Cell Biology. The journal was established in 1977 as Cell Biology International Reports (ISSN 0309-1651) and published by Elsevier, obtaining its current name in 1993. The journal was transferred to Portland Press in 2010. It covers all aspects of cell biology.

== Abstracting and indexing ==
The journal is abstracted and indexed in:

- BIOBASE
- BIOSIS
- Chemical Abstracts Service
- Current Contents
- EMBASE
- MEDLINE/Index Medicus
- Science Citation Index

According to the Journal Citation Reports, the journal has a 2010 impact factor of 1.747.

== See also ==
- Autophagy (journal)
- Cell and Tissue Research
