= Epigenetics (journal) =

- Discipline: Epigenetics
- Language: English
- Edited by: Manel Esteller

Publication details
- History: 2006-present
- Publisher: Taylor & Francis
- Frequency: Monthly
- Impact factor: 4.918 (2017)

Standard abbreviations
- ISO 4: Epigenetics

Indexing
- CODEN: EPIGB6
- ISSN: 1559-2294 (print); 1559-2308 (web)
- LCCN: 2005215942
- OCLC no.: 62511425

Links
- Journal homepage; Online access; Online archive

Epigenetics is a monthly peer-reviewed scientific journal covering research pertaining to epigenetics. It was established in 2006 and published by Landes Bioscience, until this company was acquired by Taylor & Francis in 2014. It is the official journal of the Epigenetics Society (formerly the DNA Methylation Society). The editor-in-chief is Manel Esteller (University of Barcelona).

== Abstracting and indexing ==
The journal is abstracted and indexed in:

- Biological Abstracts
- Elsevier Biobase
- EMBASE
- Scopus
- Medline/PubMed
- BIOSIS Previews
- Science Citation Index Expanded

According to the Journal Citation Reports, the journal has a 2017 impact factor of 4.918, ranking it 51st out of 292 journals in the category "Biochemistry & Molecular Biology" and 30th out of 171 in the category "Genetics & Heredity".
