= Anna Arqué i Solsona =

Catalan politician

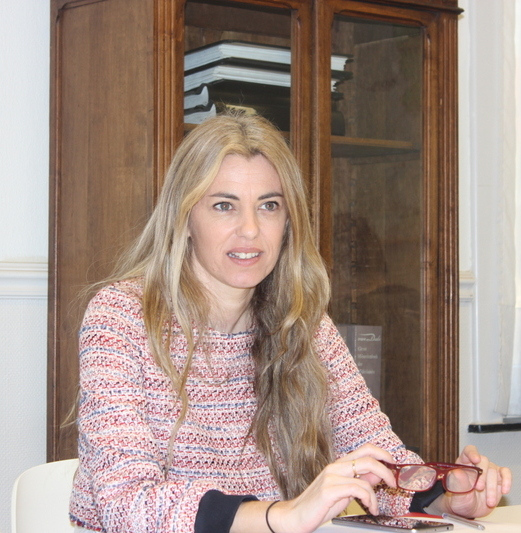
- Anna Arqué (2019)
- Born: 8 May 1972 (age 54); Lleida, Catalonia, Spain
- Education: University of Lleida
- Known for: National Coordinator of Consultations

Anna Arqué i Solsona (born 8 May 1972 in Lérida, Spain) is a Catalan activist in the Catalan independence movement and consultant in communication strategies. She is vice-rector of the Catalan Summer University.

She studied "Business Administration" at the University of Lleida and when she finished she went to live in Lisbon where she worked as a model. Then she moved to London where she acted as a consultant in communication strategies, working for several companies.

In 2009, she was involved in the independence platform Ten thousand in Brussels. Shortly after, she took charge of the International and Communication Commissions of the National Coordinator of Consultations. She left the position when she was on the electoral list with Catalan Solidarity for Independence in the 2010 elections, where she was not elected.

She is spokesperson for the Catalan Countries of the International Commission of European Citizens (ICEC - International Commission of European Citizens).

She is also the spokesperson for the association Primàries Catalunya.

She has lived in several countries, and speaks their languages: England, Germany, Portugal and Italy.

== See also ==
- Carles Castellanos i Llorenç
