= Inmobiliaria Colonial =

Spanish real estate company

Inmobiliaria Colonial, SOCIMI, S.A.
- Type: Sociedad Anónima
- Traded as: BMAD: COL; IBEX 35
- ISIN: ES0139140018
- Industry: Real estate
- Founded: 1946
- Headquarters: Barcelona, Spain
- Key people: Mariano Miguel (president)
- Products: Real estate
- Revenue: ▲€354.514 million (2019)
- Net income: ▲€992.523 million (2019)
- Total assets: ▲€12.501 billion (2019)
- Total equity: ▲€6.960 billion (2019)
- Number of employees: ▲10,763 (2019)
- Website: www.inmocolonial.com

Inmobiliaria Colonial is a Spanish multinational corporation, which includes companies in the domains of real estate. The company operates a Real Estate Investment Trust (REIT) and its activities are divided between property rental, as well as land and development.

Colonial Group recorded the closing of the third quarter of 2015 with a net result of 213 million euros, which meant an increase of 354 million euros compared to the previous year. During 2015, a high number of hirings was generated, which led to closing the year with a significant growth in employment. The latest acquisitions of the group are those of a building that is experiencing to convert it into a sustainable building with a Leed Gold energy rating.
