= August Gil Matamala =

Catalan human rights lawyer

August Gil i Matamala
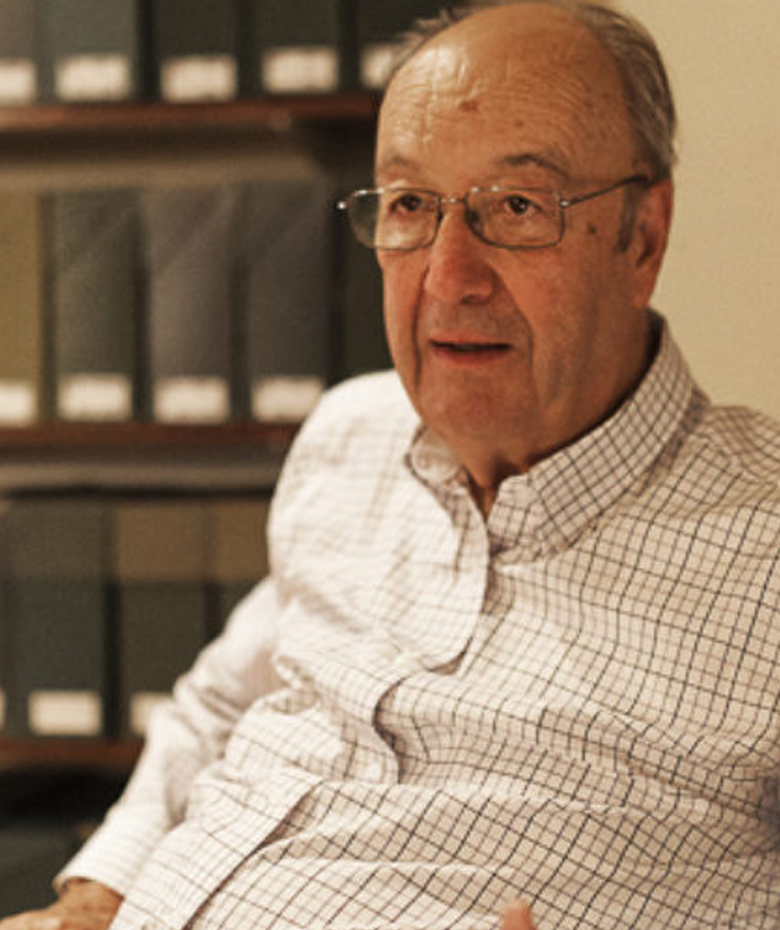
- August Gil i Matamala in 2021
- Born: September 19, 1934 (age 91); Barcelona, Catalonia, Spain
- Occupation: Human rights lawyer
- Known for: Defense of political activists during the Franco regime; human rights advocacy
- Spouse: Isabel Giner i San Julián
- Children: Ariadna Gil i Giner
- Awards: Creu de Sant Jordi (2007); Lluís Companys Memorial Award (2013); Gold Medal of Civic Merit of Barcelona (2019)

August Gil i Matamala (born 19 September 1934, Barcelona) is a Catalan human rights lawyer noted for defending political dissidents, trade unionists and pro-independence activists from the Franco era to the present. A prominent labour lawyer before the Tribunal de Orden Público, he later represented Catalan and Basque activists, including those detained in Operation Garzón. He served as president of the Association of European Democratic Lawyers and has been active in left-wing political initiatives. His honours include the Creu de Sant Jordi (2007), the Lluís Companys Memorial Award (2013) and Barcelona's Gold Medal of Civic Merit (2019).

== Biography ==
Married to Isabel Giner i San Julián and father of actor Ariadna Gil i Giner. He has had a long and prestigious career in the field of defence of human rights. He set up the first university branch of the PSUC (Unified Socialist Party of Catalonia) in 1956 while studying for a law degree at the University of Barcelona. Between 1960 and 1975 he defended trade unionists from Workers' Commissions, members of Bandera Roja and other political activists before the Francoist Tribunal de Orden Público (Court of Public Order) and he became a well-known labour lawyer. After the end of the Franco regime, he represented Catalan and Basque pro-independence activists. In particular, he defended those from Terra Lliure rounded up in Operation Garzón. He chaired the Association of European Democratic Lawyers (AED), set up in Strasbourg in 1990 and dedicated to defending citizens' rights, preserving the independence of lawyers and fighting for the establishment of a democratic and progressive system of European law.

On October 13, 2012, he was chosen to be the eighty-fifth on the list of the CUP-Alternativa d'Esquerres for Barcelona in the elections to the Parliament of Catalonia in 2012, with the aim of closing the constituency list, along with the football player Oleguer Presas and the writer Julià de Jòdar. In 2007 he was awarded the Creu de Sant Jordi and in 2013 he received the Lluís Companys Memorial Award from the Josep Irla Foundation. In 2019 he was also given the Medalla d’or al Mèrit Cívic (Gold Award for Civil Merit) from the city council of Barcelona.

In the 2015 municipal elections, he was candidate for the CUP-Capgirem Barcelona, once again with the aim of closing the list for Barcelona.

August Gil Matamala is currently part of Barcelona City Council's group of experts on the victims of the Franco regime in the city between 1960 and 1978.

In 2017, David Fernàndez and Anna Gabriel published August Gil Matamala's biography: Al principi de tot hi ha la guerra (At the Beginning of Everything is the War) with the publishing house Sembra Llibres.
