= Anna Gabriel i Sabaté =

Catalan teacher, activist, politician and trade unionist

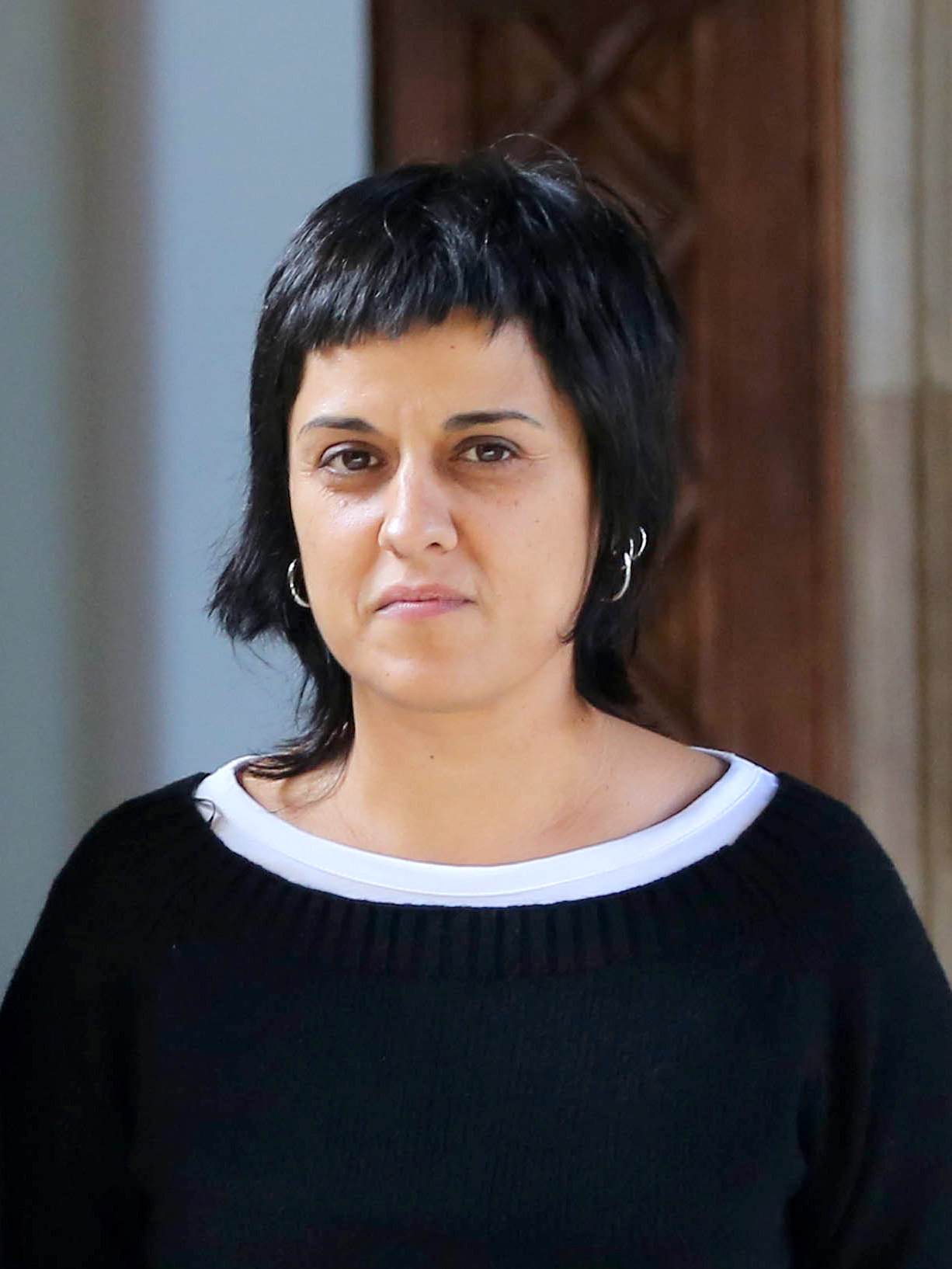
- Anna Gabriel i Sabaté in February 2016

MP of Parliament of Catalonia for the Province of Barcelona
- In office 26 October 2015 – 28 October 2017

Personal details
- Born: Anna Gabriel i Sabaté; 1975 (age 50–51) Sallent, Catalonia, Spain
- Citizenship: Spanish
- Party: Popular Unity Candidacy (CUP)
- Education: Autonomous University of Barcelona
- Occupation: Teacher; politician; trade union leader

Anna Gabriel i Sabaté (born 1975) is a Catalan social pedagogue, adjunct professor in law and politician from Spain. She was a member of Catalan Parliament between 2015 and 2017, representing the radical left pro-Catalan independence political party, Popular Unity Candidacy. Since February 2018, she has been in exile in Geneva, Switzerland.

== Early life ==
Gabriel was born in 1975 in Sallent de Llobregat, a working-class town located 70 km north of Barcelona, to a mining and trade union family originating in Southern Spain. Gabriel worked as a street educator before studying law and taking up a part-time teaching position at the Autonomous University of Barcelona, where she taught history of law. She became involved in political activities at the age of 16, when she joined an anti-fascist platform.

She graduated in social education and then law and completed a master's degree in social-labor rights at the Autonomous University of Barcelona. She has been a part-time instructor at the College of Law of the same university and has worked giving professional support of the Childcare Department of the Generalitat de Catalunya and the town councils of Manresa and Gironella.

After studying social education, she worked in different city councils and organizations as a street educator and participated in the setting up of the coordinating body for the Catalan Language Associations. She is a member of the General Confederation of Labour and Endavant. She has since 2002 been a member of the Popular Unity Candidacy (CUP), where she defends feminism as one of the fundamental pillars of the organisation.

== Political career ==
She was spokeswoman for the Catalan pro-Independence campaign "Independència per canviar-ho tot" (Independence to Change Everything) and councilor of the City Council of Sallent between the years 2003 and 2011. She stood as a candidate in the European Parliament elections in 2004 as number three for the CUP. During the 2012–2015 legislature in Catalonia, she worked as coordinator of the parliamentary group of the CUP. In the elections to the Parliament of Catalonia of 2015, she was elected deputy for Barcelona. From 2015 to 2017, she was parliamentary spokesperson for the CUP.

In 2017 she published, with David Fernàndez, the book Al principi de tot hi ha la guerra, based on August Gil Matamala's biography.

After the holding in 2017 of the Catalan independence referendum, called by the Generalitat de Catalunya, and declared illegal by the Constitutional Court of Spain, Gabriel was called to appear in front of the Spanish Supreme Court to give evidence about her participation in those events. On 20 February 2018, and now exiled in Switzerland, she stated in an interview to Le Temps that she would not show up for her court hearing as she did not anticipate a fair trial.

On 21 March 2018, the magistrate of the Supreme Court Pablo Llarena finally decided to reduce the charge to disobedience (article 410 of the Spanish Penal Code), an offense that does not entail a prison sentence.

According to an investigation by Citizen Lab, her phone was hacked using the Pegasus software from the NSO Group.

On 2 November 2021, Anna Gabriel was elected leader of the Swiss trade union, Unia. She was the first woman to be elected to the post. In July 2022 she voluntarily appeared before the Supreme Court of Spain to regularize her procedural situation.
