= Oleguer Presas =

Catalan footballer (born 1980)

Oleguer
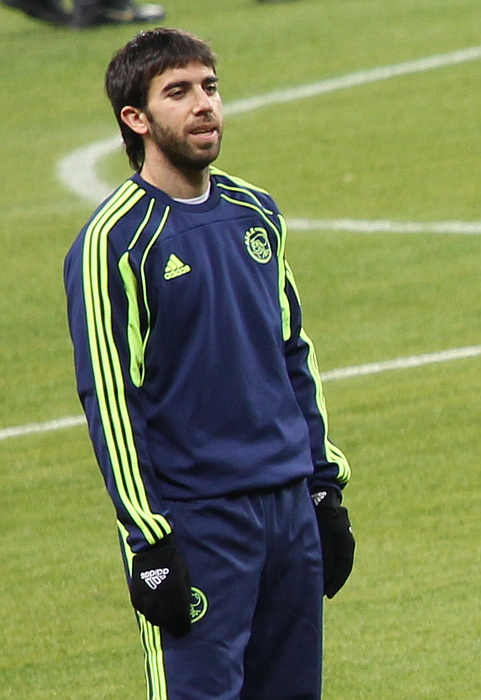
- Oleguer training with Ajax in 2011

Personal information
- Full name: Oleguer Presas Renom
- Date of birth: 2 February 1980 (age 46)
- Place of birth: Sabadell, Spain
- Height: 1.87 m (6 ft 1 1/2 in)
- Position: Defender

Youth career
- Lepanto
- Sant Gabriel
- 1997–1999: Gramenet

Senior career*
Years	Team	Apps	(Gls)
1999–2001	Gramenet	35	(2)
2001–2003	Barcelona B	68	(2)
2003–2008	Barcelona	127	(1)
2008–2011	Ajax	36	(2)
Total		266	(7)

International career
2004–2009	Catalonia	6	(0)
- * Club domestic league appearances and goals

Oleguer Presas Renom (born 2 February 1980), known simply as Oleguer, is a Catalan former professional footballer. Primarily a centre-back, he could also play as a defensive right-back.

During his career, he was mostly associated with Barcelona, with which he won two La Liga championships and the 2006 Champions League, appearing in 175 competitive matches. He signed for Ajax in 2008, where he remained until his retirement.

Oleguer was also known for his political approach; he supported left-wing causes and Catalan nationalism, which caused some controversy and led to one sponsor dropping him.

== Club career ==
=== Early career ===
Born in Sabadell, Barcelona, Catalonia, Oleguer started his career at modest CD Lepanto, a club from his hometown. In 1997, he joined neighbours UDA Gramenet from CE Sant Gabriel, making his senior debut two years later whilst at the service of the former.

=== Barcelona ===
At 21, Oleguer signed with FC Barcelona, spending his debut season with their reserves. He would make his first-team debut during a 2002–03 UEFA Champions League match against Galatasaray SK, a 3–1 home victory where he came on as a late substitute for Frank de Boer. During that season he played for both sides, on occasion being a last-minute addition to the main squad.

On 17 May 2006, Barça beat Arsenal to win the Champions League for the second time in their history. Oleguer started the match, but on the day he appeared tense and slow, struggling to neutralise Freddie Ljungberg's runs down the wing and more importantly not being able to stop Sol Campbell scoring the opening goal. In the 71st minute he was substituted in favour of Juliano Belletti by manager Frank Rijkaard, and the Brazilian went on to score the decider with less than ten minutes to go.

Oleguer signed a contract extension in July 2006, keeping him with the club until 2010. He had the honour of captaining the team for the first time in their first pre-season game but, with the arrival of Gianluca Zambrotta and Lilian Thuram, he found himself coming on from the bench in the first few matches of the campaign. On 29 November 2006, he was awarded the President Companys award for his efforts in promoting the official recognition of Catalan sports at an international level.

2007–08 started positively in sporting terms, as Oleguer became a fixture in Rijkaard's starting eleven. However, he was accused of assaulting a policeman during an incident in a bar in Sabadell which occurred in 2003. He also spoke out against the banning of the Catalan national team by the Royal Spanish Football Federation, when the former was scheduled to play a friendly against the United States in conjunction with FIFA-recognised international fixtures in that same week.

On 9 February 2008, in a La Liga match against Sevilla FC, Oleguer broke a bone in his left hand. He spent six weeks on the sidelines after undergoing surgery, taking almost no part in the team's season; Barcelona finished third, and his only competitive goal took place on 24 April 2005 when he opened the 4–0 away defeat of Málaga CF.

=== Ajax ===
On 29 July 2008, Oleguer signed a three-season deal with AFC Ajax, which paid €3 million plus 2.25 million in variables, including an option for another year. Manager Marco van Basten said: "I am happy that we have acquired Oleguer. His qualities fit exactly with what Ajax needs. We are all convinced of that. He has the right age, experience at a high level and is a real defender".

Oleguer scored a rare goal on 18 October 2008, the game's only in a home win over FC Groningen. He had an extended run during his first season due to injuries to teammates, but played mostly as backup to Belgian youngsters Toby Alderweireld and Jan Vertonghen.

After only appearing in seven official games for the Amsterdam team in 2010–11, the 31-year-old Oleguer was released.

== Personal life and politics ==
Oleguer majored in economics from the Autonomous University of Barcelona. On 30 March 2006 he published his first book with recollections on his youth, early career and the league triumph of 2004–05 (and the subsequent street parade through the Avinguda Diagonal in Barcelona). The book, called Camí d'Itaca (The Road to Ithaca), dealt with such varied subjects as childhood anorexia, the anti-fascist struggle and the previous Spanish government's involvement in both Gulf Wars.

Though injured just before the end of the 2005–06 season in a Champions League match and forced to miss the league-winning match against RC Celta de Vigo, Oleguer was able to return to the pitch to play in the next match at the Camp Nou when the trophy was presented to the team. True to form, he celebrated wrapped in the colors of the senyera estelada, the Catalan independence flag.

Oleguer had sympathies with left-wing and Catalan nationalist causes (La Bressola) and Escola Valenciana, and was asked by Subcomandante Marcos of the Zapatista Army of National Liberation to play a charity match in Chiapas, Mexico, during the summer of 2005. Later that year, he was invited to take part in a meeting of shortlisted players for the Spain national team, an invitation that he accepted only to tell manager Luis Aragonés he did not feel motivated enough to be selected.

On 7 February 2007, in an article written for Basque language newspaper Berria, Oleguer questioned the validity and independence of legal and judicial processes in the Spanish state, using the example of convicted ETA member Iñaki de Juana and his hunger strike to question those processes. His decision to write the article brought veiled criticism at Barcelona, both from coach Rijkaard and president Joan Laporta, as well as earning him disrespectful remarks from fellow professional Salva Ballesta, known for his Francoist views.

As a direct result of the article, Oleguer lost his boot sponsorship with sports firm Kelme, and he subsequently signed for Diadora. He also became the subject of a strong public backlash among some elements in Spain, and was regularly heckled and booed in some of the country's football stadiums due to the article and his pro-Catalan independence stance. When asked about whether he felt that he should not have written the piece, he replied, "The consequences I suffer are nothing compared to what many people go through. What did sadden me, though, was that most people didn't actually read the piece. If people engaged in dialogue with intelligence and still disagreed, then fine, but they didn't".

Oleguer later took Kelme to court, winning the case and being awarded €49,608 in compensation plus legal interest and the remainder of his contract. The company appealed, however, managing to overturn the original ruling in January 2009.

In 2010, Oleguer appeared at a protest in Amsterdam against the Dutch ban on squatting. His club Ajax had no problems with his presence, because he only participated in the peaceful sections of the protest.

Oleguer was chosen as the eighty-third candidate on the CUP-Alternativa d'Esquerres list for the Barcelona constituency in the 2012 Catalan regional election, with the aim of closing the list alongside writer Julià de Jòdar and lawyer August Gil Matamala, who were placed eighty-fourth and eighty-fifth respectively. One example of this support was shown by the publication of the article "Ho volem tot" (We want it all).

In the 2015 Spanish local elections, Oleguer joined the list for Crida per Sabadell in the twenty-third position, the same number he wore during his time at Barcelona. On 23 March 2018, the book La història de John Carlos, written by Carlos himself and Dave Zirin and edited by Sembra Llibres, was published, for which he wrote the foreword.

== Career statistics ==
Appearances and goals by club, season and competition
Club	Season	League			National Cup		Europe		Other		Total	
Club	Season	Division	Apps	Goals	Apps	Goals	Apps	Goals	Apps	Goals	Apps	Goals
Gramenet	1999–2000	Segunda División B	1	0	0	0	—		0	0	1	0
Gramenet	2000–01	Segunda División B	34	2	2	0	—		6 (Note: Appearances in Segunda División B play-offs)	0	42	2
Gramenet	Total		35	2	2	0	—		6	0	43	2
Barcelona B	2001–02	Segunda División B	28	0	—		—		6	0	34	0
Barcelona B	2002–03	Segunda División B	28	2	—		—		—		28	2
Barcelona B	2003–04	Segunda División B	12	0	—		—		—		12	0
Barcelona B	Total		68	2	—		—		6	0	74	2
Barcelona	2002–03	La Liga	3	0	0	0	2 (Note: Appearances in UEFA Champions League)	0	—		5	0
Barcelona	2003–04	La Liga	18	0	2	0	4 (Note: Appearances in UEFA Cup)	0	—		24	0
Barcelona	2004–05	La Liga	36	1	1	0	7	0	—		44	1
Barcelona	2005–06	La Liga	33	0	3	0	11	0	2 (Note: Appearances in Supercopa de España)	0	49	0
Barcelona	2006–07	La Liga	25	0	7	0	5	0	1	0	38	0
Barcelona	2007–08	La Liga	12	0	1	0	2	0	—		15	0
Barcelona	Total		127	1	14	0	31	0	3	0	175	1
Ajax	2008–09	Eredivisie	27	1	1	0	9	0	—		37	1
Ajax	2009–10	Eredivisie	6	0	2	0	5 (Note: Appearances in UEFA Europa League)	0	—		13	0
Ajax	2010–11	Eredivisie	3	1	1	0	3	0	1 (Note: Appearance in Johan Cruyff Shield)	0	8	1
Ajax	Total		36	2	4	0	17	0	1	0	58	2
Career total			266	7	20	0	48	0	16	0	350	7

== Honours ==
Barcelona

- La Liga: 2004–05, 2005–06
- Supercopa de España: 2005, 2006
- UEFA Champions League: 2005–06
- UEFA Super Cup runner-up: 2006
- FIFA Club World Cup runner-up: 2006

Ajax

- Eredivisie: 2010–11
- KNVB Cup: 2009–10
