= Manuel Delgado (disambiguation) =

Manuel Delgado may refer to:

- Manuel Delgado (born 1955) Spanish water polo player
- Manuel Delgado Barreto (1879–1936), Spanish journalist
- Manuel Delgado Parker (1936–2019), Peruvian entrepreneur who founded the media conglomerate Grupo RPP
- Manuel Delgado Ruiz (born 1956), Catalan anthropologist
- Manuel Delgado Villegas (1943–1998), Spanish serial killer
- Manuel Ruben Delgado (born 1940), Chicano activist and leader of the Third World Liberation Front strikes of 1968
