= Mireia Vehí =

Spanish sociologist and politician

Mireia Vehí MP
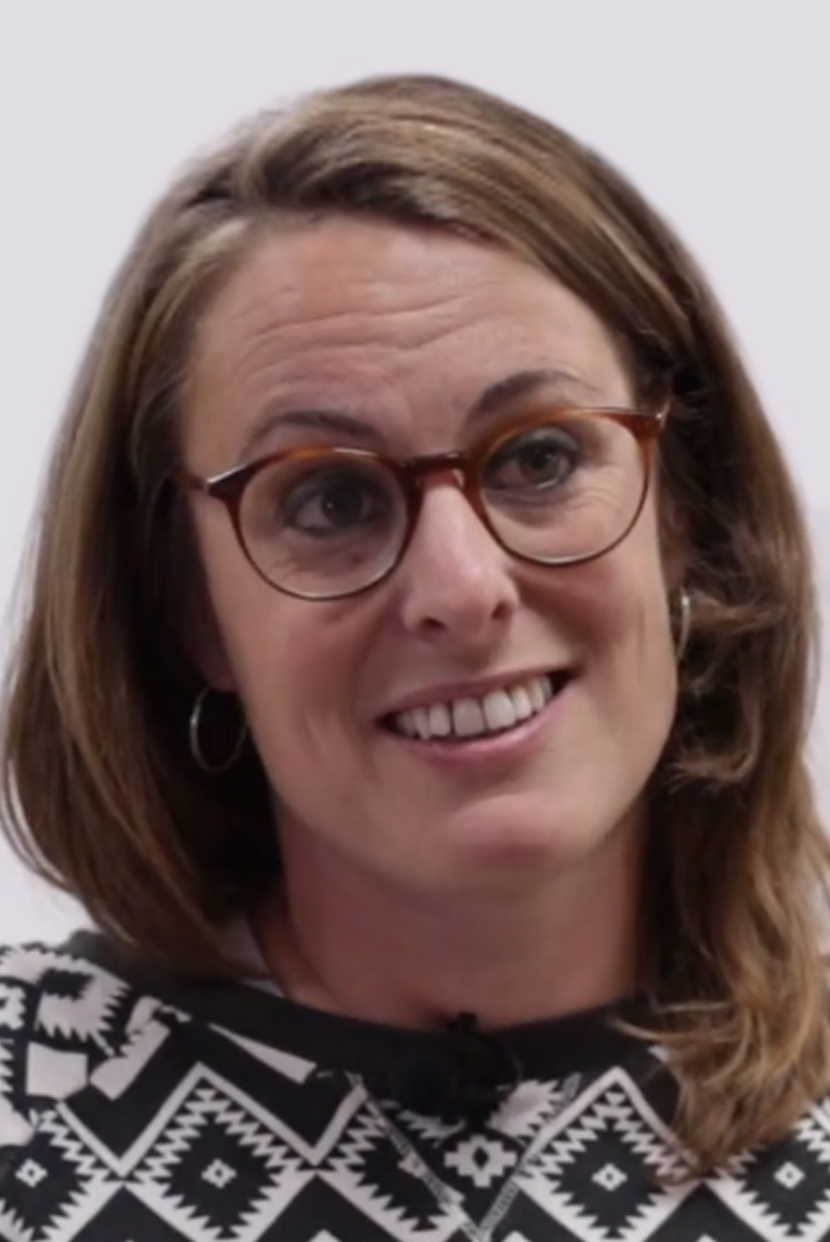
- Vehí in October 2019

Member of the Congress of Deputies
- In office 3 December 2019 – 17 August 2023
- Constituency: Barcelona

Member of the Parliament of Catalonia
- In office 19 January 2016 – 28 October 2017
- Preceded by: Julià de Jòdar
- Constituency: Barcelona

Personal details
- Born: Mireia Vehí i Cantenys; 9 February 1985 (age 41) Vilafant, Catalonia, Spain
- Citizenship: Spanish
- Party: Endavant
- Other political affiliations: Popular Unity Candidacy–For Rupture
- Education: University of Granada

Mireia Vehí i Cantenys (Catalan pronunciation: [miˈɾɛjə βəˈi j kənˈtɛɲs]; born 9 February 1985) is a Spanish sociologist and politician from Catalonia, who served as Member of the Congress of Deputies of Spain. She was previously a member of the Parliament of Catalonia.

== Early life and family ==
Vehí was born on 9 February 1985 in Vilafant, Catalonia. She is the daughter of Agustí Vehí i Castelló, a deputy inspector in the municipal police in Figueres, and Consol Cantenys i Arbolí, the socialist mayor of Vilafant. Her great-grandfather was a republican mayor. Her sisters Pau and Laia are musicians.

Vehí has a degree in sociology from the University of Granada (2010) and a postgraduate qualification in African societies and development from the Pompeu Fabra University (2011). She is currently studying for a master's degree in women's studies, gender and citizenship at the Inter-University Women and Gender Studies Institute.

== Career ==
Vehí is a specialist in migration, human rights, gender and multiculturalism and has worked for several organisations in this capacity. She worked on multicultural activities for Barcelona City Council and was a board member and project director of the Center for African and Intercultural Studies (Centre d'Estudis Africans i Interculturals). She has also taught security history at the School of Prevention and Comprehensive Security of the Autonomous University of Barcelona.

Vehí was part of the Occupy movement in Granada and Poble-sec. She has been active in the anti-capitalist movement since 2015 and is a member of various social movements. She was a spokesperson for the movement to close the immigration detention centre in Zona Franca (Tanquem els CIE).

Vehí is associated with the Endavant party and has been a member of Popular Unity Candidacy (CUP) since 2015. At the 2015 regional election she was placed eighth on CUP's list of candidates in the Province of Barcelona but the party only won seven seats in the province and as a result he failed to get elected. However, in January 2016, she was appointed to the Parliament of Catalonia following the resignation of Julià de Jòdar. In March 2016, on her way to Diyarbakır in Turkish Kurdistan to participate in marches to mark International Women's Day, Vehí was detained at Istanbul Airport and threatened with violence before being deported back to Barcelona.

At the 2017 regional election Vehí was placed 78th on CUP's list of candidates in the province of Barcelona but the party only won three seats in the province and as a result she failed to get re-elected. In February 2018 the Som Llavor, Construïm la Unitat Popular list backed by Endavant won six seats, including Vehí, on CUP's national secretariat.

Vehí contested the 2019 November general election as a Popular Unity Candidacy–For Rupture candidate in the Province of Barcelona and was elected to the Congress of Deputies. She contested the 2023 general elections again, this time in the Province of Girona, but was not elected as her party did not gain any seats.

== Electoral history ==
Electoral history of Mireia Vehí
Election	Constituency	Party	Alliance	No.	Result
2015 regional	Province of Barcelona	Endavant	Popular Unity Candidacy	8	Not elected
2017 regional	Province of Barcelona	Endavant	Popular Unity Candidacy	78	Not elected
2019 November general	Province of Barcelona	Endavant	Popular Unity Candidacy–For Rupture	1	Elected
2023 general	Province of Girona	Endavant	Popular Unity Candidacy–For Rupture	1	Not elected
