= Julià de Jòdar i Muñoz =

Spanish writer (born 1942)

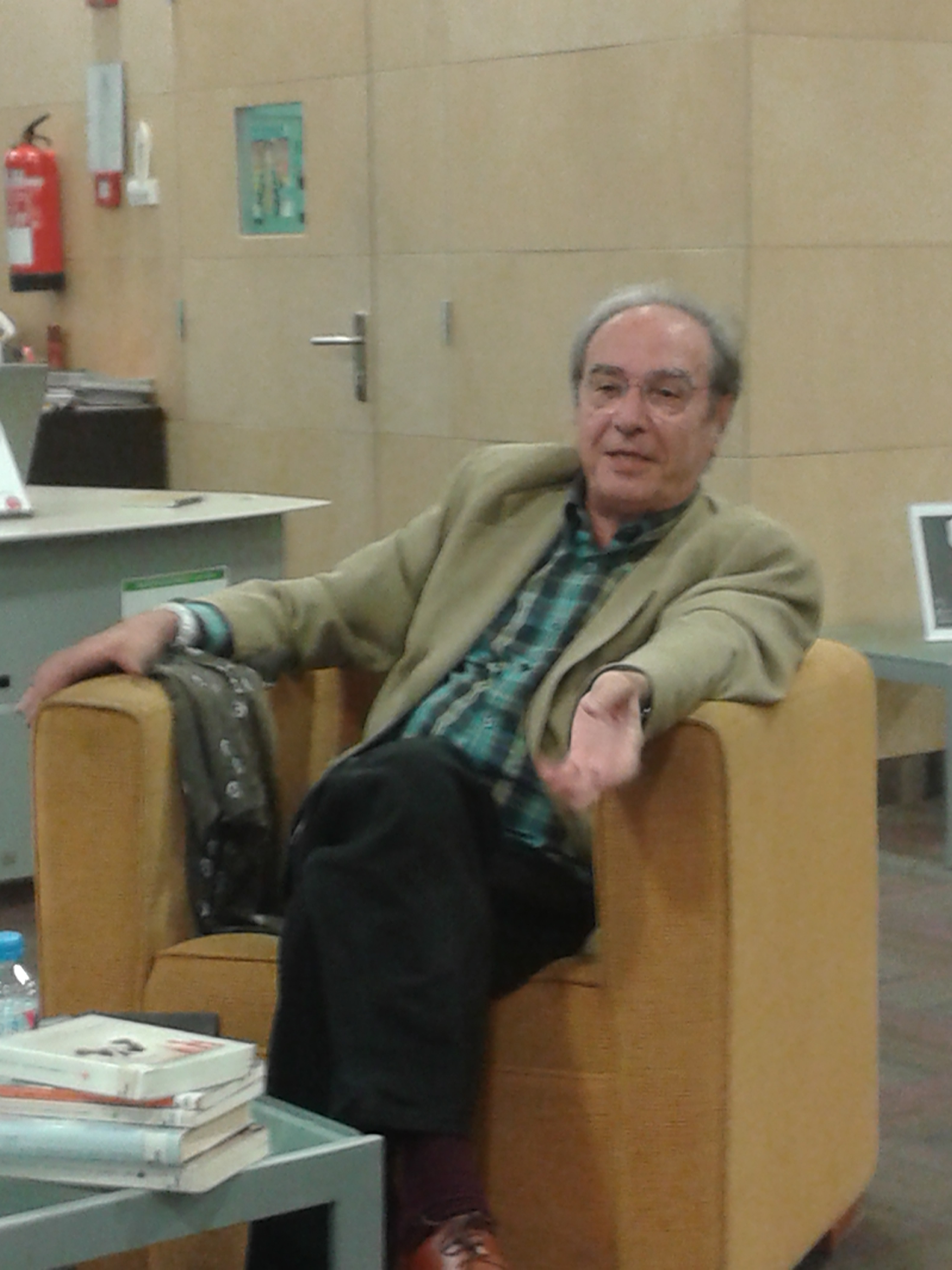
- Julia de Jòdar, 2014, in a debate in Salt
- Born: 28 December 1942 (age 83)
- Occupation: Writer
- Writing career
- Language: Catalan

Julià de Jòdar i Muñoz (Badalona, 28 December 1942), is a Spanish writer in Catalan.

== Biography ==
Julia de Jòdar was born in 1942 in Badalona and grew up in the neighborhood of Gorg of this city. Although he headed towards first to study engineering and obtained his diploma in Chemical Engineering −1964, then abandoned that way to study humanities. So he graduated in Modern and Contemporary History in 1973, and he studied theater at the School of Dramatic Art Adrià Gual. There was a member of the team Ricard Salvat. His major work is L'atzar i les ombres, a trilogy comprising the novels L'àngel de la segona mort, El trànsit de les fades and El metall impur. In 2009, with his novel Pastoral catalana, a sort of homage to the American writer Philip Roth and his American Pastoral, he received the Premi Carlemany given annually by the Government of Andorra.

Currently (2006), he collaborates weekly in the newspaper Avui, fortnightly in the newspaper El Punt, weekly in Elsingulardigital and, more sporadically in VilaWeb.

The 13 October 2012 was eighty-four chosen from the list of Alternative Left-CUP to Barcelona to the 2012 Catalan parliamentary election with the aim of closing the list of constituency, along with the footballer Oleguer Presas and the lawyer August Gil Matamala eighty-third and eighty-fifth respectively.

In 2012, he published, together with the journalist David Fernàndez, the book Cop de CUP.

== Works ==
=== Novels ===
- L'àngel de la segona mort. Barcelona: Quaderns Crema, 1997. Premi Ciutat de Barcelona 1998. ISBN 978-84-7727-185-7
- El trànsit de les fades. Barcelona: Quaderns Crema, 2001. Premi de la Crítica 2001. ISBN 978-84-7727-344-8
- L'home que va estimar Natàlia Vidal. Barcelona: Edicions 62, 2002. Prudenci Bertrana Prize 2003. ISBN 978-84-297-5347-9
- El metall impur. Barcelona: Proa, 2005. Premi Sant Jordi 2005. Premi Crítica Serra d'Or de novel·la 2007. ISBN 978-84-8437-858-7
- Noi, ¿has vist la mare amagada entre les ombres?. Barcelona: Proa, 2008. ISBN 978-84-8437-445-9
- La pastoral catalana. Barcelona: Proa, 2009. Premi Carlemany 2009. Premi Crítica Serra d'Or de novel·la 2011.

=== Short stories ===
- Zapata als Encants. Barcelona: Quaderns Crema, 1999. ISBN 978-84-7727-285-4

=== Other works ===
- Fot-li que som catalans, Barcelona: L'Esfera dels Llibres, 2005 (with Xavier Bru de Sala and Miquel de Palol).
- Fot-li més que encara som catalans, Barcelona: L'Esfera dels Llibres, 2006 (with Xavier Bru de Sala and Miquel de Palol).
- Directe al gra, Ed. Brosquil, 2007.
- Cop de CUP. Viatge a l'ànima i a les arrels de les Candidatures d'Unitat Popular, Barcelona: Columna Edicions, 2012 (with David Fernàndez).
