= 2004–05 FC Barcelona season =

106th season in existence of FC Barcelona

FC Barcelona
2004–05 season
- President: Joan Laporta
- Head Coach: Frank Rijkaard
- Stadium: Camp Nou
- La Liga: 1st
- Copa del Rey: Round of 64
- UEFA Champions League: Round of 16
- Top goalscorer: League: Samuel Eto'o (25); All: Samuel Eto'o (29)
Home colours	Away colours	Third colours

The 2004–05 season saw Futbol Club Barcelona end their six-year wait for the La Liga title, having not won the league or, indeed, any trophy since the 1998–99 season and thus La Liga trophy returned to Barcelona's trophy room. Having finished second in La Liga the previous season, Barcelona once again competed in the UEFA Champions League as well as the Copa del Rey. The squad was restructured significantly following the retirement of key players Luis Enrique and Marc Overmars, as well as the return of Edgar Davids to Juventus and first team regulars Patrick Kluivert and Phillip Cocu moving onto new clubs. Ronaldinho's and new signing Samuel Eto'o's performances won them places in FIFPro's XI of 2004–05. Ronaldinho was later named FIFA World Player of the Year for 2005 for the second time in succession and with the highest points total ever; Eto'o came third. This season was also notable for the debut of Lionel Messi.

== Players ==
=== Squad ===
Correct as of 30 September 2009. Note: Flags indicate national team as defined under FIFA eligibility rules; some limited exceptions apply. Players may hold more than one non-FIFA nationality.

No.	Pos.	Nation	Player
1	GK	ESP	Víctor Valdés
2	DF	BRA	Juliano Belletti
3	MF	BRA	Thiago Motta
4	DF	MEX	Rafael Márquez
5	DF	ESP	Carles Puyol (captain)
6	MF	ESP	Xavi
7	FW	SWE	Henrik Larsson
8	MF	FRA	Ludovic Giuly
9	FW	CMR	Samuel Eto'o
10	MF	BRA	Ronaldinho
11	FW	ARG	Maxi López
12	DF	NED	Giovanni van Bronckhorst
14	MF	ESP	Gerard
15	MF	BRA	Edmílson

No.	Pos.	Nation	Player
16	DF	BRA	Sylvinho
18	MF	ESP	Gabri
19	DF	ESP	Fernando Navarro
20	MF	POR	Deco
22	MF	ITA	Demetrio Albertini
23	DF	ESP	Oleguer
24	MF	ESP	Andrés Iniesta
25	GK	ESP	Albert Jorquera
28	GK	ESP	Rubén
30	FW	ARG	Lionel Messi
31	MF	ESP	Joan Verdú
32	DF	ESP	Damià
34	DF	ESP	Rodri
36	MF	ESP	Javito

==== In ====
No.	Pos.	Nat.	Name	Age	EU	Moving from	Type	Transfer window	Ends	Transfer fee	Source
22	MF	(Italy)	Albertini	32	EU	Atalanta (Italy)	Transfer	Winter	2005	Free	
11	FW	(Argentina)	Maxi López	20	Non-EU	River Plate (Argentina)	Transfer	Winter	2009	€6.7M	
8	MF	(France)	Giuly	27	EU	Monaco (France)	Transfer	Summer	2007	€8.5M	
15	MF	(Brazil)	Edmílson	28	EU	Lyon (France)	Transfer	Summer	2008	€8M	
2	DF	(Brazil)	Belletti	27	Non-EU	Villarreal	Transfer	Summer	2007	€3.7M	
17	FW	(Sweden)	Larsson	32	EU	Celtic (Scotland)	Transfer	Summer	2005	Free	
20	MF	(Portugal)	Deco	26	EU	Porto (Portugal)	Transfer	Summer	2008	€21m	
16	DF	(Brazil)	Sylvinho	28	EU	Celta de Vigo	Transfer	Summer	2009	€2M	
9	FW	(Cameroon)	Eto'o	23	EU	Mallorca	Transfer	Summer	2008	€24M	
25	GK	(Spain)	Albert Jorquera	25	EU	Barcelona B	Promoted	Summer	2008	Free	
32	FW	(Spain)	Damià	22	EU	Barcelona B	Promoted	Summer	2008	Free	
30	FW	(Argentina)	Lionel Messi	16	EU	Barcelona B	Promoted	Summer	2008	Free	

Total spending: ▼€74.2 million

==== Out ====
No.	Pos.	Nat.	Name	Age	EU	Moving to	Type	Transfer window	Transfer fee	Source
8	MF	(Netherlands)	Cocu	33	EU	PSV (Netherlands)	Contract terminated	Summer	Free	
9	FW	(Netherlands)	Kluivert	28	EU	Newcastle United (England)	Contract terminated	Summer	Free	
2	DF	(Netherlands)	Reiziger	31	EU	Middlesbrough (England)	Contract terminated	Summer	Free	
22	MF	(Spain)	Luis García	26	EU	Liverpool (England)	Transfer	Summer	€8.75M	
11	MF	(Netherlands)	Overmars	31	EU		Retired	Summer	N/A	
21	FW	(Spain)	Luis Enrique	34	EU		Retired	Summer	N/A	
20	MF	(Portugal)	Quaresma	22	EU	Porto (Portugal)	Swap	Summer	€6M	
25	GK	(Germany)	Enke	26	EU	Hannover 96 (Germany)	Transfer	Summer	Free	
36	FW	(Spain)	Sergio García	20	EU	Levante	Transfer	Summer	Free	
1	GK	(Turkey)	Rüştü	31	Non-EU	Fenerbahçe (Turkey)	Loan	Summer	N/A	
7	FW	(Argentina)	Saviola	24	EU	Monaco (France)	Loan	Summer	N/A	
3	MF	(Netherlands)	Davids	31	EU	Juventus (Italy)	Loan ended	Summer	N/A	
27	DF	(Spain)	Óscar	23	EU	Lazio (Italy)	Loan	Summer	N/A	

Total income: ▲€14.75 million

Last updated: 30 September

== Competitions ==
=== La Liga ===
==== League table ====
Pos	Team	Pld	W	D	L	GF	GA	GD	Pts	Qualification or relegation
1	Barcelona (C)	38	25	9	4	73	29	+44	84	Qualification for the Champions League group stage
2	Real Madrid	38	25	5	8	71	32	+39	80	Qualification for the Champions League group stage
3	Villarreal	38	18	11	9	69	37	+32	65	Qualification for the Champions League third qualifying round
4	Real Betis	38	16	14	8	62	50	+12	62	Qualification for the Champions League third qualifying round
5	Espanyol	38	17	10	11	54	46	+8	61	Qualification for the UEFA Cup first round

Source: LFP
Rules for classification: 1st points; 2nd head-to-head points; 3rd head-to-head goal difference; 4th head-to-head goals scored; 5th goal difference; 6th number of goals scored; 7th Fair-play points
(C) Champions

==== Results by Round ====
Round	1	2	3	4	5	6	7	8	9	10	11	12	13	14	15	16	17	18	19	20	21	22	23	24	25	26	27	28	29	30	31	32	33	34	35	36	37	38
Ground	A	H	A	H	A	H	A	H	A	H	A	H	A	H	A	H	H	A	H	H	A	H	A	H	A	H	A	H	A	H	A	H	A	H	A	A	H	A
Result	W	W	D	W	W	W	W	W	D	W	L	W	W	W	W	D	W	L	W	W	W	L	W	W	D	D	W	W	W	D	L	W	W	W	W	D	D	D
Position	3	2	3	2	2	1	1	1	1	1	1	1	1	1	1	1	1	1	1	1	1	1	1	1	1	1	1	1	1	1	1	1	1	1	1	1	1	1

Updated to match(es) played on 2008-07-16. Source: LFP.com
A = Away; H = Home; W = Win; D = Draw; L = Loss; = Leader, 2005-06 UEFA Champions League Group stage; = 2005-06 UEFA Champions League Group stage; = 2005-06 UEFA Champions League Qualifying round; = 2005-06 UEFA Cup; = 2005-06 Segunda Division

==== Matches ====
29 August 2004 1	Racing Santander	0–2	Barcelona	Santander
			Giuly 68'; Eto'o 74'	Stadium: El Sardinero

11 September 2004 2	Barcelona	2–0	Sevilla	Barcelona
	Giuly 35'; Larsson 79'			Stadium: Camp Nou

19 September 2004 3	Atlético de Madrid	1–1	Barcelona	Madrid
	F. Torres 48'		Van Bronckhorst 22'	Stadium: Estadio Vicente Calderón

23 September 2004 4	Barcelona	4–1	Zaragoza	Barcelona
	Eto'o 26'; Eto'o 46'; Xavi 66'; Van Bronckhorst 78'			Stadium: Camp Nou

26 September 2004 5	Mallorca	1–3	Barcelona	Palma de Mallorca
			Larsson 10'; Eto'o 38', Eto'o 39'	Stadium: Son Moix

3 October 2004 6	Barcelona	1–0	Numancia	Barcelona
	Larsson 70'			Stadium: Camp Nou

16 October 2004 7	Espanyol	0–1	Barcelona	Cornellá de Llobregat
			Deco 9'	Stadium: Estadio Olímpico Lluís Companys

24 October 2004 8	Barcelona	3–0	Osasuna	Barcelona
	Eto'o 40'; Ronaldinho 42'; Eto'o 90'			Stadium: Camp Nou

30 October 2004 9	Athletic Bilbao	1–1	Barcelona	Bilbao
			Eto'o 10'	Stadium: San Mamés Stadium (1913)

6 November 2004 10	Barcelona	2–1	Deportivo	Barcelona
	Xavi 22'; Eto'o 35'			Stadium: Camp Nou

14 November 2004 11	Real Betis	2–1	Barcelona	Sevilla
			71' Gerard	Stadium: Estadio Benito Villamarin

20 November 2004 12	Barcelona	3–0	Real Madrid	Barcelona
	Eto'o 23'; Van Bronckhorst 42'; Ronaldinho 75' (pen.)			Stadium: Camp Nou

27 November 2004 13	Getafe	1–2	Barcelona	Madrid
			Márquez 20'; Deco 22'	Stadium: Coliseum Alfonso Pérez

4 December 2004 14	Barcelona	4–0	Málaga	Barcelona
	Eto'o 24'; Deco 28'; Iniesta 60'; Eto'o 89'			Stadium: Camp Nou

11 December 2004 15	Albacete	1–2	Barcelona	Albacete
			Iniesta 1'; Xavi 85'

18 December 2004 16	Barcelona	1–1	Valencia	Barcelona
	Ronaldinho 79'			Stadium: Camp Nou

21 December 2004 17	Barcelona	2–1	Levante	Barcelona
	Deco 35'; Eto'o 86'			Stadium: Camp Nou

9 January 2005 18	Villarreal	3–0	Barcelona	Villarreal
				Stadium: Estadio de la Cerámica

16 January 2005 19	Barcelona	1–0	Real Sociedad	Barcelona
	Eto'o 80'			Stadium: Camp Nou

22 January 2005 20	Barcelona	3–0	Racing Santander	Barcelona
	Eto'o 7'; Ronaldinho 74'; Deco 76'			Stadium: Camp Nou

29 January 2005 21	Sevilla	0–4	Barcelona	Sevilla
			Eto'o 48'; Baptista 55' (own goal); Ronaldinho 57'; Giuly 74'	Stadium: Estadio Ramón Sánchez Pizjuán

1 February 2005 22	Barcelona	0–2	Atlético Madrid	Barcelona
			F. Torres 1', 90' (pen.)	Stadium: Camp Nou

12 February 2005 23	Zaragoza	1–4	Barcelona	Zaragoza
			Toledo 1' (own goal); Giuly 29'; Eto'o 39'; Márquez 71'	Stadium: Estadio La Romareda

19 February 2005 24	Barcelona	2–0	Mallorca	Barcelona
	Deco 16'; Deco 56'			Stadium: Camp Nou

26 February 2005 25	Numancia	1–1	Barcelona	Soria
			Márquez 46'	Stadium: Nuevo Estadio Los Pajaritos

1 March 2005 26	Barcelona	0–0	Espanyol	Barcelona
				Stadium: Camp Nou

5 March 2005 27	Osasuna	0–1	Barcelona	Pamplona
			Eto'o 39'	Stadium: El Sadar

12 March 2005 28	Barcelona	2–0	Athletic Bilbao	Barcelona
	Deco 20'; Giuly 38'			Stadium: Camp Nou

19 March 2005 29	Deportivo	0–1	Barcelona	La Coruña
			Giuly 10'	Stadium: Riazor

3 April 2005 30	Barcelona	3–3	Real Betis	Barcelona
	Eto'o 14'; Eto'o 82'; Van Bronckhorst 90'			Stadium: Camp Nou

10 April 2005 31	Real Madrid	4–2	Barcelona	Madrid
	Zidane 7'; Ronaldo 20'; Raúl 45'; Owen 65'		Eto'o 28'; Ronaldinho 73'	Stadium: Estadio Santiago Bernabéu

17 April 2005 32	Barcelona	2–0	Getafe	Barcelona
	Ronaldinho 29'; Giuly 56'			Stadium: Camp Nou

24 April 2005 33	Málaga	0–4	Barcelona	Málaga
			Oleguer 21'; Giuly 33'; Giuly 67'; Gerard 89'	Stadium: La Rosaleda

1 May 2005 34	Barcelona	2–0	Albacete	Barcelona
	Eto'o 66'; Messi 88'			Stadium: Camp Nou

8 May 2005 35	Valencia	0–2	Barcelona	Valencia
			Ronaldinho 28'; Eto'o 29'	Stadium: Mestalla

14 May 2005 36	Levante	1–1	Barcelona	Valencia
			Eto'o 60'	Stadium: Estadi Ciutat de València

22 May 2005 37	Barcelona	3–3	Villarreal	Barcelona
	Ronaldinho 34'; Giuly 37'; Giuly 48'			Stadium: Camp Nou

28 May 2005 38	Real Sociedad	0–0	Barcelona	San Sebastián
				Stadium: Anoeta

=== Copa del Rey ===
==== Round of 64 ====
27 October 2004 Round of 64	UDA Gramenet	1–0 (a.e.t.)	Barcelona	Nou Camp Municipal, Santa Coloma de Gramenet
20:45 CET	Ollés 103'	Report		Referee: Daudén Ibáñez

=== Champions League ===
==== Group stage ====
14 September 2004	Celtic (Scotland)	1–3	(Spain) Barcelona	Celtic Park, Glasgow
20:45	Sutton 59'	Report	Deco 20'; Giuly 78'; Larsson 82'	Attendance: 58,589; Referee: Markus Merk (Germany)

29 September 2004	Barcelona (Spain)	3–0	(Ukraine) Shakhtar Donetsk	Camp Nou, Barcelona
20:45	Deco 15'; Ronaldinho 64' (pen.); Eto'o 89'	Report		Attendance: 64,148; Referee: Terje Hauge (Norway)

20 October 2004	Milan (Italy)	1–0	(Spain) Barcelona	San Siro, Milan
20:45	Shevchenko 31'	Report		Attendance: 76,502; Referee: Graham Poll (England)

2 November 2004	Barcelona (Spain)	2–1	(Italy) Milan	Camp Nou, Barcelona
20:45	Eto'o 37'; Ronaldinho 89'	Report	Shevchenko 17'	Attendance: 94,682; Referee: Urs Meier (Switzerland)

24 November 2004	Barcelona (Spain)	1–1	(Scotland) Celtic	Camp Nou, Barcelona
20:45	Eto'o 24'	Report	Hartson 45'	Attendance: 74,119; Referee: Ľuboš Micheľ (Slovakia)

7 December 2004	Shakhtar Donetsk (Ukraine)	2–0	(Spain) Barcelona	Donbas Arena, Donetsk
20:45	Aghahowa 14', 22'	Report		Attendance: 25,000; Referee: Claus Bo Larsen (Denmark)

==== Round of 16 ====
23 February 2005	Barcelona (Spain)	2–1	(England) Chelsea	Camp Nou, Barcelona
	M. López 67'; Eto'o 73'	Report	Belletti 33' (o.g.)	Attendance: 96,650; Referee: Anders Frisk (Sweden)

8 March 2005	Chelsea (England)	4–2 (5–4 agg.)	(Spain) Barcelona	Stamford Bridge, London
	Guðjohnsen 8'; Lampard 17'; Duff 19'; Terry 76'	Report	Ronaldinho 27' (pen.), 38'	Attendance: 42,450; Referee: Pierluigi Collina (Italy)

== Statistics ==
=== Players statistics ===
No.	Pos	Nat	Player	Total		La Liga		Copa del Rey		Champions League	
No.	Pos	Nat	Player	Apps	Goals	Apps	Goals	Apps	Goals	Apps	Goals
1	GK	(Spain) ESP	Valdes	43	-36	35	-25	0	0	8	-11
2	DF	(Brazil) BRA	Belletti	39	0	29+2	0	0	0	8	0
23	DF	(Spain) ESP	Oleguer	43	1	33+3	1	0	0	5+2	0
5	DF	(Spain) ESP	Puyol	45	0	36	0	1	0	8	0
12	DF	(Netherlands) NED	van Bronckhorst	38	4	27+2	4	1	0	7+1	0
4	MF	(Mexico) MEX	Marquez	41	3	33+1	3	1	0	5+1	0
6	MF	(Spain) ESP	Xavi	45	3	36	3	1	0	8	0
20	MF	(Portugal) POR	Deco	42	9	35	7	0	0	7	2
8	FW	(France) FRA	Giuly	36	12	29	11	1	0	5+1	1
9	FW	(Cameroon) CMR	Eto'o	45	29	37	25	0+1	0	7	4
10	FW	(Brazil) BRA	Ronaldinho	42	13	35	9	0	0	7	4
28	GK	(Spain) ESP	Rubén	3	-2	1+1	-1	1	-1		
24	MF	(Spain) ESP	Iniesta	46	2	12+25	2	1	0	2+6	0
16	DF	(Brazil) BRA	Sylvinho	24	0	11+10	0	0	0	2+1	0
7	FW	(Sweden) SWE	Larsson	17	4	6+6	3	1	0	1+3	1
32	DF	(Spain) ESP	Damià	10	0	5+4	0	0+1	0		
15	MF	(Brazil) BRA	Edmílson	7	0	4+2	0	0	0	1	0
3	MF	(Brazil) BRA	Motta	8	0	3+5	0				
14	MF	(Spain) ESP	Gerard	16	2	2+11	2	0	0	2+1	0
11	FW	(Argentina) ARG	Maxi	10	1	2+6	0	0	0	0+2	1
18	MF	(Spain) ESP	Gabri	4	0	2+2	0				
19	DF	(Spain) ESP	Navarro	8	0	2+3	0	1	0	1+1	0
25	GK	(Spain) ESP	Jorquera	2	-3	2	-3				
22	MF	(Italy) ITA	Albertini	6	0	1+4	0	0	0	1	0
30	FW	(Argentina) ARG	Messi	9	1	0+7	1	1	0	1	0
31	MF	(Spain) ESP	Verdu	2	0	0	0	0+1	0	1	0
34	DF	(Spain) ESP	Rodri	2	0	0+1	0	0	0	0+1	0
36	MF	(Spain) ESP	Javito	1	0	0	0	0	0	1	0

== Friendlies ==
GAMES 2004–2005
16-07-2004 Friendly. Banyoles 1–1 Barcelona

18-07-2004 Friendly. Figueres 1–2 Barcelona

20-07-2004 Friendly. Palamós 0–6 Barcelona

23-07-2004 30th anniversary of the José Rico Pérez stadium. Hércules 1–1 Barcelona

29-07-2004 Friendly. Suwon Samsung Bluewings 1–0 Barcelona

01-08-2004 Friendly. Kashima Antlers 0–5 Barcelona

04-08-2004 Friendly. Júbilo Iwata 0–3 Barcelona.

08-08-2004 Friendly. Shanghai United 0–3 Barcelona

14-08-2004 Cardiff Capital Challenge Match. Parma 0–1 Barcelona.

18-08-2004 Centenary of FC Vilafranca. Vilafranca 0–6 Barcelona

20-08-2004 Copa Catalunya (semifinal). Peralada 0–4 Barcelona

22-08-2004 Copa Catalunya (final). Espanyol 0–2 Barcelona

25-08-2005 Joan Gamper Trophy. Barcelona 2–1 Milan.

07-10-2005 Friendly. Marseille 0–0 Barcelona

14-12-2004 Friendly. Barcelona 2–1 Ajax

02-06-2005 Friendly. Lleida 3–3 Barcelona

12-06-2005 Friendly. Yokohama F. Marinos 3–3 Barcelona

15-06-2005 Friendly. Urawa Red Diamonds 0–3 Barcelona

== See also ==
- FC Barcelona
- 2004–05 UEFA Champions League
- 2004–05 La Liga
- 2004–05 Copa del Rey
