= Juliano Belletti =

Brazilian football coach (born 1976)

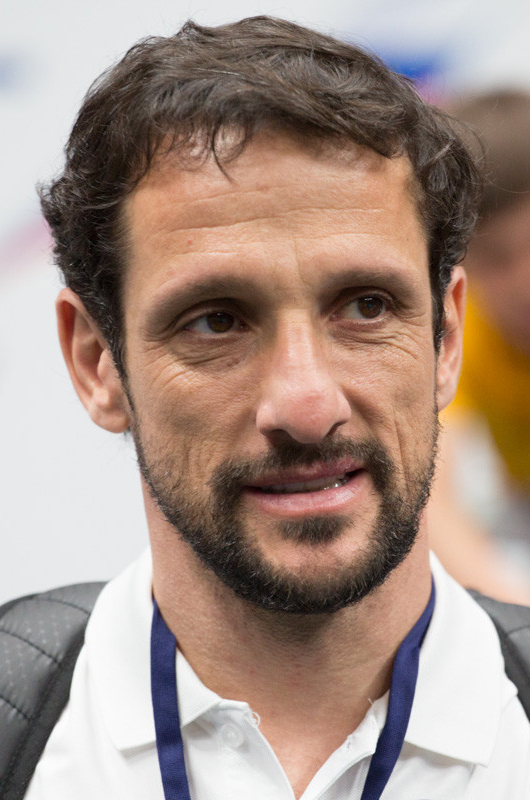
- Belletti in 2018

Personal information
- Full name: Juliano Haus Belletti
- Date of birth: 20 June 1976 (age 50)
- Place of birth: Cascavel, Brazil
- Height: 1.74 m (5 ft 9 in)
- Position: Right-back

Team information
- Current team: Barcelona B (head coach)

Youth career
- 1992–1994: Cruzeiro

Senior career*
Years	Team	Apps	(Gls)
1994–1996	Cruzeiro	22	(0)
1996–2002	São Paulo	54	(4)
1999	→ Atlético Mineiro (loan)	17	(5)
2002–2004	Villarreal	59	(6)
2004–2007	Barcelona	71	(0)
2007–2010	Chelsea	54	(5)
2010–2011	Fluminense	9	(0)
Total		286	(21)

International career
2001–2005	Brazil	23	(1)

Managerial career
- 2023: São Paulo U20
- 2024–2025: Barcelona U19
- 2025–: Barcelona B
Medal record
Men's football
Representing Brazil
FIFA World Cup
Winner	2002
- * Club domestic league appearances and goals

Juliano Haus Belletti (born 20 June 1976) is a Brazilian football coach and former player who mostly played as a right-back. He is currently the head coach at Barcelona Atlètic.

Belletti began his career in the Campeonato Brasileiro Série A with Cruzeiro, São Paulo and Atlético Mineiro, being awarded the Silver Ball by Placar for his performances on loan at the last of those clubs during the 1999 season. From 2002 to 2010 he played in Europe with Villarreal, Barcelona and Chelsea, winning numerous honours; his only goal for Barcelona won them the UEFA Champions League in 2006. He then returned to Brazil, winning the national league with Fluminense in 2010.

He earned 23 caps for Brazil from 2001 to 2005, scoring once. He was part of their teams that won the 2002 FIFA World Cup and competed at the 2001 Copa América and 2003 FIFA Confederations Cup.

== Early and personal life ==
Belletti was born in Cascavel, Paraná. He is of Italian ancestry and his family has its origins in Longiano in the Province of Forlì-Cesena, and he holds an Italian passport. He also has origins in Bastiglia in the Province of Modena and Mantua.

== Club career ==
=== Early career ===
Belletti started his career playing as a central midfielder in Brazil for the youth team of Cruzeiro in 1992. His professional debut happened in November 1994. In March 1996, he was involved in a deal that sent him and Serginho to São Paulo in exchange for five players: Aílton, Donizete, Gilmar, Palhinha and Vítor. Playing for São Paulo, he eventually became a right-back.

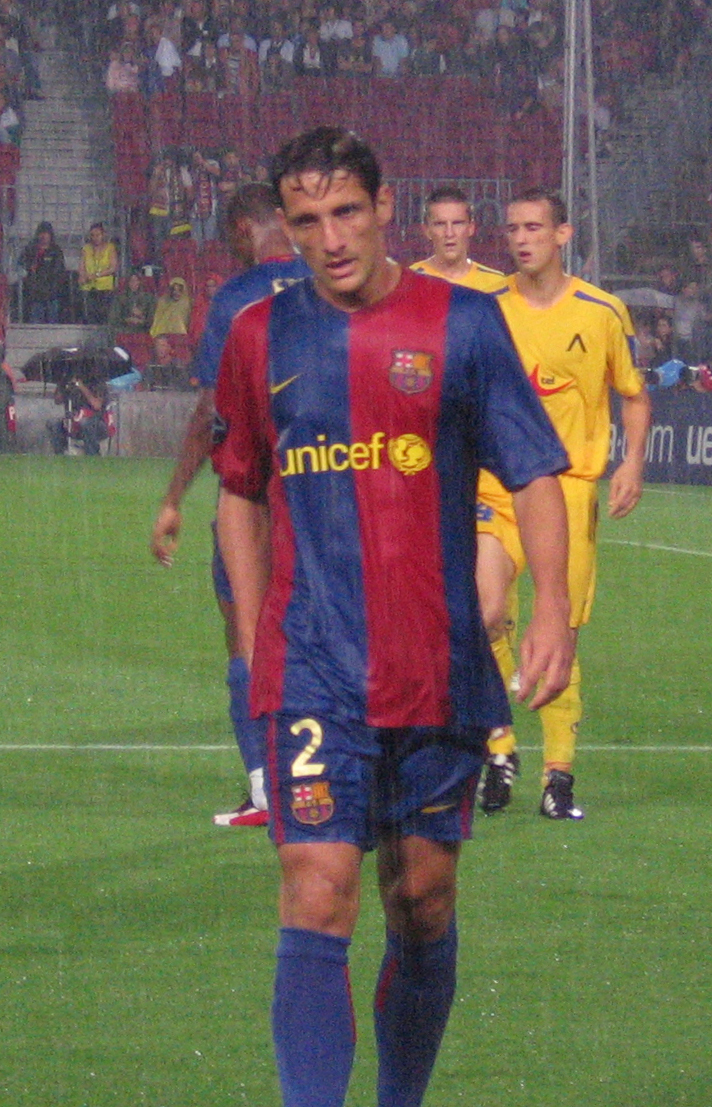
Belletti playing for Barcelona in 2006

In 1999, he was loaned to Atlético Mineiro. Playing as an attacking-midfielder, Belletti helped the club to finish second in the Brazilian League and managed to win the Bola de Prata ("Silver Ball"), an award handed by Placar magazine to the players nominated to the Brazilian League Squad of the Year.

After returning to São Paulo, he became a regular in the Brazil national team by playing in the right-back position once again.

=== Villarreal ===
In June 2002, prior to winning the World Cup with Brazil, Belletti moved to La Liga club Villarreal on a five-year deal for an estimated fee of US$3 million. He made his debut on 21 July in a 2–0 loss at Torino in the UEFA Intertoto Cup first round, playing the final 21 minutes in place of Jorge López.

Belletti was part of the squad that won the 2003 UEFA Intertoto Cup against Dutch club Heerenveen. On 15 February 2004, he scored twice at home to Racing Santander in a 6–3 victory.

=== Barcelona ===
In May 2004, Belletti transferred to Barcelona for €4 million on a three-year deal, with Barcelona also ceding their right to buy Pepe Reina back from Villarreal. He was signed to replace Michael Reiziger, whose contract was expiring.

Belletti's first and only goal with Barcelona was the winner in the 2006 UEFA Champions League final against Arsenal on 17 May, when he came on as a substitute for Oleguer Presas. His third season was marked by injuries, and competition from new rival Gianluca Zambrotta proved too much for him; he played very little as the campaign ended without silverware. Nonetheless, in March 2007, he extended his deal until 2009.

=== Chelsea ===
On 23 August 2007, Chelsea signed Belletti on a three-year deal for £4 million. The club had previously been trying to sign his compatriot Dani Alves, who went to Barcelona. He made his Premier League debut two days later as a 64th-minute substitute for Mikel John Obi in a 4–0 home win over Portsmouth. He became the starting right-back, ahead of Paulo Ferreira.

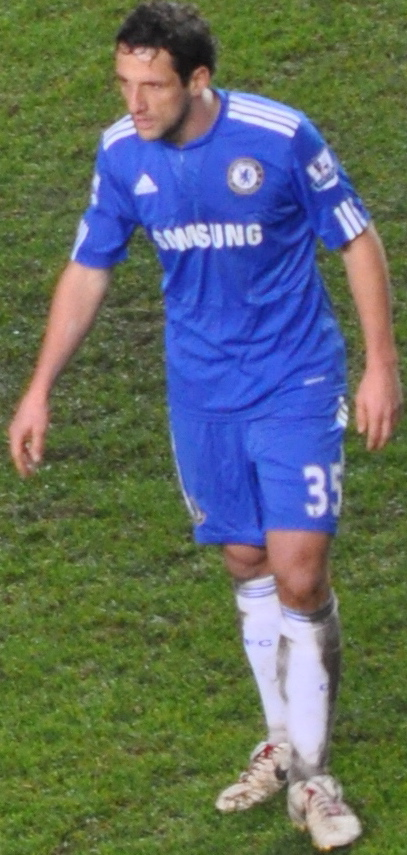
Belletti playing for Chelsea in 2010

In his first season at Chelsea, Belletti scored two goals, both from long-range, the first away at Wigan Athletic in November and the second at Stamford Bridge against Tottenham Hotspur on 12 January 2008. On 21 May, in the 2008 Champions League final against Manchester United at the Luzhniki Stadium in Moscow, he came on as a substitute just before the penalty shoot-out, in which he scored though his team lost.

Under compatriot new manager Luiz Felipe Scolari in 2008–09, Belletti was used as a utility player, in the central midfield and defensive midfield positions. On 18 October, he scored from 30 yards into the top corner against Middlesbrough in a 5–0 win at the Riverside Stadium, his fourth league goal for the club. The following 17 January, he scored a late equaliser as the team came from behind to win 2–1 at home to Stoke City.

A year later, in January 2010, Belletti was linked with a move to Flamengo in his native Brazil, but the Blues rejected their offer. On 27 February, he was sent off for a professional foul on Manchester City midfielder Gareth Barry to concede a penalty in a 4–2 loss at Stamford Bridge. Belletti came on as a substitute in the final game of the 2009–10 Premier League season, where a Chelsea win ensured they won the title. A week later, he came on as a substitute for the injured Michael Ballack in the 2010 FA Cup final against Portsmouth. He gave away a penalty with a foul on Kevin-Prince Boateng, which the Ghanaian missed as Chelsea won 1–0.

On 9 June 2010, Chelsea announced that Belletti was one of three players whose contract would not be renewed at the end of the month, alongside Joe Cole and Ballack. He made a total of 94 appearances, scoring five goals.

=== Fluminense ===
Following his release from Chelsea, he signed a two-year contract for Fluminense back in Brazil on 14 July 2010.

Struggling with several injuries and being unable to find a spot in the starting line-up, Belletti had his contract ended on 15 March 2011. He played nine matches with Fluminense, starting only three.

On 15 June 2011, Belletti signed a one-year contract with Ceará but just 12 days later, he retired due to an Achilles tendon injury.

== International career ==
Belletti made his international debut for Brazil on 28 March 2001 in a 1–0 loss away to Ecuador in the 2002 FIFA World Cup qualification. In July, he went to the 2001 Copa América in Colombia, where he scored his first, and only international goal in a 3–1 win against Paraguay, but netted an own goal in a shock defeat to last-minute invitees Honduras as the team suffered a quarter-final exit. The team bounced back to win the World Cup in Japan and South Korea, with Belletti playing the semi-final match against Turkey after replacing Kléberson for the final five minutes of the 1–0 win en route to the title. Belletti's international career was limited by sharing his position with the team's captain, Cafu.

Belletti played at the 2003 FIFA Confederations Cup but missed the 2005 edition due to a right Achilles tendon injury. As Cafu also did not play at this tournament, their places on the team were given to Cicinho and Maicon who later became dominant players at this position.

== Coaching career ==
On 4 February 2021, Belletti was named assistant at his first club Cruzeiro, after previously working in the club's International Business section. On 31 July, he was in charge of the club's first team trainings after the departure of Mozart, but returned to previous duties on 3 August after the appointment of Vanderlei Luxemburgo.

Belletti had his first experience as a head coach in 2023, with São Paulo FC under-20 team, when he arrived to replace Alex. He remained in the position until June 2023, when he claimed family adjustment problems upon his return to Brazil. In July 2024, he was announced for the same role, in the Barcelona U19 team. Belletti's first season in charge of Barcelona U19 was successful, with his team winning the Copa del Rey Juvenil de Fútbol on 16 March 2025, and later winning the UEFA Youth League on 28 April.

On 30 May 2025, Belletti was appointed manager of FC Barcelona Atlètic, freshly relegated to Segunda Federación.

== Career statistics ==
=== Club ===
Appearances and goals by club, season and competition
Club	Season	League			Cup		League Cup		Continental		Other		Total	
Club	Season	Division	Apps	Goals	Apps	Goals	Apps	Goals	Apps	Goals	Apps	Goals	Apps	Goals
Villarreal	2002–03	La Liga	31	3	—		—		6 (Note: Appearances in UEFA Intertoto Cup)	0	—		37	3
Villarreal	2003–04	La Liga	28	3	1	1	—		15 (Note: Ten appearances in UEFA Cup, five appearances in UEFA Intertoto Cup)	0	—		44	4
Villarreal	Total		59	6	1	1	—		21	0	—		81	7
Barcelona	2004–05	La Liga	31	0	—		—		8 (Note: Appearances in UEFA Champions League)	0	—		39	0
Barcelona	2005–06	La Liga	27	0	3	0	—		10	1	2 (Note: Appearances in Supercopa de España)	0	42	1
Barcelona	2006–07	La Liga	13	0	2	0	—		2	0	4 (Note: Two appearances in FIFA Club World Cup, one appearance in UEFA Super Cup, one appearance in Supercopa de España)	0	21	0
Barcelona	Total		71	0	5	0	—		20	1	6	0	102	1
Chelsea	2007–08	Premier League	23	2	2	0	6	0	7	0	—		38	2
Chelsea	2008–09	Premier League	20	3	4	0	2	0	8	0	—		34	3
Chelsea	2009–10	Premier League	11	0	3	0	3	0	5	0	—		22	0
Chelsea	Total		54	5	9	0	11	0	20	0	—		94	5
Fluminense	2010	Série A	9	0	—		—		—		—		9	0
Career total			193	11	15	1	11	0	61	1	6	0	286	13

=== International ===
Appearances and goals by national team and year
National team	Year	Apps	Goals
Brazil	2001	7	1
Brazil	2002	7	0
Brazil	2003	4	0
Brazil	2004	3	0
Brazil	2005	2	0
Total		23	1

Score and result list Brazil's goal tally first, score column indicates score after Belletti goal.

List of international goals scored by Juliano Belletti
No.	Date	Venue	Opponent	Score	Result	Competition
1	18 July 2001	Estadio Pascual Guerrero, Cali, Colombia	Paraguay	2–1	3–1	2001 Copa América

== Honours ==
=== Player ===
Cruzeiro

- Copa Ouro: 1995

São Paulo

- Campeonato Paulista: 1998, 2000

Villarreal

- UEFA Intertoto Cup: 2003

Barcelona

- La Liga: 2004–05, 2005–06
- Supercopa de España: 2005, 2006
- UEFA Champions League: 2005–06

Chelsea

- Premier League: 2009–10
- FA Cup: 2008–09, 2009–10
- FA Community Shield: 2009
- Football League Cup runner-up: 2007–08
- UEFA Champions League runner-up: 2007–08

Fluminense

- Campeonato Brasileiro Série A: 2010

Brazil

- FIFA World Cup: 2002

=== Manager ===
Barcelona U19

- Copa del Rey Juvenil de Fútbol: 2024–2025
- UEFA Youth League: 2024–25
