= 2012 Catalan regional election =

Election in the Spanish region of Catalonia

- 25 November 2012

All 135 seats in the Parliament of Catalonia 68 seats needed for a majority
- Opinion polls
- Registered: 5,413,868 ▲0.9%
- Turnout: 3,668,310 (67.8%) ▲9.0 pp
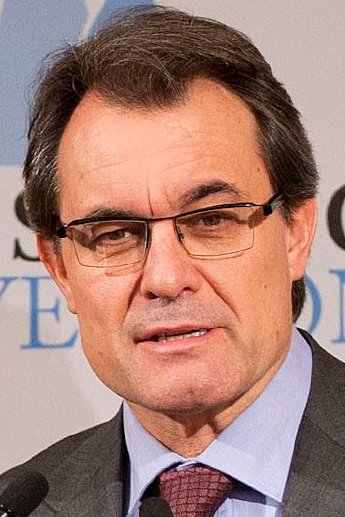

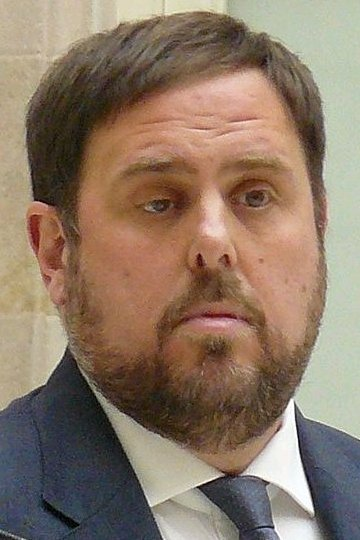

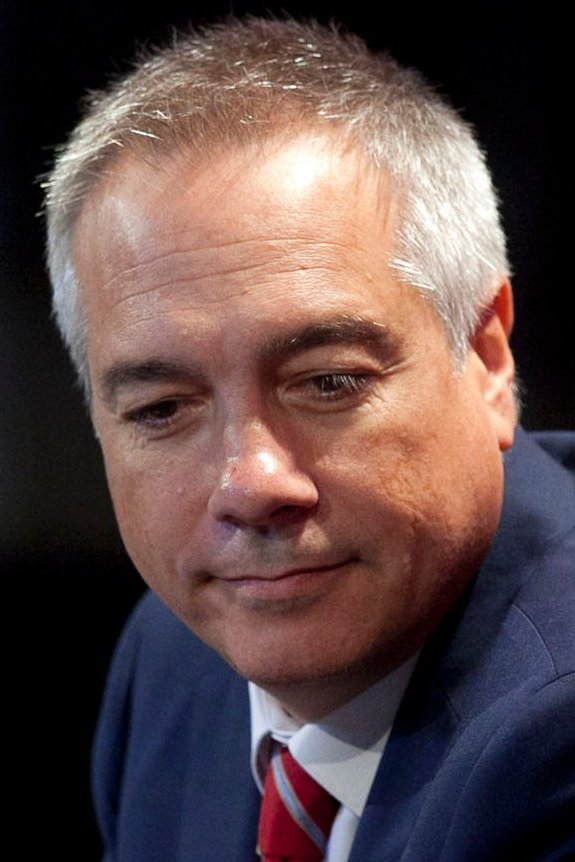

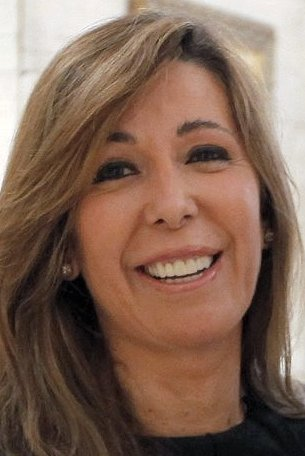

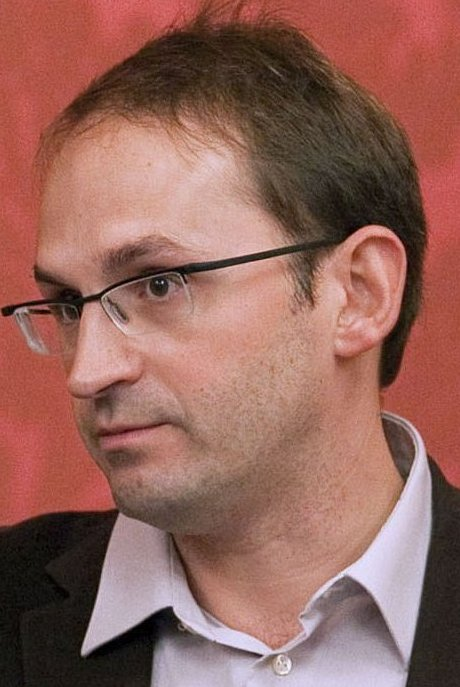

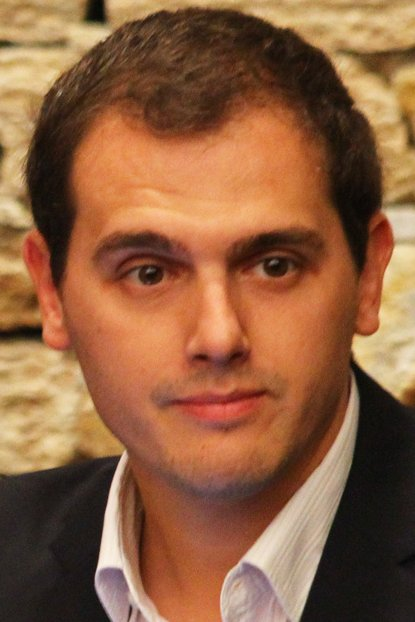

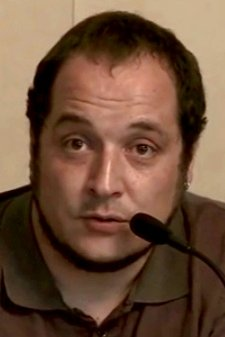
| | First party | Second party | Third party |
|---|---|---|---|
| Leader | Artur Mas | Oriol Junqueras | Pere Navarro |
| Party | CiU | ERC–CatSí | PSC–PSOE |
| Leader since | 7 January 2002 | 17 September 2011 | 17 December 2011 |
| Leader's seat | Barcelona | Barcelona | Barcelona |
| Last election | 62 seats, 38.4% | 10 seats, 7.0% | 28 seats, 18.4% |
| Seats won | 50 | 21 | 20 |
| Seat change | ▼12 | ▲11 | ▼8 |
| Popular vote | 1,116,259 | 498,124 | 524,707 |
| Percentage | 30.7% | 13.7% | 14.4% |
| Swing | ▼7.7 pp | ▲6.7 pp | ▼4.0 pp |
| | Fourth party | Fifth party | Sixth party |
| Leader | Alicia Sánchez-Camacho | Joan Herrera | Albert Rivera |
| Party | PP | ICV–EUiA | C's |
| Leader since | 6 July 2008 | 23 November 2008 | 9 July 2006 |
| Leader's seat | Barcelona | Barcelona | Barcelona |
| Last election | 18 seats, 12.4% | 10 seats, 7.4% | 3 seats, 3.4% |
| Seats won | 19 | 13 | 9 |
| Seat change | ▲1 | ▲3 | ▲6 |
| Popular vote | 471,681 | 359,705 | 274,925 |
| Percentage | 13.0% | 9.9% | 7.6% |
| Swing | ▲0.6 pp | ▲2.5 pp | ▲4.2 pp |
| | Seventh party |
| Leader | David Fernàndez |
| Party | CUP |
| Leader since | 13 October 2012 |
| Leader's seat | Barcelona |
| Last election | Did not contest |
| Seats won | 3 |
| Seat change | ▲3 |
| Popular vote | 126,435 |
| Percentage | 3.5% |
| Swing | New party |
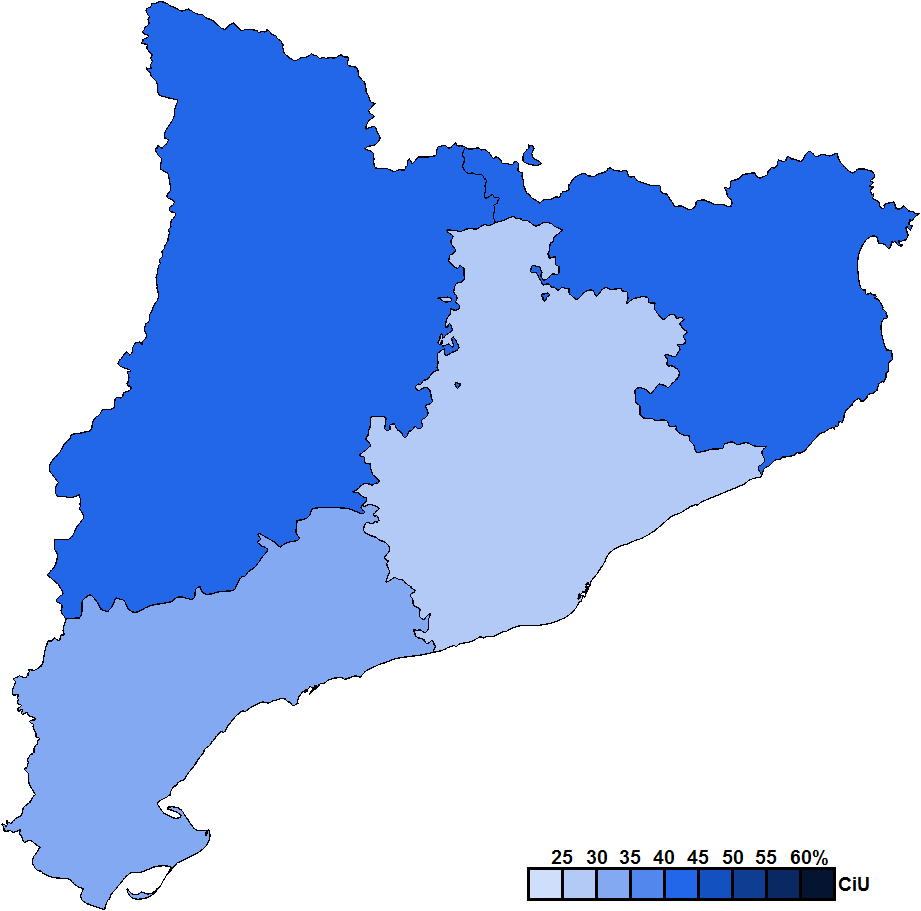
President before election
Artur Mas
CiU
President after election
Artur Mas
CiU

A regional election was held in Catalonia on 25 November 2012 to elect the 10th Parliament of the autonomous community. All 135 seats in the Parliament were up for election. It was a snap election, announced on 25 September by President Artur Mas following the pro-independence demonstration in Barcelona on 11 September—the National Day of Catalonia—and the failed talks between President Mas and Prime Minister Mariano Rajoy to give greater fiscal autonomy to Catalonia.

Despite Artur Mas campaigning to win an absolute majority of seats, Convergence and Union (CiU) suffered an electoral setback which had gone largely unnoticed by opinion polls. The Socialists' Party of Catalonia (PSC) also fared poorly, obtaining fewer seats than pro-independence Republican Left of Catalonia (ERC) and ending up as the third parliamentary force overall. In turn, ERC regained much of the strength it had loss in the 2010 election and became the main parliamentary opposition party for the first time. The People's Party (PP) and Citizens (C's) benefitted from the electoral polarization between the pro-independence and anti-independence blocs, scoring their best results until then, with 19 and 9 seats, respectively. The Popular Unity Candidacy (CUP) also entered the Parliament for the first time.

== Background ==
In the 2010 election, Convergence and Union (CiU) was returned to power after 7 years in opposition, as a result of the electoral collapse of all three parties comprising the "Catalan tripartite" government (Socialists' Party of Catalonia (PSC), Republican Left of Catalonia (ERC) and Initiative for Catalonia Greens (ICV). Newly-elected Catalan president Artur Mas was able to govern comfortably thanks to his party's large parliamentary representation allowing for punctual support of several parties on different issues, in what was known as a policy of "variable geometry". In 2011, CiU signed several agreements with the People's Party (PP) in order to pass the 2011 and 2012 budgets, as well as for the approval of several spending cuts. In spite of this, the relationship between both parties quickly deteriorated after the 2011 general election, as a result of Mas asking new Spanish prime minister Mariano Rajoy for greater fiscal autonomy for Catalonia.

On 11 September 2012, a massive pro-independence demonstration marked the Catalan political agenda and re-opened the debate about the right to hold a referendum on the independence of Catalonia, as well as the debate about the feasibility of an independent Catalan state and its integration into the European Union. On 25 September 2012, President Artur Mas announced a snap regional election to be held on 25 November and argued, referring to the demonstration, that "this election will not be held to help a party to perpetuate itself in power. It will be held so that the whole of the Catalan population decides democratically and peacefully what will their future be as a nation." President Mas signed the decree to officially call the Catalan election on 1 October. Mas' move was criticized as an attempt to try to funnel the popular support for independence seen in the September demonstration into an absolute majority of seats in the election.

== Overview ==
Under the 2006 Statute of Autonomy, the Parliament of Catalonia was the unicameral legislature of the homonymous autonomous community, having legislative power in devolved matters, as well as the ability to grant or withdraw confidence from a regional president. The electoral and procedural rules were supplemented by national law provisions.

=== Date ===
The term of the Parliament of Catalonia expired four years after the date of its previous election, unless it was dissolved earlier. The election was required to be called no later than 15 days before the scheduled expiration date of parliament, with election day taking place between 40 and 60 days from the call. The previous election was held on 28 November 2010, which meant that the chamber's term would have expired on 28 November 2014. The election was required to be called no later than 13 November 2014, setting the latest possible date for election day on 12 January 2015.

The regional president had the prerogative to dissolve the Parliament of Catalonia at any given time and call a snap election, provided that no motion of no confidence was in process and that dissolution did not occur before one year after a previous one under this procedure. In the event of an investiture process failing to elect a regional president within a two-month period from the first ballot, the Parliament was to be automatically dissolved and a fresh election called.

The Parliament of Catalonia was officially dissolved on 2 October 2012 with the publication of the corresponding decree in the Official Journal of the Government of Catalonia (DOGC), setting election day for 25 November.

=== Electoral system ===
Voting for the Parliament was based on universal suffrage, comprising all Spanish nationals over 18 years of age, registered in Catalonia and with full political rights, provided that they had not been deprived of the right to vote by a final sentence, nor were legally incapacitated. Amendments in 2011 introduced a requirement for non-resident citizens to apply for voting, a system known as "begged" voting (Spanish: Voto rogado).

The Parliament of Catalonia had a minimum of 100 and a maximum of 150 seats, with electoral provisions fixing its size at 135. All were elected in four multi-member constituencies—corresponding to the provinces of Barcelona, Girona, Lleida and Tarragona, each of which was assigned a fixed number of seats—using the D'Hondt method and closed-list proportional voting, with a three percent-threshold of valid votes (including blank ballots) in each constituency. The use of this electoral method resulted in a higher effective threshold depending on district magnitude and vote distribution.

As a result of the aforementioned allocation, each Parliament constituency was entitled the following seats:

| Seats | Constituencies |
|---|---|
| 85 | Barcelona |
| 18 | Tarragona |
| 17 | Girona |
| 15 | Lleida |

The law did not provide for by-elections to fill vacant seats; instead, any vacancies arising after the proclamation of candidates and during the legislative term were filled by the next candidates on the party lists or, when required, by designated substitutes.

=== Outgoing parliament ===
The table below shows the composition of the parliamentary groups in the chamber at the time of dissolution.

Parliamentary composition in October 2012
| Groups | Parties | Legislators | |
| Groups | Parties | Seats | Total |
|---|---|---|---|
| Convergence and Union's Parliamentary Group | CDC | 45 | 62 |
| Convergence and Union's Parliamentary Group | UDC | 17 | 62 |
| Socialist Parliamentary Group | PSC | 28 | 28 |
| People's Party of Catalonia's Parliamentary Group | PP | 18 | 18 |
| Initiative for Catalonia Greens–United and Alternative Left's Parliamentary Group | ICV | 8 | 10 |
| Initiative for Catalonia Greens–United and Alternative Left's Parliamentary Group | EUiA | 2 | 10 |
| Republican Left of Catalonia's Parliamentary Group | ERC | 10 | 10 |
| Mixed Group | SI | 3 | 6 |
| Mixed Group | Cs | 3 | 6 |
| Non-Inscrits | DCat | 1 (Note: Joan Laporta, former SI legislator.) | 1 |

== Parties and candidates ==
The electoral law allowed for parties and federations registered in the interior ministry, alliances and groupings of electors to present lists of candidates. Parties and federations intending to form an alliance were required to inform the relevant electoral commission within 10 days of the election call, whereas groupings of electors needed to secure the signature of at least one percent of the electorate in the constituencies for which they sought election, disallowing electors from signing for more than one list. Concurrently, parties, federations or alliances that had not obtained a parliamentary mandate at the preceding election were required to secure the signature of at least 0.1 percent of electors in the aforementioned constituencies. Additionally, a balanced composition of men and women was required in the electoral lists, so that candidates of either sex made up at least 40 percent of the total composition.

Below is a list of the main parties and alliances which contested the election:

| Candidacy | Parties and alliances | Leading candidate | Ideology | Previous result | | Gov. | Ref. |
| Candidacy | Parties and alliances | Leading candidate | Ideology | Vote % | Seats | Gov. | Ref. |
|---|---|---|---|---|---|---|---|
| CiU | List: Convergence and Union (CiU) – Democratic Convergence of Catalonia (CDC) – Democratic Union of Catalonia (UDC) | Artur Mas | Catalan nationalism Centrism | 38.4% | 62 | Yes | |
| PSC–PSOE | List: Socialists' Party of Catalonia (PSC–PSOE) | Pere Navarro | Social democracy | 18.4% | 28 | No | |
| PP | List: People's Party (PP) | Alicia Sánchez-Camacho | Conservatism; Christian democracy | 12.4% | 18 | No | |
| ICV–EUiA | List: Initiative for Catalonia Greens (ICV); United and Alternative Left (EUiA) – Party of the Communists of Catalonia (PCC) – Living Unified Socialist Party of Catalonia (PSUC viu) – Revolutionary Workers' Party (POR) | Joan Herrera | Regionalism; Eco-socialism; Green politics | 7.4% | 10 | No | |
| ERC–CatSí | List: Republican Left of Catalonia (ERC); Catalonia Yes (CatSí) | Oriol Junqueras | Catalan independence Left-wing nationalism Social democracy | 7.0% | 10 | No | |
| SI | List: Catalan Solidarity for Independence (SI) | Alfons López Tena | Catalan independence | 3.3% | 4 | No | |
| C's | List: Citizens–Party of the Citizenry (C's) | Albert Rivera | Social liberalism | 3.4% | 3 | No | |
| CUP | List: Popular Unity Candidacy (CUP) | David Fernàndez | Catalan independence Anti-capitalism; Socialism | Did not contest | | No | |

== Opinion polls ==
The tables below list opinion polling results in reverse chronological order, showing the most recent first and using the dates when the survey fieldwork was done, as opposed to the date of publication. Where the fieldwork dates are unknown, the date of publication is given instead. The highest percentage figure in each polling survey is displayed with its background shaded in the leading party's colour. If a tie ensues, this is applied to the figures with the highest percentages. The "Lead" column on the right shows the percentage-point difference between the parties with the highest percentages in a poll.

=== Graphical summary ===
Local regression trend line of poll results from 28 November 2010 to 25 November 2012, with each line corresponding to a political party.

=== Voting intention estimates ===
The table below lists weighted voting intention estimates. Refusals are generally excluded from the party vote percentages, while question wording and the treatment of "don't know" responses and those not intending to vote may vary between polling organisations. When available, seat projections determined by the polling organisations are displayed below (or in place of) the percentages in a smaller font; 68 seats were required for an absolute majority in the Parliament of Catalonia.

Color key:

Poll conducted after legal ban on opinion polls Exit poll

| Polling firm/Commissioner | Fieldwork date | Sample size | Turnout | CiU | PSC | PP | ICV–EUiA | ERC | C's | SI | PxC | CUP | Lead |
|---|---|---|---|---|---|---|---|---|---|---|---|---|---|
| 2012 regional election | 25 Nov 2012 | —N/a | 67.8 | 30.7; 50 | 14.4; 20 | 13.0; 19 | 9.9; 13 | 13.7; 21 | 7.6; 9 | 1.3; 0 | 1.7; 0 | 3.5; 3 | 16.3 |
| Ipsos–Eco/CCMA | 25 Nov 2012 | 31,242 | ? | 34.0; 54/57 | 12.6; 16/18 | 12.0; 16/18 | 9.0; 10/12 | 14.2; 20/23 | 5.9; 6/7 | – | – | 4.7; 5/6 | 19.8 |
| Sigma Dos/The Guardian | 22 Nov 2012 | ? | ? | ? 57/59 | ? 21/22 | ? 21/22 | – | ? 16 | – | – | – | – | ? |
| Infortécnica | 18 Nov 2012 | 1,450 | ? | ? 60/64 | ? 16/19 | ? 18/21 | ? 11/13 | ? 12/16 | ? 8/11 | ? 0/3 | – | – | ? |
| NC Report/La Razón | 18 Nov 2012 | ? | 59.0 | 38.1; 60/62 | 14.0; 20/21 | 14.3; 19/20 | 8.8; 12 | 10.5; 15 | 5.8; 6/7 | – | – | 2.9; 0/2 | 24.0 |
| crónica.cat | 14–16 Nov 2012 | 1,000 | ? | ? 63/64 | ? 18/19 | ? 16/17 | ? 12 | ? 14/15 | ? 5 | ? 5 | – | – | ? |
| GESOP/El Periódico | 13–16 Nov 2012 | 800 | ? | 38.0; 62/64 | 12.0; 15/17 | 11.6; 15/17 | 9.8; 13/14 | 12.8; 19/20 | 6.0; 6/7 | 2.5; 0/1 | – | 2.8; 0/1 | 25.2 |
| Sigma Dos/El Mundo | 13–16 Nov 2012 | 1,150 | ? | 36.6; 60/63 | 15.3; 21/23 | 13.8; 20/21 | 8.1; 10/12 | 9.5; 14 | 4.5; 5 | 2.8; 0/2 | – | – | 21.3 |
| DYM/ABC | 12–16 Nov 2012 | 847 | ? | 39.6; 60/62 | 13.2; 17 | 14.0; 18 | 8.3; 9/10 | 12.5; 18 | 4.4; 6 | – | – | 4.8; 4/7 | 25.6 |
| Feedback/La Vanguardia | 12–16 Nov 2012 | 1,000 | 58.8 | 38.2; 62/64 | 13.3; 17/19 | 12.1; 16/18 | 11.0; 13/16 | 10.4; 14/15 | 7.2; 7/8 | 1.4; 0 | – | 2.4; 0/2 | 24.9 |
| Metroscopia/El País | 8–15 Nov 2012 | 2,500 | ? | 37.3; 62 | 12.3; 18 | 13.2; 19 | 7.9; 10 | 12.2; 18 | 5.7; 6 | – | – | 3.0; 2 | 24.1 |
| MyWord/Cadena SER | 9–14 Nov 2012 | 1,153 | ? | 36.8; 62/65 | 10.6; 16/17 | 10.9; 16/17 | 9.2; 12/13 | 11.4; 16/17 | 6.5; 8 | 2.9; 0 | – | 2.6; 2 | 25.4 |
| Feedback/La Vanguardia | 6–9 Nov 2012 | 1,000 | 61.3 | 40.0; 64/66 | 12.0; 16/18 | 12.3; 17/18 | 10.2; 12/13 | 10.9; 15/17 | 7.0; 7/8 | 1.7; 0 | – | – | 27.7 |
| Feedback/RAC 1 | 30 Oct–2 Nov 2012 | 900 | 61.0 | 39.7; 64/65 | 13.1; 18 | 12.7; 17/19 | 10.7; 14 | 10.1; 14/15 | 5.4; 6/7 | 2.1; 0 | 1.7; 0 | 1.9; 0 | 26.6 |
| crónica.cat | 29 Oct–2 Nov 2012 | 1,000 | ? | ? 66 | ? 17 | ? 18 | ? 12/13 | ? 14/15 | ? 3 | ? 4/5 | – | – | ? |
| GESOP/Tele 5 | 29 Oct–1 Nov 2012 | 2,000 | ? | 39.0– 40.0; 63/65 | 12.5– 13.5; 18/20 | 11.5– 12.5; 17/18 | 8.5– 9.5; 11/12 | 10.5– 11.5; 17/18 | 5.0– 6.0; 5/7 | – | – | 2.0– 3.0; 0/1 | 26.5 |
| DYM/CEO | 22–30 Oct 2012 | 2,500 | 65.0 | 43.4; 69/71 | 12.0; 15 | 12.5; 18/19 | 8.0; 10 | 9.5; 14 | 5.1; 6 | 2.0; 0 | – | 2.8; 0/3 | 30.9 |
| CIS | 9–29 Oct 2012 | 2,983 | ? | 36.8; 63/64 | 12.9; 19 | 11.0; 16/17 | 8.1; 11 | 11.1; 17 | 6.0; 7 | 2.1; 1 | 0.5; 0 | 1.6; 0 | 23.9 |
| GAPS/Ara | 25–26 Oct 2012 | 809 | ? | 39.0; 64/66 | 13.3; 19/21 | 12.9; 19/20 | 8.0; 9/12 | 11.2; 16/18 | 5.0; 5/6 | 1.8; 0 | – | 1.5; 0 | 25.7 |
| Feedback/La Vanguardia | 22–26 Oct 2012 | 1,000 | ? | 40.9; 65/66 | 13.4; 18 | 11.4; 17 | 10.1; 12/13 | 10.6; 16 | 5.6; 6 | 1.8; 0 | – | – | 27.5 |
| GESOP/El Periódico | 18–22 Oct 2012 | 800 | ? | 39.1; 64/65 | 14.0; 20/21 | 11.5; 15/16 | 9.4; 13/14 | 10.2; 15/16 | 5.0; 5/6 | 2.5; 0 | – | 2.4; 0 | 25.1 |
| Feedback/RAC 1 | 15–19 Oct 2012 | 900 | 60.0 | 40.7; 67 | 15.0; 21 | 12.2; 17 | 9.6; 12 | 9.7; 14 | 4.2; 4 | 2.2; 0 | 1.9; 0 | 1.1; 0 | 25.7 |
| Feedback/La Vanguardia | 8–11 Oct 2012 | 1,000 | ? | 43.2; 68/69 | 15.2; 20/21 | 12.0; 17/18 | 8.6; 10/11 | 9.3; 13 | 3.1; 3 | 2.6; 0/2 | ? 0/2 | – | 28.0 |
| NC Report/La Razón | 29 Sep 2012 | 850 | 59.8 | 36.7; 58/59 | 17.1; 24/25 | 13.7; 20 | 9.1; 12 | 9.3; 14 | 3.6; 3 | – | 3.3; 3 | – | 19.6 |
| Sigma Dos/El Mundo | 26–28 Sep 2012 | 1,225 | ? | 39.2; 64/65 | 16.9; 24/25 | 12.8; 18/20 | 8.5; 11 | 8.2; 12 | 3.3; 3 | 3.0; 0/2 | – | – | 22.3 |
| GESOP/El Periódico | 26–27 Sep 2012 | 800 | ? | 41.0; 64/65 | 14.5; 20/21 | 9.9; 12/13 | 7.7; 10 | 11.3; 17/18 | 5.0; 5 | 4.5; 5/6 | – | – | 28.0 |
| Feedback/La Vanguardia | 21–27 Sep 2012 | 1,200 | ? | 43.0; 66/67 | 15.7; 21 | 11.8; 15/16 | 9.6; 12 | 10.1; 13 | 3.6; 4 | 3.3; 3 | – | – | 27.3 |
| GESOP/Tele 5 | 15 Sep 2012 | 2,000 | ? | ? 58/60 | ? 23/25 | ? 15/16 | ? 12/13 | ? 17/19 | ? 3/4 | ? 4/5 | – | – | ? |
| NC Report/La Razón | 12–15 Sep 2012 | 750 | 60.1 | 38.0; 58/62 | 15.8; 22/25 | 13.5; 20 | 8.9; 11 | 9.8; 15 | 3.8; 4 | – | 3.4; 3 | – | 22.2 |
| Tàstic/Ara | 23 Jul 2012 | ? | ? | 34.5; 55/57 | 16.6; 26/28 | 11.2; 16/17 | 9.7; 11/13 | 9.9; 15/16 | 3.4; 0/3 | 3.7; 0/4 | – | – | 17.9 |
| DYM/CEO | 4–18 Jun 2012 | 2,500 | 57.4 | 36.2; 60 | 16.4; 24/25 | 10.5; 15/16 | 9.5; 12/13 | 9.7; 15/16 | 3.7; 3/4 | 3.5; 0/4 | – | – | 19.8 |
| CDC | 14 Jun 2012 | ? | 55 | ? 52/54 | ? 28/30 | ? 15 | ? 13/14 | ? 17 | ? 0/3 | ? 0/3 | – | – | ? |
| Feedback/La Vanguardia | 30 May–7 Jun 2012 | 1,200 | ? | 37.9; 58/60 | 17.7; 26/28 | 11.8; 16 | 9.9; 13 | 9.3; 15 | 3.2; 3 | 3.3; 1/3 | – | – | 20.2 |
| GESOP/El Periódico | 7–9 May 2012 | 800 | ? | 33.9; 56/57 | 18.4; 28/29 | 10.2; 13/14 | 9.7; 13 | 10.6; 17/18 | 4.5; 5 | 2.4; 0 | – | – | 15.5 |
| DYM/CEO | 6–21 Feb 2012 | 2,500 | ? | 37.0; 62/63 | 16.5; 25/26 | 11.7; 18/19 | 8.1; 10/11 | 9.6; 14/15 | 4.0; 3/4 | 2.4; 0 | – | – | 20.5 |
| GESOP/El Periódico | 16–19 Jan 2012 | 800 | ? | 35.2; 62/63 | 16.9; 27/28 | 10.5; 14/15 | 8.6; 12/13 | 9.0; 13/14 | 3.8; 4 | 2.3; 0 | – | – | 18.3 |
| Feedback/La Vanguardia | 22–28 Dec 2011 | 1,200 | ? | 38.5; 61/62 | 16.9; 25 | 12.2; 19 | 10.0; 13/14 | 9.8; 15 | 2.1; 0/2 | 1.5; 0 | – | – | 21.6 |
| 2011 general election | 20 Nov 2011 | —N/a | 65.2 | 29.3 (46) | 26.7 (38) | 20.7 (31) | 8.1 (10) | 7.1 (10) | – | – | 1.7 (0) | – | 2.6 |
| GESOP/El Periódico | 19–21 Jun 2011 | 800 | ? | 36.7; 62/63 | 17.5; 27/28 | 13.0; 19/20 | 8.3; 11/12 | 6.5; 8/9 | 3.0; 3 | 2.9; 0/2 | 2.4; 0 | 2.5; 0/2 | 19.2 |
| GESOP/CEO | 2–17 Jun 2011 | 2,500 | 60.6 | 41.4; 68/69 | 19.0; 29 | 10.2; 14/15 | 8.9; 13 | 5.8; 8 | 2.3; 2 | 2.3; 0 | 1.5; 0 | 1.2; 0 | 22.4 |
| GESOP/CEO | 17–27 Jan 2011 | 2,500 | 60.4 | 44.4; 71 | 16.8; 24/25 | 9.6; 14/15 | 8.0; 11 | 6.9; 11 | 2.6; 2 | 2.3; 1 | – | – | 27.6 |
| 2010 regional election | 28 Nov 2010 | —N/a | 58.8 | 38.4; 62 | 18.4; 28 | 12.4; 18 | 7.4; 10 | 7.0; 10 | 3.4; 3 | 3.3; 4 | 2.4; 0 | – | 20.0 |

=== Voting preferences ===
The table below lists raw, unweighted voting preferences.

| Polling firm/Commissioner | Fieldwork date | Sample size | CiU | PSC | PP | ICV–EUiA | ERC | C's | SI | PxC | CUP | Question | X mark | Lead |
|---|---|---|---|---|---|---|---|---|---|---|---|---|---|---|
| 2012 regional election (Note: Does not include non-resident citizens.) | 25 Nov 2012 | —N/a | 21.2 | 10.0 | 9.0 | 6.8 | 9.4 | 5.2 | 0.9 | 1.1 | 2.4 | —N/a | 30.4 | 11.2 |
| Infortécnica | 18 Nov 2012 | 1,450 | 24.2 | 9.0 | 5.4 | 5.8 | 8.2 | 3.4 | 1.0 | – | – | 28.5 | 13.4 | 15.2 |
| GESOP/El Periódico | 13–16 Nov 2012 | 800 | 29.5 | 8.0 | 6.3 | 6.4 | 12.6 | 4.4 | 1.4 | 0.1 | 1.5 | 20.4 | 4.4 | 16.9 |
| MyWord/Cadena SER | 9–14 Nov 2012 | 1,153 | 21.3 | 4.7 | 4.1 | 8.8 | 11.6 | 5.2 | 2.3 | – | 2.2 | 27.6 | 5.1 | 9.7 |
| Feedback/RAC 1 | 30 Oct–2 Nov 2012 | 900 | 29.5 | 8.4 | 5.2 | 9.5 | 11.2 | 4.7 | 1.9 | 0.5 | 2.2 | 10.6 | 8.3 | 18.3 |
| DYM/CEO | 22–30 Oct 2012 | 2,500 | 28.3 | 5.0 | 1.8 | 5.0 | 8.9 | 1.2 | 1.0 | – | – | 40.3 | 4.2 | 19.4 |
| CIS | 9–29 Oct 2012 | 2,983 | 27.0 | 10.0 | 5.7 | 6.4 | 9.0 | 3.5 | 1.2 | 0.3 | 0.9 | 18.5 | 10.9 | 17.0 |
| GESOP/El Periódico | 18–22 Oct 2012 | 800 | 32.0 | 7.9 | 7.1 | 7.4 | 9.6 | 3.9 | 1.5 | – | 1.4 | 16.9 | 6.1 | 22.4 |
| Feedback/RAC 1 | 15–19 Oct 2012 | 900 | 32.7 | 8.9 | 4.6 | 8.4 | 10.3 | 3.2 | 1.9 | 0.3 | 1.1 | 13.8 | 7.6 | 22.4 |
| GESOP/El Periódico | 26–27 Sep 2012 | 800 | 28.9 | 6.5 | 3.8 | 3.9 | 8.8 | 2.3 | 1.8 | 0.1 | – | 32.0 | 6.1 | 20.1 |
| DYM/CEO | 4–18 Jun 2012 | 2,500 | 25.7 | 10.1 | 2.2 | 9.0 | 7.7 | 0.7 | 1.4 | – | – | 22.9 | 11.6 | 15.6 |
| GESOP/El Periódico | 7–9 May 2012 | 800 | 24.3 | 13.8 | 3.8 | 6.8 | 10.4 | 1.9 | 0.5 | 0.1 | – | 19.1 | 9.4 | 10.5 |
| DYM/CEO | 6–21 Feb 2012 | 2,500 | 30.4 | 11.0 | 3.3 | 8.1 | 8.0 | 1.1 | 1.1 | – | – | 20.6 | 8.8 | 19.4 |
| GESOP/El Periódico | 16–19 Jan 2012 | 800 | 27.0 | 11.6 | 4.9 | 6.4 | 8.8 | 1.6 | 0.9 | – | – | 16.3 | 10.6 | 15.4 |
| 2011 general election | 20 Nov 2011 | —N/a | 19.3 | 17.5 | 13.6 | 5.3 | 4.7 | – | – | 1.1 | – | —N/a | 33.2 | 1.8 |
| GESOP/ICPS | 19 Sep–27 Oct 2011 | 2,000 | 29.8 | 13.4 | 5.9 | 5.0 | 8.6 | 1.3 | 1.4 | 0.4 | 0.4 | 14.3 | 13.6 | 16.4 |
| GESOP/El Periódico | 19–21 Jun 2011 | 800 | 28.0 | 11.3 | 5.8 | 6.5 | 5.1 | 1.4 | 2.0 | 0.5 | 1.4 | 15.8 | 8.8 | 16.7 |
| GESOP/CEO | 2–17 Jun 2011 | 2,500 | 32.1 | 12.9 | 4.6 | 7.5 | 4.4 | 1.4 | 1.7 | – | – | 15.4 | 8.4 | 19.2 |
| GESOP/CEO | 17–27 Jan 2011 | 2,500 | 34.5 | 11.5 | 4.1 | 7.2 | 5.7 | 1.4 | 1.8 | – | – | 16.3 | 7.7 | 23.0 |
| 2010 regional election | 28 Nov 2010 | —N/a | 22.9 | 10.9 | 7.3 | 4.4 | 4.2 | 2.0 | 2.0 | 1.4 | – | —N/a | 40.1 | 12.0 |

=== Victory preferences ===
The table below lists opinion polling on the victory preferences for each party in the event of a regional election taking place.

| Polling firm/Commissioner | Fieldwork date | Sample size | CiU | PSC | PP | ICV–EUiA | ERC | C's | SI | PxC | Other/ None | Question | Lead |
|---|---|---|---|---|---|---|---|---|---|---|---|---|---|
| CIS | 9–29 Oct 2012 | 2,983 | 30.8 | 13.4 | 7.0 | 7.9 | 10.4 | 3.6 | 1.2 | 0.4 | 3.2 | 22.1 | 17.4 |

=== Victory likelihood ===
The table below lists opinion polling on the perceived likelihood of victory for each party in the event of a regional election taking place.

| Polling firm/Commissioner | Fieldwork date | Sample size | CiU | PSC | PP | ICV–EUiA | ERC | C's | SI | Other/ None | Question | Lead |
|---|---|---|---|---|---|---|---|---|---|---|---|---|
| Metroscopia/El País | 8–15 Nov 2012 | 2,500 | 75.0 | 2.0 | 2.0 | – | 0.0 | 0.0 | – | 0.0 | 21.0 | 73.0 |
| DYM/CEO | 22–30 Oct 2012 | 2,500 | 78.3 | 1.3 | 1.1 | 0.0 | 0.6 | 0.0 | 0.0 | 0.2 | 18.5 | 77.0 |
| CIS | 9–29 Oct 2012 | 2,983 | 77.3 | 3.6 | 2.7 | 0.1 | 1.4 | 0.1 | 0.1 | 0.1 | 14.6 | 73.7 |

=== Preferred President ===
The table below lists opinion polling on leader preferences to become president of the Government of Catalonia.

| Polling firm/Commissioner | Fieldwork date | Sample size | | | | | | | | Other/ None/ Not care | Question | Lead |
| Polling firm/Commissioner | Fieldwork date | Sample size | Mas CiU | Navarro PSC | Camacho PP | Herrera ICV–EUiA | Junqueras ERC | Rivera C's | De Tena SI | Other/ None/ Not care | Question | Lead |
|---|---|---|---|---|---|---|---|---|---|---|---|---|
| GESOP/El Periódico | 13–16 Nov 2012 | 800 | 38.9 | 5.5 | 6.6 | 7.4 | 11.1 | 5.8 | 2.1 | 12.4 | 10.2 | 27.8 |
| CIS | 9–29 Oct 2012 | 2,983 | 37.2 | 6.6 | 6.1 | 7.1 | 6.4 | 2.9 | 0.8 | 9.3 | 23.6 | 30.1 |
| GESOP/El Periódico | 18–22 Oct 2012 | 800 | 41.4 | 6.4 | 6.1 | 7.9 | 7.3 | 4.8 | 1.6 | 16.6 | 8.1 | 33.5 |

== Voter turnout ==
The table below shows registered voter turnout during the election. Figures for election day do not include non-resident citizens, while final figures do.

| Province | Time (Election day) | | | | | | | | | Final | | |
| Province | 13:00 | | | 18:00 | | | 20:00 | | | Final | | |
| Province | 2010 | 2012 | +/– | 2010 | 2012 | +/– | 2010 | 2012 | +/– | 2010 | 2012 | +/– |
|---|---|---|---|---|---|---|---|---|---|---|---|---|
| Barcelona | 24.74% | 29.41% | +4.67 | 48.47% | 56.58% | +8.11 | 60.05% | 69.89% | +9.84 | 58.88% | 68.00% | +9.12 |
| Girona | 26.62% | 32.71% | +6.09 | 50.38% | 59.44% | +9.06 | 60.49% | 70.77% | +10.28 | 59.49% | 69.29% | +9.80 |
| Lleida | 23.40% | 26.45% | +3.05 | 48.30% | 53.45% | +5.15 | 61.78% | 69.29% | +7.51 | 59.87% | 66.78% | +6.91 |
| Tarragona | 24.24% | 28.24% | +4.00 | 46.07% | 52.96% | +6.89 | 57.68% | 66.39% | +8.71 | 56.79% | 65.17% | +8.38 |
| Total | 24.79% | 29.43% | +4.64 | 48.39% | 56.30% | +7.91 | 59.95% | 69.57% | +9.62 | 58.78% | 67.76% | +8.98 |

== Results ==
=== Overall ===
← Summary of the 25 November 2012 Parliament of Catalonia election results →
| Parties and alliances | Popular vote | | | Seats | |
| Parties and alliances | Votes | % | ±pp | Total | +/− |
|---|---|---|---|---|---|
| Convergence and Union (CiU) | 1,116,259 | 30.71 | −7.72 | 50 | −12 |
| Socialists' Party of Catalonia (PSC–PSOE) | 524,707 | 14.43 | −3.95 | 20 | −8 |
| Republican Left of Catalonia–Catalonia Yes (ERC–CatSí) | 498,124 | 13.70 | +6.70 | 21 | +11 |
| People's Party (PP) | 471,681 | 12.98 | +0.61 | 19 | +1 |
| Initiative for Catalonia Greens–United and Alternative Left (ICV–EUiA) | 359,705 | 9.90 | +2.53 | 13 | +3 |
| Citizens–Party of the Citizenry (C's) | 275,007 | 7.57 | +4.18 | 9 | +6 |
| Popular Unity Candidacy–Left Alternative (CUP) | 126,435 | 3.48 | New | 3 | +3 |
| Platform for Catalonia (PxC) | 60,107 | 1.65 | −0.75 | 0 | ±0 |
| Catalan Solidarity for Independence (SI) | 46,838 | 1.29 | −2.00 | 0 | −4 |
| Blank Seats (EB) | 28,288 | 0.78 | +0.18 | 0 | ±0 |
| Animalist Party Against Mistreatment of Animals (PACMA) | 20,861 | 0.57 | +0.12 | 0 | ±0 |
| Pirates of Catalonia (Pirata.cat) | 18,219 | 0.50 | +0.29 | 0 | ±0 |
| Union, Progress and Democracy (UPyD) | 14,614 | 0.40 | +0.23 | 0 | ±0 |
| Hartos.org (Hartos.org) | 11,702 | 0.32 | New | 0 | ±0 |
| Democratic Way (VD) | 5,984 | 0.16 | New | 0 | ±0 |
| Communist Unification of Spain (UCE) | 2,582 | 0.07 | +0.04 | 0 | ±0 |
| Republican Left (IR) | 826 | 0.02 | −0.03 | 0 | ±0 |
| Socialists and Republicans (SyR) | 333 | 0.01 | New | 0 | ±0 |
| Blank ballots | 52,898 | 1.46 | −1.47 | | |
| Total | 3,635,170 | | | 135 | ±0 |
| Valid votes | 3,635,170 | 99.10 | −0.19 | | |
| Invalid votes | 33,140 | 0.90 | +0.19 | | |
| Votes cast / turnout | 3,668,310 | 67.76 | +8.98 | | |
| Abstentions | 1,745,558 | 32.24 | −8.98 | | |
| Registered voters | 5,413,868 | | | | |

Popular vote
| CiU | 30.71% |
| PSC–PSOE | 14.43% |
| ERC–CatSí | 13.70% |
| PP | 12.98% |
| ICV–EUiA | 9.90% |
| C's | 7.57% |
| CUP | 3.48% |
| PxC | 1.65% |
| SI | 1.29% |
| Others | 2.84% |
| Blank ballots | 1.46% |

Seats
| CiU | 37.04% |
| ERC–CatSí | 15.56% |
| PSC–PSOE | 14.81% |
| PP | 14.07% |
| ICV–EUiA | 9.63% |
| C's | 6.67% |
| CUP | 2.22% |

=== Distribution by constituency ===
| Constituency | CiU | | PSC | | ERC | | PP | | ICV–EUiA | | C's | | CUP | |
| Constituency | % | S | % | S | % | S | % | S | % | S | % | S | % | S |
|---|---|---|---|---|---|---|---|---|---|---|---|---|---|---|
| Barcelona | 28.1 | 26 | 15.4 | 14 | 12.7 | 12 | 13.3 | 12 | 11.1 | 10 | 8.4 | 8 | 3.4 | 3 |
| Girona | 43.0 | 9 | 10.1 | 2 | 17.8 | 3 | 9.6 | 2 | 5.9 | 1 | 3.6 | − | 4.2 | − |
| Lleida | 43.1 | 8 | 10.4 | 1 | 17.4 | 3 | 11.3 | 2 | 5.4 | 1 | 3.3 | − | 3.0 | − |
| Tarragona | 31.7 | 7 | 13.6 | 3 | 15.1 | 3 | 15.0 | 3 | 6.9 | 1 | 7.3 | 1 | 3.6 | − |
| Total | 30.7 | 50 | 14.4 | 20 | 13.7 | 21 | 13.0 | 19 | 9.9 | 13 | 7.6 | 9 | 3.5 | 3 |

== Aftermath ==
=== Government formation ===
Investiture; Nomination of Artur Mas (CiU)
| Ballot → | 21 December 2012 |
| Required majority → | 68 out of 135 |
| Yes: • CiU (50); • ERC (21) | 71 / 135 |
| No: • PSC (20); • PP (18); • ICV–EUiA (13); • C's (9); • CUP (3) | 63 / 135 |
| Abstentions | 0 / 135 |
| Absentees: • PP (1) | 1 / 135 |

== Bibliography ==
- Ley Orgánica 4/1979, de 18 de diciembre, de Estatuto de Autonomía de Cataluña (Organic Law 4/1979). Official State Gazette (in Spanish). 18 December 1979. BOE-A-1979-30178.
- Ley Orgánica 5/1985, de 19 de junio, del Régimen Electoral General (Organic Law 5/1985). Official State Gazette (in Spanish). 19 June 1985 [version as of 22 September 2012]. BOE-A-1985-11672.
- Ley Orgánica 6/2006, de 19 de julio, de reforma del Estatuto de Autonomía de Cataluña (Organic Law 6/2006). Official State Gazette (in Spanish). 19 July 2006 [version as of 19 January 2011]. BOE-A-2006-13087.
- Ley 13/2008, de 5 de noviembre, de la presidencia de la Generalidad y del Gobierno (Law 13/2008). Official State Gazette (in Spanish). 5 November 2008 [version as of 6 September 2010]. BOE-A-2008-19526.
- Decreto 104/2012, de 1 de octubre, de convocatoria de elecciones al Parlamento de Cataluña y de su disolución (PDF) (Decree 104/2012). Official Journal of the Government of Catalonia (in Spanish). 1 October 2012. DOGC-B-12271010-2012.
