= Popular Unity Candidacy =

Radical left, municipalist and pro-Catalan independence political organisation

Popular Unity Candidacy Candidatura d'Unitat Popular
- Abbreviation: CUP
- Secretary-General: Ramon Casadevall
- Coordinator: Berta Ramis
- Founded: 1991
- Headquarters: Carrer Casp 180; Barcelona
- Newspaper: InfoCUP
- Membership: 1,912
- Ideology: Catalan independence; Socialism; Communism; Direct democracy; Anti-capitalism; Pancatalanism; Euroscepticism
- Political position: Left-wing to far-left
- Trade union affiliation: Coordinadora Obrera Sindical (COS)
- Colors: Yellow; Red; Black; White
- Slogan: Governem-nos
- Congress of Deputies (Catalan seats): 0 / 48
- Parliament of Catalonia: 4 / 135
- Mayors in Catalonia: 19 / 947
- Local Government in Catalonia: 335 / 9,077
- Local Government in the Valencian Community: 2 / 5,716

Party flag

Website
- cup.cat

The Popular Unity Candidacy (Catalan: Candidatura d'Unitat Popular, CUP) is a left-wing to far-left pro-Catalan independence political party active primarily in Catalonia, where it has political representation, but also in other autonomous communities in Spain that it considers to be part of the Catalan Countries. The CUP traditionally has focused on municipal politics, and is made up of a series of autonomous candidatures that run in local elections. Its presence is strongest within the borders of Catalonia.

In 2012, the CUP decided for the first time to run for Catalan parliamentary elections, gaining three MPs out of 135. In the 2015 elections, they obtained 10 MPs.

== Organisation ==
The CUP is made up of autonomous local assemblies representing towns or neighborhoods. These assemblies may have some ideological differences, but their common ground is independence for the Catalan Countries and clear left-wing politics, often in the form of anti-capitalism, socialism, and eco-socialism.

The different local candidatures are coordinated through the Municipal Assembly of the Independentist Left (AMEI in Catalan) where the details regarding their party platform are discussed.

The highly decentralised nature of this party stems from a belief in municipalism. The CUP consider municipal government "the only institutions within the reach of the general populace".

=== Current members ===
Party	Notes
Forward–Socialist Organization of National Liberation (Endavant–OSAN)	
Free People (PL–PPCC)	From November 2014.
Internationalist Struggle (LI–CI)	Joined in January 2015.

=== Former members ===
Party	Notes
The Greens–Green Alternative (EV–AV)	Joined in January 2015, left in November 2017 to join Together for Catalonia.
In Struggle (EL)	Merged into the CUP in November 2016.
Red Current (CR)	Left in February 2016.
Movement for Defence of the Land (MDT)	Merged into Free People in 2014.

== Ideology ==
The CUP website describes the entity as "an assembly-based political organisation spread throughout the Catalan Countries that works for a country that's independent, socialist, environmentally sustainable and free from the domination of the patriarchy".

The party defends the unity of the Catalan-speaking areas, or Catalan Countries, which they believe should be allowed to constitute an independent republic, according to the principles of self-determination. The CUP is also strongly in favor of the Catalan language, which should be the "preferential and common language" of the areas where it is traditionally spoken. Still, the 2012 CUP program refers to the advantages of multilingualism and encourages debate on the status that an independent Catalonia would grant to French and Spanish.

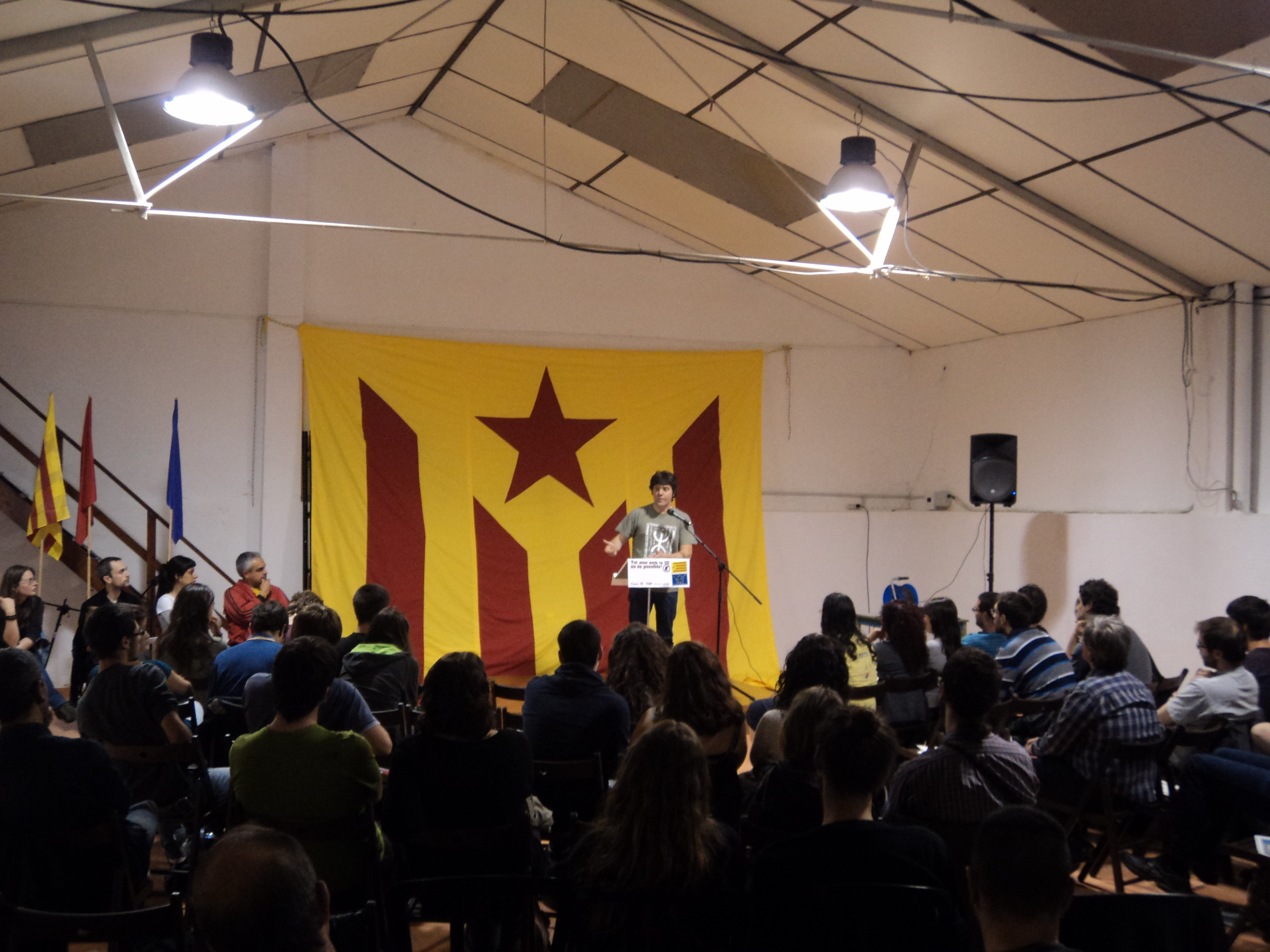
A CUP political event in 2014

The CUP criticises the current political system in place in Spain and France, and defend an alternative brand of participative democracy. It has proposed, for example, that the general public be allowed to vote on important issues in referendums, and have suggested the creation of representative recall (Catalan: Iniciativa Popular Revocatòria), which would allow the general public to remove elected officials from office before their term expires. As part of its belief in municipalism, it also has defended the creation of an Assembly of Councillors (Catalan: Assemblea de Regidors i Regidores Electes), made up of municipal councillors, as a national representative body.

The party broadly refers to its economic model as socialist. Its political programme calls for a "planned economy based on solidarity, aimed towards fulfilling the needs of the people", and defends the nationalisation of public utilities as well as transport and communication networks. It also calls for a nationalisation of all banks receiving government bailouts and considers the public debt "illegitimate". It also calls for an end to nuclear energy, with the use of sustainable energy in its stead. It also calls for a ban on GMOs and the creation of an "ecological economy". The CUP believes in full civic rights for all inhabitants of the Catalan Countries, including migrants. It also calls for voting rights for everyone over 16 years of age as well as an end to discrimination against women and LGBT people.

In an interview with Jacobin magazine, Boaz Vilallonga described the ideology of the CUP as having a "libertarian socialist and even anarcho-syndicalist character".

The party observes a pay cap, limiting monthly wages for its elected officials to between €1,671 and €1,894 depending on family situation.

== Representation ==
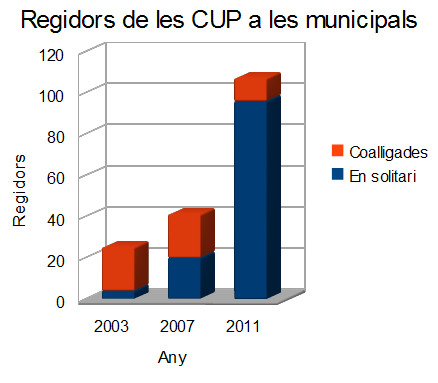
Chart showing the number of council seats won by the CUP running alone (blue) and in coalition (red)

Since 2003, the presence of the CUP in Catalan municipal politics has increased steadily.

=== 2003–11 municipal elections ===
In 2003, the CUP ran alone in 10 municipalities in Catalonia, winning four council seats in three towns. In 8 more municipalities, the CUP ran as part of local coalitions.

From 2007–2011, the CUP held a total of 26 council seats in 17 different municipalities in Catalonia; these were obtained either under the CUP name alone or in coalition with local political parties. In the 2007 municipal elections, the CUP obtained 18,000 votes, or about 0.65% of the votes cast.

In the 2011 municipal elections, the CUP ran in 80 of Catalonia's 947 municipalities, winning about 62,000 votes (2.16% of those cast), and coming in as the sixth largest party in terms of vote share. As a result, the CUP won a total of 104 municipal council seats; four towns had CUP mayors. Also, it held 11 seats on different comarca councils.

=== 2012 Catalan regional election ===
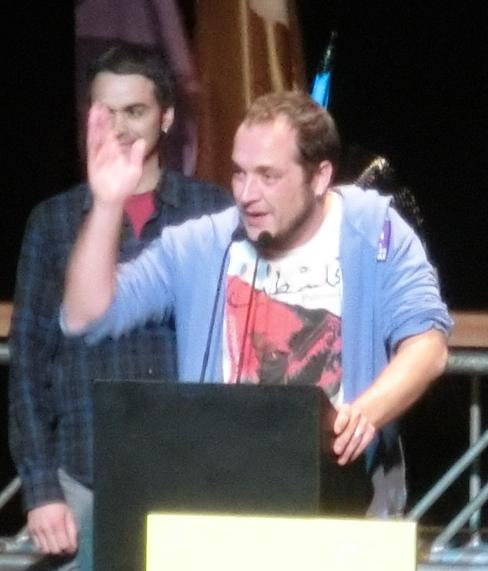
David Fernández was a member of the Catalan Parliament for the CUP in the 2012–2015 legislature

In 2012, after snap elections were declared by Catalan president Artur Mas, different local branches of the CUP organised assemblies open to the general public in order to debate whether the CUP should run. On 13 October, the general assembly of the CUP met in Molins de Rei and decided, with 77% in favour, to run for the first time in the 2012 Catalan regional election. For this purpose, the CUP decided use the name Candidatura d'Unitat Popular – Alternativa d'Esquerres (Popular Unity Candidacy – Left-Wing Alternative) in order to include independent candidates who chose to run on CUP lists. David Fernàndez, a journalist from Gràcia, was chosen to head the list for Barcelona.

The CUP promised that, if elected, its candidates only would serve one term, earn no more than €1,600 a month, and base their decisions on the opinions expressed by local assemblies. it also promised not to request any loans from banks, so as to avoid being influenced by "financial groups and economic élites".

The CUP was able to win representation in the Catalan Parliament with three seats, and 126,219 votes. The three CUP seats went to the party's spokesman David Fernàndez, Georgina Rieradevall (number two on the list later on replaced by Isabel Vallet), and Quim Arrufat (number three on the list). These results are historic for the CUP, but its spokesman emphasises that it must keep on working and fighting in the streets for a better future.

=== 2015 municipal elections ===
In the 2015 municipal elections, the CUP presented candidatures in 163 different municipalities, more than double the number of candidatures presented in the previous elections. In Catalonia, the CUP obtained 221,746 votes in all (7.12% percent of those cast). This was more than three times what it had won in 2011, earning 372 council seats, an absolute majority on nine town councils, and a relative majority in four more. CUP mayors were chosen in 14 municipalities, whereas previously the CUP only held three mayorships. For the first time, the CUP won the government of the capital of a comarca, Berga.

Coalitions including the CUP won important victories in other municipalities; in Badalona, Catalonia's third most populous city, a coalition including the CUP came in second and won the mayorship with the help of other left-wing parties. The CUP managed to win representation in most major cities in Catalonia, including Barcelona, Girona, Lleida, Tarragona, L'Hospitalet and Terrassa. In the Valencian Community, the CUP ran in four municipalities, and won seats on the municipal councils of two, Pedreguer and Burjassot.

=== 2015–17 Catalan regional elections ===
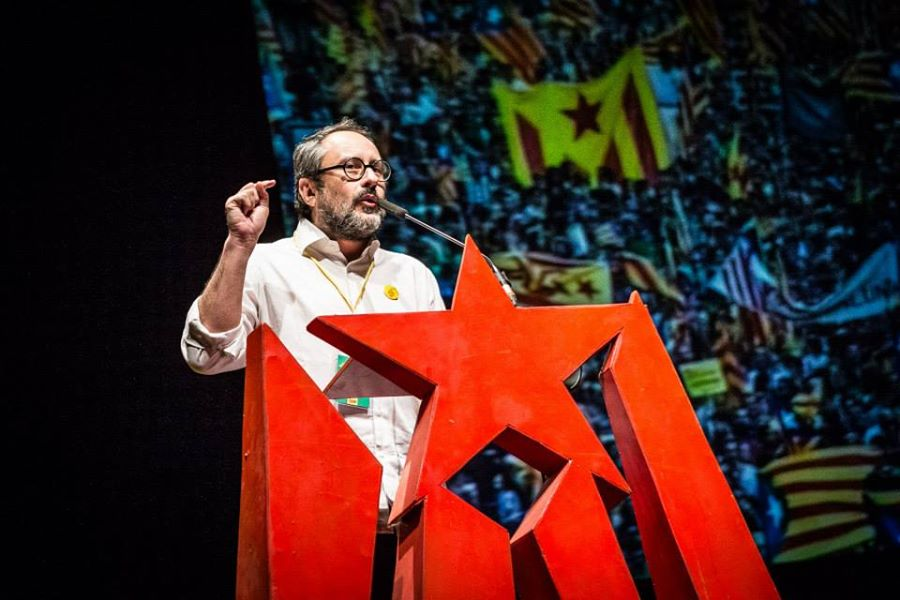
Candidate Antonio Baños at a campaign meeting

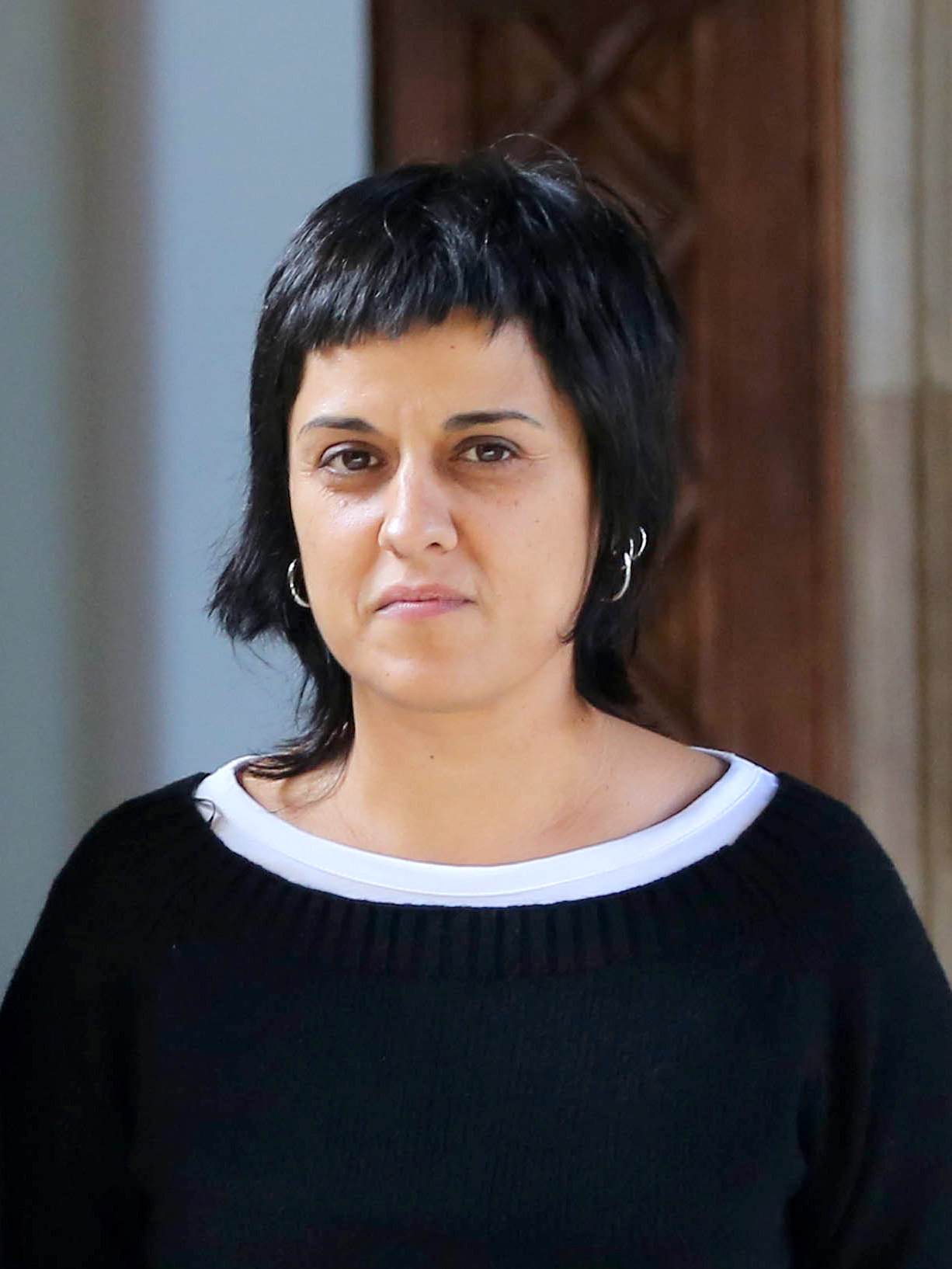
Anna Gabriel, spokeswoman for the CUP in the Parliament of Catalonia 2016–2017

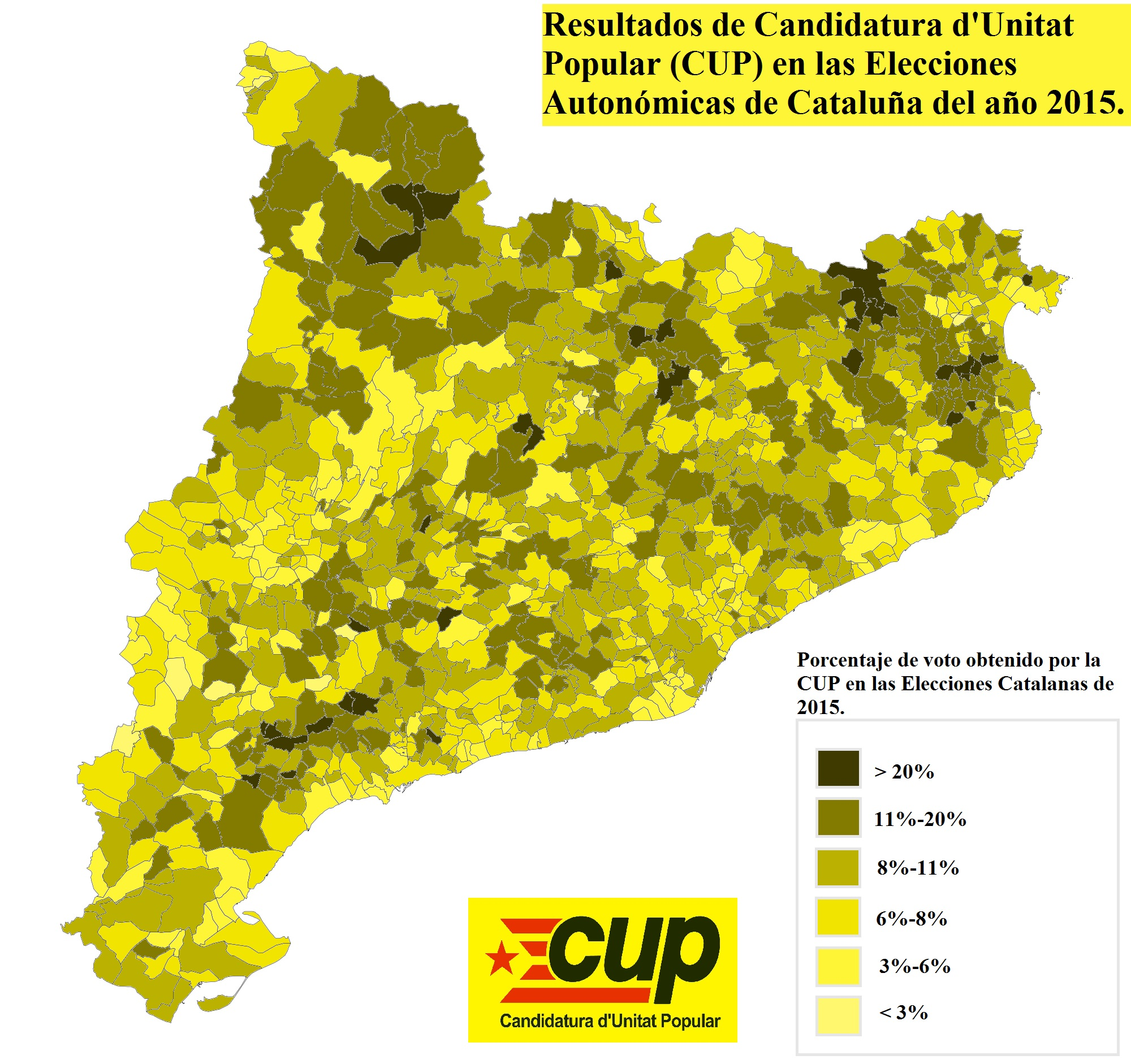
CUP results by municipality in the 2015 election.

In the 2015 Catalan regional election, the CUP formed a platform called Popular Unity Candidacy–Constituent Call (Catalan: Candidatura d'Unitat Popular–Crida Constituent). The coalition was led into the 2015 election by Antonio Baños, journalist and writer, and Anna Gabriel, community worker and professor. Its 2015 candidacy also included Julià de Jòdar, historian and writer; Manuel Delgado, art historian and anthropologist; Sergi López, actor and Oleguer Presas, economist and former footballer.

Ahead of the election, the candidacy was supported by the Endavant, Poble Lliure, Internationalist Struggle, In Struggle and Corrent Roig parties and the Col·lectiu Drassanes, Constituents per la Ruptura, Arran, Sindicat d'Estudiants dels Països Catalans and Coordinadora Obrera Sindical organizations, as well as local parties Alternativa d'Esquerres de Cornellà, Alternativa d'Esquerres del Prat, Compromís per Ripollet and Alternativa Ciutadana de Rubí.

The party won 336,375 votes, almost tripling its previous results, and was awarded 10 seats in the Catalan Parliament. That placed it in the position of kingmaker, with enough seats to form a pro-independence alliance with Together for Yes, which obtained 62 seats. After three months of negotiations in which the CUP rejected the presidency of incumbent Artur Mas, the CUP and Together for Yes reached an agreement by which Carles Puigdemont, mayor of Girona, became president of Catalonia. Nevertheless, while eight CUP MPs voted in favor of Puigdemont's presidency, two abstained to "express their differences" with Together for Yes. As part of this agreement, two CUP MPs are to work closely with Together for Yes in order to ensure a pro-independence majority in the Parliament of Catalonia.

In the 2017 Catalan regional election, the CUP suffered a setback, losing more than half of their votes and six of their previous ten seats. The pro-independence parties held a majority in parliament and the CUP wasn't needed for the Torra Government to win the investiture vote. The CUP representatives therefore abstained from voting.

=== November 2019 Spanish general election ===
The CUP announced that, for the first time, it would compete in the November 2019 Spanish general election. It chose to do so because of the "exceptional democratic circumstances, marked by repression and criminalization of independentism and the repeated violation of civil and social rights on the part of the Spanish state". The party formed the Popular Unity Candidacy–For Rupture coalition together with Capgirem and incorporating Pirates of Catalonia into its lists.

=== 2021 Catalan regional election ===
Logo used while standing with Guanyem Catalunya in the 2021 Catalan regional election

In the elections to the Catalan parliament in February 2021, the CUP stood in coalition with Let's Win Catalonia (Catalan: Guanyem Catalunya), a party formed by the former mayor of Badalona, Dolors Sabater. She was the leading candidate for the coalition in the province of Barcelona. CUP-Guanyem Catalunya obtained 6.67% of the votes and, increasing its seats from 4 to 9, became the fifth largest force in the Catalan parliament.

== Electoral performance ==
=== Municipalities ===
Data	Catalonia			Valencian Community			Balearic Islands		
Data	Votes	%	Seats	Votes	%	Seats	Votes	%	Seats
1991	2,664	0.10	2 / 8,328						
1995	61	0.00	2 / 8,426						
1999	64	0.00	1 / 8,500						
2003	4,750	0.12	4 / 8,690						
2007	16,191	0.56	20 / 8,932	98	0.00	0 / 5,622			
2011	65,656	2.29	110 / 9,132	203	0.01	0 / 5,784			
2015	237,643	7.63	302 / 9,077	1,839	0.07	3 / 5,742			
2019	177,330	5.07	335 / 9,069	489	0.02	2 / 5,716			
2023	133,043	4.43	313 / 9,139	499	0.02	0 / 5,760	901	0.00	0 / 938

=== Parliament of Catalonia ===
Logo used for the 2024 Catalan regional election

Parliament of Catalonia
Election	Votes	%	#	Seats	+/–	Leading candidate	Status in legislature
2012	126,435	3.48%	7th	3 / 135	3	David Fernàndez	Opposition
2015	337,794	8.21%	6th	10 / 135	7	Antonio Baños	Confidence and supply
2017	195,246	4.46%	6th	4 / 135	6	Carles Riera	Opposition
2021	189,814	6.67%	6th	9 / 135	5	Dolors Sabater	Confidence and supply
2024	127,850	4.10%	7th	4 / 135	5	Laia Estrada	Opposition

=== Cortes Generales ===
==== Nationwide ====
Cortes Generales
Election	Congress					Senate		Leading candidate	Status in legislature
Election	Votes	%	#	Seats	+/–	Seats	+/–	Leading candidate	Status in legislature
Nov. 2019	246,971	1.02%	11th	2 / 350	2	0 / 208	0	Mireia Vehí	Opposition
2023	98,794	0.40%	12th	0 / 350	▼2	0 / 208	0	Albert Botran	Extra-parliamentary

==== Regional breakdown ====
Election	Catalonia						
Election	Congress					Senate	
Election	Votes	%	#	Seats	+/–	Seats	+/–
Nov 2019	246,971	6.37%	6th	2 / 48	2	0 / 16	0
2023	99,644	2.81%	7th	0 / 48	2	0 / 16	0
