= Manuel Delgado Ruiz =

Catalan anthropologist (born 1956)

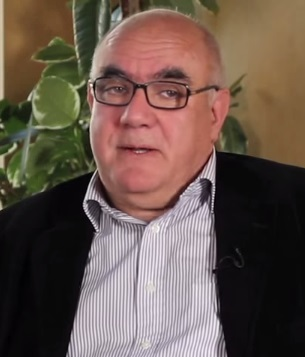
Manuel Delgado in 2012.

Manuel Delgado Ruiz (b. Barcelona, 1956) is a Spanish anthropologist.

He graduated from the University of Barcelona with a degree in Art History and later obtained a doctorate in anthropology there. He continued his graduate studies at the Religious Sciences department of the École Pratique des Hautes Études at the Sorbonne. Since 1986, he has been Professor of Religious Anthropology in the Department of Social Anthropology at his alma mater.

He was the editor of the "Biblioteca del Ciudadano" (Citizen's Library) at Ediciones Bellaterra and the "Breus Classics d'Antropologia" series at Editorial Icaria. He served as a member of the management committee for the journal Quaderns de l´ICA and currently sits on the managing board of the Institut Català d'Antropologia. He is also involved in political issues, serving as speaker of the "Study Commission on Immigration" in the Parliament of Catalonia. Religious and ritual violence has been one of his particular areas of interest, as well as the apportioning of public space and the construction of collective identities in an urban context.

== Activism and political militancy ==
Manuel Delgado has been arrested several times for his political militancy and as a social activist. During the end of the Franco regime, he was imprisoned for three months under military custody in the Model prison in Barcelona, after being beaten. His last arrest was in 2007 during a protest against real estate speculation. He is a member of the Catalan Association of Political Prisoners of the Franco regime.

Activist and member of the Central Committee of Communists of Catalonia, he participated in a symbolic place and without leaving his party on the list of the Popular Unity Candidacy - Crida Constituent in 2015.

== Selected works ==
- De la Muerte de un Dios: La Fiesta de los Toros en el Universo Simbólico de la Cultura Popular , Península (1986) ISBN 84-297-2457-5
- La Ira Sagrada. Anticlericalismo, Iconoclastia y Antiritualismo en la España Contemporánea, Humanidades (1992) ISBN 84-604-3135-5
- Las Palabras de Otro Hombre. Anticlericalismo y Misoginia, Muchnik (1993) ISBN 84-7669-181-5
- El Animal Público. Hacia una Antropología de los Espacios Urbanos, Anagrama (1999) ISBN 84-339-0580-5
- Elogi del Vianant, Edicions de 1984 (2005) ISBN 84-96061-45-0
- Sociedades Movedizas. Pasos Hacia una Antropología de las Calles, Anagrama (2007) ISBN 84-339-6251-5
- El Espacio Público como Ideología, La Catarata (2011) ISBN 84-8319-595-X
