= David Fernàndez i Ramos =

Catalan journalist and activist

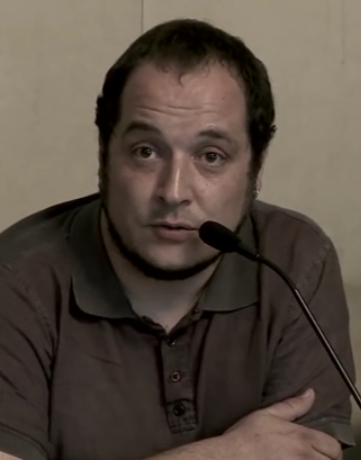
- Fernández in 2012

Member of the Parliament of Catalonia
- In office 17 December 2012 – 4 August 2015
- Constituency: Barcelona

Personal details
- Born: 24 September 1974 (age 52) Barcelona, Catalonia, Spain
- Party: Popular Unity Candidacy (since 2011)
- Education: Autonomous University of Barcelona
- Occupation: Journalist; activist; politician

David Fernàndez i Ramos (born 24 September 1974) is a Catalan journalist and activist who was a member of the Parliament of Catalonia in the tenth legislature for the Popular Unity Candidacy (CUP) from 17 December 2012 to 4 August 2015.

== Biography ==
Born on 24 September 1974, in Barcelona, he spent the first years of his life in Ripoll (Ripollès). His paternal grandfather, Saturnino Fernández, with whom he identified politically, was a communist, republican, and staunch anti-Franco militant. He studied at the high schools of La Sedeta and Vila de Gràcia, both in Barcelona. He became politically active in the early 1990s. At university, he studied Political Science at the Autonomous University of Barcelona (UAB) but dropped out in the third year of his degree. He spent two years working as a sheet metal worker in the SEAT car factory, until an injury forced him to leave.

In 2006 he published a critical inquiry into the repressive behaviour of the Spanish police Cròniques del 6 i altres retalls de la claveguera policial. On November 13, 2012, together with Julià de Jòdar, he published an explanatory work on the origins and the aims of the Popular Unity Candidacy, entitled Cop de CUP. In 2013, this was followed by Foc a la barraca, a collection of his articles written in previous years.

He is both a writer and editor of the weekly publication, La Directa.

He has been active in the Catalan cooperative, alternative economy and ethical finance movements.

== Institutional activity ==
Despite never having been a member of any party, he ran for the first time in the 2011 municipal elections in Barcelona in 14th place on the list of the CUP-Alternative for Barcelona (CUP-AB). In October 2012, he became head of the list of the CUP-Alternativa d'Esquerres for Barcelona in the elections to the Parliament of Catalonia in 2012. In those elections, the CUP won three seats, all from the constituency of Barcelona, and Fernández thus became on November 25 the elected deputy of the tenth legislature of the Parliament of Catalonia.

Throughout his parliamentary term, Fernández became particularly well-known for his criticism of the corruption of bankers and politicians in the Parliament of Catalonia's commission of inquiry into the Spanish financial crisis that began in 2008. In November 2013, when the former president of Bankia and former managing director of the IMF Rodrigo Rato was called to testify to this commission, Fernandez ended up brandishing his sandal in an Arab gesture of contempt, and told Rato: “See you soon, gangster!”

In 2014 he was appointed chairman of the Catalan Parliament's commission of inquiry into tax fraud and evasion and political corruption.

== Artistic activity ==
He has participated in musical performances in homage to Ovidi Montllor together with Borja Penalba and David Caño forming the musical group Ovidi3, which has become Ovidi4, including the Valencian singer Mireia Vives.

== Intervention of communications ==
In 2020, David Fernández’s cell phone was tapped using the Pegasus spyware program pursuant to a court order issued by the National Court at the request of the Civil Guard, along with the phones of forty other activists, as part of an investigation into the Tsunami Democràtic movement, although Fernández was not a subject of the investigation.
