= Meritxell Borràs =

Spanish politician (born 1964)

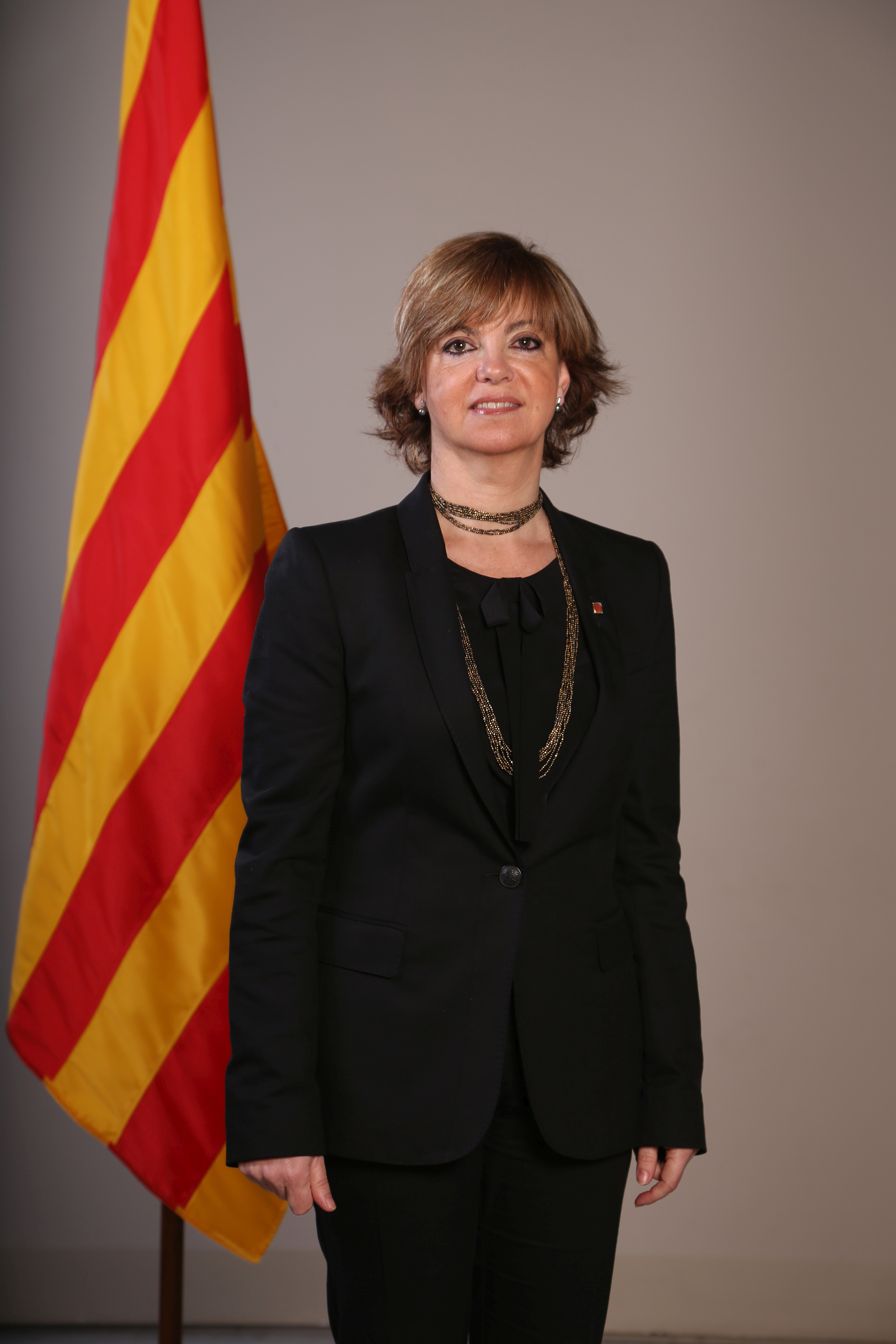

Counselor of Governance and Institutional Relations (Note: Minister of Governance, Public Administration and Housing from January 2016.)
- In office 22 June 2015 – 27 October 2017
- President: Artur Mas; Carles Puigdemont
- Preceded by: Joana Ortega
- Succeeded by: Jordi Puigneró (Direct rule until 2 June 2018)

Member of the Catalan Parliament for the Province of Barcelona
- In office 5 December 1995 – 24 August 1999
- In office 1 February 2000 – 23 September 2003
- In office 4 May 2005 – 4 August 2015

Member of the City Council of L'Hospitalet de Llobregat
- In office 1995–2015

Personal details
- Born: Meritxell Borràs i Solé; 12 April 1964 (age 62) L'Hospitalet de Llobregat, Catalonia, Spain
- Party: Junts (2020–present)
- Other political affiliations: Nationalist Youth of Catalonia (formerly); CDC (1981–2016); PDeCAT (2016–2020)
- Spouse: Antoni Asensio Ollé (m. 2018)
- Children: 2
- Education: University of Barcelona
- Website: Meritxell Borràs

Meritxell Borràs i Solé (born 12 April 1964) is a Spanish politician and pharmacist from Catalonia. Borràs served as Catalonia's Minister of Governance and Institutional Relations from June 2015 to October 2017 when she was removed from office following the Catalan declaration of independence.

Born in 1964 in L'Hospitalet de Llobregat, Borràs graduated from the University of Barcelona before working in the pharmaceutical sector. A supporter of Catalan independence, Borràs was a member of the Nationalist Youth of Catalonia whilst a student. She was elected to the Municipality of L'Hospitalet de Llobregat and Parliament of Catalonia in 1995. She was appointed Minister of the Governance and Institutional Relations for Catalonia in June 2015.

On 1 October 2017 an independence referendum was held in Catalonia despite the Constitutional Court ruling that it breached the Spanish constitution. 92% supported independence though turnout was 43% due to a boycott by unionists. The Catalan Parliament declared independence on 27 October 2017 which resulted in the Spanish government imposing direct rule on Catalonia, dismissing the Catalan government. The Catalan Parliament was dissolved and fresh elections called. On 30 October 2017 charges of rebellion, sedition and misuse of public funds were brought against Borràs and other members of the Catalan government. Borràs and Puigdemont, along with others, fled to Belgium but Borràs later returned to Spain. On 2 November 2017 Borràs and seven other Catalan ministers were remanded in custody by the Audiencia Nacional. Six of the ministers, including Borràs, were released on bail on 4 December 2017. On 23 March 2018 a Supreme Court judge ordered that Borràs be tried for embezzlement and disobedience.

== Early life and family ==
Borràs was born on 12 April 1964 in L'Hospitalet de Llobregat, a municipality in the Province of Barcelona in eastern Catalonia, Spain. She is the daughter of Jacint Borràs, one of the founders of the Democratic Convergence of Catalonia (CDC), a conservative Catalan nationalist political party, now known as the Catalan European Democratic Party (PDeCAT).

After school Borràs joined the University of Barcelona, graduating in 1988 with a degree in pharmacy. She received a Master of Business Administration from the university in 1990. She founded the Hospitalet de Llobregat branch of the Nationalist Youth of Catalonia (JNC) in 1981 and served as its president. She also sat on the JNC's National Executive Committee, with responsibility for communication and training. Borràs joined the CDC in 1982 and has been a member of its national council, executive committee and steering committee. She is a member of the Catalan National Assembly (ANC), Òmnium Cultural and FC Barcelona.

== Career ==
After university Borràs worked in the Menarini laboratories for seven years and in the Almirall laboratories for two years.

Borràs contested the 1995 local elections as a Convergence and Union (CiU) electoral alliance candidate in L'Hospitalet de Llobrega and was elected. She was re-elected at the 1999, 2003, 2007 and 2011 local elections. She did not seek re-election at the 2015 local elections, giving way to Jordi Monrós as the CIU's leading candidate in L'Hospitalet de Llobrega.

Borràs contested the 1995 regional election as a Convergence and Union (CiU) electoral alliance candidate in the Province of Barcelona and was elected to the Parliament of Catalonia. At the 1999 regional election Borràs was placed 33rd on the CiU's list of candidates in Barcelona but the alliance only managed to win 31 seats in the province and as a result she failed to get re-elected. However, in February 2000, she was appointed to the Catalan Parliament to replace Andreu Mas-Colell.

At the 2003 regional election Borràs was placed 28th on the CiU's list of candidates in Barcelona but the alliance only managed to win 25 seats in the province and as a result she failed to get re-elected. However, in May 2005, she was appointed to the Catalan Parliament to replace Jaume Camps i Rovira. She was re-elected at the 2006, 2010 and 2012 regional elections. She was appointed Minister of Governance and Institutional Relations for Catalonia in June 2015. For the 2015 regional election the CDC joined with Republican Left of Catalonia (ERC) and other pro-independence parties to form the Junts pel Sí (JxSí) electoral alliance. Borràs was amongst several CDC MPs who failed to receive nomination at the election as the alliance sought to include independent candidates on its lists. Borràs remained a member of the Executive Council of Catalonia and January 2016 news President Carles Puigdemont expanded her portfolio to include housing.

=== Catalonia independence crisis and imprisonment ===
In June 2017 President of Catalonia Carles Puigdemont announced that a referendum on Catalan independence would be held on 1 October 2017. The Catalan Parliament passed legislation on 6 September 2017 authorising the referendum which would be binding and based on a simple majority without a minimum threshold. The following day Constitutional Court of Spain suspended the legislation, blocking the referendum. The Spanish government put into effect Operation Anubis in order to disrupt the organisation of the referendum and arrested Catalan government officials. Despite this the referendum went ahead though it was boycotted by unionists and turnout was only 43%. 92% of those who voted supported independence. Around 900 people were injured as the Spanish police used violence to try to prevent voting in the referendum.

On 27 October 2017 the Catalan Parliament declared independence in a vote boycotted by opposition MPs. Almost immediately the Senate of Spain invoked article 155 of the constitution, dismissing Puigdemont and the Catalan government and imposing direct rule on Catalonia. The following day Spanish Prime Minister Mariano Rajoy dissolved the Catalan Parliament and called for fresh regional elections on 21 December 2017. On 30 October 2017 Spanish Attorney General José Manuel Maza laid charges of rebellion, sedition and misuse of public funds at the Audiencia Nacional against Puigdemont, Borràs and other members of the Catalan government. The charges carry maximum sentences of 30, 15 and 6 years in prison respectively.

Borràs, Puigdemont and four other Catalan ministers (Dolors Bassa, Antoni Comín, Joaquim Forn and Meritxell Serret) arrived in Belgium on 30 October 2017. According to Spanish media the group had driven to Marseille shortly after the charges were laid before the Audiencia Nacional and from there flown to Brussels. Borrás then returned to Spain.

On 2 November 2017 Audiencia Nacional judge Carmen Lamela remanded in custody Borrás and seven other Catalan ministers (Bassa, Forn, Oriol Junqueras, Carles Mundó, Raül Romeva, Josep Rull and Jordi Turull) as she considered them a flight risk. The jailed ministers were separated and sent to five different prisons: Bassa and Borrás to Alcalá, Junqueras and Forn to Estremera, Mundó to Aranjuez prison, Romeva and Turull to Valdemoro and Rull to Navalcarnero. A ninth minister, Santi Vila, was freed on bail as he had resigned from the government the day before the declaration of independence, but had to spend a night in Estremera prison whilst his lawyers secured his €50,000 bail. According to their lawyer Jaume Alonso-Cuevillas, the ministers were mistreated whilst being transported to prison. They were allegedly handcuffed behind their backs without seat belts in a van going very fast, forced to listen to the Spanish national anthem on a loop and threatened by their guards. Mundo allegedly suffered injuries due to the handcuffs and two ministers were allegedly forced to strip to prevent them carrying anything into prison. Earlier, as the ministers arrived at the Audiencia Nacional, Spanish police officers were shown, in video obtained Reuters and published by the La Vanguardia, making sneering, homophobic comments about the ministers, with one officer saying "Wait till you see what they do to the little teddy bear", referring to Junqueras, "When they get him on all fours, they’ll fix his eye".

On 1 December 2017 the eight jailed ministers and two jailed independence activists - Jordi Cuixart and Jordi Sànchez i Picanyol - appeared before Supreme Court judge Pablo Llarena to request bail while they await trial. They renounced the declaration of independence, pledged support for the imposition of direct rule and agreed to work within the law. On 4 December 2017 Llarena released, after 32 days in prison, six of the ministers (Bassa, Borrás, Mundó, Romeva, Rull and Turull) on bail of €100,000 but ordered that their passports be confiscated. However, Forn and Junqueras, together with Cuixart and Sànchez, were refused bail.

After a four-month judicial investigation into the referendum and declaration of independence Supreme Court judge Pablo Llarena issued a 70-page ruling on 23 March 2018 in which he ordered that 25 of the 28 Catalan politicians and activists under investigation be tried for rebellion, embezzlement or disobedience. Borràs was charged with disobeying an order of the Constitutional Court (article 410 of the criminal code) and embezzlement. The judge also ordered 14 of the accused, including Borràs, to collectively pay €2.1 million to cover the costs of the referendum and judicial investigation.

The trial began on 12 February 2019 and ended and was remitted to decision on 12 June 2019.

On 14 October 2019, Borràs was sentenced to a year and 8 months of disqualification and a fine of €60,000 for disobedience.

== Personal life ==
Borràs married partner Antoni Asensio Ollé in March 2018. They have two sons, Bernat and Eudald.

== Electoral history ==
Electoral history of Meritxell Borràs
| Election | Constituency | Party | Alliance | No. | Result |
|---|---|---|---|---|---|
| 1995 local | L'Hospitalet de Llobregat | Democratic Convergence of Catalonia | Convergence and Union | 4 | Elected |
| 1995 regional | Province of Barcelona | Democratic Convergence of Catalonia | Convergence and Union | 31 | Elected |
| 1999 local | L'Hospitalet de Llobregat | Democratic Convergence of Catalonia | Convergence and Union | 1 | Elected |
| 1999 regional | Province of Barcelona | Democratic Convergence of Catalonia | Convergence and Union | 33 | Not elected |
| 2003 local | L'Hospitalet de Llobregat | Democratic Convergence of Catalonia | Convergence and Union | 1 | Elected |
| 2003 regional | Province of Barcelona | Democratic Convergence of Catalonia | Convergence and Union | 28 | Not elected |
| 2006 regional | Province of Barcelona | Democratic Convergence of Catalonia | Convergence and Union | 4 | Elected |
| 2007 local | L'Hospitalet de Llobregat | Democratic Convergence of Catalonia | Convergence and Union | 1 | Elected |
| 2010 regional | Province of Barcelona | Democratic Convergence of Catalonia | Convergence and Union | 4 | Elected |
| 2011 local | L'Hospitalet de Llobregat | Democratic Convergence of Catalonia | Convergence and Union | 1 | Elected |
| 2012 regional | Province of Barcelona | Democratic Convergence of Catalonia | Convergence and Union | 6 | Elected |
