= Josep-Lluís =

Josep-Lluís is a masculine given name. Notable people with this name include:

- Josep-Lluís Carod-Rovira (born 1952), Spanish politician
- Josep-Lluís Serrano Pentinat (born 1977), Spanish Catholic prelate
