= Jordi Ausàs =

Spanish politician

Jordi Ausàs i Coll
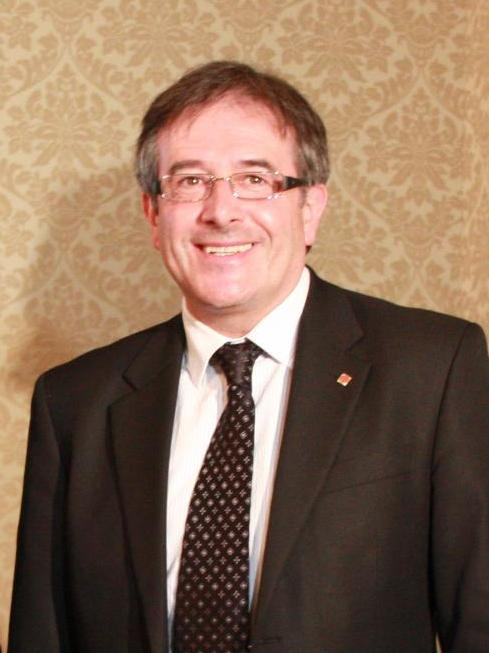
- Ausàs in 2010

Counsellor of Governance and Public Administration of the Generalitat de Catalunya
- In office 12 March 2008 – 29 December 2010
- President: José Montilla
- Vice President: Josep-Lluís Carod-Rovira
- Preceded by: Joan Puigcercós
- Succeeded by: Joana Ortega (as Counsellor of Governance and Institutional Relations)

Mayor of La Seu d'Urgell
- In office July 2003 – 11 March 2008
- Preceded by: Joan Ganyet i Solé
- Succeeded by: Albert Batalla i Siscart

Personal details
- Born: 3 March 1960 (age 66) La Seu d'Urgell, Alt Urgell, Catalonia, Spain
- Party: Republican Left of Catalonia
- Children: Pol, Martí and Bernat
- Occupation: Teacher and Politician

Jordi Ausàs i Coll (born 3 March 1960) is a Spanish politician from Catalonia, Mayor of La Seu d'Urgell from 2003 to 2008 and Minister of Governance and Public Administration of Catalonia in the José Montilla government (2008–2010). He is a member of Republican Left of Catalonia (ERC).

He is a Catalan language teacher in the University of Barcelona. He was a director of the Andorran School of Escaldes-Engordany in the Principality of Andorra.

Since 2003 he has been the Mayor of La Seu d'Urgell, in the Province of Lleida, he was reelected on 27 May 2007. Since 30 November 1995 he has been a deputy in the Parliament of Catalonia for Lleida province. He was the president of the Commission of Agriculture, Livestock and Fisheries (29 November 1999 – 17 December 2003).

In the 2008 Spanish general election he was a candidate for Lleida Province, but failed to hold the ERC seat, which was gained by José Ignacio Llorens, the candidate of the People's Party.

On 10 March 2008, Joan Puigcercós resigned, and Ausàs succeeded him.

Political offices
Preceded by Joan Puigcercós	Counsellor of Governance and Public Administration of the Generalitat de Catalunya; 2008–2010	Succeeded by Joana Ortega (as Counsellor of Governance and Institutional Relations)
Preceded by Joan Ganyet i Solé	Mayor of La Seu d'Urgell; 2003–2008	Succeeded by Albert Batalla i Siscart
