= List of ministers of governance, public administration and housing of Catalonia =

Minister of Governance, Public Administration and Housing of Catalonia
- Conseller de Governació, Administracions Públiques i Habitatge de Catalunya
- Seal of the Generalitat of Catalonia

- Flag of Catalonia
- Incumbent; Vacant since 28 October 2017
- Department of Governance, Public Administration and Housing
- Member of: Executive Council of Catalonia
- Reports to: President of Catalonia
- Seat: Barcelona
- Appointer: President of Catalonia
- Inaugural holder: Joan Casanovas i Maristany
- Formation: 28 April 1931
- Website: Department of Governance, Public Administration and Housing, Catalonia

This article lists the ministers of governance, public administration and housing of Catalonia.

== List ==
Ministers of Governance
| Name | Portrait | Party | Took office | Left office | President | Ministerial title | Refs |
|---|---|---|---|---|---|---|---|
| Joan Casanovas i Maristany | | Republican Left of Catalonia | 28 April 1931 | 29 December 1931 | Francesc Macià | Minister of Governance | |
| Josep Tarradellas | | Republican Left of Catalonia | 29 December 1931 | 20 November 1932 | Francesc Macià | Minister of Governance | |
| Josep Tarradellas | | Republican Left of Catalonia | 19 December 1932 | 24 January 1933 | Francesc Macià | Minister of Governance and Health | |
| Joan Selves i Carner | | Republican Left of Catalonia | 24 January 1933 | 4 October 1933 | Francesc Macià | Minister of Governance | |
| Pere Mestres i Albet | | Republican Left of Catalonia | 4 October 1933 | 3 January 1934 | Francesc Macià | Minister of Governance | |
| Joan Selves i Carner | | Republican Left of Catalonia | 3 January 1934 | 28 June 1934 | Lluís Companys | Minister of Governance | |
| Josep Dencàs i Puigdollers | | Republican Left of Catalonia | 28 June 1934 | 13 October 1934 | Lluís Companys | Minister of Governance | |
| Josep Maria Espanya i Sirat | | Republican Left of Catalonia | 1 March 1936 | 26 September 1936 | Lluís Companys | Minister of Governance | |
| Artemi Aiguader i Miró | | Republican Left of Catalonia | 26 September 1936 | 5 May 1937 | Lluís Companys | Minister of Internal Security | |
| Carles Martí i Feced | | Republican Left of Catalonia | 5 May 1937 | 29 June 1937 | Lluís Companys | Minister of Governance, Finance and Culture | |
| Antoni Maria Sbert i Massanet | | Republican Left of Catalonia | 29 June 1937 | 2 February 1939 | Lluís Companys | Minister of Governance and Social Assistance | |
| Frederic Rahola i d'Espona | | Republican Left of Catalonia | 5 December 1977 | 19 October 1978 | Josep Tarradellas | Minister of Governance | |
| Manuel Ortínez i Mur | | Independent | 19 October 1978 | 15 December 1979 | Josep Tarradellas | Minister of Governance | |
| Josep Maria Bricall i Massip | | Independent | 15 December 1979 | 28 April 1980 | Josep Tarradellas | Minister of Governance | |
| Joan Vidal i Gayolà | | Democratic Convergence of Catalonia | 8 May 1980 | 24 August 1982 | Jordi Pujol | Minister of Governance | |
| Macià Alavedra | | Democratic Convergence of Catalonia | 24 August 1982 | 9 May 1986 | Jordi Pujol | Minister of Governance | |
| Agustí Maria Bassols i Parés | | Democratic Union of Catalonia | 9 May 1986 | 4 July 1988 | Jordi Pujol | Minister of Governance | |
| Josep Gomis i Martí | | Democratic Convergence of Catalonia | 4 July 1988 | 22 December 1992 | Jordi Pujol | Minister of Governance | |
| Maria Eugènia Cuenca i Valero | | Democratic Convergence of Catalonia | 22 December 1992 | 1 February 1995 | Jordi Pujol | Minister of Governance | |
| Xavier Pomés i Abella | | Democratic Convergence of Catalonia | 1 February 1995 | 29 November 1999 | Jordi Pujol | Minister of Governance | |
| Josep Antoni Duran i Lleida | | Democratic Union of Catalonia | 29 November 1999 | 5 February 2001 | Jordi Pujol | Minister of Governance and Institutional Relations | |
| Núria de Gispert | | Democratic Union of Catalonia | 5 February 2001 | 4 November 2002 | Jordi Pujol | Minister of Governance and Institutional Relations | |
| Josep Maria Pelegrí i Aixutt | | Democratic Union of Catalonia | 4 November 2002 | 17 December 2003 | Jordi Pujol | Minister of Governance and Institutional Relations | |
| Joan Carretero | | Republican Left of Catalonia | 17 December 2003 | 20 April 2006 | Pasqual Maragall | Minister of Governance and Public Administration | |
| Xavier Vendrell | | Republican Left of Catalonia | 20 April 2006 | 11 May 2006 | Pasqual Maragall | Minister of Governance and Public Administration | |
| Xavier Sabaté i Ibarz | | Socialists' Party of Catalonia | 11 May 2006 | 29 November 2006 | Pasqual Maragall | Minister of Governance and Public Administration | |
| Joan Puigcercós | | Republican Left of Catalonia | 29 November 2006 | 12 March 2008 | José Montilla | Minister of Governance and Public Administration | |
| Jordi Ausàs | | Republican Left of Catalonia | 12 March 2008 | 29 December 2010 | José Montilla | Minister of Governance and Public Administration | |
| Joana Ortega | | Democratic Union of Catalonia | 29 December 2010 | 22 June 2015 | Artur Mas | Minister of Governance and Institutional Relations | |
| Meritxell Borràs | | Democratic Convergence of Catalonia | 22 June 2015 | 14 January 2016 | Artur Mas | Minister of Governance and Institutional Relations | |
| Meritxell Borràs | | Democratic Convergence of Catalonia | 14 January 2016 | 28 October 2017 | Carles Puigdemont | Minister of Governance, Public Administration and Housing | |
