= Joan Puigcercós =

Spanish politician

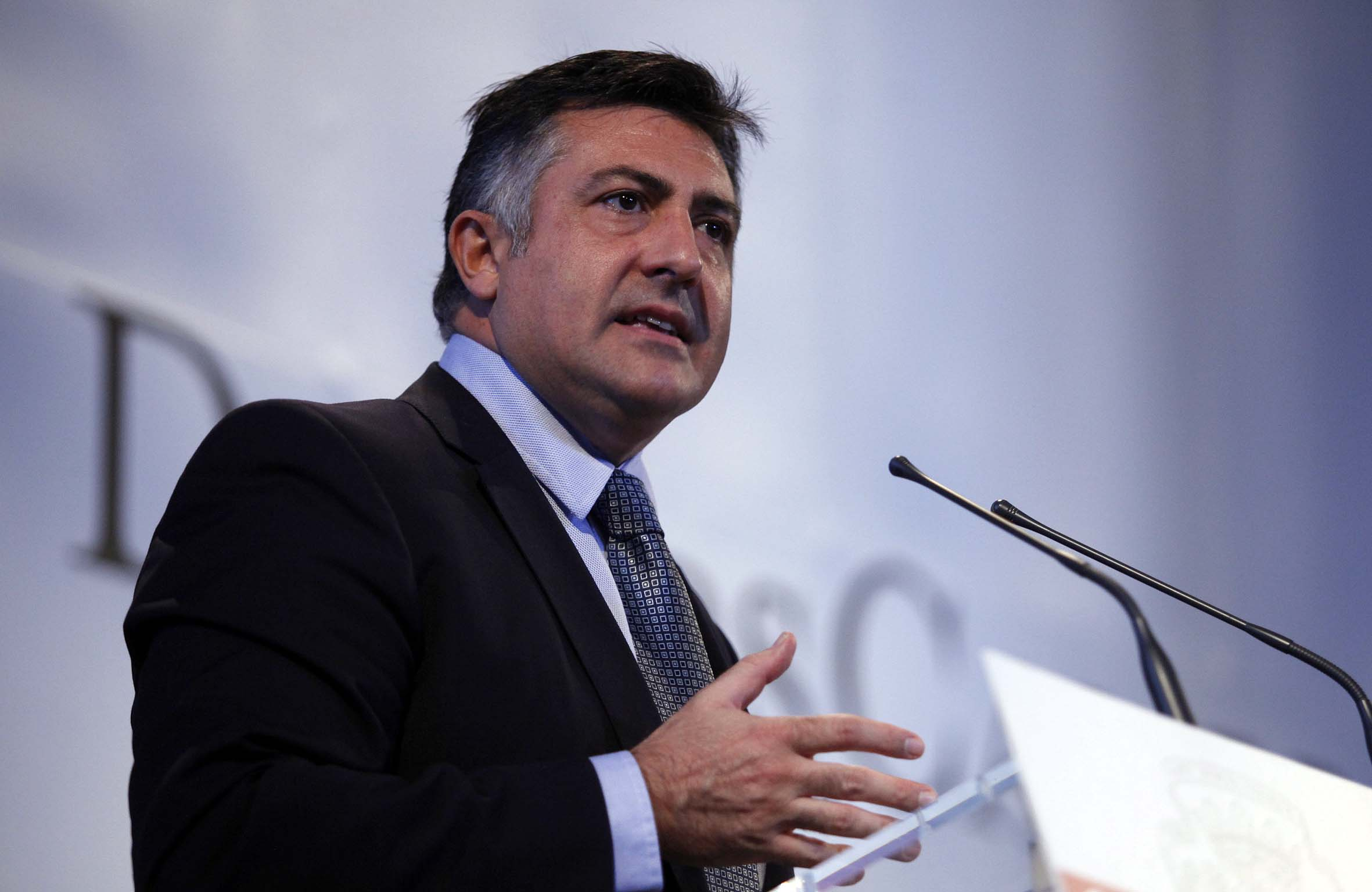

16th Counsellor of Governance and Public Administration of the Generalitat de Catalunya
- In office 29 November 2006 – 10 March 2008
- President: José Montilla
- Vice President: Josep-Lluís Carod-Rovira
- Preceded by: Xavier Sabaté i Ibarz
- Succeeded by: Jordi Ausàs

9th President of ERC
- In office 7 June 2008 – 17 September 2011
- Preceded by: Josep-Lluís Carod-Rovira
- Succeeded by: Oriol Junqueras

10th General Secretary of ERC
- In office 4 July 2004 – 7 June 2008
- President: Josep-Lluís Carod-Rovira
- Preceded by: Josep-Lluís Carod-Rovira
- Succeeded by: Joan Ridao i Martín

Personal details
- Born: 2 December 1966 (age 59) Ripoll, Spain
- Party: Republican Left of Catalonia
- Occupation: Politician

Joan Puigcercós (Catalan pronunciation: [ʒuˈam ˌputʃsəɾˈkos]; born 2 December 1966 in Ripoll, Spain) is a Spanish Catalan politician who had served as president of the Republican Left of Catalonia (2008–2011). He studied philosophy and political science at the UAB.

== Civic background ==
He was a member of the Sports and Wealth Club in Ripoll, where he acted as president of youth area between 1986 and 1988.

== Political background ==
Joan Puigcercós was affiliated with Independentistes dels Països Catalans (Independentists of the Catalan Countries) between 1983 and 1985, and with Crida a la Solidaritat (Call to Solidarity) between 1985 and 1987. He was member of the Assemblea d’Estudiants Independentistes d’Universitat (Assembly of Independentist University Students) (1984–1989).

Puigcercós joined Esquerra Republicana de Catalunya (ERC) in 1987, joining the National Executive. He also was secretary-general of the JERC between 1987 and 1994, and president of the regional division of ERC in Girona (1993–1996). From 1996 to 2001, he served as vice secretary-general of ERC. In the 24th National Congress, held in Lleida 3 and 4 July 2004, he was elected secretary-general of ERC. On 7 June 2008, he was elected president of the party, succeeding Josep-Lluís Carod-Rovira. He was succeeded as secretary general by Joan Ridao i Martín.

Joan Puigcercós is a member of the Josep Irla Foundation Patronate.

== Institutional background ==
Councillor in Ripoll Town Council (1987–1991). Deputy of the Catalan Parliament (1992–2000). He represented Barcelona in the Spanish Congress from 2000 until 2004. Since 2004, he has been the spokesperson of his parliamentary group and president of the environmental commission.

Political offices
Preceded by Xavier Sabaté i Ibarz	Counsellor of Governance and Public Administration of the Generalitat de Catalunya; 2006–2008	Succeeded by Jordi Ausàs
Party political offices
Preceded by Josep-Lluís Carod-Rovira	President of ERC; 2008–2011	Succeeded by Oriol Junqueras
Preceded by Josep-Lluís Carod-Rovira	General Secretary of ERC; 2004–2008	Succeeded by Joan Ridao i Martín
