= Citizens for Change =

Citizens for Change Ciutadans pel Canvi
- Founded: 1999
- Dissolved: 13 December 2011
- Ideology: Social democracy Catalanism; Federalism; Republicanism
- Political position: Centre-left
- National affiliation: Socialists' Party of Catalonia (1999–2010)

Citizens for Change (Catalan: Ciutadans pel Canvi, CpC) was a political platform in Catalonia created in 1999 to support Pasqual Maragall's bid to the presidency of the Government of Catalonia in order to put an end to the hegemony of Jordi Pujol's Convergence and Union after two decades in government. After Maragall's first and only term in office, CpC was reformed as a civic-political association. It contested the 1999, 2003 and 2006 regional elections in alliance with the Socialists' Party of Catalonia (PSC).

The alliance with the PSC was not maintained for the 2010 election. In an extraordinary assembly held on 13 December 2011, the organization chose to disband.
