= 2003 Catalan regional election =

Election in the Spanish region of Catalonia

- 16 November 2003

All 135 seats in the Parliament of Catalonia 68 seats needed for a majority
- Opinion polls
- Registered: 5,307,837 ▲0.3%
- Turnout: 3,319,276 (62.5%) ▲3.3 pp
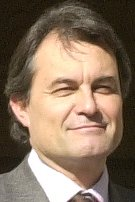

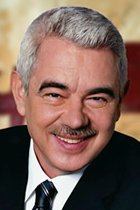

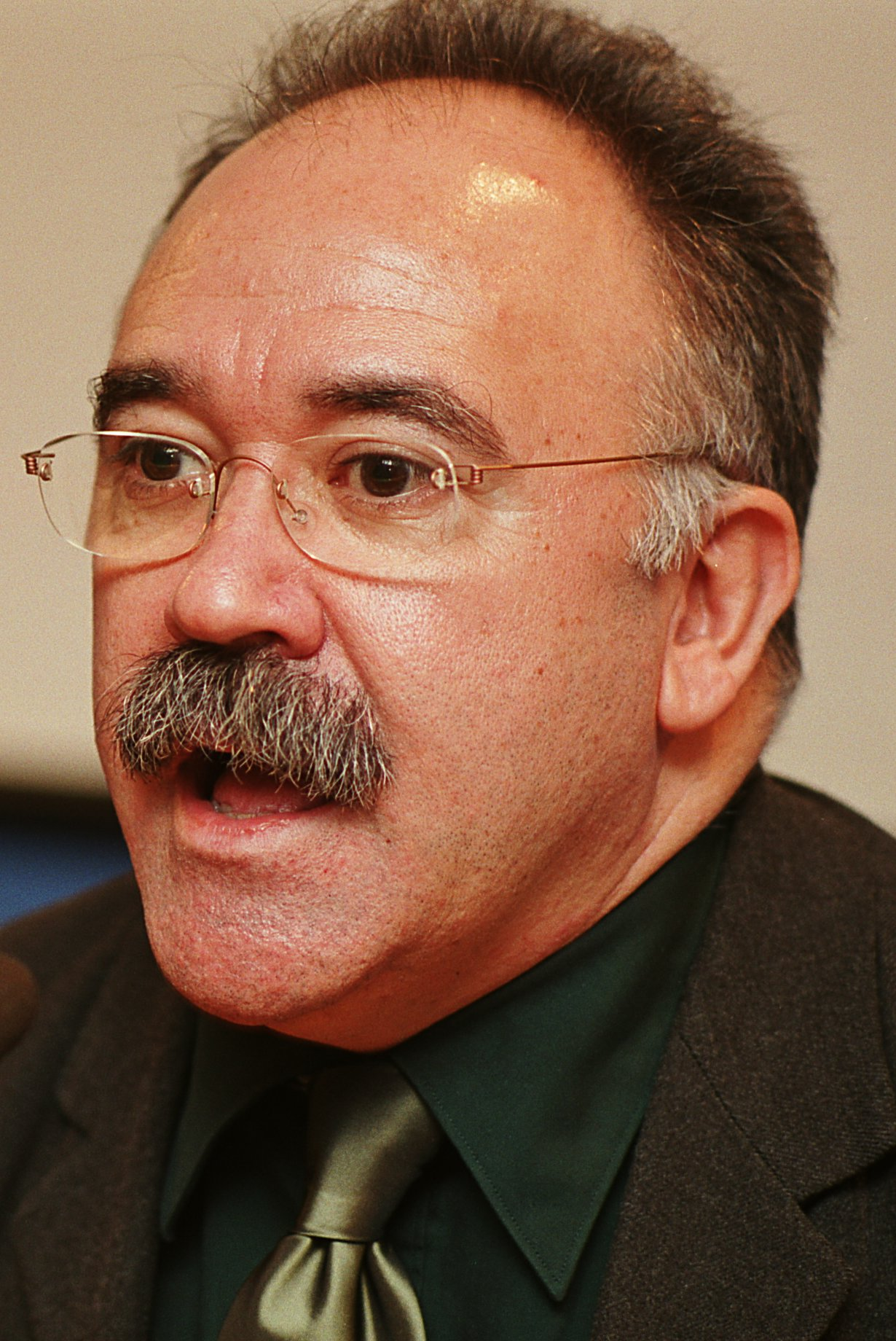

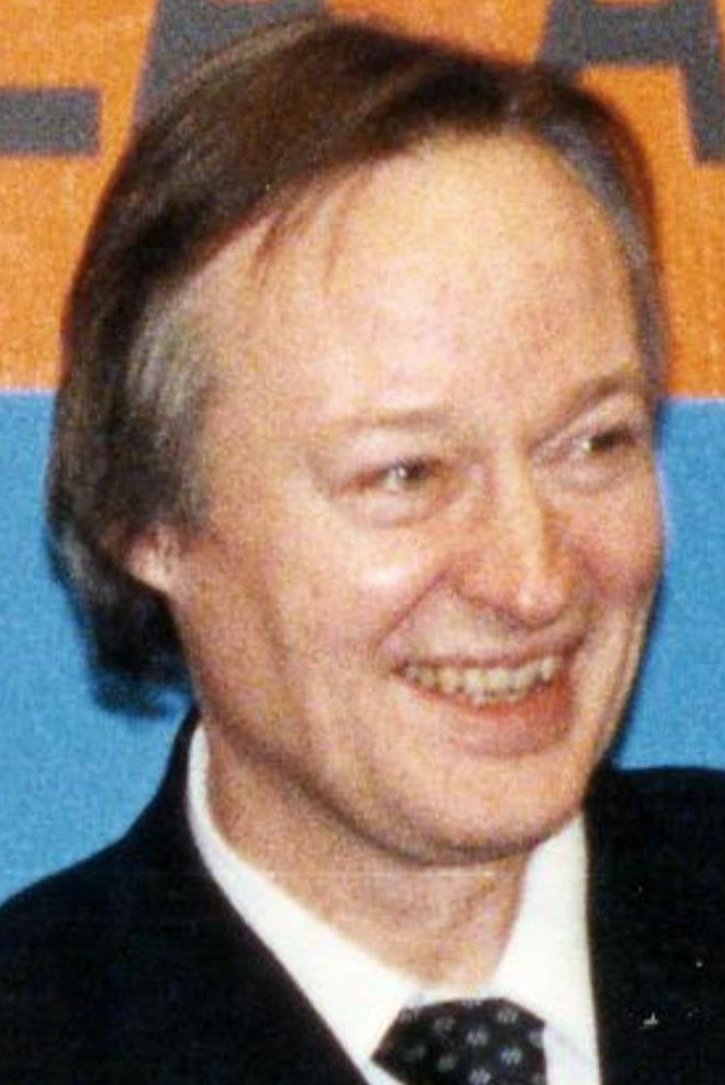

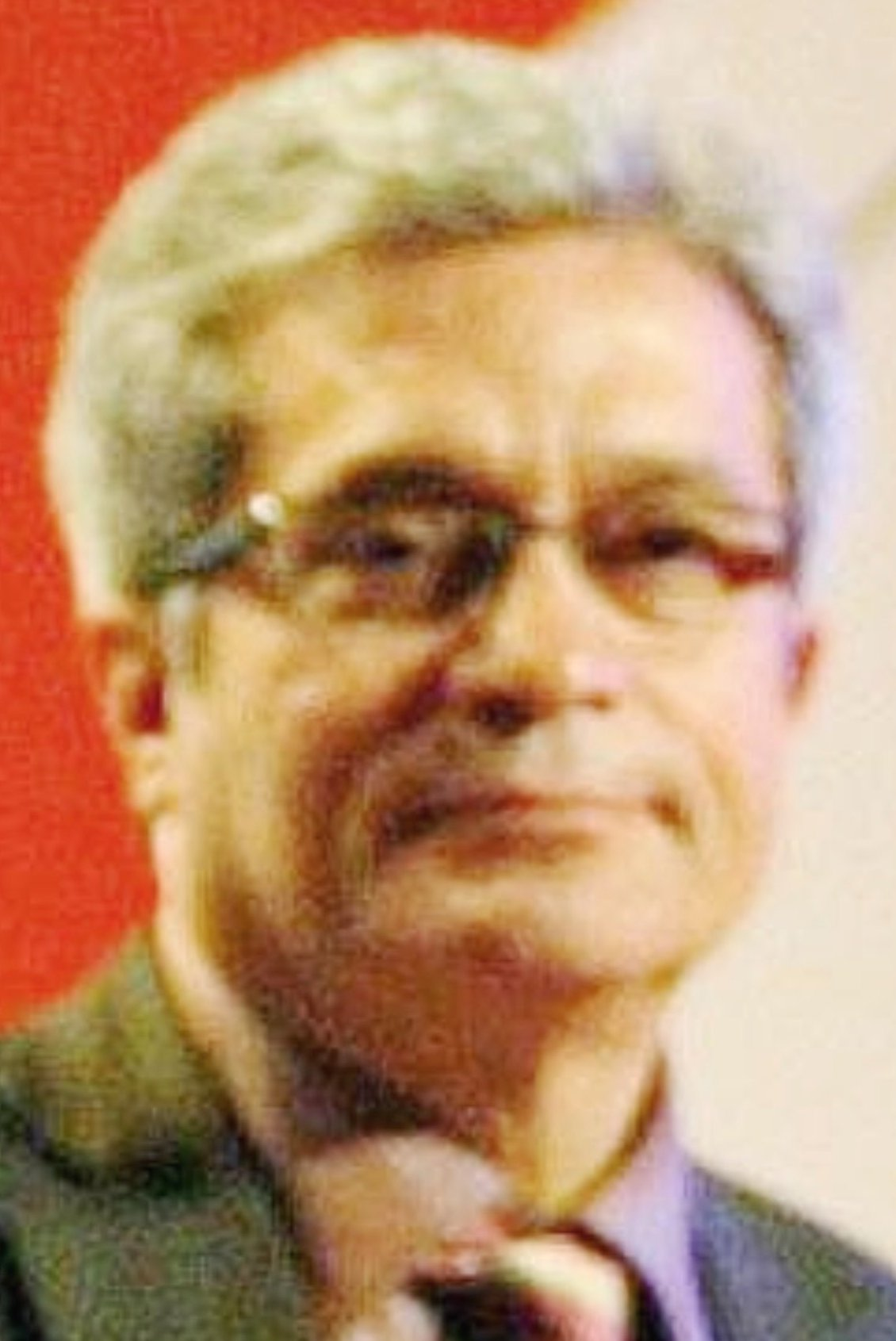
	First party	Second party	Third party
Leader	Artur Mas	Pasqual Maragall	Josep-Lluís Carod-Rovira
Party	CiU	PSC–CpC	ERC
Leader since	7 January 2002	6 March 1999	25 November 1996
Leader's seat	Barcelona	Barcelona	Barcelona
Last election	56 seats, 37.7%	52 seats, 37.9%	12 seats, 8.7%
Seats won	46	42	23
Seat change	▼10	▼10	▲11
Popular vote	1,024,425	1,031,454	544,324
Percentage	30.9%	31.2%	16.4%
Swing	▼6.8 pp	▼6.7 pp	▲7.7 pp
	Fourth party	Fifth party
Leader	Josep Piqué	Joan Saura
Party	PP	ICV–EA
Leader since	4 September 2003	26 November 2000
Leader's seat	Barcelona	Barcelona
Last election	12 seats, 9.5%	3 seats, 3.9% (Note: Results for IC–V (2.5%, 3 seats) and EUiA (1.4%, 0 seats) in the 1999 election.)
Seats won	15	9
Seat change	▲3	▲6
Popular vote	393,499	241,163
Percentage	11.9%	7.3%
Swing	▲2.4 pp	▲3.4 pp
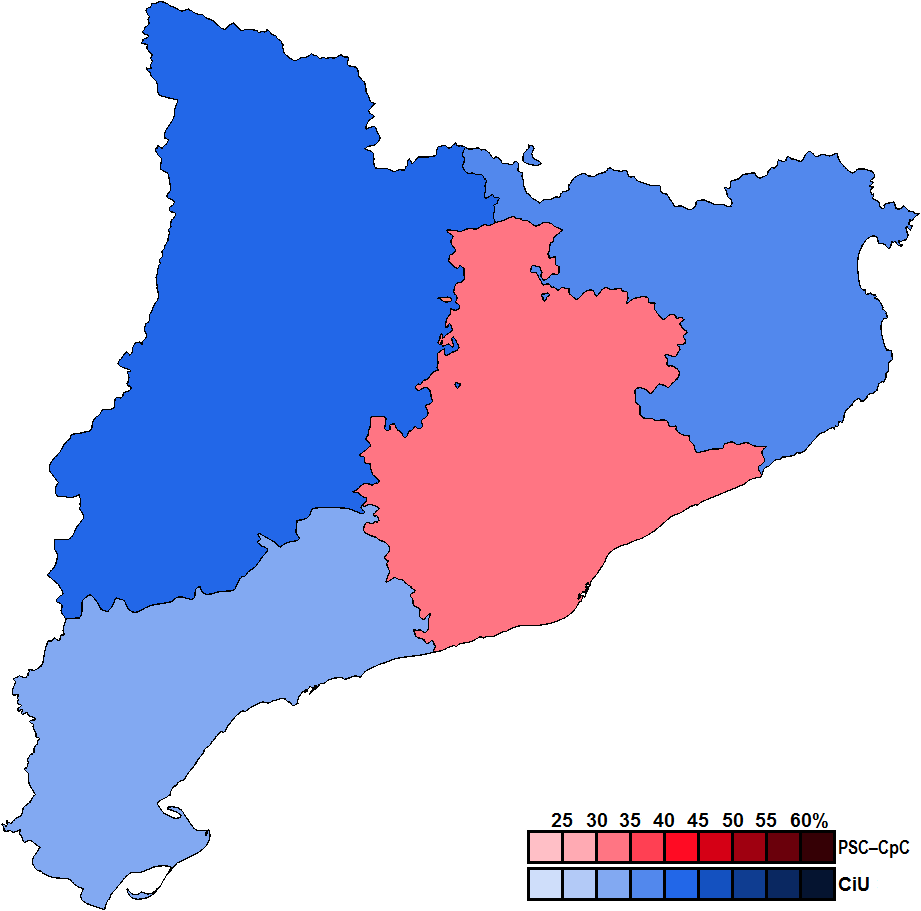
President before election
Jordi Pujol
CiU
President after election
Pasqual Maragall
PSC

A regional election was held in Catalonia on 16 November 2003 to elect the 7th Parliament of the autonomous community. All 135 seats in the Parliament were up for election.

This election marked a change for all Catalan political parties due to Catalan president Jordi Pujol's decision not to seek a seventh term in office and to retire from active politics. The election results were a great disappointment for Pasqual Maragall's Socialists' Party of Catalonia (PSC), which again saw Convergence and Union (CiU) winning a plurality of seats despite them winning the most votes by a margin of just 0.3%. Opinion polls earlier in the year had predicted a much larger victory for Maragall, but his lead over CiU had begun to narrow as the election grew nearer. Republican Left of Catalonia (ERC) was perceived as the true victor of the election, doubling its 1999 figures and scoring its best result in its recent history up to that point, both in terms of seats (23 of 135) and votes (16.4%), up from 11 seats and 8.7%.

As Pujol's successor Artur Mas did not win a majority large enough to renew his party pact with the People's Party (PP), which had kept Pujol in power since 1995, an alliance between the PSC, ERC and ICV–EUiA resulted in a Catalan "tripartite" government. Thus, despite losing 10 seats and 150,000 votes compared to the 1999 election, Maragall became the first centre-left president of the Government of Catalonia, ending with 23 uninterrupted years of CiU rule.

== Background ==
In the 1999 election, and as a result of the Socialists' Party of Catalonia (PSC)'s growth, the Catalan nationalist Convergence and Union (CiU) had lost the vote share in a regional election for the first time ever, but clung on to retain the largest amount of seats due to the disproportionate allocation of seats in Girona, Lleida and Tarragona compared to Barcelona. Through to the support of the People's Party (PP), Jordi Pujol had been able to be re-elected to a sixth term in office with a slim majority of 68 to the 67 seats commanded by the left-from-centre opposition.

Despite Pujol's personal approval ratings remaining high until the end of his term, speculation on his possible retirement (which he confirmed on 1 April 2001), internal disputes between Democratic Convergence of Catalonia (CDC) and Democratic Union of Catalonia (UDC) over the future of the alliance—which resulted in CiU being turned into a full-fledged party federation in order to ensure its continuity in the post-Pujol era—and a desire for change after 23 years in power had resulted in CiU trailing the PSC in opinion polls for the entire legislature, with a lead that was nearly into the double digits by mid-to-late 2002. From mid-2003, however, the Socialist lead had begun to narrow to the point that chances for a possible reenactment of the 1999 tight race remained high. The retirement of Pujol as CiU candidate paved the way for Artur Mas, the then chief minister (Catalan: Conseller en cap), to replace him as the culmination of a long successory process.

Republican Left of Catalonia (ERC) had been in an almost continuous growth since the 1988 election, becoming a political force able to pierce through the dominant two-party system in Catalonia. Initiative for Catalonia Greens (ICV) and United and Alternative Left (EUiA) had run separately in the previous election, but ahead of the 2003 election joined within the ICV–EA coalition.

== Overview ==
Under the 1979 Statute of Autonomy, the Parliament of Catalonia was the unicameral legislature of the homonymous autonomous community, having legislative power in devolved matters, as well as the ability to grant or withdraw confidence from a regional president. The electoral and procedural rules were supplemented by national law provisions.

=== Date ===
The term of the Parliament of Catalonia expired four years after the date of its previous election, unless it was dissolved earlier. The election was required to be called no later than 15 days before the scheduled expiration date of parliament, with election day taking place within 60 days from the call. The previous election was held on 17 October 1999, which meant that the chamber's term would have expired on 17 October 2003. The election was required to be called no later than 2 October 2003, setting the latest possible date for election day on 1 December 2003.

The regional president had the prerogative to dissolve the Parliament of Catalonia at any given time and call a snap election, provided that no motion of no confidence was in process and that dissolution did not occur before one year after a previous one under this procedure. In the event of an investiture process failing to elect a regional president within a two-month period from the first ballot, the Parliament was to be automatically dissolved and a fresh election called.

The Parliament of Catalonia was officially dissolved on 23 September 2003 with the publication of the corresponding decree in the Official Journal of the Government of Catalonia (DOGC), setting election day for 16 November.

=== Electoral system ===
Voting for the Parliament was based on universal suffrage, comprising all Spanish nationals over 18 years of age, registered in Catalonia and with full political rights, provided that they had not been deprived of the right to vote by a final sentence, nor were legally incapacitated.

The Parliament of Catalonia had a minimum of 100 and a maximum of 150 seats, with electoral provisions fixing its size at 135. All were elected in four multi-member constituencies—corresponding to the provinces of Barcelona, Girona, Lleida and Tarragona, each of which was assigned a fixed number of seats—using the D'Hondt method and closed-list proportional voting, with a three percent-threshold of valid votes (including blank ballots) in each constituency. The use of this electoral method resulted in a higher effective threshold depending on district magnitude and vote distribution.

As a result of the aforementioned allocation, each Parliament constituency was entitled the following seats:

Seats	Constituencies
85	Barcelona
18	Tarragona
17	Girona
15	Lleida

The law did not provide for by-elections to fill vacant seats; instead, any vacancies arising after the proclamation of candidates and during the legislative term were filled by the next candidates on the party lists or, when required, by designated substitutes.

=== Outgoing parliament ===
The table below shows the composition of the parliamentary groups in the chamber at the time of dissolution.

Parliamentary composition in September 2003
Groups	Parties	Legislators	
Groups	Parties	Seats	Total
Convergence and Union's Parliamentary Group	CDC	41	56
Convergence and Union's Parliamentary Group	UDC	15	56
Socialists–Citizens for Change Parliamentary Group	PSC	35	50
Socialists–Citizens for Change Parliamentary Group	CpC	15	50
People's Parliamentary Group	PP	12	12
Republican Left of Catalonia's Parliamentary Group	ERC	12	12
Initiative for Catalonia–Greens's Parliamentary Group	ICV	5	5

== Parties and candidates ==
The electoral law allowed for parties and federations registered in the interior ministry, alliances and groupings of electors to present lists of candidates. Parties and federations intending to form an alliance were required to inform the relevant electoral commission within 10 days of the election call, whereas groupings of electors needed to secure the signature of at least one percent of the electorate in the constituencies for which they sought election, disallowing electors from signing for more than one list.

Below is a list of the main parties and alliances which contested the election:

Candidacy	Parties and alliances	Leading candidate	Ideology	Previous result		Gov.	Ref.
Candidacy	Parties and alliances	Leading candidate	Ideology	Vote %	Seats	Gov.	Ref.
CiU	List: Convergence and Union (CiU) – Democratic Convergence of Catalonia (CDC) – Democratic Union of Catalonia (UDC)	Artur Mas	Catalan nationalism Centrism	37.7%	56	Yes	
PSC–CpC	List: Socialists' Party of Catalonia (PSC–PSOE); Citizens for Change (CpC)	Pasqual Maragall	Social democracy	37.9%	52	No	
PP	List: People's Party (PP)	Josep Piqué	Conservatism; Christian democracy	9.5%	12	No	
ERC	List: Republican Left of Catalonia (ERC)	Josep-Lluís Carod-Rovira	Catalan independence Left-wing nationalism Social democracy	8.7%	12	No	
ICV–EA	List: Initiative for Catalonia Greens (ICV); United and Alternative Left (EUiA) – Party of the Communists of Catalonia (PCC) – Living Unified Socialist Party of Catalonia (PSUC viu) – Revolutionary Workers' Party (POR) – Workers' Revolutionary Party–Revolutionary Left (PRT–IR)	Joan Saura	Regionalism; Eco-socialism; Green politics	3.9%	3	No	

== Campaign ==
=== Party slogans ===
Party or alliance	Original slogan	English translation	Ref.
CiU	« Sí a Catalunya »	"Yes to Catalonia"	
PSC–CpC	« El canvi per Catalunya »	"Change for Catalonia"	
PP	« Creiem en Catalunya »	"We believe in Catalonia"	
ERC	« + a prop »	"Closer"	
ICV–EUiA	« La teva força »	"Your strength"	

=== Debates ===
2003 Catalan regional election debates
Date	Organizer(s)	Moderator(s)	P Present (Note: Denotes a main invitee attending the event.) S Surrogate (Note: Denotes a main invitee not attending the event, sending a surrogate in their place.) NI Not invited I Invited A Absent invitee						
Date	Organizer(s)	Moderator(s)	CiU	PSC	PP	ERC	ICV–EUiA	Audience	Ref.
7 November	CCMA		P Mas	P Maragall	P Piqué	P Carod	P Saura		

== Opinion polls ==
The tables below list opinion polling results in reverse chronological order, showing the most recent first and using the dates when the survey fieldwork was done, as opposed to the date of publication. Where the fieldwork dates are unknown, the date of publication is given instead. The highest percentage figure in each polling survey is displayed with its background shaded in the leading party's colour. If a tie ensues, this is applied to the figures with the highest percentages. The "Lead" column on the right shows the percentage-point difference between the parties with the highest percentages in a poll.

=== Graphical summary ===
Local regression trend line of poll results from 17 October 1999 to 16 November 2003, with each line corresponding to a political party.

=== Voting intention estimates ===
The table below lists weighted voting intention estimates. Refusals are generally excluded from the party vote percentages, while question wording and the treatment of "don't know" responses and those not intending to vote may vary between polling organisations. When available, seat projections determined by the polling organisations are displayed below (or in place of) the percentages in a smaller font; 68 seats were required for an absolute majority in the Parliament of Catalonia.

Color key:

Exit poll

Polling firm/Commissioner	Fieldwork date	Sample size	Turnout	PSC	CiU	PP	ERC	ICV	EUiA	Lead
2003 regional election	16 Nov 2003	—N/a	62.5	31.2; 42	30.9; 46	11.9; 15	16.4; 23	7.3; 9	(Note: Within ICV.)	0.3
Ipsos–Eco/CCRTV (Note: Quick count.)	16 Nov 2003	73,696	?	30.9; 42	31.7; 47	11.2; 14	16.8; 24	7.2; 8		0.8
Eco Consulting/CCRTV	16 Nov 2003	?	?	32.3; 44/46	29.4; 43/45	10.3; 12/14	17.6; 24/26	7.6; 8/9		2.9
Gallup/RTVE	16 Nov 2003	?	?	35.1; 47/49	29.4; 43/45	9.6; 12	15.7; 22/23	8.0; 7/9		5.7
Sigma Dos/Antena 3	16 Nov 2003	?	?	34.3; 46/47	30.6; 45/46	11.3; 14/15	15.2; 22	6.7; 6		3.7
Celeste-Tel/La Razón	10 Nov 2003	601	?	36.3; 48/51	34.3; 48/49	10.7; 13/15	11.9; 17/18	5.3; 5/6		2.0
DEP/Dossier Econòmic	8 Nov 2003	1,200	?	34.7; 45/48	35.8; 50/54	9.7; 11/12	13.8; 18/21	4.6; 3/5		1.1
Noxa/La Vanguardia	3–6 Nov 2003	1,200	?	36.2; 49/50	33.1; 48/49	9.5; 12	13.0; 18/19	6.9; 6/7		3.1
Celeste-Tel/La Razón	5 Nov 2003	601	?	37.1; 49/50	31.5; 45/47	11.1; 14/15	13.1; 18/19	5.5; 6/7		5.6
Sigma Dos/El Mundo	3–5 Nov 2003	1,600	?	35.0; 46/49	32.2; 46/49	12.4; 15/16	12.8; 18/20	5.9; 5/6		2.8
Vox Pública/El Periódico	1–5 Nov 2003	2,025	?	36.5; 50/51	30.9; 45/47	10.0; 12/13	13.7; 19/20	6.9; 7/8		5.6
Opina/El País	31 Oct–2 Nov 2003	2,100	?	34.5; 48/50	32.5; 47/49	10.5; 13	12.5; 17/19	6.5; 7		2.0
Line Staff/CiU	31 Oct 2003	2,100	?	34.5; 47	34.0; 49/50	10.0; 12	12.5; 22/23	6.5; 7/9		0.5
Infortécnica	7–31 Oct 2003	2,012	59.0	32.1; 47/49	39.4; 50/53	7.5; 13/14	14.6; 15/18	6.5; 6/7		7.3
TNS Demoscopia/ABC	20–27 Oct 2003	2,000	?	36.1; 48/49	33.2; 49	10.5; 13	12.0; 18/19	7.5; 6		2.9
Opina/Cadena SER	26 Oct 2003	1,800	?	35.5; 49	30.0; 44/46	12.0; 16	13.0; 17/18	7.0; 7/8		5.5
CIS	13–26 Oct 2003	3,571	71.8	34.4; 47	32.4; 48	11.1; 14	12.6; 18	7.4; 8		2.0
Vox Pública/El Periódico	29 Sep–1 Oct 2003	803	?	37.0; 50/53	33.0; 45/49	8.9; 11/12	13.3; 18/19	5.7; 5		4.0
Feedback/CiU	15–24 Sep 2003	2,507	?	35.4; 47	34.0; 49	9.9; 14	13.0; 19	6.1; 6		1.4
Noxa/La Vanguardia	10–11 Sep 2003	812	?	36.4; 49/52	33.7; 46/49	7.8; 9/10	15.1; 22/23	5.9; 5		2.7
Noxa/La Vanguardia	7–10 Jul 2003	1,000	?	36.3; 49/52	33.7; 48/51	7.8; 9/10	14.5; 20/21	5.9; 5		2.6
Vox Pública/El Periódico	25–27 Jun 2003	?	?	38.8; 54/55	31.6; 44/45	9.5; 12/13	14.0; 20/21	4.2; 4		7.2
La Vanguardia	22 Jun 2003	?	61.3	35.9; 49	31.1; 47	9.5; 13	10.2; 22	4.8; 4		4.8
Vox Pública/El Periódico	31 Mar–1 Apr 2003	?	?	41.0; 56/57	32.1; 46/48	7.0; 7/8	13.4; 19/20	4.4; 4/5		8.9
Opina/ERC	5–7 Mar 2003	1,800	?	38.0; 50/51	33.0; 48/51	9.0; 11/12	14.0; 18/21	5.0; 4		5.0
Vox Pública/El Periódico	13–15 Jan 2003	?	?	40.5; 55/57	32.6; 48/50	8.3; 9/10	12.4; 17/18	4.0; 4		7.9
Noxa/La Vanguardia	7–11 Jan 2003	1,500	?	43.0; 57	34.7; 51	7.8; 10	10.7; 15	2.2; 2		8.3
CES/CiU	7–10 Jan 2003	2,500	?	37.3; 52/53	35.7; 51/52	9.8; 12	11.9; 16/17	2.4; 2	1.1; 0	1.6
Vox Pública/PSC	16–18 Dec 2002	805	?	39.5– 40.5	31.0– 32.0	8.5– 9.5	12.0– 13.0	5.0– 6.0		8.5
Vox Pública/El Periódico	7–9 Oct 2002	?	?	40.5; 55/57	32.4; 47/49	8.8; 10/12	12.4; 16/18	2.9; 3/4	1.0; 0	8.1
CIS	9 Sep–9 Oct 2002	922	72.6	33.6	35.2	9.6	11.3	6.5		1.6
Vox Pública/El Periódico	25–27 Jun 2002	?	?	40.5	33.0	8.0	12.0	3.3	1.0	7.5
Vox Pública/PSC	10–12 Jun 2002	605	?	40.0– 41.0	32.5– 33.5	7.0– 8.0	12.5– 13.5	2.5– 3.5	1.0– 2.0	7.5
Vox Pública/El Periódico	15–17 Apr 2002	800	?	40.2	34.1	8.0	10.3	3.2	1.4	6.1
Opina/CDC	11–16 Apr 2002	2,400	?	35.0	36.0	10.2	11.5	3.0	–	1.0
La Vanguardia	8 Apr 2002	?	?	40.5; 55/57	33.0; 48/50	9.5; 12/13	11.0; 15/16	2.5; 0/2	–	7.5
Vox Pública/PSC	11–14 Mar 2002	?	?	39.5– 40.5	32.5– 33.5	9.0– 10.0	10.5– 11.5	2.5– 3.5	1.0– 2.0	7.0
Vox Pública/El Periódico	4–5 Feb 2002	?	?	39.4	35.6	8.7	10.3	2.6	1.2	3.8
UDC	28 Dec 2001	1,200	?	37.3	37.2	–	–	–	–	0.1
Vox Pública/PSC	20–22 Nov 2001	602	?	38.5– 39.5	34.5– 35.5	8.5– 9.5	9.0– 10.0	2.0– 3.0	1.0– 2.0	4.0
Vox Pública/El Periódico	23–25 Oct 2001	?	?	36.8	36.1	8.4	12.3	2.8	1.4	0.7
Vox Pública/PSC	22 Oct 2001	?	?	39.0– 40.0	35.5– 36.5	7.0– 8.0	10.0– 11.0	2.0– 3.0	1.0– 2.0	3.5
La Vanguardia	13–17 Aug 2001	?	?	40.0; 54/56	32.8; 48/50	10.0; 12/13	11.0; 15/16	2.5; 2/3	–	7.2
Vox Pública/El Periódico	28–30 Jun 2001	?	?	37.2	36.8	8.3	11.0	3.3	1.5	0.4
Vox Pública/PSC	12–14 Jun 2001	600	?	38.5– 39.5	35.0– 36.0	8.0– 8.5	10.0– 11.0	2.5– 3.5	1.0– 1.5	3.5
Vox Pública/El Periódico	19–20 Apr 2001	?	?	39.2	35.2	9.5	9.6	2.6	1.0	4.0
CIS	3–26 Mar 2001	2,778	85.2	37.7; 51/52	34.6; 51/52	10.3; 13/14	10.8; 15/6	3.9; 3	1.1; 0	3.1
Vox Pública/PSC	28 Feb–2 Mar 2001	600	?	39.0– 40.0	36.5– 37.5	9.0– 9.5	7.5– 8.5	2.5– 3.5	–	2.5
Vox Pública/El Periódico	1–2 Feb 2001	804	?	37.5	36.6	9.5	10.5	2.8	0.8	0.9
Opina/La Vanguardia	6 Nov 2000	800	?	37.0; 51	36.0; 54	10.5; 14	9.5; 13	2.5; 3	–	1.0
Vox Pública/El Periódico	1–2 Nov 2000	800	?	37.6	37.7	9.0	9.5	1.6	1.4	0.1
2000 general election	12 Mar 2000	—N/a	64.0	34.1 (48)	28.8 (45)	22.8 (32)	5.6 (7)	3.5 (3)	2.2 (0)	5.3
1999 regional election	17 Oct 1999	—N/a	59.2	37.9; 52	37.7; 56	9.5; 12	8.7; 12	2.5; 3	1.4; 0	0.2

=== Voting preferences ===
The table below lists raw, unweighted voting preferences.

Polling firm/Commissioner	Fieldwork date	Sample size	PSC	CiU	PP	ERC	ICV	EUiA	Question	X mark	Lead
2003 regional election (Note: Does not include non-resident citizens.)	16 Nov 2003	—N/a	19.7	19.6	7.5	10.4	4.6		—N/a	36.6	0.1
Vox Pública/El Periódico	1–5 Nov 2003	2,025	28.0	23.4	6.3	12.7	6.0		17.7	3.2	4.6
Infortécnica	7–31 Oct 2003	2,012	15.4	18.9	3.6	7.0	3.1		41.0	10.3	3.5
CIS	13–26 Oct 2003	3,571	21.2	25.4	6.1	10.2	6.1		18.2	10.9	4.2
Vox Pública/El Periódico	29 Sep–1 Oct 2003	803	25.8	29.8	5.6	13.6	4.0		13.7	4.2	4.0
Vox Pública/El Periódico	25–27 Jun 2003	?	30.0	25.7	6.1	14.1	4.9		11.8	5.2	4.3
Vox Pública/El Periódico	31 Mar–1 Apr 2003	?	26.8	21.3	4.1	11.2	3.6		23.4	6.0	5.5
Vox Pública/El Periódico	13–15 Jan 2003	?	30.3	22.9	4.6	10.0	3.4	1.0	17.6	7.0	7.4
Vox Pública/El Periódico	7–9 Oct 2002	?	28.9	23.4	5.3	9.7	2.6	1.1	18.0	8.6	5.5
CIS	9 Sep–9 Oct 2002	922	21.8	23.9	5.4	9.0	5.1	0.7	19.6	12.5	2.1
Vox Pública/El Periódico	25–27 Jun 2002	?	31.7	23.6	4.9	9.2	3.9	0.7	15.3	8.7	8.1
Vox Pública/El Periódico	4–5 Feb 2002	?	27.3	28.8	4.2	6.2	2.9	0.5	17.9	8.8	1.5
Vox Pública/El Periódico	23–25 Oct 2001	?	20.4	28.0	5.2	9.8	2.8	0.9	18.5	10.7	7.6
Vox Pública/El Periódico	28–30 Jun 2001	?	22.4	30.2	5.1	7.5	3.2	1.4	18.1	8.5	7.8
Vox Pública/El Periódico	19–20 Apr 2001	?	28.5	23.6	6.5	6.6	2.2	0.6	21.0	7.8	4.9
CIS	3–26 Mar 2001	2,778	26.1	27.7	5.4	9.4	3.1	0.5	16.0	10.6	1.6
2000 general election	12 Mar 2000	—N/a	22.0	18.5	14.7	3.6	2.3	1.4	—N/a	36.6	3.5
1999 regional election	17 Oct 1999	—N/a	22.3	22.2	5.6	5.1	1.5	0.8	—N/a	39.4	0.1

=== Victory preferences ===
The table below lists opinion polling on the victory preferences for each party in the event of a regional election taking place.

Polling firm/Commissioner	Fieldwork date	Sample size	PSC	CiU	PP	ERC	ICV	Other/ None	Question	Lead
Noxa/La Vanguardia	3–6 Nov 2003	1,200	30.0	33.0	6.0	12.0	5.0	4.0	10.0	3.0
Opina/El País	31 Oct–2 Nov 2003	2,100	30.5	25.5	7.5	8.7	3.2	–	24.7	5.0
Opina/Cadena SER	26 Oct 2003	1,800	30.3	24.7	7.6	9.0	5.1	–	23.4	5.6
CIS	13–26 Oct 2003	3,571	25.1	29.8	7.0	11.9	6.3	0.6	19.3	4.7
Noxa/La Vanguardia	10–11 Sep 2003	812	35.0	31.0	6.0	14.0	5.0	4.0	5.0	4.0
Noxa/La Vanguardia	7–10 Jul 2003	1,000	30.0	37.0	5.0	13.0	5.0	3.0	7.0	7.0
Noxa/La Vanguardia	7–11 Jan 2003	1,500	40.0	31.0	5.0	9.0	2.0	6.0	8.0	9.0
CIS	3–26 Mar 2001	2,778	31.1	32.8	5.8	9.9	3.1	0.9	16.3	1.7

=== Victory likelihood ===
The table below lists opinion polling on the perceived likelihood of victory for each party in the event of a regional election taking place.

Polling firm/Commissioner	Fieldwork date	Sample size	PSC	CiU	PP	ERC	ICV	Other/ None	Question	Lead
Noxa/La Vanguardia	3–6 Nov 2003	1,200	33.0	45.0	4.0	1.0	–	1.0	17.0	12.0
Opina/El País	31 Oct–2 Nov 2003	2,100	31.1	34.0	1.9	0.7	0.1	–	32.3	2.9
Infortécnica	7–31 Oct 2003	2,012	20.5	33.9	2.1	–	–	1.3	42.3	13.4
Opina/Cadena SER	26 Oct 2003	1,800	32.1	36.3	4.2	0.7	0.2	–	26.5	4.2
CIS	13–26 Oct 2003	3,571	26.4	45.9	4.3	0.7	0.2	0.1	22.5	19.5
Noxa/La Vanguardia	10–11 Sep 2003	812	35.0	47.0	3.0	1.0	–	1.0	13.0	12.0
Noxa/La Vanguardia	7–10 Jul 2003	1,000	38.0	40.0	3.0	1.0	–	1.0	17.0	2.0
Noxa/La Vanguardia	7–11 Jan 2003	1,500	32.0	43.0	2.0	–	–	1.0	22.0	11.0

=== Preferred President ===
The table below lists opinion polling on leader preferences to become president of the Government of Catalonia.

All candidates

Polling firm/Commissioner	Fieldwork date	Sample size									Other/ None/ Not care	Question	Lead
Polling firm/Commissioner	Fieldwork date	Sample size	Maragall PSC	Pujol CiU	Mas CiU	Duran CiU	F. Díaz PP	Piqué PP	Carod ERC	Saura ICV–EUiA	Other/ None/ Not care	Question	Lead
Opina/El País	31 Oct–2 Nov 2003	2,100	30.9	–	24.3	–	–	7.3	8.8	2.9	7.0	18.9	6.6
CIS	13–26 Oct 2003	3,571	29.4	–	26.2	–	–	6.7	11.2	4.4	1.8	20.3	3.2
Vox Pública/PSC	12–14 Jun 2001	600	42.5– 43.5	–	28.0– 30.0	–	–	8.5– 9.0	11.0– 12.0	4.5– 5.5	2.0– 3.0	–	13.5– 14.5
CIS	3–26 Mar 2001	2,778	30.8	22.0	7.0	5.1	1.2	1.0	5.8	0.8	8.8	17.3	8.8
Vox Pública/PSC	28 Feb–2 Mar 2001	600	45.0– 46.0	–	24.5– 25.5	–	–	10.5– 11.5	9.5– 10.5	5.5– 6.5	2.0– 3.0	–	20.5

Maragall vs. Mas

Polling firm/Commissioner	Fieldwork date	Sample size			Other/ None/ Not care	Question	Lead
Polling firm/Commissioner	Fieldwork date	Sample size	Maragall PSC	Mas CiU	Other/ None/ Not care	Question	Lead
Noxa/La Vanguardia	3–6 Nov 2003	1,200	41.0	40.0	10.0	9.0	1.0
Opina/El País	31 Oct–2 Nov 2003	2,100	39.5	34.2	11.3	15.0	5.3
Noxa/La Vanguardia	10–11 Sep 2003	812	45.0	38.0	12.0	5.0	7.0
Noxa/La Vanguardia	7–10 Jul 2003	1,000	43.0	40.0	11.0	6.0	3.0
Noxa/La Vanguardia	7–11 Jan 2003	1,500	50.0	31.0	13.0	6.0	19.0
Vox Pública/PSC	12–14 Jun 2001	600	60.3	26.4	13.3		33.9
Vox Pública/PSC	28 Feb–2 Mar 2001	600	60.4	21.1	18.5		39.3
Opina/La Vanguardia	6 Nov 2000	800	40.3	24.0	5.6	30.1	16.3
Vox Pública/El Periódico	1–2 Nov 2000	800	54.6	22.6	22.8		32.0

Maragall vs. Pujol

Polling firm/Commissioner	Fieldwork date	Sample size			Other/ None/ Not care	Question	Lead
Polling firm/Commissioner	Fieldwork date	Sample size	Maragall PSC	Pujol CiU	Other/ None/ Not care	Question	Lead
Opina/La Vanguardia	6 Nov 2000	800	37.3	32.1	7.0	23.6	5.2
Vox Pública/El Periódico	1–2 Nov 2000	800	40.8	40.1	19.1		0.7

Maragall vs. Duran i Lleida

Polling firm/Commissioner	Fieldwork date	Sample size			Other/ None/ Not care	Question	Lead
Polling firm/Commissioner	Fieldwork date	Sample size	Maragall PSC	Duran CiU	Other/ None/ Not care	Question	Lead
Opina/La Vanguardia	6 Nov 2000	800	37.7	26.1	5.5	30.7	11.6
Vox Pública/El Periódico	1–2 Nov 2000	800	51.4	28.2	20.4		23.2

Maragall vs. Mas vs. Piqué

Polling firm/Commissioner	Fieldwork date	Sample size				Other/ None/ Not care	Question	Lead
Polling firm/Commissioner	Fieldwork date	Sample size	Maragall PSC	Mas CiU	Piqué PP	Other/ None/ Not care	Question	Lead
Opina/La Vanguardia	6 Nov 2000	800	36.7	21.7	8.3	3.7	29.6	15.0

Maragall vs. Pujol vs. Piqué

Polling firm/Commissioner	Fieldwork date	Sample size				Other/ None/ Not care	Question	Lead
Polling firm/Commissioner	Fieldwork date	Sample size	Maragall PSC	Pujol CiU	Piqué PP	Other/ None/ Not care	Question	Lead
Opina/La Vanguardia	6 Nov 2000	800	34.0	28.0	7.8	4.0	26.2	6.0

Maragall vs. Duran i Lleida vs. Piqué

Polling firm/Commissioner	Fieldwork date	Sample size				Other/ None/ Not care	Question	Lead
Polling firm/Commissioner	Fieldwork date	Sample size	Maragall PSC	Duran CiU	Piqué PP	Other/ None/ Not care	Question	Lead
Opina/La Vanguardia	6 Nov 2000	800	35.3	21.4	8.1	4.0	31.2	13.9

=== Predicted President ===
The table below lists opinion polling on the perceived likelihood for each leader to become president.

All candidates

Polling firm/Commissioner	Fieldwork date	Sample size						Other/ None/ Not care	Question	Lead
Polling firm/Commissioner	Fieldwork date	Sample size	Maragall PSC	Mas CiU	Piqué PP	Carod ERC	Saura ICV–EUiA	Other/ None/ Not care	Question	Lead
Opina/El País	31 Oct–2 Nov 2003	2,100	32.8	32.7	2.2	0.6	0.1	1.7	30.0	0.1

Maragall vs. Mas

Polling firm/Commissioner	Fieldwork date	Sample size			Other/ None/ Not care	Question	Lead
Polling firm/Commissioner	Fieldwork date	Sample size	Maragall PSC	Mas CiU	Other/ None/ Not care	Question	Lead
Noxa/La Vanguardia	3–6 Nov 2003	1,200	43.0	44.0	1.0	12.0	1.0
Opina/El País	31 Oct–2 Nov 2003	2,100	35.1	37.3	3.3	24.3	2.2
Noxa/La Vanguardia	10–11 Sep 2003	812	46.0	48.0	1.0	5.0	2.0
Noxa/La Vanguardia	7–10 Jul 2003	1,000	50.0	41.0	1.0	8.0	9.0
Noxa/La Vanguardia	7–11 Jan 2003	1,500	49.0	40.0	3.0	8.0	9.0
Vox Pública/PSC	12–14 Jun 2001	600	53.0	27.9	19.1		25.1
Opina/La Vanguardia	6 Nov 2000	800	39.3	21.3	3.3	36.1	18.0

Maragall vs. Pujol

Polling firm/Commissioner	Fieldwork date	Sample size			Other/ None/ Not care	Question	Lead
Polling firm/Commissioner	Fieldwork date	Sample size	Maragall PSC	Pujol CiU	Other/ None/ Not care	Question	Lead
Opina/La Vanguardia	6 Nov 2000	800	27.4	42.5	4.0	26.1	15.1

Maragall vs. Duran i Lleida

Polling firm/Commissioner	Fieldwork date	Sample size			Other/ None/ Not care	Question	Lead
Polling firm/Commissioner	Fieldwork date	Sample size	Maragall PSC	Duran CiU	Other/ None/ Not care	Question	Lead
Opina/La Vanguardia	6 Nov 2000	800	34.9	26.0	2.7	36.4	8.9

Maragall vs. Mas vs. Piqué

Polling firm/Commissioner	Fieldwork date	Sample size				Other/ None/ Not care	Question	Lead
Polling firm/Commissioner	Fieldwork date	Sample size	Maragall PSC	Mas CiU	Piqué PP	Other/ None/ Not care	Question	Lead
Opina/La Vanguardia	6 Nov 2000	800	32.4	20.1	9.8	2.4	35.3	12.3

Maragall vs. Pujol vs. Piqué

Polling firm/Commissioner	Fieldwork date	Sample size				Other/ None/ Not care	Question	Lead
Polling firm/Commissioner	Fieldwork date	Sample size	Maragall PSC	Pujol CiU	Piqué PP	Other/ None/ Not care	Question	Lead
Opina/La Vanguardia	6 Nov 2000	800	24.9	35.4	6.1	2.3	31.3	10.5

Maragall vs. Duran i Lleida vs. Piqué

Polling firm/Commissioner	Fieldwork date	Sample size				Other/ None/ Not care	Question	Lead
Polling firm/Commissioner	Fieldwork date	Sample size	Maragall PSC	Duran CiU	Piqué PP	Other/ None/ Not care	Question	Lead
Opina/La Vanguardia	6 Nov 2000	800	32.3	20.9	8.0	2.5	36.3	11.4

== Voter turnout ==
The table below shows registered voter turnout during the election. Figures for election day do not include non-resident citizens, while final figures do.

Province	Time (Election day)									Final		
Province	13:00			18:00			20:00			Final		
Province	1999	2003	+/–	1999	2003	+/–	1999	2003	+/–	1999	2003	+/–
Barcelona	24.13%	26.00%	+1.87	46.10%	50.79%	+4.69	59.52%	62.94%	+3.42	58.85%	62.10%	+3.25
Girona	26.70%	29.23%	+2.53	50.32%	54.76%	+4.44	62.75%	65.95%	+3.20	62.16%	65.27%	+3.11
Lleida	22.59%	25.45%	+2.86	46.95%	52.78%	+5.83	62.12%	66.97%	+4.85	60.81%	65.47%	+4.66
Tarragona	23.59%	26.21%	+2.62	44.87%	49.92%	+5.05	58.91%	62.33%	+3.42	58.32%	61.67%	+3.35
Total	24.21%	26.27%	+2.06	46.40%	51.17%	+4.77	59.90%	63.38%	+3.48	59.20%	62.54%	+3.34

== Results ==
=== Overall ===
← Summary of the 16 November 2003 Parliament of Catalonia election results →
Parties and alliances	Popular vote			Seats	
Parties and alliances	Votes	%	±pp	Total	+/−
Socialists' Party of Catalonia–Citizens for Change (PSC–CpC)	1,031,454	31.16	−6.69	42	−10
Convergence and Union (CiU)	1,024,425	30.94	−6.76	46	−10
Republican Left of Catalonia (ERC)	544,324	16.44	+7.77	23	+11
People's Party (PP)	393,499	11.89	+2.38	15	+3
Initiative for Catalonia Greens–Alternative Left (ICV–EA)^{1}	241,163	7.28	+3.35	9	+6
The Greens–The Ecologist Alternative (EV–AE)	18,470	0.56	New	0	±0
Platform for Catalonia (PxC)	4,892	0.15	New	0	±0
Internationalist Socialist Workers' Party (POSI)	4,226	0.13	+0.04	0	±0
Communist Party of the Catalan People (PCPC)	2,580	0.08	New	0	±0
Unsubmissive Seats (Ei)	2,220	0.07	New	0	±0
Catalan State (EC)	1,890	0.06	±0.00	0	±0
The Greens–Green Alternative (EV–AV)	1,886	0.06	−0.20	0	±0
Republican Left–Left Republican Party (IR–PRE)	1,714	0.05	New	0	±0
Humanist Party of Catalonia (PHC)	1,647	0.05	+0.01	0	±0
Another Democracy is Possible (UADeP)	1,386	0.04	New	0	±0
Democratic and Social Centre (CDS)	1,073	0.03	−0.01	0	±0
Caló Nationalist Party (PNCA)	812	0.02	New	0	±0
Republican Social Movement (MSR)	804	0.02	New	0	±0
Internationalist Struggle (LI (LIT–CI))	802	0.02	±0.00	0	±0
Spaniards Under Separatism (EBS)	603	0.02	New	0	±0
Citizens for Blank Votes (CenB)	401	0.01	New	0	±0
Blank ballots	30,212	0.91	−0.02		
Total	3,310,483			135	±0
Valid votes	3,310,483	99.74	−0.01		
Invalid votes	8,793	0.26	+0.01		
Votes cast / turnout	3,319,276	62.54	+3.34		
Abstentions	1,988,561	37.46	−3.34		
Registered voters	5,307,837				
Sources
Footnotes: ^{1} Initiative for Catalonia Greens–Alternative Left results are compared to the combined totals of Initiative for Catalonia–Greens and United and Alternative Left in the 1999 election.

Popular vote
PSC–CpC	31.16%
CiU	30.94%
ERC	16.44%
PP	11.89%
ICV–EA	7.28%
Others	1.37%
Blank ballots	0.91%

Seats
CiU	34.07%
PSC–CpC	31.11%
ERC	17.04%
PP	11.11%
ICV–EA	6.67%

=== Distribution by constituency ===
Constituency	PSC–CpC		CiU		ERC		PP		ICV–EA	
Constituency	%	S	%	S	%	S	%	S	%	S
Barcelona	33.2	29	28.8	25	15.2	13	12.6	11	8.0	7
Girona	23.7	4	38.7	7	21.9	4	8.1	1	5.3	1
Lleida	22.5	4	41.4	7	19.9	3	9.7	1	4.4	–
Tarragona	28.2	5	33.8	7	19.0	3	11.8	2	5.2	1
Total	31.2	42	30.9	46	16.4	23	11.9	15	7.3	9

== Aftermath ==
=== Government formation ===
Investiture; Nomination of Pasqual Maragall (PSC)
Ballot →	16 December 2003
Required majority →	68 out of 135
Yes: • PSC–CpC (42); • ERC (23); • ICV–EA (9)	74 / 135
No: • CiU (46); • PP (15)	61 / 135
Abstentions	0 / 135
Absentees	0 / 135

== Bibliography ==
Legislation

- Ley Orgánica 4/1979, de 18 de diciembre, de Estatuto de Autonomía de Cataluña (Organic Law 4/1979). Official State Gazette (in Spanish). 18 December 1979. BOE-A-1979-30178.
- Ley 3/1982, de 23 de marzo, del Parlamento, del Presidente y del Consejo Ejecutivo de la Generalidad (Law 3/1982). Official State Gazette (in Spanish). 23 March 1982. BOE-A-1982-10330.
- Ley 8/1985, de 24 de mayo, de modificación de la Ley 3/1982, de 23 de marzo, del Parlamento, del Presidente y del Consejo Ejecutivo de la Generalidad de Cataluña (Law 8/1985). Official State Gazette (in Spanish). 24 May 1985. BOE-A-1985-16307.
- Ley Orgánica 5/1985, de 19 de junio, del Régimen Electoral General (Organic Law 5/1985). Official State Gazette (in Spanish). 19 June 1985 [version as of 11 March 2003]. BOE-A-1985-11672.
- Decreto 208/2003, de 22 de septiembre, de convocatoria de elecciones al Parlamento de Cataluña y de su disolución (PDF) (Decree 208/2003). Official Journal of the Government of Catalonia (in Spanish). 22 September 2003.

Other

- Matas Dalmases, Jordi; Reniu Vilamala, Josep Maria (2003). "La política de las coaliciones en Cataluña" (PDF). Revista Española de Ciencia Política (in Spanish) (9): 83–112. Archived from the original (PDF) on 28 September 2015.
