= Joana Ortega =

Spanish politician

The Honourable Joana Ortega
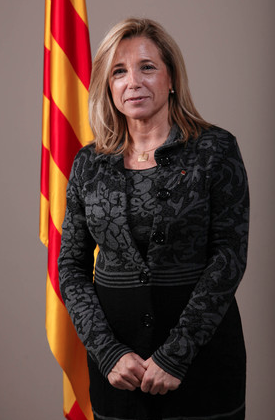

Vice President of Catalonia
- In office 29 December 2010 – 22 June 2015
- President: Artur Mas
- Preceded by: Josep-Lluís Carod-Rovira
- Succeeded by: Neus Munté i Fernández

Counsellor of Governance and Institutional Relations
- In office 29 December 2010 – 22 June 2015
- President: Artur Mas
- Preceded by: Jordi Ausàs
- Succeeded by: Meritxell Borràs i Solé

Member of the Barcelona City Council
- Incumbent
- Assumed office 28 May 2023

Personal details
- Born: 13 November 1959 (age 66) Barcelona, Catalonia, Spain
- Party: Democratic Union of Catalonia
- Other political affiliations: Convergence and Union
- Education: Abat Oliba CEU University

Joana Ortega i Alemany (born 13 November 1959 in Barcelona) was the vice president of the government of the Generalitat de Catalunya and Counsellor of Government and Institutional Relations from 2010 until 2015. She has also been a deputy at the Parliament of Catalonia from 2006 to 2015. She was the first woman who has occupied the seat of vice president.

She has a degree in psychology from Barcelona's Abat Oliba CEU University (UAO CEU)

Since 2006, Ortega has been a member of Parliament, being elected chairwoman of the Committee on the Catalan Corporation for Audiovisual Media (CCMA), the government-owned radio and TV holding. From 2002 to 2003 she headed the Catalan Institute for Women, the Catalan government's agency promoting gender equality, and the Catalan National Women Council, its civil society outreach branch. Since 2010, she has served as deputy prime minister and minister for government affairs and institutional relations.

In local politics, Ortega was a member of Barcelona City Council from 1996 to 2007. During that period, she was executive council member for the Eixample district (the area built in the 19th century, which includes among others Gaudi's Sagrada Familia) and vice president of Proeixample, a local council-owned company devoted to urban renewal. She also served as fourth vice president of the Barcelona County Council and ruling coalition CiU's spokesperson at Barcelona Local Councils Federation and at the Barcelona Connurbation Council.

Ortega appeared in court in Barcelona on 13 October 2015, to face criminal charges of having assisted in the organisation of the 2014 Catalan self-determination referendum, which the Spanish courts deem illegal. Fellow ministers Artur Mas and Irene Rigau also face charges. Large public protests took place in Barcelona the same day in support of the accused.

In March 2017, the High Court of Justice of Catalonia condemned Artur Mas, Joana Ortega and Irene Rigau to fines and were barred from office between 18 and 24 months. Although they were acquitted of charges of misappropriation of public funds, The Court of Auditors has also been judging them as accounting officers for the referendum preparations and claims 5,2 million euros.

Political offices
Preceded by Josep-Lluís Carod-Rovira	Vice President of Catalonia; 2010–2015	Succeeded by Neus Munté i Fernández
Political offices
Preceded by Jordi Ausàs	Counsellor of Governance and Institutional Relations; 2010–2015	Succeeded by Meritxell Borràs i Solé
