= 2006 Catalan regional election =

Election in the Spanish region of Catalonia

- 1 November 2006

All 135 seats in the Parliament of Catalonia 68 seats needed for a majority
- Opinion polls
- Registered: 5,321,274 ▲0.3%
- Turnout: 2,982,108 (56.0%) ▼6.5 pp
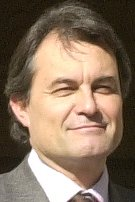

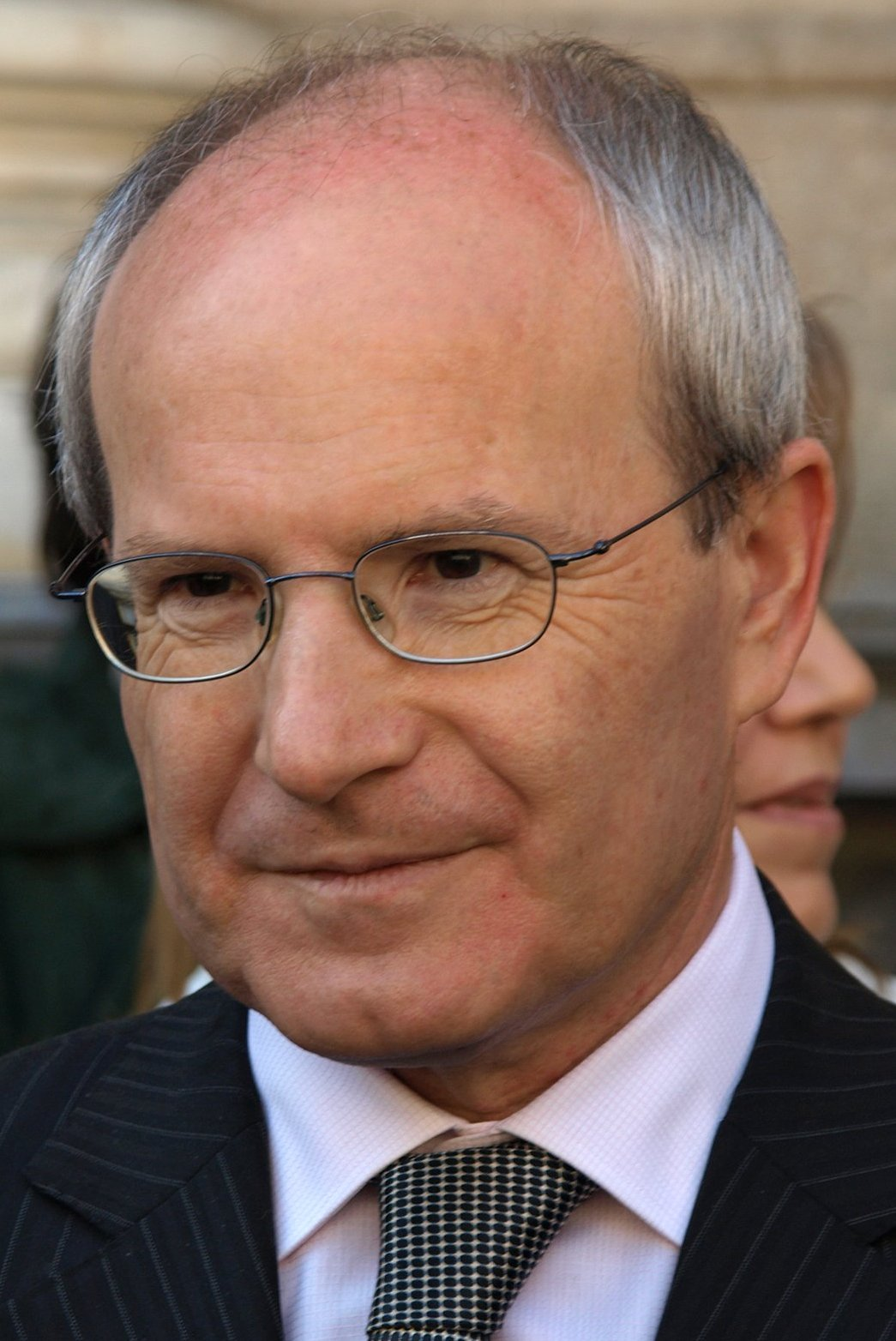

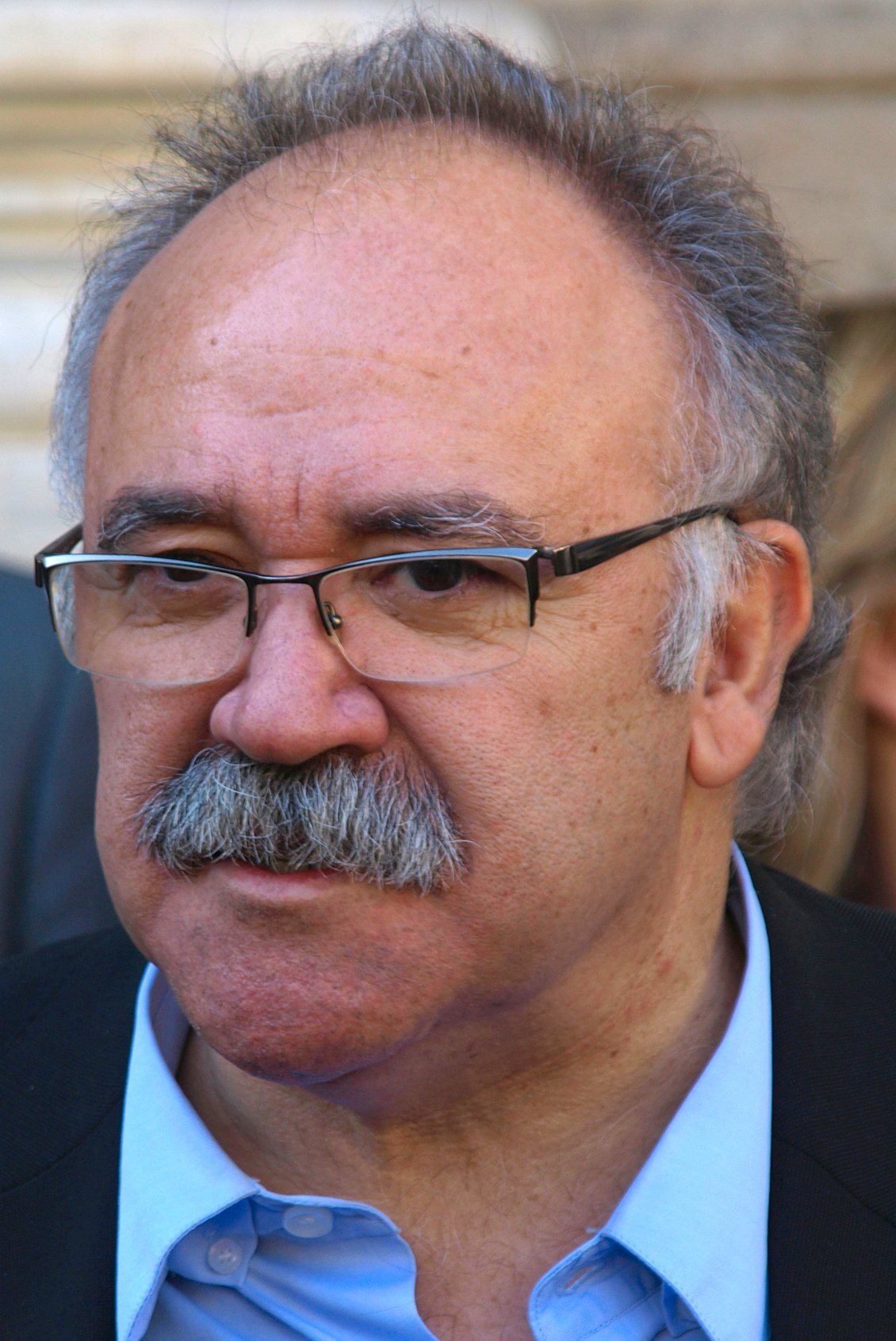

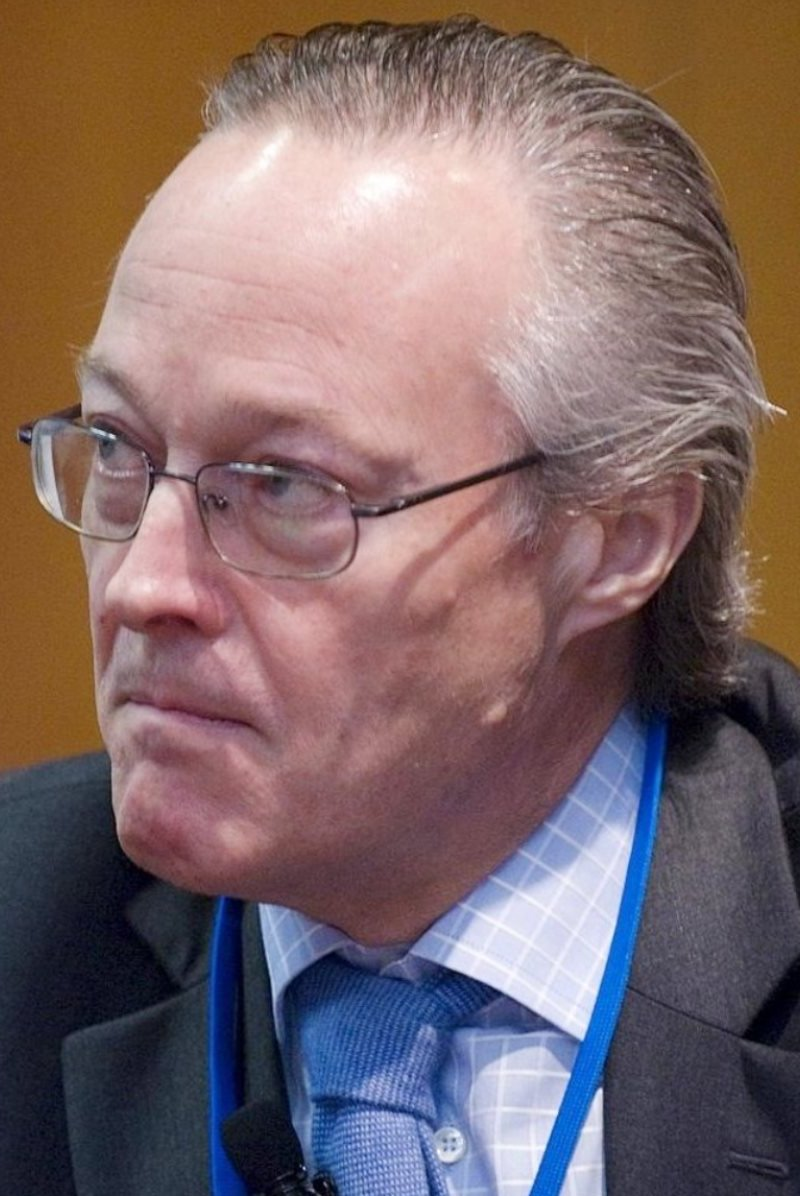

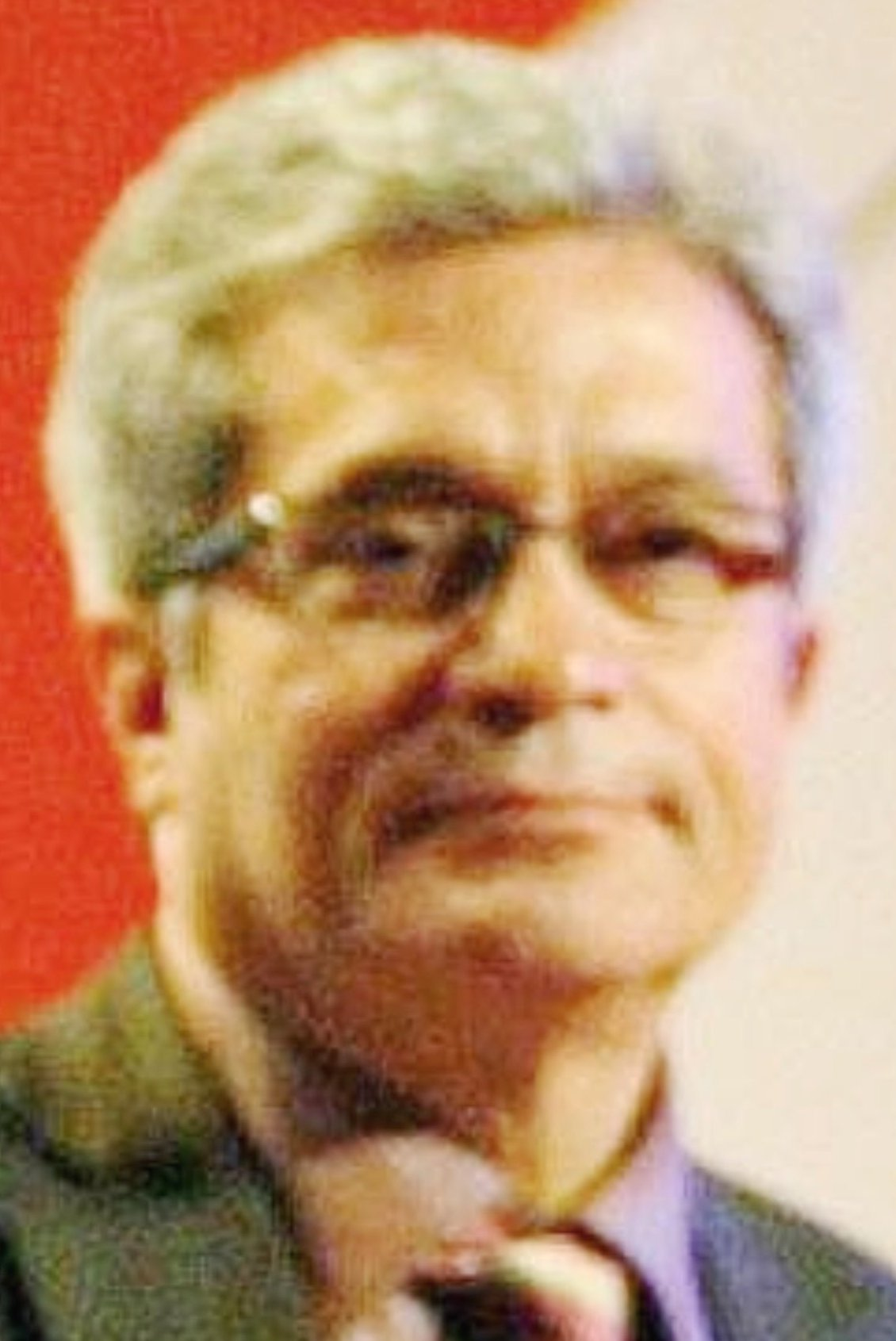

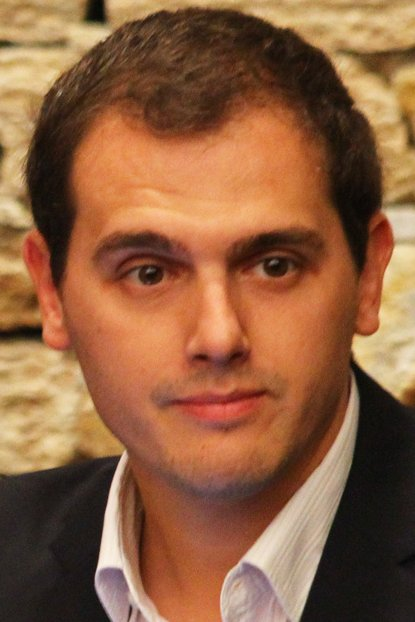
	First party	Second party	Third party
Leader	Artur Mas	José Montilla	Josep-Lluís Carod-Rovira
Party	CiU	PSC–CpC	ERC
Leader since	7 January 2002	15 July 2006	25 November 1996
Leader's seat	Barcelona	Barcelona	Barcelona
Last election	46 seats, 30.9%	42 seats, 31.2%	23 seats, 16.4%
Seats won	48	37	21
Seat change	▲2	▼5	▼2
Popular vote	935,756	796,173	416,355
Percentage	31.5%	26.8%	14.0%
Swing	▲0.6 pp	▼4.4 pp	▼2.4 pp
	Fourth party	Fifth party	Sixth party
Leader	Josep Piqué	Joan Saura	Albert Rivera
Party	PP	ICV–EUiA	C's
Leader since	4 September 2003	26 November 2000	9 July 2006
Leader's seat	Barcelona	Barcelona	Barcelona
Last election	15 seats, 11.9%	9 seats, 7.3%	Did not contest
Seats won	14	12	3
Seat change	▼1	▲3	▲3
Popular vote	316,222	282,693	89,840
Percentage	10.7%	9.5%	3.0%
Swing	▼1.2 pp	▲2.2 pp	New party
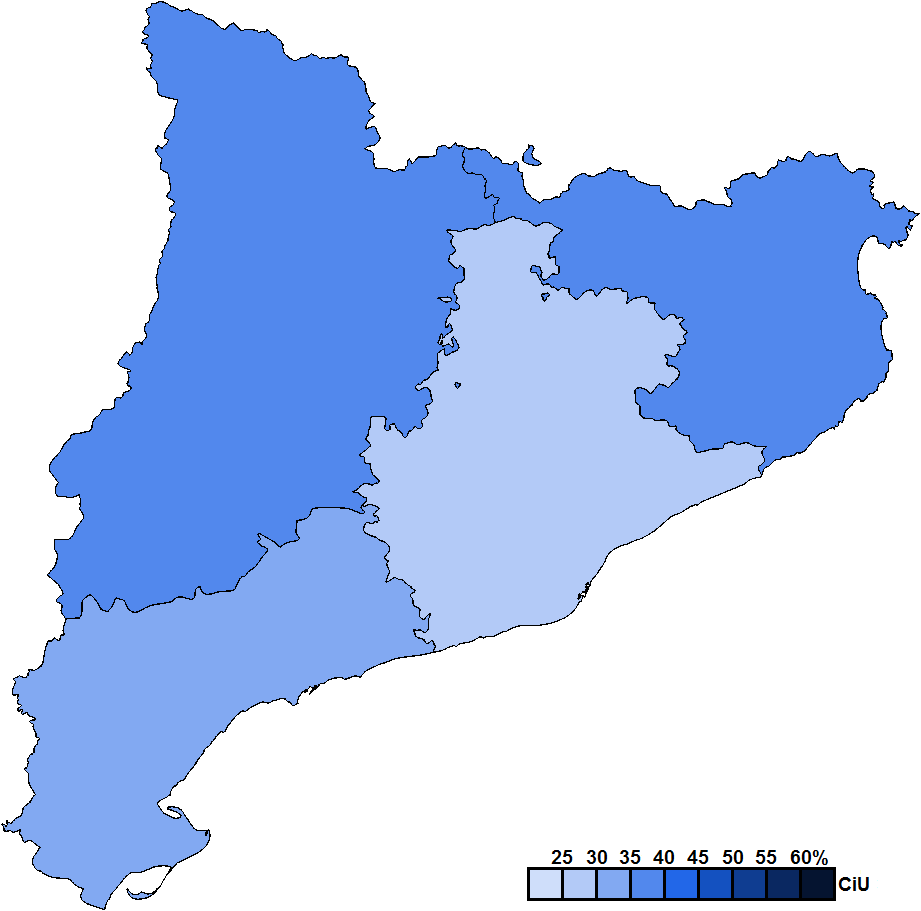
President before election
Pasqual Maragall
PSC
President after election
José Montilla
PSC

A regional election was held in Catalonia on 1 November 2006 to elect the 8th Parliament of the autonomous community. All 135 seats in the Parliament were up for election. Unlike other occasions, the election was held on a public holiday during the workweek, All Saints' Day.

The Socialists' Party of Catalonia (PSC), Republican Left of Catalonia (ERC) and Initiative for Catalonia Greens–United and Alternative Left (ICV–EUiA) had formed a coalition government in 2003 under Pasqual Maragall as Catalan president, in the first left-from-centre cabinet in Catalonia since the Spanish transition to democracy, colloquially dubbed as the "three-party" or "tripartite" alliance (Catalan: tripartit). Maragall oversaw the drafting of a new statute of autonomy for Catalonia, which aimed at further expanding the authority of the regional institutions, but negotiations between the national government of the Spanish Socialist Workers' Party (PSOE)—the PSC's sister party—and the Catalan nationalist Convergence and Union (CiU) and ERC were uneasy. ERC left the coalition in May 2006 over disagreements on the final statutory draft approved by the Spanish parliament, thus leaving Maragall in minority. Following the statute being ratified in a referendum on 18 June 2006, Maragall announced a snap election for 1 November and his decision not to run for a second term in office.

The election saw the first undisputed win for Artur Mas's CiU since 1995, which in 1999 and 2003 had narrowly lost the popular vote to the PSC. However, the left-wing bloc formed by the latter—running under the former industry minister of Spain, José Montilla—together with ERC and ICV–EUiA, was able to secure a reduced but still working majority. The People's Party (PP) under Josep Piqué held its ground with a similar result as previous, but remained irrelevant in the government formation process. Citizens–Party of the Citizenry (C's), a new party formed under young lawyer Albert Rivera in opposition to Catalan nationalism and statutory reform, gained parliamentary representation by being able to clear the electoral threshold in the constituency of Barcelona.

== Overview ==
Under the 2006 Statute of Autonomy, the Parliament of Catalonia was the unicameral legislature of the homonymous autonomous community, having legislative power in devolved matters, as well as the ability to grant or withdraw confidence from a regional president. The electoral and procedural rules were supplemented by national law provisions.

=== Date ===
The term of the Parliament of Catalonia expired four years after the date of its previous election, unless it was dissolved earlier. The election was required to be called no later than 15 days before the scheduled expiration date of parliament, with election day taking place between 40 and 60 days from the call. The previous election was held on 16 November 2003, which meant that the chamber's term would have expired on 16 November 2007. The election was required to be called no later than 1 November 2007, setting the latest possible date for election day on 31 December 2007.

The regional president had the prerogative to dissolve the Parliament of Catalonia at any given time and call a snap election, provided that no motion of no confidence was in process and that dissolution did not occur before one year after a previous one under this procedure. In the event of an investiture process failing to elect a regional president within a two-month period from the first ballot, the Parliament was to be automatically dissolved and a fresh election called.

The Parliament of Catalonia was officially dissolved on 8 September 2006 with the publication of the corresponding decree in the Official Journal of the Government of Catalonia (DOGC), setting election day for 1 November.

=== Electoral system ===
Voting for the Parliament was based on universal suffrage, comprising all Spanish nationals over 18 years of age, registered in Catalonia and with full political rights, provided that they had not been deprived of the right to vote by a final sentence, nor were legally incapacitated.

The Parliament of Catalonia had a minimum of 100 and a maximum of 150 seats, with electoral provisions fixing its size at 135. All were elected in four multi-member constituencies—corresponding to the provinces of Barcelona, Girona, Lleida and Tarragona, each of which was assigned a fixed number of seats—using the D'Hondt method and closed-list proportional voting, with a three percent-threshold of valid votes (including blank ballots) in each constituency. The use of this electoral method resulted in a higher effective threshold depending on district magnitude and vote distribution.

As a result of the aforementioned allocation, each Parliament constituency was entitled the following seats:

Seats	Constituencies
85	Barcelona
18	Tarragona
17	Girona
15	Lleida

The law did not provide for by-elections to fill vacant seats; instead, any vacancies arising after the proclamation of candidates and during the legislative term were filled by the next candidates on the party lists or, when required, by designated substitutes.

=== Outgoing parliament ===
The table below shows the composition of the parliamentary groups in the chamber at the time of dissolution.

Parliamentary composition in September 2006
Groups	Parties	Legislators	
Groups	Parties	Seats	Total
Convergence and Union's Parliamentary Group	CDC	33	46
Convergence and Union's Parliamentary Group	UDC	13	46
Socialists–Citizens for Change Parliamentary Group	PSC	32	42
Socialists–Citizens for Change Parliamentary Group	CpC	10	42
Republican Left of Catalonia's Parliamentary Group	ERC	23	23
People's Party of Catalonia's Parliamentary Group	PP	15	15
Initiative for Catalonia Greens–Alternative Left's; Parliamentary Group	ICV	8	9
Initiative for Catalonia Greens–Alternative Left's; Parliamentary Group	EUiA	1	9

== Parties and candidates ==
The electoral law allowed for parties and federations registered in the interior ministry, alliances and groupings of electors to present lists of candidates. Parties and federations intending to form an alliance were required to inform the relevant electoral commission within 10 days of the election call, whereas groupings of electors needed to secure the signature of at least one percent of the electorate in the constituencies for which they sought election, disallowing electors from signing for more than one list.

Below is a list of the main parties and alliances which contested the election:

Candidacy	Parties and alliances	Leading candidate	Ideology	Previous result		Gov.	Ref.
Candidacy	Parties and alliances	Leading candidate	Ideology	Vote %	Seats	Gov.	Ref.
CiU	List: Convergence and Union (CiU) – Democratic Convergence of Catalonia (CDC) – Democratic Union of Catalonia (UDC)	Artur Mas	Catalan nationalism Centrism	30.9%	46	No	
PSC–CpC	List: Socialists' Party of Catalonia (PSC–PSOE); Citizens for Change (CpC)	José Montilla	Social democracy	31.2%	42	Yes	
ERC	List: Republican Left of Catalonia (ERC)	Josep-Lluís Carod-Rovira	Catalan independence Left-wing nationalism Social democracy	16.4%	23	No	
PP	List: People's Party (PP)	Josep Piqué	Conservatism; Christian democracy	11.9%	15	No	
ICV–EUiA	List: Initiative for Catalonia Greens (ICV); United and Alternative Left (EUiA) – Party of the Communists of Catalonia (PCC) – Living Unified Socialist Party of Catalonia (PSUC viu) – Revolutionary Workers' Party (POR)	Joan Saura	Regionalism; Eco-socialism; Green politics	7.3%	9	Yes	
C's	List: Citizens–Party of the Citizenry (C's)	Albert Rivera	Social liberalism	Did not contest		No	

== Opinion polls ==
The tables below list opinion polling results in reverse chronological order, showing the most recent first and using the dates when the survey fieldwork was done, as opposed to the date of publication. Where the fieldwork dates are unknown, the date of publication is given instead. The highest percentage figure in each polling survey is displayed with its background shaded in the leading party's colour. If a tie ensues, this is applied to the figures with the highest percentages. The "Lead" column on the right shows the percentage-point difference between the parties with the highest percentages in a poll.

=== Graphical summary ===
Local regression trend line of poll results from 16 November 2003 to 1 November 2006, with each line corresponding to a political party.

=== Voting intention estimates ===
The table below lists weighted voting intention estimates. Refusals are generally excluded from the party vote percentages, while question wording and the treatment of "don't know" responses and those not intending to vote may vary between polling organisations. When available, seat projections determined by the polling organisations are displayed below (or in place of) the percentages in a smaller font; 68 seats were required for an absolute majority in the Parliament of Catalonia.

Color key:

Exit poll

Polling firm/Commissioner	Fieldwork date	Sample size	Turnout	PSC	CiU	ERC	PP	ICV–EUiA	C's	Lead
2006 regional election	1 Nov 2006	—N/a	56.0	26.8; 37	31.5; 48	14.0; 21	10.7; 14	9.5; 12	3.0; 3	4.7
Ipsos–Eco/CCRTV	1 Nov 2006	30,000	57.7	26.7; 37/40	31.5; 45/48	15.2; 21/24	10.0; 13/15	9.0; 10/12	2.7; 0/2	4.8
CiU	1 Nov 2006	?	?	? 37/39	? 46/48	? 23/24	? 11/12	? 12/13	? 0/3	?
TNS Demoscopia/ADN	25 Oct 2006	?	?	? 39/40	? 48/49	? 20/21	? 14/15	? 12	–	?
Opina/Cadena SER	23–24 Oct 2006	1,200	?	30.0; 42/43	30.5; 43/47	13.0; 19/22	10.0; 13/14	10.0; 13/14	–	0.5
Noxa/La Vanguardia	19–23 Oct 2006	1,000	?	28.4; 38/40	34.0; 50/52	12.5; 17/19	10.2; 13	10.9; 13/15	–	5.6
Infortécnica	22 Oct 2006	2,000	?	? 39/40	? 56/58	? 16/17	? 13/14	? 8/10	–	?
Opina/El País	22 Oct 2006	1,500	?	30.0; 42/43	30.0; 45	13.0; 20	10.5; 14	10.5; 13/14	–	Tie
GESOP/El Periódico	19–21 Oct 2006	1,000	?	29.0; 39/41	32.0; 47/49	13.2; 19/20	11.3; 14/15	10.5; 12/13	–	3.0
Feedback/RAC 1	18–20 Oct 2006	1,000	52.7	25.9; 35/37	35.5; 52/54	14.9; 20/21	11.9; 14/15	9.8; 10/13	–	9.6
Iberconsulta/La Razón	17–19 Oct 2006	1,200	61.6	29.9; 40/41	33.5; 47/49	14.8; 20/22	12.1; 14/15	8.4; 10/11	–	5.6
Opina/Cadena SER	16 Oct 2006	1,000	?	31.5; 43	29.3; 43	15.5; 23/24	10.7; 13/14	9.0; 12	–	2.2
DEP/Actual	5–16 Oct 2006	1,237	?	29.3; 38/39	31.8; 49/50	14.6; 20/21	12.1; 15	8.7; 10/11	–	2.5
CIS	2–15 Oct 2006	1,986	?	27.8; 39	33.7; 50/52	14.8; 21	10.2; 13/14	8.9; 10/11	–	5.9
Feedback/RAC 1	10–13 Oct 2006	1,000	54.4	27.4; 37	35.9; 53/54	15.0; 20	10.1; 13/14	9.1; 11	–	8.5
Celeste-Tel/Terra	10 Oct 2006	?	61.9	30.5; 41/42	34.0; 47/49	13.8; 19/20	11.6; 15	8.1; 11	–	3.5
Sigma Dos/El Mundo	6–9 Oct 2006	800	?	30.5; 42/43	32.8; 49/52	13.7; 19/21	11.0; 14/15	6.9; 8	2.3; 0	2.3
Noxa/La Vanguardia	5–9 Oct 2006	1,000	?	29.0; 38/40	35.5; 52/54	12.1; 16/18	10.5; 13	10.4; 12/13	–	6.5
GESOP/El Periódico	5–7 Oct 2006	1,000	?	29.9; 40/41	34.9; 52/53	12.4; 18/19	10.1; 12/13	9.1; 10/11	–	5.0
Feedback/RAC 1	3–6 Oct 2006	1,000	55.7	27.0; 37	35.4; 52	15.0; 20/21	10.4; 13/14	9.5; 12/13	–	8.4
TNS Demoscopia/Antena 3	2–3 Oct 2006	1,200	59.2	29.1; 40/41	32.1; 47/48	14.9; 20/22	11.6; 14/15	8.8; 10/12	–	3.0
Feedback/RAC 1	2 Oct 2006	?	?	27.8; 38	35.9; 52	14.7; 20	9.6; 12	9.6; 13	–	8.1
Feedback/RAC 1	20–22 Sep 2006	1,000	53.9	27.7; 37	36.4; 53	14.6; 20	9.5; 12	9.6; 13	–	8.7
Noxa/La Vanguardia	18–21 Sep 2006	1,000	?	29.3; 40	33.4; 50/51	13.8; 19/20	10.4; 13	9.5; 12	–	4.1
GESOP/El Periódico	14–16 Sep 2006	800	?	29.5; 40/41	34.5; 51/52	13.3; 19/20	10.5; 13/14	9.0; 10/11	–	5.0
Feedback/RAC 1	12–15 Sep 2006	1,000	54.1	27.6; 37	36.6; 53	14.8; 21	9.3; 12	9.5; 12	–	9.0
Feedback/RAC 1	13 Sep 2006	?	?	27.7; 37	36.4; 52	14.8; 21	9.2; 12	9.6; 13	–	8.7
Noxa/La Vanguardia	17–19 Jul 2006	800	?	32.4; 44	34.2; 51	12.3; 17	10.2; 13	8.3; 10	–	1.8
Opina/El País	7–8 Jun 2006	1,000	?	33.5; 46	30.5; 45	15.0; 22	10.5; 12	7.5; 10	–	3.0
GESOP/El Periódico	6–7 Jun 2006	600	?	31.0	35.0	13.0	10.5	7.0	–	4.0
Opina/Cadena SER	30 May 2006	1,000	?	33.8; 48	31.2; 46	13.1; 20	9.8; 12	8.9; 9	–	2.6
GESOP/El Periódico	15–16 May 2006	600	?	32.0	32.0	15.0	10.0	8.0	–	Tie
GESOP/El Periódico	17–19 Apr 2006	800	?	31.0; 42	32.0; 48/49	16.0; 22/23	10.3; 13	7.4; 8/9	–	1.0
Noxa/La Vanguardia	27–30 Mar 2006	850	?	35.0; 47/48	31.1; 45/46	16.5; 22/23	8.4; 10/11	6.6; 8/9	–	3.9
GESOP/El Periódico	2–4 Feb 2006	800	?	30.7	31.5	14.8	12.9	7.5	–	0.8
Noxa/La Vanguardia	12–15 Dec 2005	850	?	31.7; 42/44	32.8; 47/48	16.3; 23/24	9.6; 11/13	8.9; 10	–	1.1
CiU	3 Dec 2005	?	?	? 40	? 48	? 22	? 15	? 10	–	?
Noxa/La Vanguardia	7–11 Nov 2005	400	?	33.2; 46	27.3; 39/40	16.7; 23/24	13.7; 17/18	7.1; 8/9	–	5.9
Noxa/La Vanguardia	3–6 Oct 2005	1,000	?	32.5; 44	29.2; 43	16.0; 23	12.7; 15	8.9; 10	–	3.3
GESOP/El Periódico	3–5 Oct 2005	800	?	32.0	32.0	15.3	10.8	7.5	–	Tie
Noxa/La Vanguardia	18–21 Jul 2005	1,000	?	33.5; 46	28.9; 41	16.3; 22	12.9; 18	7.2; 8	–	4.6
GESOP/El Periódico	30 Jun–3 Jul 2005	800	?	31.5	31.5	15.5	11.3	7.5	–	Tie
GESOP/El Periódico	20–22 Apr 2005	805	?	30.3	30.3	16.2	12.6	7.8	–	Tie
Noxa/La Vanguardia	7–10 Mar 2005	850	?	34.2; 45/47	29.2; 43/44	15.0; 21/22	10.8; 14	9.3; 10/11	–	5.0
GESOP/El Periódico	16–18 Jan 2005	800	?	34.7	31.6	13.9	10.4	7.0	–	3.1
Noxa/La Vanguardia	10–12 Nov 2004	850	?	32.4; 44	28.9; 43	16.8; 23	10.8; 14	9.6; 11	–	3.5
Vox Pública/El Periódico	28–29 Sep 2004	802	?	33.5	30.7	15.2	11.5	6.7	–	2.8
Vox Pública/El Periódico	30 Jun–1 Jul 2004	800	?	34.0	30.5	15.7	9.8	7.5	–	3.5
2004 EP election	13 Jun 2004	—N/a	39.8	42.9 (60)	17.4 (25)	11.8 (17)	17.8 (24)	7.2 (9)	–	25.1
Vox Pública/El Periódico	14–15 Apr 2004	801	?	33.0	32.0	16.4	9.9	6.1	–	1.0
2004 general election	14 Mar 2004	—N/a	76.0	39.5 (55)	20.8 (31)	15.9 (23)	15.6 (21)	5.8 (5)	–	18.7
2003 regional election	16 Nov 2003	—N/a	62.5	31.2; 42	30.9; 46	16.4; 23	11.9; 15	7.3; 9	–	0.3

=== Voting preferences ===
The table below lists raw, unweighted voting preferences.

Polling firm/Commissioner	Fieldwork date	Sample size	PSC	CiU	ERC	PP	ICV–EUiA	Question	X mark	Lead
2006 regional election (Note: Does not include non-resident citizens.)	1 Nov 2006	—N/a	15.2	17.8	7.9	6.0	5.4	—N/a	43.2	2.6
GESOP/El Periódico	19–21 Oct 2006	1,000	24.7	23.6	11.4	4.1	8.2	17.7	4.4	1.1
CIS	2–15 Oct 2006	1,986	21.9	21.6	11.4	4.6	5.0	18.0	12.6	0.3
DYM/CEO	26 Sep–9 Oct 2006	2,100	19.6	21.4	11.4	4.3	7.6	23.0	7.6	1.8
GESOP/El Periódico	5–7 Oct 2006	1,000	25.0	26.5	11.9	4.1	7.2	15.3	4.7	1.5
GESOP/El Periódico	14–16 Sep 2006	800	27.8	25.3	12.4	4.6	7.3	22.7		2.5
DYM/CEO	26 Jun–10 Jul 2006	2,100	21.8	20.2	12.9	4.3	6.9	23.4	6.7	1.6
GESOP/El Periódico	6–7 Jun 2006	600	27.2	21.0	11.8	4.5	5.8	28.6		6.2
GESOP/El Periódico	15–16 May 2006	600	31.0	21.8	12.2	5.5	7.2	21.9		9.2
GESOP/El Periódico	17–19 Apr 2006	800	28.6	25.5	15.5	4.9	6.1	18.6		3.1
DYM/CEO	6–20 Mar 2006	2,100	18.6	22.5	14.1	4.4	6.1	21.1	9.0	3.9
GESOP/El Periódico	2–4 Feb 2006	800	28.8	23.9	13.5	7.4	6.0	20.3		4.9
Opina/CEO	14–18 Nov 2005	1,900	20.6	20.8	12.3	4.9	6.0	22.8	9.2	0.2
GESOP/El Periódico	3–5 Oct 2005	800	31.5	22.3	15.0	6.1	5.7	19.2		9.2
GESOP/El Periódico	30 Jun–3 Jul 2005	800	29.3	21.8	15.8	6.4	5.9	20.4		7.5
Opina/CEO	6–11 Jun 2005	1,900	21.2	16.8	13.3	4.2	8.4	21.2	10.7	4.4
GESOP/El Periódico	20–22 Apr 2005	805	29.2	22.0	15.5	7.2	6.8	13.9	7.0	7.2
GESOP/El Periódico	16–18 Jan 2005	800	34.4	20.3	11.9	6.1	6.8	13.3	6.1	14.1
Idescat/CEO	19 Oct–2 Nov 2004	1,824	25.5	16.1	13.4	4.2	7.0	25.4	6.2	9.4
Vox Pública/El Periódico	28–29 Sep 2004	802	34.7	18.6	14.1	7.5	6.1	10.8	6.1	16.1
Vox Pública/El Periódico	30 Jun–1 Jul 2004	800	35.5	17.0	14.0	4.8	6.0	11.2	4.9	18.5
2004 EP election	13 Jun 2004	—N/a	17.2	7.0	4.7	7.2	2.9	—N/a	59.7	10.0
Vox Pública/El Periódico	14–15 Apr 2004	801	32.1	24.5	15.5	4.7	6.0	11.2	4.9	7.6
2004 general election	14 Mar 2004	—N/a	30.3	15.9	12.2	11.9	4.5	—N/a	23.0	14.4
2003 regional election	16 Nov 2003	—N/a	19.7	19.6	10.4	7.5	4.6	—N/a	36.6	0.1

=== Victory preferences ===
The table below lists opinion polling on the victory preferences for each party in the event of a regional election taking place.

Polling firm/Commissioner	Fieldwork date	Sample size	PSC	CiU	ERC	PP	ICV–EUiA	Other/ None	Question	Lead
Opina/Cadena SER	23–24 Oct 2006	1,200	28.3	26.6	11.2	6.0	6.2	6.7	15.0	1.7
Opina/El País	22 Oct 2006	1,500	29.6	30.1	–	–	–	40.3		0.5
CIS	2–15 Oct 2006	1,986	27.6	27.1	13.2	4.5	6.2	1.3	20.1	0.5
Opina/Cadena SER	11 Oct 2006	?	28.4	30.7	11.5	4.8	6.3	7.2	11.3	2.3
Noxa/La Vanguardia	5–9 Oct 2006	1,000	29.0	33.0	11.0	6.0	8.0	13.0		4.0
Noxa/La Vanguardia	18–21 Sep 2006	1,000	34.0	27.0	13.0	6.0	7.0	13.0		7.0
Noxa/La Vanguardia	17–19 Jul 2006	800	41.0	27.0	12.0	6.0	6.0	8.0		14.0
Opina/El País	7–8 Jun 2006	1,000	32.8	25.2	10.8	5.2	4.7	1.9	19.5	7.6
Opina/Cadena SER	30 May 2006	1,000	29.3	26.2	9.6	7.1	4.9	1.2	21.7	3.1

=== Victory likelihood ===
The table below lists opinion polling on the perceived likelihood of victory for each party in the event of a regional election taking place.

Polling firm/Commissioner	Fieldwork date	Sample size	PSC	CiU	ERC	PP	ICV–EUiA	Other/ None	Question	Lead
Opina/Cadena SER	23–24 Oct 2006	1,200	23.5	51.4	1.8	0.7	0.1	–	22.6	11.5
CIS	2–15 Oct 2006	1,986	30.1	41.6	1.6	0.9	0.2	0.1	25.5	11.5
Opina/Cadena SER	11 Oct 2006	?	26.6	48.8	2.7	1.5	0.4	–	20.1	22.2
Noxa/La Vanguardia	5–9 Oct 2006	1,000	32.0	46.0	2.0	2.0	–	18.0		14.0
Noxa/La Vanguardia	18–21 Sep 2006	1,000	35.0	38.0	1.0	3.0	–	23.0		3.0
Noxa/La Vanguardia	17–19 Jul 2006	800	41.0	37.0	1.0	2.0	1.0	18.0		4.0
Opina/El País	7–8 Jun 2006	1,000	36.6	33.2	2.0	1.5	1.5	0.4	24.7	3.4
Opina/Cadena SER	30 May 2006	1,000	30.6	35.9	2.1	3.3	0.3	0.3	27.7	5.3

=== Preferred President ===
The table below lists opinion polling on leader preferences to become president of the Government of Catalonia.

All candidates

Polling firm/Commissioner	Fieldwork date	Sample size							Other/ None/ Not care	Question	Lead
Polling firm/Commissioner	Fieldwork date	Sample size	Maragall PSC	Montilla PSC	Mas CiU	Carod ERC	Piqué PP	Saura ICV–EUiA	Other/ None/ Not care	Question	Lead
Opina/Cadena SER	23–24 Oct 2006	1,200	–	27.2	27.4	10.8	5.9	5.2	8.5	15.0	0.2
Opina/El País	22 Oct 2006	1,500	–	28.6	30.8	–	–	–	40.6		2.2
GESOP/El Periódico	19–21 Oct 2006	1,000	–	23.8	25.1	9.1	0.9	5.6	10.1	25.4	1.3
Opina/Cadena SER	16 Oct 2006	1,000	–	26.9	31.2	–	–	–	41.9		4.3
CIS	2–15 Oct 2006	1,986	–	20.2	28.3	12.5	4.9	6.8	5.5	21.7	8.1
Opina/Cadena SER	11 Oct 2006	?	–	26.9	31.2	9.0	5.3	4.6	9.0	14.0	4.3
Celeste-Tel/Terra	10 Oct 2006	?	–	26.7	27.5	8.2	7.2	3.4	27.0		0.8
GESOP/El Periódico	5–7 Oct 2006	1,000	–	22.6	29.7	8.4	0.4	5.6	12.8	20.5	7.1
GESOP/El Periódico	14–16 Sep 2006	800	–	19.9	29.6	8.9	1.3	6.3	10.4	23.6	9.7
GESOP/El Periódico	15–16 May 2006	600	31.7	–	24.8	10.5	6.2	6.2	20.6		6.9
GESOP/El Periódico	17–19 Apr 2006	800	29.8	–	25.6	12.8	7.8	7.5	16.5		4.2
GESOP/El Periódico	2–4 Feb 2006	800	32.4	–	27.1	10.1	7.3	6.0	17.1		5.3
GESOP/El Periódico	3–5 Oct 2005	800	35.0	–	24.2	12.4	7.0	6.6	14.8		10.8
GESOP/El Periódico	30 Jun–3 Jul 2005	800	32.3	–	22.5	10.9	7.8	8.5	18.0		9.8
GESOP/El Periódico	20–22 Apr 2005	805	32.8	–	20.4	14.5	7.6	6.7	18.0		12.4
GESOP/El Periódico	16–18 Jan 2005	800	41.5	–	19.6	10.8	7.4	6.6	8.5	5.8	21.9
Vox Pública/El Periódico	28–29 Sep 2004	802	39.0	–	19.8	14.0	7.5	6.2	12.4	1.0	19.2
Vox Pública/El Periódico	30 Jun–1 Jul 2004	800	39.8	–	15.9	13.0	6.3	5.5	17.2	2.5	23.9
Vox Pública/El Periódico	14–15 Apr 2004	801	40.2	–	20.7	13.6	6.2	4.2	15.1		19.5

Montilla vs. Mas

Polling firm/Commissioner	Fieldwork date	Sample size			Other/ None/ Not care	Question	Lead
Polling firm/Commissioner	Fieldwork date	Sample size	Montilla PSC	Mas CiU	Other/ None/ Not care	Question	Lead
GESOP/El Periódico	19–21 Oct 2006	1,000	37.6	44.1	18.3		6.5
Feedback/RAC 1	18–20 Oct 2006	1,000	33.5	46.3	13.4	6.8	12.8
Feedback/RAC 1	10–13 Oct 2006	1,000	36.0	45.6	11.6	6.8	9.6
Noxa/La Vanguardia	5–9 Oct 2006	1,000	34.0	50.0	10.0	6.0	16.0
GESOP/El Periódico	5–7 Oct 2006	1,000	36.1	45.6	18.3		9.5
Feedback/RAC 1	3–6 Oct 2006	1,000	38.8	44.7	9.9	6.5	5.9
Feedback/RAC 1	20–22 Sep 2006	1,000	35.7	44.9	10.5	8.8	9.2
GESOP/El Periódico	14–16 Sep 2006	800	33.6	48.3	18.1		14.7
Noxa/La Vanguardia	18–21 Sep 2006	1,000	36.0	43.0	12.0	9.0	7.0
Feedback/RAC 1	12–15 Sep 2006	1,000	33.6	47.7	10.9	7.8	14.1
Noxa/La Vanguardia	17–19 Jul 2006	800	36.0	39.0	16.0	9.0	3.0

Maragall vs. Mas

Polling firm/Commissioner	Fieldwork date	Sample size			Other/ None/ Not care	Question	Lead
Polling firm/Commissioner	Fieldwork date	Sample size	Maragall PSC	Mas CiU	Other/ None/ Not care	Question	Lead
GESOP/El Periódico	2–4 Feb 2006	800	49.9	39.1	11.0		10.8
GESOP/El Periódico	3–5 Oct 2005	800	53.8	34.5	11.7		19.3
GESOP/El Periódico	30 Jun–3 Jul 2005	800	52.9	35.4	11.7		17.5
GESOP/El Periódico	20–22 Apr 2005	805	53.5	33.0	13.5		20.5
GESOP/El Periódico	16–18 Jan 2005	800	59.4	31.1	9.5		28.3
Vox Pública/El Periódico	28–29 Sep 2004	802	59.6	28.7	11.7		30.9
Vox Pública/El Periódico	30 Jun–1 Jul 2004	800	59.9	26.4	13.7		33.5
Vox Pública/El Periódico	14–15 Apr 2004	801	58.3	32.0	9.7		26.3
Vox Pública/El Periódico	Jan 2004	?	52.7	34.2	13.1		18.5

=== Predicted President ===
The table below lists opinion polling on the perceived likelihood for each leader to become president.

Polling firm/Commissioner	Fieldwork date	Sample size						Other/ None/ Not care	Question	Lead
Polling firm/Commissioner	Fieldwork date	Sample size	Montilla PSC	Mas CiU	Carod ERC	Piqué PP	Saura ICV–EUiA	Other/ None/ Not care	Question	Lead
Opina/Cadena SER	23–24 Oct 2006	1,200	21.6	49.4	0.7	1.0	0.0	2.1	25.0	27.8
Opina/El País	22 Oct 2006	1,500	23.7	48.9	–	–	–	27.4		25.2
Opina/Cadena SER	16 Oct 2006	1,000	23.3	48.8	–	–	–	27.9		25.5
Opina/Cadena SER	11 Oct 2006	?	23.3	48.5	1.6	1.0	0.4	3.2	22.1	25.2
Noxa/La Vanguardia	17–19 Jul 2006	800	35.0	53.0	–	–	–	1.0	11.0	18.0

== Voter turnout ==
The table below shows registered voter turnout during the election. Figures for election day do not include non-resident citizens, while final figures do.

Province	Time (Election day)									Final		
Province	13:00			18:00			20:00			Final		
Province	2003	2006	+/–	2003	2006	+/–	2003	2006	+/–	2003	2006	+/–
Barcelona	26.00%	25.58%	−0.42	50.79%	45.25%	−5.54	62.94%	56.69%	−6.25	62.10%	55.94%	−6.16
Girona	29.23%	27.32%	−1.91	54.76%	47.69%	−7.07	65.95%	57.67%	−8.28	65.27%	57.13%	−8.14
Lleida	25.45%	24.26%	−1.19	52.78%	47.08%	−5.70	66.97%	60.30%	−6.67	65.47%	59.00%	−6.47
Tarragona	26.21%	23.87%	−2.34	49.92%	42.53%	−7.39	62.33%	54.64%	−7.69	61.67%	54.13%	−7.54
Total	26.27%	25.49%	−0.78	51.17%	45.30%	−5.87	63.38%	56.78%	−6.60	62.54%	56.04%	−6.50

== Results ==
=== Overall ===
← Summary of the 1 November 2006 Parliament of Catalonia election results →
Parties and alliances	Popular vote			Seats	
Parties and alliances	Votes	%	±pp	Total	+/−
Convergence and Union (CiU)	935,756	31.52	+0.58	48	+2
Socialists' Party of Catalonia–Citizens for Change (PSC–CpC)	796,173	26.82	−4.34	37	−5
Republican Left of Catalonia (ERC)	416,355	14.03	−2.41	21	−2
People's Party (PP)	316,222	10.65	−1.24	14	−1
Initiative for Catalonia Greens–United and Alternative Left (ICV–EUiA)	282,693	9.52	+2.24	12	+3
Citizens–Party of the Citizenry (C's)	89,840	3.03	New	3	+3
The Greens–Ecologists and Greens of Catalonia (EV–EVC)	17,900	0.60	+0.04	0	±0
Anti-Bullfighting Party Against Mistreatment of Animals (PACMA)	13,730	0.46	New	0	±0
Unsubmissive Seats–Alternative of Discontented Democrats (Ei–ADD)	6,922	0.23	+0.16	0	±0
Catalan Republican Party (RC)	6,024	0.20	New	0	±0
Internationalist Socialist Workers' Party (POSI)	5,632	0.19	+0.06	0	±0
Communist Party of the Catalan People (PCPC)	4,798	0.16	+0.08	0	±0
The Greens–Green Alternative (EV–AV)	3,228	0.11	+0.05	0	±0
Family and Life Party (PFiV)	2,776	0.09	New	0	±0
Forward Catalonia Platform (AES–DN)	2,735	0.09	New	0	±0
Humanist Party of Catalonia (PHC)	2,608	0.09	+0.04	0	±0
Republican Social Movement (MSR)	1,096	0.04	+0.02	0	±0
Carmel/Blue Party (PAzul)	1,039	0.04	New	0	±0
For a Fairer World (PUM+J)	945	0.03	New	0	±0
Catalonia Decides (Decideix.cat)	668	0.02	New	0	±0
Citizens for Blank Votes (CenB)	626	0.02	+0.01	0	±0
Republican Left–Left Republican Party (IR–PRE)	524	0.02	−0.03	0	±0
Blank ballots	60,244	2.03	+1.12		
Total	2,968,534			135	±0
Valid votes	2,968,534	99.54	−0.20		
Invalid votes	13,574	0.46	+0.20		
Votes cast / turnout	2,982,108	56.04	−6.50		
Abstentions	2,339,166	43.96	+6.50		
Registered voters	5,321,274				

Popular vote
CiU	31.52%
PSC–CpC	26.82%
ERC	14.03%
PP	10.65%
ICV–EUiA	9.52%
C's	3.03%
Others	2.40%
Blank ballots	2.03%

Seats
CiU	35.56%
PSC–CpC	27.41%
ERC	15.56%
PP	10.37%
ICV–EUiA	8.89%
C's	2.22%

=== Distribution by constituency ===
Constituency	CiU		PSC–CpC		ERC		PP		ICV–EUiA		C's	
Constituency	%	S	%	S	%	S	%	S	%	S	%	S
Barcelona	29.9	27	27.9	25	12.6	11	11.2	10	10.4	9	3.5	3
Girona	38.2	7	22.1	4	19.2	4	7.2	1	7.6	1	0.9	−
Lleida	40.0	7	22.0	3	17.7	3	9.1	1	6.6	1	1.0	−
Tarragona	32.4	7	26.0	5	17.6	3	11.0	2	6.5	1	2.4	−
Total	31.5	48	26.8	37	14.0	21	10.7	14	9.5	12	3.0	3

== Aftermath ==
=== Government formation ===
Investiture; Nomination of José Montilla (PSC)
Ballot →	24 November 2006
Required majority →	68 out of 135
Yes: • PSC–CpC (37); • ERC (21); • ICV–EUiA (12)	70 / 135
No: • CiU (48); • PP (14); • C's (3)	65 / 135
Abstentions	0 / 135
Absentees	0 / 135

== Bibliography ==
- Ley Orgánica 4/1979, de 18 de diciembre, de Estatuto de Autonomía de Cataluña (Organic Law 4/1979). Official State Gazette (in Spanish). 18 December 1979. BOE-A-1979-30178.
- Ley 3/1982, de 23 de marzo, del Parlamento, del Presidente y del Consejo Ejecutivo de la Generalidad (Law 3/1982). Official State Gazette (in Spanish). 23 March 1982. BOE-A-1982-10330.
- Ley 8/1985, de 24 de mayo, de modificación de la Ley 3/1982, de 23 de marzo, del Parlamento, del Presidente y del Consejo Ejecutivo de la Generalidad de Cataluña (Law 8/1985). Official State Gazette (in Spanish). 24 May 1985. BOE-A-1985-16307.
- Ley Orgánica 5/1985, de 19 de junio, del Régimen Electoral General (Organic Law 5/1985). Official State Gazette (in Spanish). 19 June 1985 [version as of 29 November 2003]. BOE-A-1985-11672.
- Ley Orgánica 6/2006, de 19 de julio, de reforma del Estatuto de Autonomía de Cataluña (Organic Law 6/2006). Official State Gazette (in Spanish). 19 July 2006 [version as of 20 July 2006]. BOE-A-2006-13087.
- Decreto 340/2006, de 7 de septiembre, de convocatoria de elecciones al Parlamento de Cataluña y de su disolución (PDF) (Decree 340/2006). Official Journal of the Government of Catalonia (in Spanish). 7 September 2006.
