= Josep-Lluís Carod-Rovira =

Spanish politician

The Honourable Josep-Lluís Carod-Rovira
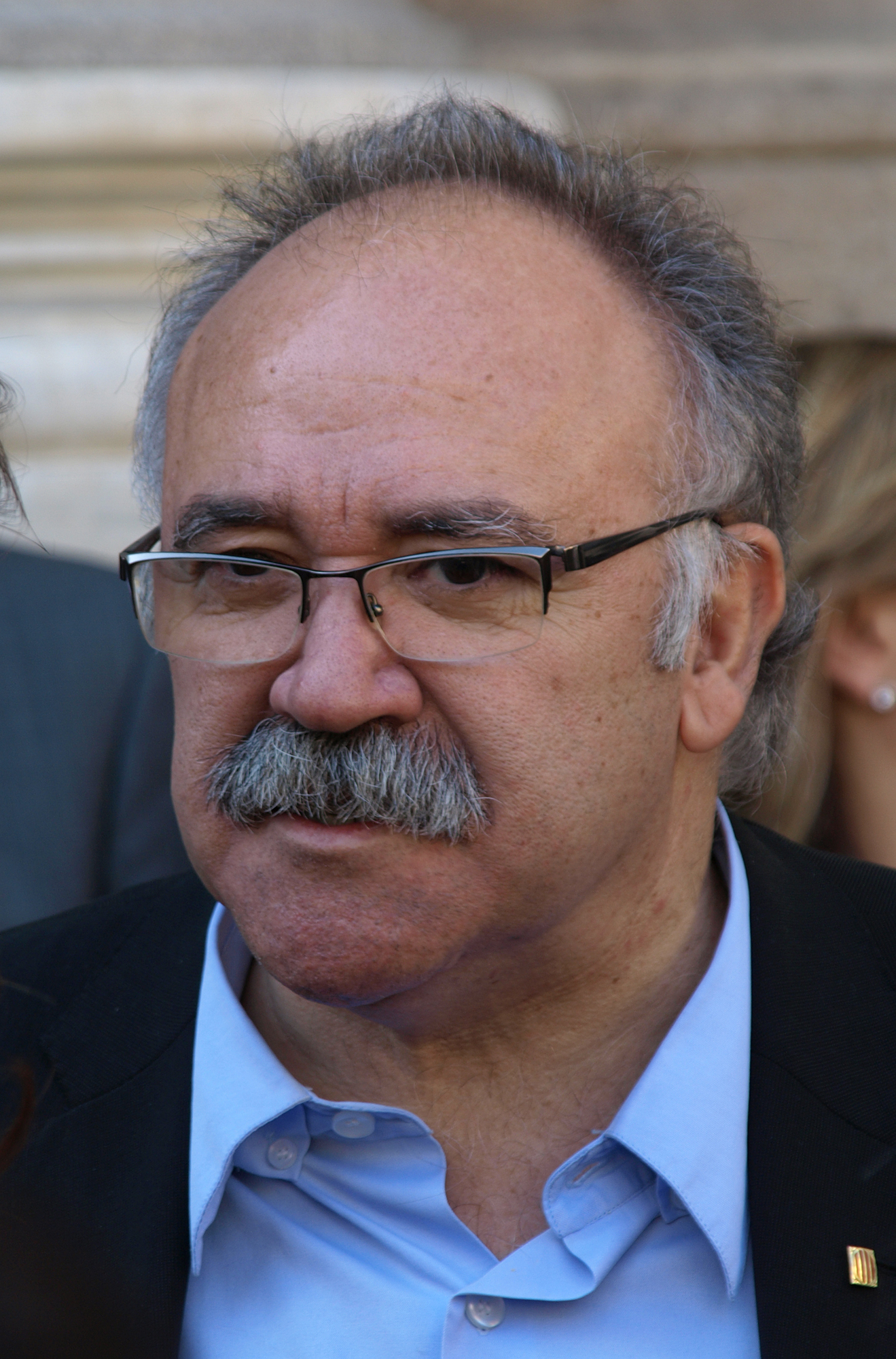

1st Vice President of the Generalitat de Catalunya
- In office 29 November 2006 – 29 December 2010
- President: José Montilla
- Preceded by: none
- Succeeded by: Joana Ortega (as Vice President and Minister of Governance and Institutional Relations)

2nd First Minister of the Generalitat de Catalunya
- In office 17 December 2003 – 20 February 2004
- President: Pasqual Maragall
- Preceded by: Artur Mas
- Succeeded by: Josep Bargalló

Personal details
- Born: 17 May 1952 (age 73) Cambrils, Tarragona, Catalonia, (Spain)
- Party: Republican Left of Catalonia
- Spouse: Teresa Comas
- Occupation: Politician and Philologist

Josep-Lluís Carod-Rovira (Catalan pronunciation: [ʒuˈzɛb ʎuˈis kəˈɾɔd ruˈβiɾə]; born 17 May 1952 in Cambrils, Catalonia, Spain) is a Catalan politician. He was the vice-president of the Catalan Government from 2006 to 2010. From 1996 to 2008 he was the leader of the Republican Left of Catalonia (Esquerra Republicana de Catalunya, ERC). ERC campaigns for Catalonia's independence from Spain and, secondarily, extend it to other Catalan Countries, the whole Catalan linguistic domain.

He was one of the two vice presidents of the Catalan autonomous government formed after the 2006 Catalan regional election. He now serves as vice president of the Ramon Llull Foundation. Previously, after the previous 2003 cabinet, he was appointed First Minister (Catalan: conseller en cap) of the Generalitat de Catalunya. After his, at times, controversial style, eventually the other partners in the cabinet forced him to resign after his action culminated in a secret meeting with representatives of the Basque separatist group ETA, which was leaked to the press; this was followed by general political pressure asking for his resignation.

== Education and professional background ==
Carod-Rovira received a bachelor's degree in Catalan philology from the UB. He then enrolled as a teacher of the Catalan language at the University School of Tarragona (from 1978 to 1982). In the university world, he was also professor and vice president of the Catalan Summer University (Universitat Catalana d'Estiu) between 1986 and 1995. Before this, he also worked as Head Technician of Generalitat's linguistic planning policy (1981–1988) and headed the Cultural Territorial Services of the Generalitat at Tarragona (1982 to 1984).

== Civic background ==
Carod-Rovira has been involved in several civic organisations, among which are Òmnium Cultural (member of its board between 1986 and 1995 and president of its Tarragonès division), Llull-Federació d'Entitats dels Països Catalans (member of its board between 1991 and 1995), the castellers association Colla Jove Xiquets de Tarragona (colla means association), the Catalan Language Writers Association, the PEN Club of Catalonia and the Societat Catalana d'Onomàstica.

As a writer, he has published Rovira i Virgili i la qüestió nacional (1994), Marcel·lí Domingo, de l'escola a la República (1988), Tornar amb la gent (1997), Jubilar la Transició (1998), El futur a les mans (2003) and La nova Catalunya (2003). He also has contributed in the Catalans from America Dictionary and in the book America and Catalonia, as well as several encyclopedias and specialized magazines. He has won several awards for historical essays and journalism.

== Political background ==
He was actively involved in the fight against the authoritarian government of Franco and was jailed in 1973 when the 113 members of the Permanent Board of Assembly of Catalonia were arrested and the board was dissolved. Before entering, in 1987, ERC, he was an active member of the Socialist National Liberation Party (PSAN) between 1970 and 1977 and of the Left Nationalists (NE) between 1980 and 1986. Carod-Rovira also wrote the Resolution about the right to self-determination of the Catalan nation in 1989.

Carod-Rovira was first elected general secretary of ERC in November 1996, in the 21st National Congress of the party at Vilafranca del Penedès. He was reelected in Girona (22nd National Congress) by July 1998 and in Tarragona (23rd National Congress) by March 2001.

Carod-Rovira is president of ERC since its 24th National Congress, held in Lleida on 3 and 4 July 2004.

After the Catalan elections in 2003, he achieved the position of First Minister of the Catalan government between December 2003 and January 2004 in the coalition government led by socialist Pasqual Maragall, when he was forced to resign over his secret meeting with ETA. He subsequently became a candidate for the Spanish Congress of Deputies in the elections of March 2004 and his party got eight seats and almost quadrupled its popular support. This represented a major boost for ERC, which had had at most one seat since the establishment of the Spanish modern democracy in 1979. After the elections, Carod-Rovira asked for its substitution as a deputy and remained in the Catalan Parliament.

== Institutional background ==
Josep-Lluís Carod-Rovira has been deputy at the Parliament of Catalonia since 1988 and also was First Minister of the Generalitat de Catalunya between December 2003 and January 2004. He was the vice president of the Catalan Government in the eighth constituency.

Political offices
Preceded by New title	Vice President of the Generalitat de Catalunya; 2006 – 2010	Succeeded by Joana Ortega (as Vice President and Minister of Governance and Institutional Relations)
Preceded by Artur Mas	First Minister of Catalonia; 2003–2004	Succeeded by Josep Bargalló
Party political offices
Preceded by Jordi Carbonell	President of ERC; 2004 – 2008	Succeeded by Joan Puigcercós
Preceded by Àngel Colom i Colom	General Secretary of ERC; 1996 – 2004	Succeeded by Joan Puigcercós
