= Sirera =

Sirera is a surname. Notable people with the surname include:

- Daniel Sirera (born 1967), Spanish politician
- Flors Sirera (1963–1997), Spanish nurse and aid worker
