= Uriel Bertran =

Catalan pro-independence politician and economist (born 1976)

- Uriel Bertran i Arrué
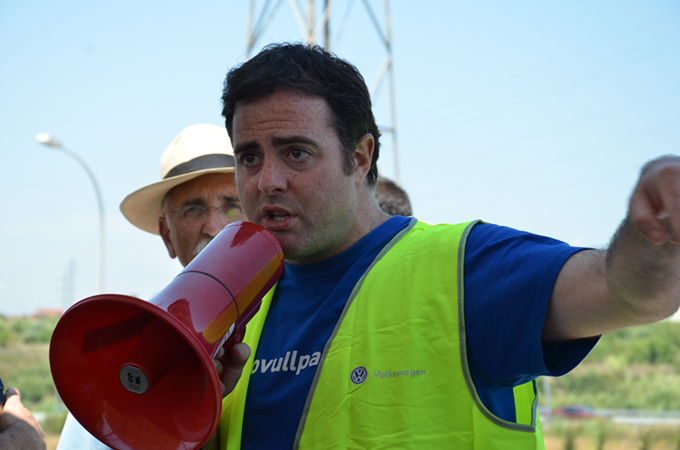
- Uriel Bertran in 2012

Deputy in Parliament of Catalonia for Barcelona
- In office 2003–2012

Personal details
- Born: July 11, 1976 (age 50) Badalona, Spain
- Party: Republican Left of Catalonia(ERC) (1994-2010); Catalan Solidarity for Independence(SCI) (2010-present)
- Other political affiliations: Assemblea Nacional Catalana (ANC) (2022-present)
- Education: Pompeu Fabra University
- Occupation: Economist; Politician; Associate Professor
- Website: http://www.uriel.cat/

Uriel Bertran i Arrué (born Jully 11,1976) is a Spanish Associate Professor, Economist, and pro-Catalan independence Politician. He is known for leading the Esquerra Independentista movement within the ERC and co-founding the Catalan Solidarity for Independence party (SI), alongside Joan Laporta and Alfons López Tena. In the 2010 Catalan parliament election he was elected a Deputy for the constituency of Barcelona, serving until 2012.

== Background ==
He graduated with a Master's degree in Economics from Pompeu Fabra University, writing his thesis on economic structural changes' effect on the worldwide economic growth rate. In 1993, he joined the Republican Youth of Catalonia (JERC) and in 1994 the Republican Left of Catalonia (ERC). In 1997 he was elected National Spokesperson of the JERC, a position he held until 2003; as the top youth leader, Bertran was present in the national leadership of the ERC party. He also collaborated with the Insubordinate movement of Spain.

He is currently an adjunct professor in the Economics department at the University of Barcelona and has taught courses at Catalan Summer University. He often writes for various Catalan publications, such as Avui, El Punt, El Periódico de Catalunya y El Temps.

== Electoral history ==
In the 2003 Catalan Elections he was elected a Deputy in the Parliament of Catalonia for the ERC, after which the Catalan Tripartite was formed. In July 2004, the party's National Congress elected him as National Secretary of Image and Communication. With this new responsibility, he designed a campaign advocating for the "no" vote on the referendum for the Statute of Autonomy of Catalonia of 2006. He ran again in the 2006 Catalan election and was again elected Deputy.

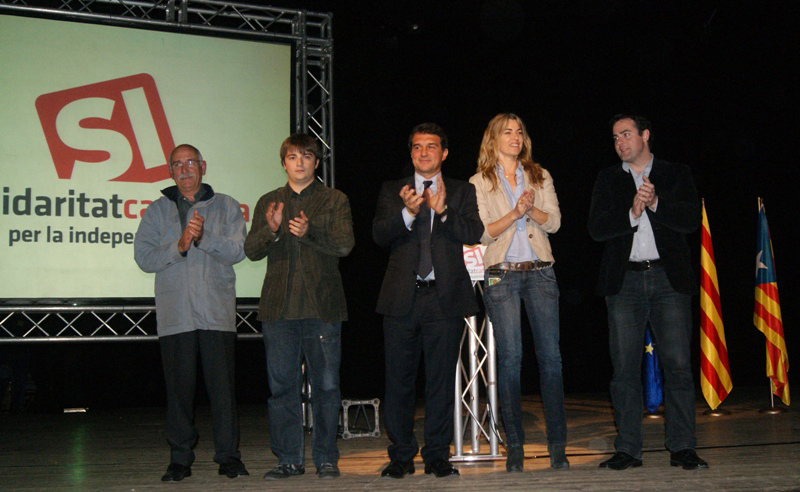
Uriel Bertran (farthest right) at a Catalan Solidarity for Independence campaign event in 2010

But, the loss of votes in these and in the subsequent 2007 Spanish local elections in addition to the lack of political ambition of the "Second Tripartite" pushed him to lead an internal movement within the ERC. The movements manifesto was made public June 5, 2007: it demanded the beginning of the process to call a national referendum on the Independence of Catalonia and the convening of the party's National Congress to debate the project. Joan Puigcercós forced him to resign from the leadership of the ERC immediately.

In December 2009, Bertran was an organizer and spokesperson for a symbolic referendum vote on the question of Catalan independence.

Subsequently, from 2007 to 2010 Uriel Bertran, together with Elisenda Paluzie, Héctor López Bofill, and Pilar Dellunde, led a line of thought within the ERC dubbed Esquerra Independentista (Independentist Left). This internal movement proposed change to the party's strategy in an effort to be more consistent with its Pro-Independence, Republican, and Left-wing ideology. Their main objective was to revitalize the ERC after repeated electoral declines.

== Catalan solidarity for independence ==
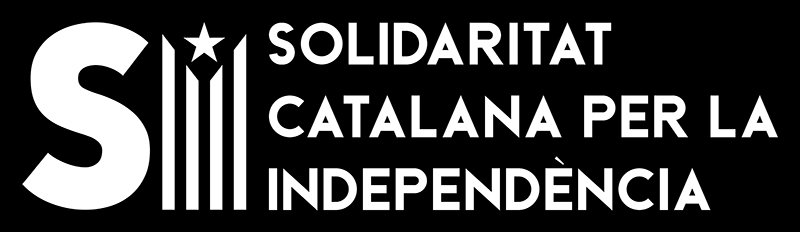
Catalan Solidarity for Independence Logo approved by members in 2020

In July 2010, he created, along with Joan Laporta and Alfons López Tena, the political party Catalan Solidarity for Independence (SI). All of the founders ran as SI candidates in the 2010 Catalan parliamentary election. This included Bertran, who was elected a Deputy for Barcelona, once again. At that time, he officially ceased being an ERC member. He was the General Secretary of SI.

He left the leadership of SI in 2022, but remained in the party and its activities.

== Assemblea Nacional Catalana ==
In 2022, Uriel Bertran joined the organization Assemblea Nacional Catalana (ANC), a pro-independence advocacy group/movement, and was elected the National Secretariat of the organization.

=== 2023-2024 vice presidential run ===
Bertran ran a campaign for the 2024 election of the ANC's vice president, but withdrew before the election in the name of stability, remaining in his position.
