= Montserrat Nebrera González =

Spanish politician and university lecturer

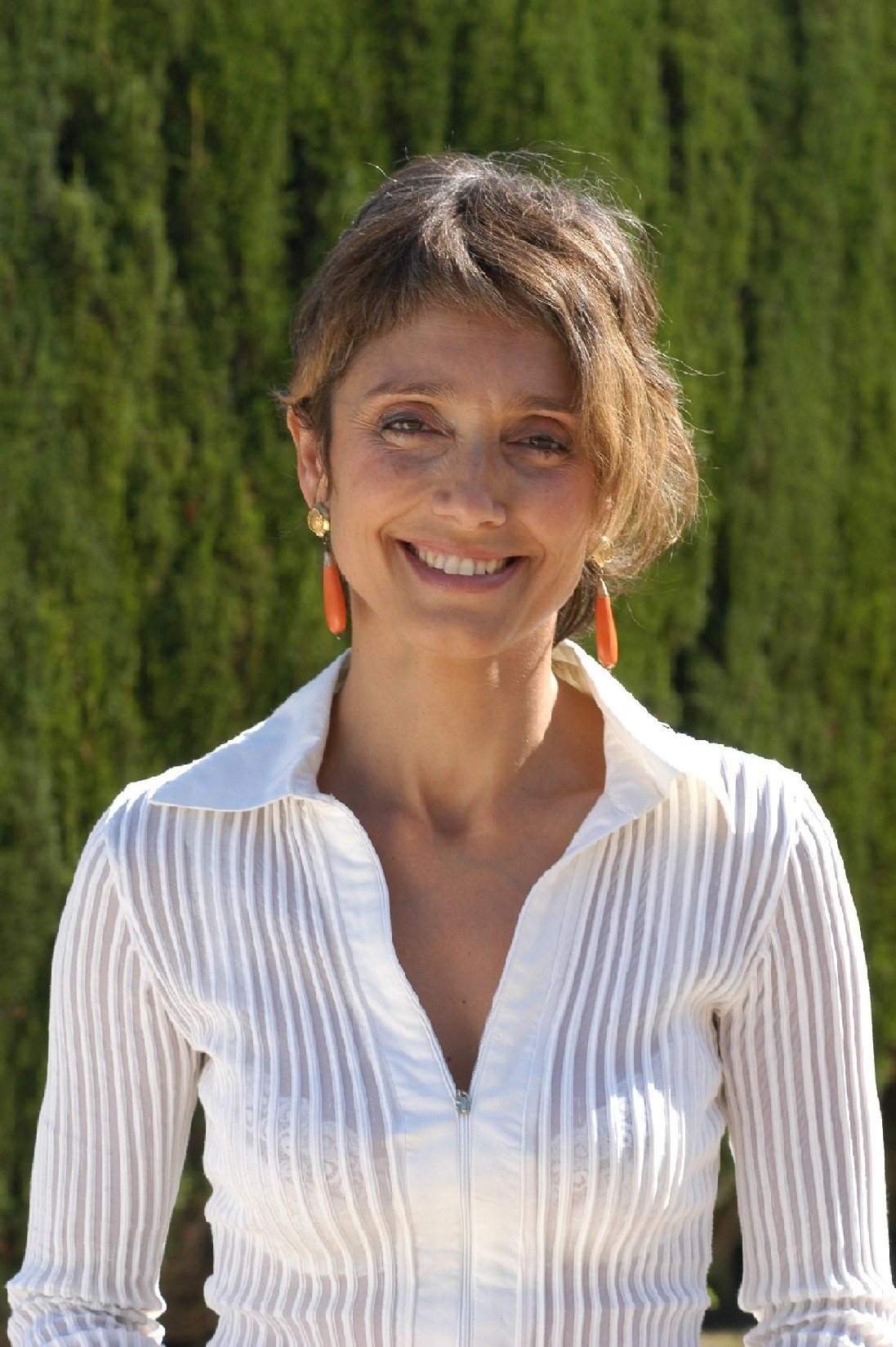

Member of the Catalan Parliament
- In office 2006–2009

Personal details
- Born: 11 July 1961 (age 64) Barcelona, Catalonia, Spain
- Citizenship: Spain
- Party: Partido Popular de Cataluña

Montserrat Nebrera González (Barcelona, 11 July 1961) is a Spanish politician and university lecturer.

She holds a degree in Political Philosophy and Classical Philology and a PhD in Law from the University of Barcelona. She is Professor of Constitutional Law at the International University of Catalonia. She was a member of the Catalan Parliament for the Partido Popular de Cataluña (PPC) until her resignation in October 2009.

== Professional career ==
She combined teaching at the International University of Catalonia with the position of Director of Social Studies at the Cambó Institute, a post she left after standing as a candidate for the PPC in the 2006 Catalan Parliament elections.

She is a frequent contributor to regional and national audiovisual and print media.

== Political career ==
She was a member of parliament for the Partido Popular from 2006 to 2009, running as number two on the PPC list for Barcelona in the last regional elections.

She served on two parliamentary committees, as Chair of the Justice, Law and Security Committee and as Spokesperson of the Interior and Immigration Committee in the Parliament of Catalonia. She has been a lawyer and support magistrate at the Provincial Court for the seven years prior to entering politics and for more than twenty years she has worked as a researcher and lecturer in Constitutional Law.

Affiliated to the PPC since November 2007, she had already outlined what in her opinion should be the way to achieve the PPC's objectives, on 13 March of the same year.

On 18 April 2008 she presented her candidacy for the presidency of the PPC. Finally, on 5 July of that year, she won the support of just over 43% of his party's delegates, against a consensus candidacy represented by Alicia Sánchez-Camacho and promoted by the national leadership of its President, Mariano Rajoy.

After this, she abandoned her candidacy for the 2010 elections to the Catalan Parliament, heading the lists of Alternativa de Govern por Barcelona, without obtaining parliamentary representation.

Subsequently, in July 2014 it was announced that she would be the candidate for Convergència Democràtica de Catalunya (CDC) for the mayoralty of San Just Desvern.

== Controversies ==
In January 2009 she was the protagonist of an intense controversy when she criticised the "accent " of the Minister of Public Works, Magdalena Álvarez, on the occasion of the problems that had occurred at Barajas airport in the previous days. These statements caused a great deal of controversy, especially in Andalusia. She was also disavowed by the secretary general of the PP of Catalonia, Jordi Cornet. Meanwhile, the PP of Andalusia called on Nebrera to leave the party. Although Nebrera retracted her words, the PP of Catalonia opened a file against her.

Nebrera was again reprimanded in March 2009 for her criticism of Alicia Sánchez-Camacho's administration, having labelled her a "pharisee".

On 19 October 2009, she resigned her seat and announced her decision to leave the PP in a letter to its president, Mariano Rajoy.
