= Toni Strubell i Trueta =

Catalan linguist and politician (born 1952)

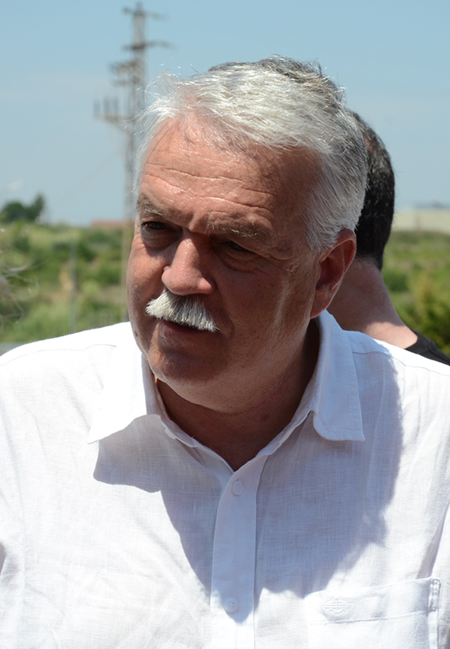
- Toni Strubell in 2012
- Born: Toni Strubell i Trueta; 25 June 1952 (age 73); Oxford, England
- Occupation: Professor
- Known for: Coordinator of Dignity Commission
- Political party: Solidaritat Catalana per la Independència

Toni Strubell i Trueta (born 25 June 1952 in Oxford, England) is a Catalan linguist and former member of the Parliament of Catalonia.

== Biography ==
He studied modern languages at the University of Oxford and in 1978 moved to Olot, where he collaborated with Ràdio Olot in its program News from the Catalan Countries (Notícies dels Països Catalans), which had a big following both in the Garrotxa as well as in Osona. In 1981, he moved to the Basque Country and gave classes in English at the University of Deusto until 2001.

He has given and organized classes at the Catalan Summer University and on translation at the Official School of Languages in Barcelona. He has collaborated with the following newspapers: El Punt, Avui, S'Arenal, El Temps, Presència, La Vanguardia, El Periódico de Catalunya, Egin, and with the BBC. He participated in Convergència Democràtica de Catalunya's Winter School in 1997, and in the Congressional debates of the Republican Left of Catalonia (ERC) in Manresa. He has translated numerous books.

He is the coordinator of the Dignity Commission, an initiative to recover the Catalan documents plundered by Francisco Franco and deposited in the General Civil War Archive in Salamanca. He is the coordinator of the Lluís Companys Batzordea Association which organized the Catalan-Basque meetings in Donostia in January and May 2003. In 2002, he received the prestigious Saint George's Cross.

He is a fmember of the Catalan Solidarity for Independence political coalition and, during the primaries of 4 September, was chosen as the candidate for Girona in the elections for the Catalan Parliament, to be held on 28 November 2010.

== Personal life ==
He is son of Michael B. Strubell and Amèlia Trueta (daughter of Josep Trueta i Raspall) and brother of Miquel Strubell i Trueta.

== Books ==
- Sunyol, l'altre president afusellat (Josep Sunyol, the other martyred president) (1996) with Carles Llorens and Josep Maria Solé i Sabaté
- El cansament del catalanisme (1997)
- Josep Roca i Ferreras and the origin of the Catalanist Left (2000) with Fèlix Cucurull i Tey
- Un català entre bascos (A Catalan among Basques) (2005)
- El moment de dir prou (When to Say Enough) (2008)
- Josep-Narcís Roca i Ferreras, 1834-1891 (2008)
- What Catalans Want (2011)
