= Alicia Sánchez-Camacho =

Spanish politician (born 1967)

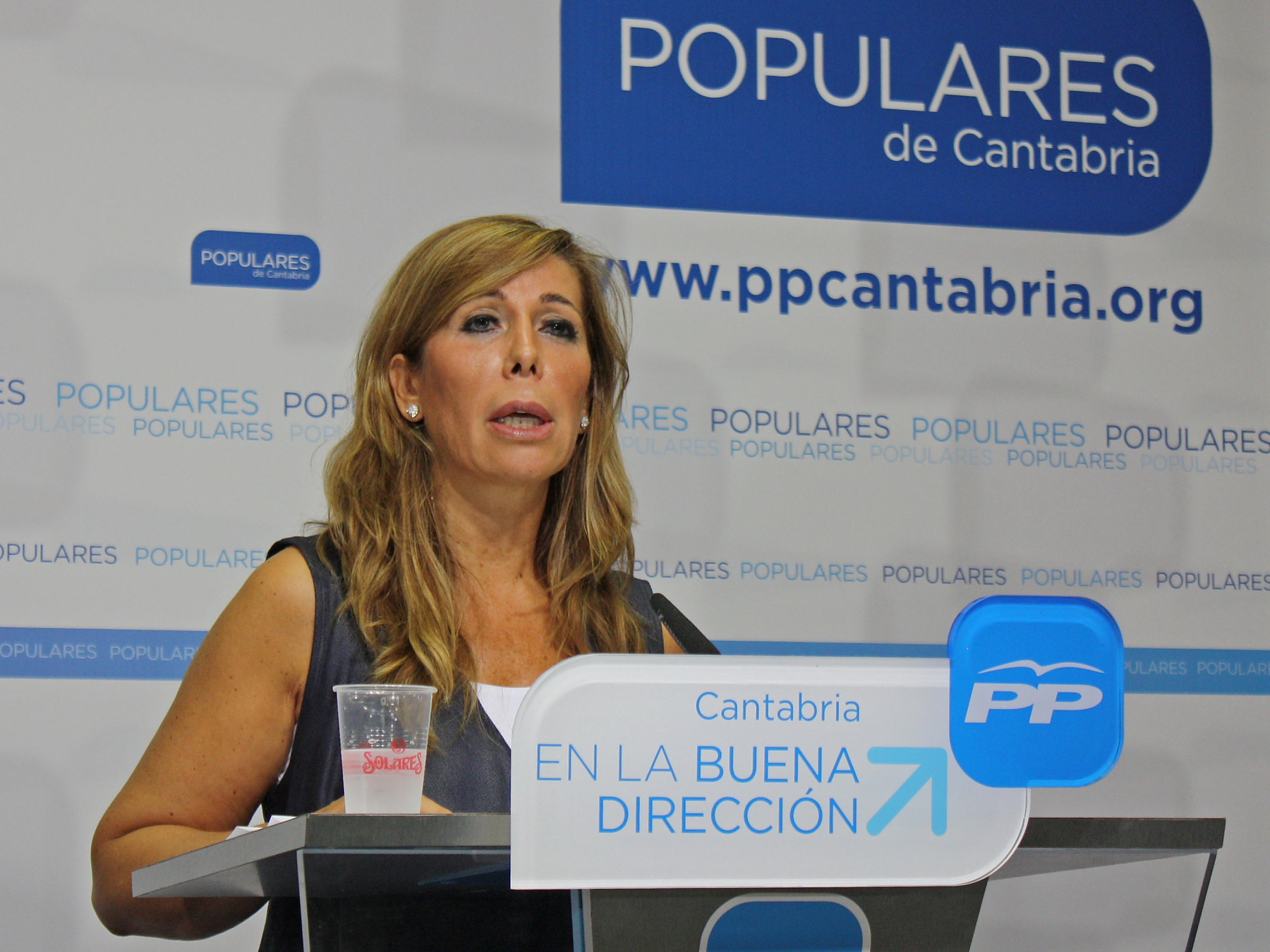
- Sánchez-Camacho in 2014

First Secretary of the Congress of Deputies
- In office 13 January 2016 – 21 May 2019
- Preceded by: Ignacio Gil
- Succeeded by: Gerardo Pisarello

Member of the Assembly of Madrid
- Incumbent
- Assumed office 11 June 2019

Member of the Catalan Parliament
- In office 6 July 2008 – 27 October 2015
- Constituency: Barcelona

Member of the Congress of Deputies
- In office 14 March 2004 – 9 March 2008
- Constituency: Barcelona and Girona

Senator for designation of Catalan Parliament
- In office 22 April 2008 – 13 January 2016

President of People's Party of Catalonia
- In office 6 July 2008 – 25 March 2017
- Preceded by: Daniel Sirera
- Succeeded by: Xavier García Albiol

Personal details
- Born: Alicia Sánchez-Camacho Pérez; 22 April 1967 (age 59) Blanes, Catalonia, Spain
- Party: People's Party of Catalonia
- Occupation: Lawyer

Alicia Sánchez-Camacho Pérez (born 22 April 1967) is a Spanish lawyer and politician. She served as the President of the People's Party in Catalonia from 2008 to 2017.

Sánchez-Camacho was born to Manchego and Extremaduran parents in Blanes. Her father was a Guardia Civil officer.

Sánchez-Camacho was elected as a deputy for the Province of Girona in the Catalan parliamentary elections of 1999 and 2003. She was also elected as the Deputy for Barcelona Province in the Spanish general election of 2004. On 16 April 2008, Sánchez-Camacho was appointed by the Parliament of Catalonia to replace Daniel Sirera as one of its eight representatives in the Spanish Senate.

Following the People's Party's poor performance in Catalonia at the 2008 Spanish general election, Daniel Sirera reluctantly resigned as its regional chairman under pressure from the party's national leader, Mariano Rajoy. Sánchez-Camacho was Rajoy's chosen candidate for the regional chairmanship. She was challenged by Montserrat Nebrera, who ran on a more liberal-minded platform. Despite having the backing of the national leadership, Sánchez-Camacho polled a lower-than-expected 56% in winning the run-off election.

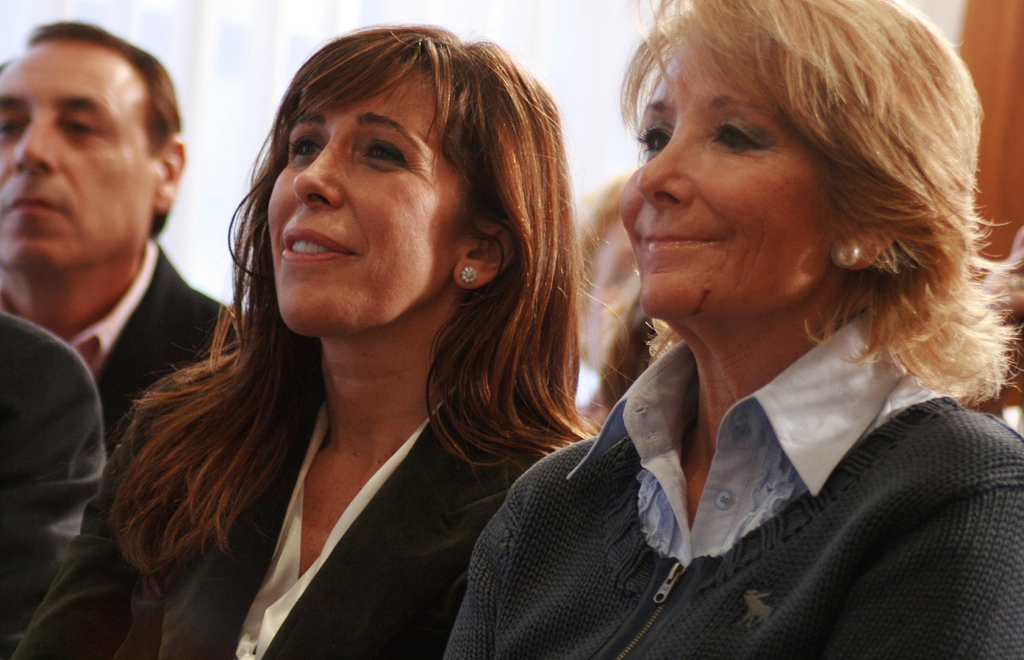
Alicia Sánchez-Camacho and Esperanza Aguirre in 2010

Ahead of the 2010 Catalan parliamentary election, Sánchez-Camacho took the unusual step in Spanish politics of setting up the country's tolerance of high immigration as a key campaign topic. Again, in 2013 and 2017, she was involved in the "Camargate" case, where she recorded a conversation with the objective of incriminating Catalan sovereignist parties and politicians in 2010.

== Controversies ==
=== Xenophobic content ===
In April 2010, Alicia Sánchez-Camacho was forced to apologize publicly for a diptych with radical xenophobic content with allusions to the skinheads of the city of Badalona, edited by the PP of Badalona (Barcelona), which linked Romanian citizens settled in the municipality with crime and the need for radical population increase to eradicate this "plague". The national leadership of his party had rejected the message the previous day after his complaint by the media. Subsequently, he visited the municipality accompanied by the French MEP Marie Thérèse Sanchez-Schmid to check on the ground the situation of the Romanian Gypsy community in the neighborhoods of La Salut and Sant Roc and hear the testimonies of the neighbors about the alleged bad coexistence with the Romanian community. On that same visit, Sánchez-Camacho asked the government for more border control and defended a "legal and orderly" immigration.

=== Camargate ===
In June 2013, a four-minutes conversation, referred to by the media as Camargate, was made public, held with María Victoria "Vicky" Álvarez (former sentimental partner of Jordi Pujol Ferrusola, Jordi Pujol's son) in the restaurant La Camarga, in L'Eixample of Barcelona, carried out by the Detective Agency Método 3, whose total duration was later uncovered by the Diario Público. The objective of the recording, whose participation Sánchez-Camacho strongly denied at the time, was to launch the so-called "Operation Catalonia", a political plot led by the PP against Catalan sovereignist parties and politicians. Declaring that the Pujol family had a fortune in Andorra would, according to Sanchez-Camacho, later "start Jordi Pujol Ferrusola's imputation". Denying his relationship with the case implied that he loaned false testimony before a judicial declaration and the commission of investigation of the Parlament de Catalunya.

The recording took place on July 7, 2010, and its duration was 2 hours and 22 minutes. First, the employee of Método 3 Alejandro Borreguero came to the restaurant with a vase of flowers that had a built-in microphone inside, and that would serve as a centerpiece. The recordings, which had already begun when the employee entered the restaurant shortly before 2:00 p.m., confirmed a conversation between the agent and a manager in which the assignment of Sánchez-Camacho was alluded to. In addition, he stated that Método 3 would take over the price of the meal. During the recording of the meal, which began after the technician left the restaurant, Sánchez-Camacho declared "Vicky, in the event that we could now do something with all of this, this meal has never happened.", " I have very good contacts inside the police [...] and I knew who they were going to arrest " and, especially, "I have a public prosecutor of my trust". Later, Sánchez-Camacho delivered a report with the results of the recording to the Ministry of the Interior, whose president Jorge Fernández Díaz would later also be involved in the "Operation Catalonia ".
