= Catalan Solidarity for Independence =

Catalan Solidarity for Independence Solidaritat Catalana per la Independència
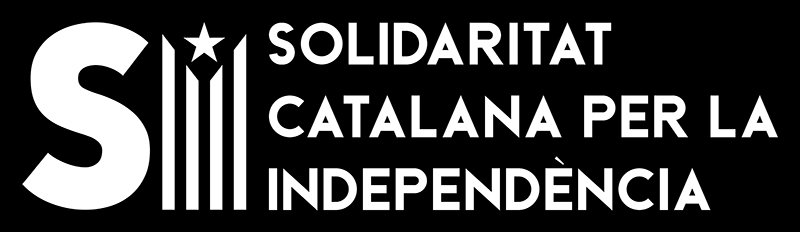
- Leader: Roger San Millán
- Founded: 20 July 2010
- Headquarters: Barcelona
- Ideology: Catalan independentism
- Colours: Black; White
- Slogan: Let's make independence possible
- Parliament of Catalonia: 0 / 135
- Municipalities: 0 / 9,137

Website
- solidaritat.cat

Catalan Solidarity for Independence (Catalan: Solidaritat Catalana per la Independència, SI; IPA: [suliðəɾiˈtat kətəˈlanə pəɾ ləjndəpənˈdɛnsi.ə]) is an electoral coalition in Catalonia, founded in the summer of 2010 as an outcome of the grassroots social movement that initiated and organized the Catalan independence referendums of 2009 and 2010. It was organized as a common political platform for Catalan independentism, dissatisfied with what they considered a pragmatist and conformist policy of other Catalan parties (including the independentist Esquerra Republicana de Catalunya) towards the issue of independence.

== History ==
It was formed on 20 July 2010 by former FC Barcelona president Joan Laporta, the jurist Alfons López Tena (former activist of the Democratic Convergence of Catalonia) and the Catalan MP Uriel Bertran (former ERC member) as an umbrella group for various supporters of Catalan independence and the creation of a sovereign state for Catalonia. It was named after Catalan Solidarity, a political coalition of all pro-Catalan parties which existed between 1906 and 1909.

Catalan Solidarity for Independence was formed as an electoral coalition of six political parties (Catalan Democracy, Solidarity for Independence, Catalan Republican Party, The Greens–Green Alternative, Catalunya Nació Independència and Socialist Party of National Liberation) to stand for the 2010 Catalan regional election. Negotiations to incorporate the group Realignment for Independence failed due to a disagreement regarding the compilation of electoral list, and divergence in both tactical and strategic considerations. Its slogans are: "Catalonia the next state of Europe" and "Let's make independence possible". Various public figures supported the movement, for example Hèctor López Bofill, Toni Strubell, Isabel-Clara Simó, Carles Solà and Josep Guia.

In the 2010 Catalan regional election, it won 3.28% of the vote and 4 deputies in the Parliament of Catalonia, among them the three co-founders. Three were elected in the constituency of Barcelona, and one in the constituency of Girona. In 2011, the party's co-founder Joan Laporta left the group. The new party leader was Alfons López Tena.

== See also ==
- Anna Arqué i Solsona
