= Flors Sirera =

Spanish nurse and aid worker

- Born: Flors Sirera i Fortuny; 25 April 1963; Tremp, Spain
- Died: 18 January 1997 (aged 33); Ruhengeri, Rwanda
- Cause of death: Gunshot
- Occupations: Nurse, aid worker
- Organization: Médecins du Monde

Flors Sirera i Fortuny (25 April 1963 – 18 January 1997) was a Spanish nurse and aid worker for Médecins du Monde murdered in Rwanda by the Rwandan Patriotic Front (RPF) along with two of her colleagues, doctor Manuel Madrazo and photographer Luis Valtueña. The killings coincided with the start of trials related to the 1994 Rwandan genocide.

== Biography ==
Flors Sirera was born in Tremp and lived in Las Palmas where she worked as a nurse at the Escaleritas Health Center. In 1994, she worked at the Mugunga refugee camp, east of Zaire. She was selected by Médecins du Monde, a non-governmental organization, to work in Rwanda due to her high professional qualifications and her previous aid experience. She moved to the African Great Lakes area in November 1996 to participate in an emergency action. She worked alongside doctor Manuel Madrazo from Seville and photographer Luis Valtueña from Madrid. After completing the mission, she asked to stay in the area to work on a project to assist small hospitals in Africa, and specifically in Rwanda, a country that was in a difficult political and social situation. Trials had just begun for crimes committed during the Rwandan genocide. In early 1997 the country was also still immersed in the First Congo War and gave support to the forces of Laurent-Désiré Kabila.

== Killing ==
During the night of 18 January 1997, newly installed in a new house in Ruhengeri in northwest Rwanda, next to the border with Zaire and Uganda, Flors Sirera, Manuel Madrazo, and Luis Valtueña (who worked as manager of administration and logistics), were shot dead. An undetermined number of Rwandans also died in the attack. Socorro Avedillo, the fourth member of the Spanish team, survived because she was in Goma, Zaire.

== Honors and tributes ==
In October 1997, the singer Dyango released a new album in collaboration with the tenor Giacomo Aragall, with the song "Quan l'amor és tan gran" (When Love is So Great) in tribute to the slain aid worker.

In 2003, a Manresa-based organization dedicated to solidarity projects was created, called Casa para la Solidaridad y la Paz Flors Sirera (Flors Sirera House for Solidarity and Peace). This organization aims to promote the culture of peace, and is a meeting space for the city's solidarity projects.

In 2005 the Tremp City Council named a public park in her honor.

In April 2007, Manresa paid tribute to Sirera with the participation of the director of the Hôtel des Mille Collines in Kigali, Paul Rusesabagina, who saved thousands of Rwandans from genocide and inspired the 2004 film Hotel Rwanda.

In 2015, Flors Sirera's family was presented with the Santi Vidal Award from the Manresa Red Cross, given to individuals and entities for their experience in the field of solidarity.

== Luis Valtueña International Humanitarian Photography Award ==
Since 1997, the NGO Medicos del Mundo (Spanish arm of Médecins du Monde) has annually convened the Luis Valtueña International Humanitarian Photography Award as a tribute to the memory of Luis Valtueña, Manuel Madrazo, and Flors Sirera, assassinated in Rwanda in 1997, and Mercedes Navarro, an aid worker assassinated in Bosnia in 1995.
