= Joan Herrera i Torres =

Spanish lawyer and politician

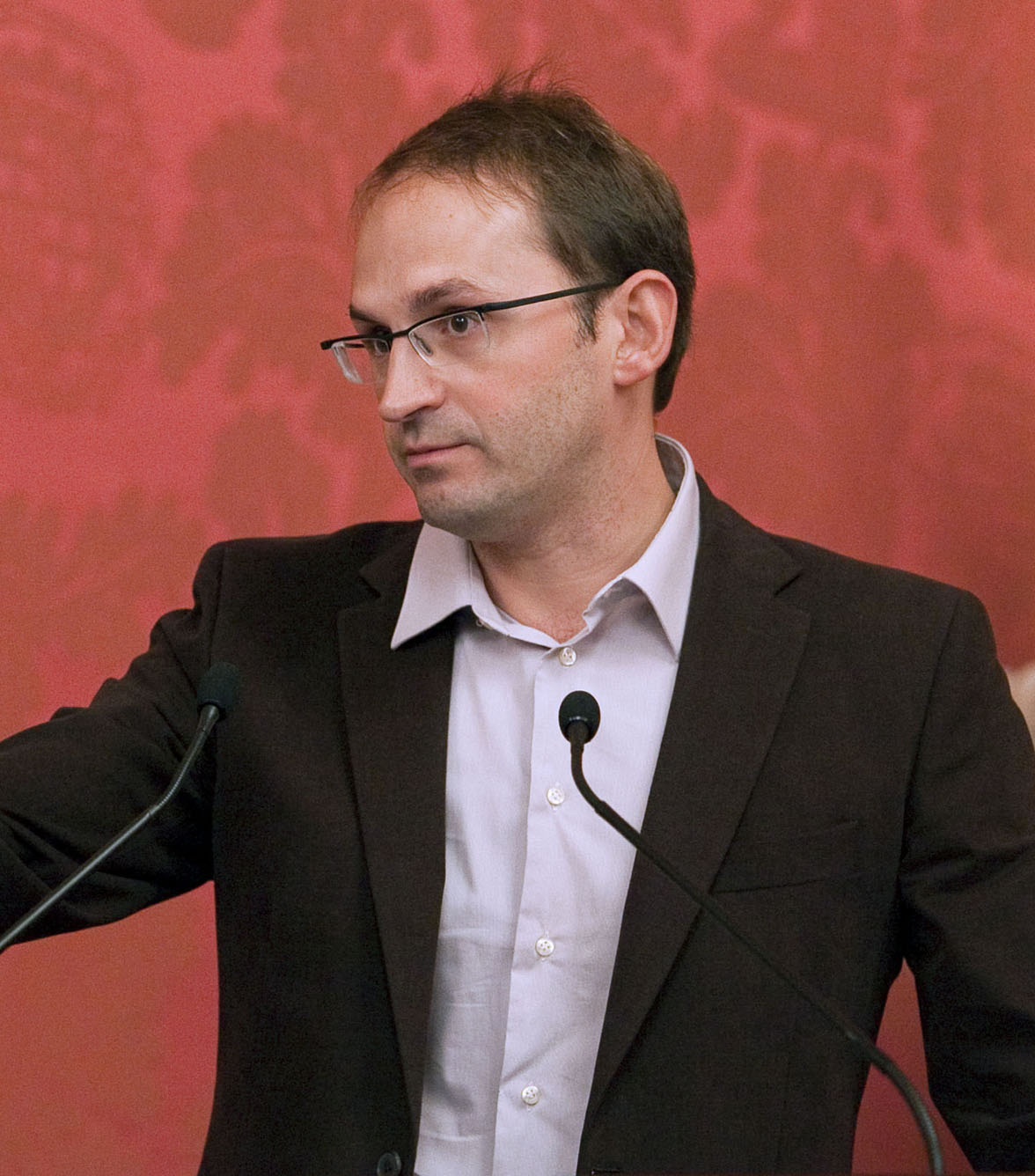
Joan Herrera (Barcelona, (2010).

Joan Herrera i Torres (Barcelona, Spain, 29 January 1971) is a Spanish lawyer and politician from Catalonia. He was the leader of the leftist party Iniciativa per Catalunya.

== Education ==
Herrera gained a law degree from the University of Barcelona, and specialises in issues of law and urban environment law, with a postgraduate degree at the Universitat Pompeu Fabra.

== Political career ==
He began his political activism in the grouping Youth with Initiative (JIC) in the Barcelona district of Sant Martí. In 1996, he began his career in politics when he was elected National Coordinator of JIC, a position he held until 2000. Under his leadership the youth organization was defined as eco-socialist, a definition later used by the grouping Initiative for Catalonia Greens (ICV) which Herrera joined.

As a member of ICV, he was responsible for the social movements of the party and coordinated, among others, the "No to War" campaign against the Iraq war for ICV in 2002 and 2003.

On 14 March 2004, he was elected to the Spanish Congress of Deputies representing Barcelona Province as head of the ICV list and was re-elected at the subsequent election in March 2008. He was endorsed by Montserrat Gibert, the longtime mayor of Sant Boi de Llobregat, one of Barcelona's largest suburbs, as part of his "eco-socialist" coalition.

In January 2007, he was elected vice-president of ICV. Since the ninth meeting of ICV, held in Sabadell in November 2008, is secretary general of the group.

In 2009, he sought to publicly condemn Pope Benedict XVI for having argued that condoms may in fact do more harm than good in the fight against AIDS.
