= 2010 Catalan regional election =

Election in the Spanish region of Catalonia

- 28 November 2010

All 135 seats in the Parliament of Catalonia 68 seats needed for a majority
- Opinion polls
- Registered: 5,363,688 ▲0.8%
- Turnout: 3,152,630 (58.8%) ▲2.8 pp
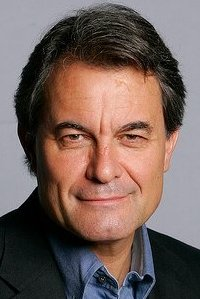

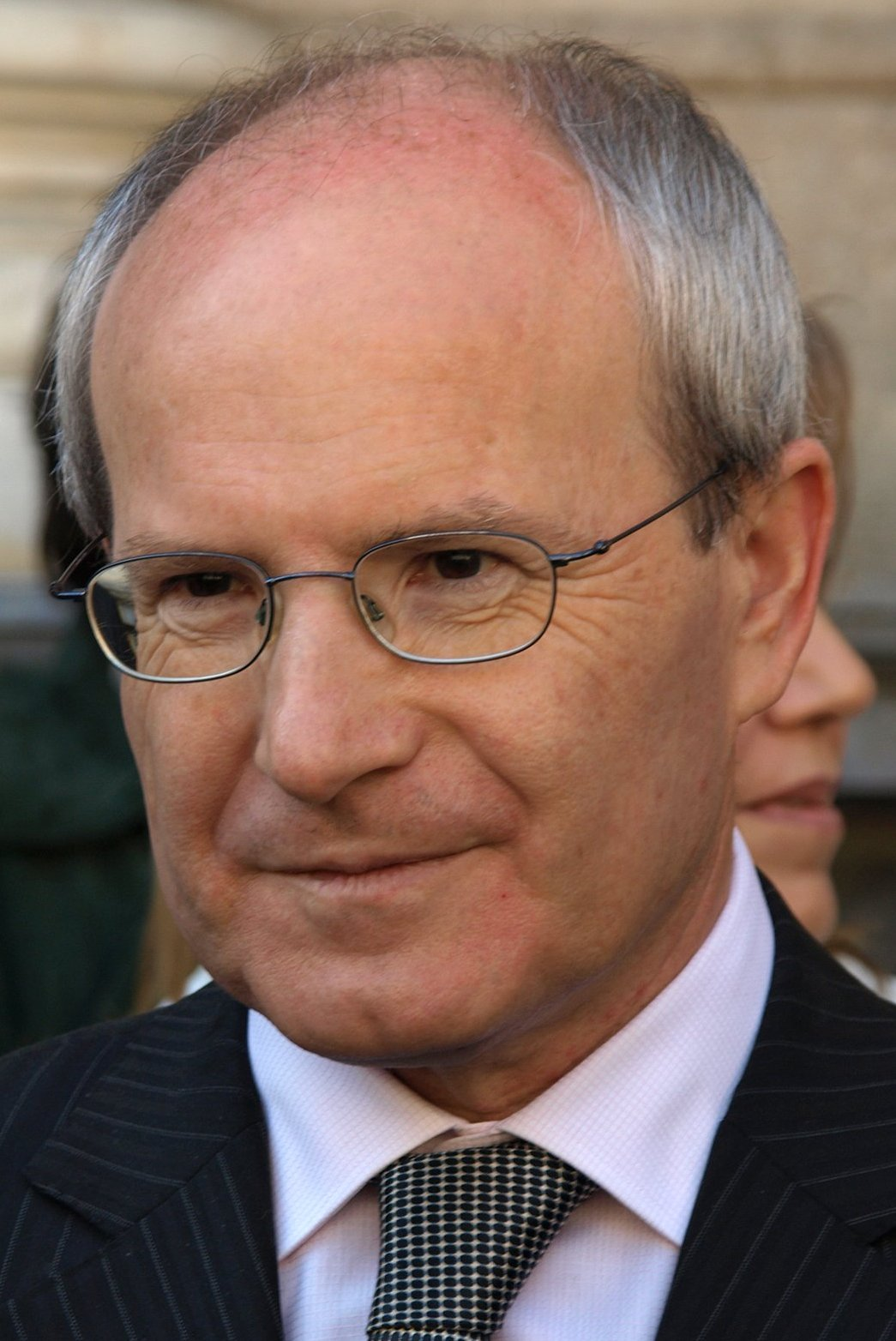

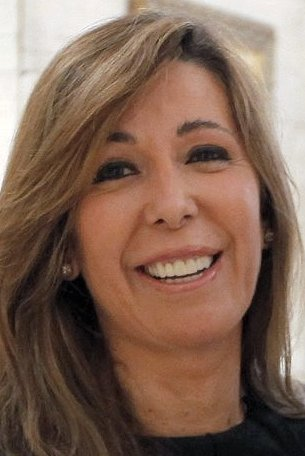

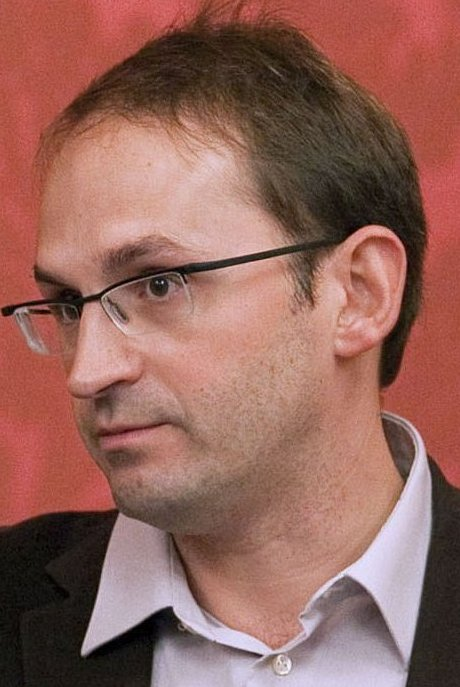

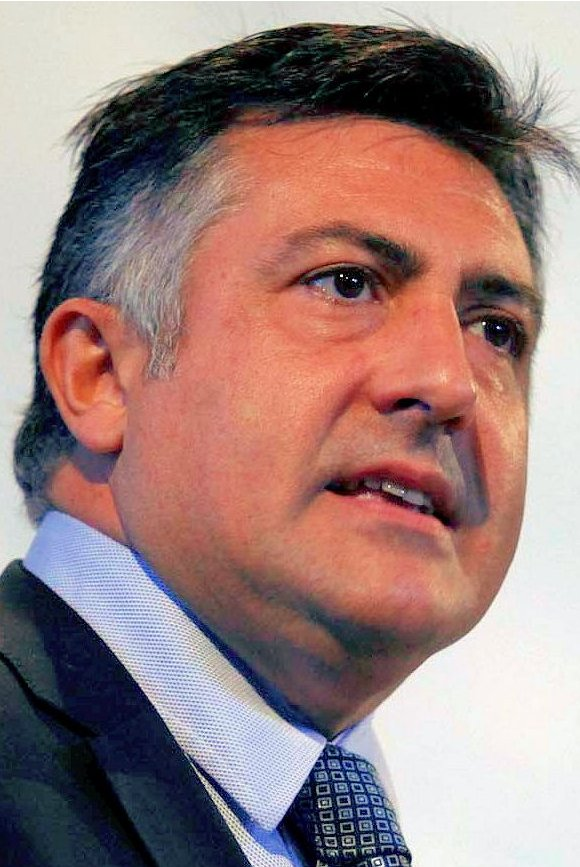

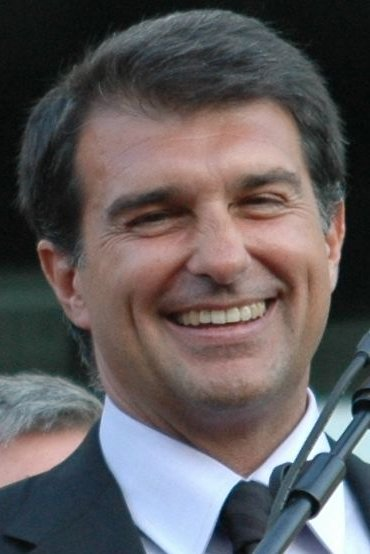

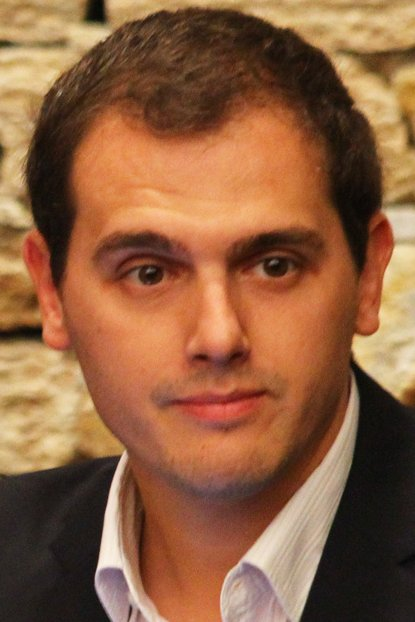
	First party	Second party	Third party
Leader	Artur Mas	José Montilla	Alicia Sánchez-Camacho
Party	CiU	PSC–PSOE	PP
Leader since	7 January 2002	15 July 2006	6 July 2008
Leader's seat	Barcelona	Barcelona	Barcelona
Last election	48 seats, 31.5%	37 seats, 26.8%	14 seats, 10.7%
Seats won	62	28	18
Seat change	▲14	▼9	▲4
Popular vote	1,202,830	575,233	387,066
Percentage	38.4%	18.4%	12.4%
Swing	▲6.9 pp	▼8.4 pp	▲1.7 pp
	Fourth party	Fifth party	Sixth party
Leader	Joan Herrera	Joan Puigcercós	Joan Laporta
Party	ICV–EUiA	ERC	SI
Leader since	23 November 2008	7 June 2008	4 September 2010
Leader's seat	Barcelona	Barcelona	Barcelona
Last election	12 seats, 9.5%	21 seats, 14.0%	Did not contest
Seats won	10	10	4
Seat change	▼2	▼11	▲4
Popular vote	230,824	219,173	102,921
Percentage	7.4%	7.0%	3.3%
Swing	▼2.1 pp	▼7.0 pp	New party
	Seventh party
Leader	Albert Rivera
Party	C's
Leader since	9 July 2006
Leader's seat	Barcelona
Last election	3 seats, 3.0%
Seats won	3
Seat change	0
Popular vote	106,154
Percentage	3.4%
Swing	▲0.4 pp
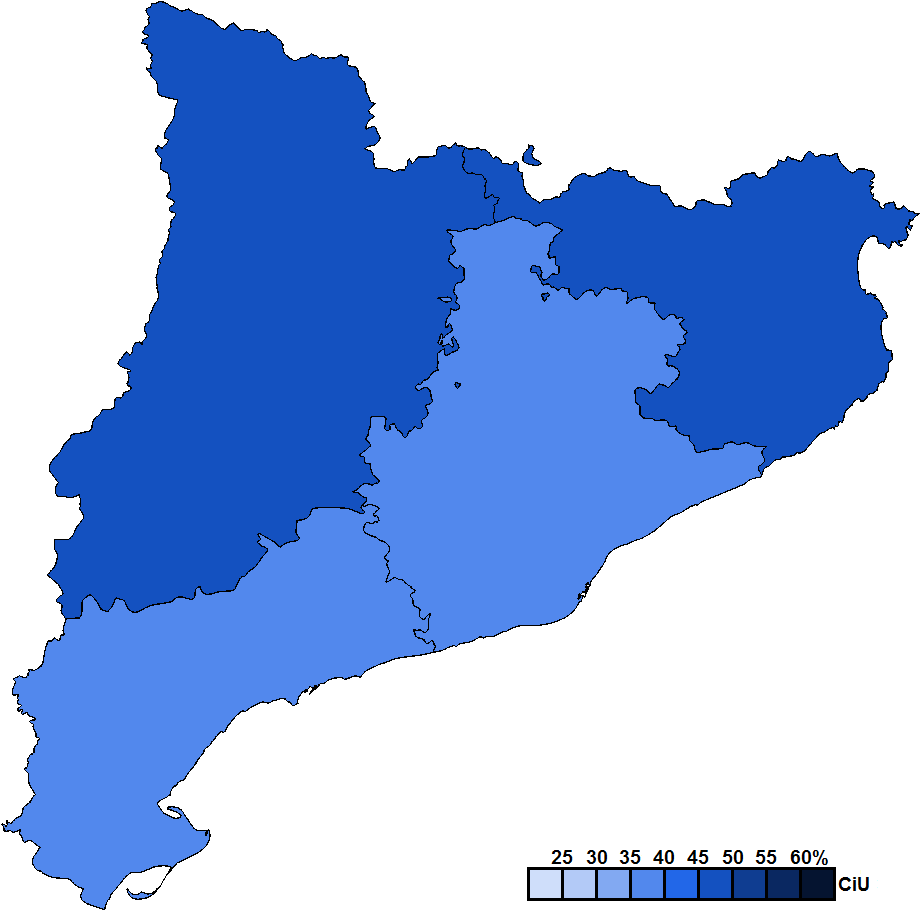
President before election
José Montilla
PSC
President after election
Artur Mas
CiU

A regional election was held in Catalonia on 28 November 2010 to elect the 9th Parliament of the autonomous community. All 135 seats in the Parliament were up for election. This was the first election held in Catalonia after the Constitutional Court of Spain struck down parts of the regional 2006 Statute of Autonomy that granted new powers of self-rule to the region. The ruling came after four years of deliberation concerning a constitutional appeal filed by the conservative People's Party (PP) under Mariano Rajoy and was met with anger and street protests throughout the region.

The election resulted in a resounding victory for the Convergence and Union (CiU) federation under Artur Mas, whose 62 seats—six short of an absolute majority—virtually ensured that no alternative government was mathematically possible, as the left-wing alliance which had formed the government of Catalonia for the previous seven years fell to a bare 48 seats. The tripartit (English: tripartite) coalition formed by the Socialists' Party of Catalonia (PSC), Republican Left of Catalonia (ERC) and Initiative for Catalonia Greens (ICV) was already at the brink of split going into the election, with political disagreements between the former allies having led Catalan president José Montilla to announce that he would not seek a third alliance with ERC and ICV even if election numbers favored such a possibility. The election saw a collapse in support for all three parties and Montilla's retirement from the PSC leadership shortly afterwards.

The PP had one of its best showings in a Catalan regional election, with 12.4% of the vote and 18 seats. Albert Rivera's Citizens (C's) party saw a slight increase in its vote share, whereas the pro-Catalan independence Catalan Solidarity for Independence (SI) led by former FC Barcelona president Joan Laporta secured 4 seats in the Parliament.

== Overview ==
Under the 2006 Statute of Autonomy, the Parliament of Catalonia was the unicameral legislature of the homonymous autonomous community, having legislative power in devolved matters, as well as the ability to grant or withdraw confidence from a regional president. The electoral and procedural rules were supplemented by national law provisions.

=== Date ===
The term of the Parliament of Catalonia expired four years after the date of its previous election, unless it was dissolved earlier. The election was required to be called no later than 15 days before the scheduled expiration date of parliament, with election day taking place between 40 and 60 days from the call. The previous election was held on 1 November 2006, which meant that the chamber's term would have expired on 1 November 2010. The election was required to be called no later than 17 October 2010, setting the latest possible date for election day on 16 December 2010.

The regional president had the prerogative to dissolve the Parliament of Catalonia at any given time and call a snap election, provided that no motion of no confidence was in process and that dissolution did not occur before one year after a previous one under this procedure. In the event of an investiture process failing to elect a regional president within a two-month period from the first ballot, the Parliament was to be automatically dissolved and a fresh election called.

The Parliament of Catalonia was officially dissolved on 5 October 2010 with the publication of the corresponding decree in the Official Journal of the Government of Catalonia (DOGC), setting election day for 28 November.

=== Electoral system ===
Voting for the Parliament was based on universal suffrage, comprising all Spanish nationals over 18 years of age, registered in Catalonia and with full political rights, provided that they had not been deprived of the right to vote by a final sentence, nor were legally incapacitated.

The Parliament of Catalonia had a minimum of 100 and a maximum of 150 seats, with electoral provisions fixing its size at 135. All were elected in four multi-member constituencies—corresponding to the provinces of Barcelona, Girona, Lleida and Tarragona, each of which was assigned a fixed number of seats—using the D'Hondt method and closed-list proportional voting, with a three percent-threshold of valid votes (including blank ballots) in each constituency. The use of this electoral method resulted in a higher effective threshold depending on district magnitude and vote distribution.

As a result of the aforementioned allocation, each Parliament constituency was entitled the following seats:

Seats	Constituencies
85	Barcelona
18	Tarragona
17	Girona
15	Lleida

The law did not provide for by-elections to fill vacant seats; instead, any vacancies arising after the proclamation of candidates and during the legislative term were filled by the next candidates on the party lists or, when required, by designated substitutes.

=== Outgoing parliament ===
The table below shows the composition of the parliamentary groups in the chamber at the time of dissolution.

Parliamentary composition in October 2010
Groups	Parties	Legislators	
Groups	Parties	Seats	Total
Convergence and Union's Parliamentary Group	CDC	34	48
Convergence and Union's Parliamentary Group	UDC	14	48
Socialists–Citizens for Change Parliamentary Group	PSC	32	37
Socialists–Citizens for Change Parliamentary Group	CpC	5	37
Republican Left of Catalonia's Parliamentary Group	ERC	21	21
People's Party of Catalonia's Parliamentary Group	PP	14	14
Initiative for Catalonia Greens–United and Alternative Left's Parliamentary Group	ICV	10	12
Initiative for Catalonia Greens–United and Alternative Left's Parliamentary Group	EUiA	2	12
Mixed Group	C's	2	2
Non-Inscrits	INDEP	1 (Note: José Domingo, former Cs legislator.)	1

== Parties and candidates ==
The electoral law allowed for parties and federations registered in the interior ministry, alliances and groupings of electors to present lists of candidates. Parties and federations intending to form an alliance were required to inform the relevant electoral commission within 10 days of the election call, whereas groupings of electors needed to secure the signature of at least one percent of the electorate in the constituencies for which they sought election, disallowing electors from signing for more than one list. Amendments in 2007 required a balanced composition of men and women in the electoral lists, so that candidates of either sex made up at least 40 percent of the total composition.

Below is a list of the main parties and alliances which contested the election:

Candidacy	Parties and alliances	Leading candidate	Ideology	Previous result		Gov.	Ref.
Candidacy	Parties and alliances	Leading candidate	Ideology	Vote %	Seats	Gov.	Ref.
CiU	List: Convergence and Union (CiU) – Democratic Convergence of Catalonia (CDC) – Democratic Union of Catalonia (UDC)	Artur Mas	Catalan nationalism Centrism	31.5%	48	No	
PSC–PSOE	List: Socialists' Party of Catalonia (PSC–PSOE)	José Montilla	Social democracy	26.8%	37	Yes	
ERC	List: Republican Left of Catalonia (ERC)	Joan Puigcercós	Catalan independence Left-wing nationalism Social democracy	14.0%	21	Yes	
PP	List: People's Party (PP)	Alicia Sánchez-Camacho	Conservatism; Christian democracy	10.7%	14	No	
ICV–EUiA	List: Initiative for Catalonia Greens (ICV); United and Alternative Left (EUiA) – Party of the Communists of Catalonia (PCC) – Living Unified Socialist Party of Catalonia (PSUC viu) – Revolutionary Workers' Party (POR)	Joan Herrera	Regionalism; Eco-socialism; Green politics	9.5%	12	Yes	
C's	List: Citizens–Party of the Citizenry (C's)	Albert Rivera	Social liberalism	3.0%	3	No	
SI	List: Catalan Solidarity for Independence (SI)	Joan Laporta	Catalan independence	Did not contest		No	

== Opinion polls ==
The tables below list opinion polling results in reverse chronological order, showing the most recent first and using the dates when the survey fieldwork was done, as opposed to the date of publication. Where the fieldwork dates are unknown, the date of publication is given instead. The highest percentage figure in each polling survey is displayed with its background shaded in the leading party's colour. If a tie ensues, this is applied to the figures with the highest percentages. The "Lead" column on the right shows the percentage-point difference between the parties with the highest percentages in a poll.

=== Graphical summary ===
Local regression trend line of poll results from 1 November 2006 to 28 November 2010, with each line corresponding to a political party.

=== Voting intention estimates ===
The table below lists weighted voting intention estimates. Refusals are generally excluded from the party vote percentages, while question wording and the treatment of "don't know" responses and those not intending to vote may vary between polling organisations. When available, seat projections determined by the polling organisations are displayed below (or in place of) the percentages in a smaller font; 68 seats were required for an absolute majority in the Parliament of Catalonia.

Color key:

Poll conducted after legal ban on opinion polls Exit poll

Polling firm/Commissioner	Fieldwork date	Sample size	Turnout	CiU	PSC	ERC	PP	ICV–EUiA	C's	PxC	UPyD	RI.cat	SI	Lead
2010 regional election	28 Nov 2010	—N/a	58.8	38.4; 62	18.4; 28	7.0; 10	12.4; 18	7.4; 10	3.4; 3	2.4; 0	0.2; 0	1.3; 0	3.3; 4	20.0
Ipsos–Eco/CCMA	28 Nov 2010	?	?	40.2; 63/66	17.3; 24/27	8.1; 11/13	11.1; 15/17	7.3; 8/10	3.2; 2/3	–	–	1.5; 0/1	3.7; 3/4	22.9
GESOP/El Periòdic	25–27 Nov 2010	900	56–58	40.0; 65/67	18.5; 27/28	7.4; 10/12	10.5; 14/15	10.2; 12/14	4.0; 4	–	–	–	2.8; 0/2	21.5
GESOP/El Periòdic	24–26 Nov 2010	900	54–56	39.2; 64/66	19.3; 29/30	7.2; 10/12	10.4; 14/15	9.9; 12/13	3.7; 3/4	–	–	–	2.6; 0	19.9
GAD/COPE	22–26 Nov 2010	2,201	59.2	39.4; 60/63	20.5; 29/31	7.7; 11/12	11.6; 15/16	9.4; 11/13	4.0; 3/4	–	–	–	2.9; 0/3	18.9
GESOP/El Periòdic	23–25 Nov 2010	900	54–56	39.9; 65/67	19.5; 29/30	7.0; 10/11	9.9; 13/14	9.5; 11/13	3.7; 3/4	–	–	–	2.6; 0	20.4
GESOP/El Periòdic	22–24 Nov 2010	800	54–56	39.5; 64/65	20.1; 29/31	7.3; 10/12	9.8; 13/14	9.0; 11/12	4.3; 4/5	–	–	–	2.5; 0	19.4
GESOP/El Periòdic	20–23 Nov 2010	700	53–55	39.5; 64/65	20.1; 29/31	7.3; 10/12	10.1; 13/14	8.4; 10/12	4.4; 4/5	–	–	–	2.9; 0/2	19.4
GESOP/El Periòdic	20–22 Nov 2010	600	52–54	39.2; 63/64	19.9; 29/30	7.5; 11/12	10.1; 13/14	8.2; 10/11	4.7; 5	–	–	–	3.2; 0/4	19.3
GESOP/El Periódico	20–21 Nov 2010	400	51–53	39.1; 63/64	20.0; 30	7.5; 11	10.3; 14	8.0; 10/11	4.3; 4/5	–	–	–	3.2; 0/4	19.1
Obradoiro de Socioloxía/Público	15–20 Nov 2010	2,500	60	39.3; 62	22.2; 33	9.1; 13	8.5; 12	8.0; 10	4.1; 4	1.0; 0	0.4; 0	1.1; 0	2.9; 1	17.1
TNS Demoscopia/Antena 3	19 Nov 2010	?	50.2	38.5; 59/60	21.6; 30/32	? 10/11	? 15/16	? 11/12	? 4	–	–	–	? 3	16.9
NC Report/La Razón	15–18 Nov 2010	1,000	53.9	39.4; 60/62	21.8; 31/32	9.3; 13/14	11.4; 15/16	8.5; 11/12	3.2; 2/3	–	–	–	1.8; 0	17.6
Sigma Dos/El Mundo	15–18 Nov 2010	1,650	?	40.4; 61/64	21.8; 30/32	8.1; 11	12.7; 17/19	8.1; 9/10	3.0; 3	–	–	–	–	18.6
Noxa/La Vanguardia	15–18 Nov 2010	1,200	?	39.3; 63/65	20.1; 31/32	7.9; 10/12	10.1; 14	7.5; 9/10	4.0; 4	–	–	–	2.4; 0/1	19.2
DYM/ABC	11–18 Nov 2010	1,141	52.3	40.0; 60/62	21.7; 31	6.6; 11	11.3; 15/16	10.0; 12/13	4.6; 5	–	–	–	1.8; 0/1	18.3
Metroscopia/El País	16–17 Nov 2010	1,508	50–52	39.5; 64/65	20.4; 30	7.0; 8/9	9.5; 13/14	6.9; 10	5.0; 6/7	–	–	–	2.6; 1/3	19.1
La Vanguardia	12 Nov 2010	?	?	40.6; 63/65	19.2; 27/28	9.2; 13	11.9; 15/16	8.4; 11/12	3.5; 3	–	–	–	2.9; 0/3	21.4
Feedback/RAC 1	8–12 Nov 2010	1,000	52.3	39.3; 62/63	20.1; 30/31	5.6; 10/11	10.5; 14/15	6.7; 9/10	3.2; 3	0.7; 0	–	1.7; 0/1	2.8; 2/4	19.2
GESOP/El Periódico	7–10 Nov 2010	800	?	39.0; 62/63	21.3; 31/32	7.7; 11/12	10.8; 14/15	9.0; 11/12	3.2; 3/4	–	–	–	2.7; 0/2	19.7
Opina/Cadena SER	8–9 Nov 2010	1,200	?	42.4; 65/66	18.4; 30/32	7.3; 10/11	11.6; 14/16	7.5; 7/8	4.1; 3	–	–	–	3.5; 2/3	24.0
CIS	15 Oct–4 Nov 2010	2,966	?	38.0; 59	22.7; 33	10.2; 15/16	9.7; 13/14	8.2; 11	3.5; 3	0.6; 0	0.1; 0	1.2; 0	1.0; 0	15.3
NC Report/La Razón	26–28 Oct 2010	1,000	53.5	41.0; 62/63	21.6; 30/31	8.8; 11/12	11.9; 15/16	10.1; 12/13	2.9; 2/3	–	–	–	–	19.4
TNS Demoscopia/Antena 3	24 Oct 2010	?	54.8	40.2	19.5	–	–	–	–	–	–	–	–	20.7
Feedback/RAC 1	18–22 Oct 2010	1,000	54.0	41.8; 65/66	19.5; 27/28	6.5; 11/12	8.6; 13	8.0; 9/11	3.8; 4	1.0; 0	–	1.5; 0	2.3; 0/4	22.3
GESOP/CEO	11–22 Oct 2010	2,000	58.3	37.0; 62/65	19.4; 29/30	8.6; 13/14	11.3; 16	7.2; 8/9	3.5; 4	–	–	–	2.0; 0	17.6
GESOP/El Periódico	26–28 Sep 2010	800	51–52	40.5; 63/65	20.8; 30/31	8.4; 12/13	10.4; 14/15	7.2; 9/10	2.9; 2/3	–	–	–	2.7; 0/2	19.7
Feedback/RAC 1	20–24 Sep 2010	1,000	55.3	41.2; 63/65	20.4; 30/31	8.0; 10/11	10.7; 15/16	7.3; 9/10	3.7; 3/4	–	–	1.0; 0	2.4; 0/3	20.8
TNS Demoscopia/SI	20–23 Sep 2010	1,201	54.2	34.6; 56/59	20.2; 30/32	6.9; 9/12	10.1; 13/15	9.3; 13/14	4.4; 4	0.8; 0	–	1.6; 0	5.6; 6/8	14.4
Metroscopia/El País	20–22 Sep 2010	1,200	50	40.7; 61	19.2; 28	9.2; 12	12.5; 17	7.6; 9	3.6; 4	–	–	2.6; 2	2.6; 2	21.5
Noxa/La Vanguardia	1–2 Sep 2010	800	?	38.9; 60/61	21.1; 31/32	10.1; 15/16	11.2; 15	9.2; 12	2.6; 0/3	–	–	2.6; 0/3	–	17.8
Noxa/La Vanguardia	12–14 Jul 2010	1,000	?	42.1; 65/66	23.1; 32/33	8.4; 13	10.3; 14	7.4; 10	2.4; 0	–	–	1.9; 0	–	19.0
GESOP/CEO	28 Jun–8 Jul 2010	2,000	53.9	40.5; 67/68	21.1; 31/32	8.7; 13	9.8; 13	7.4; 10	2.6; 0	–	–	0.9; 0	–	19.4
NC Report/La Razón	2–3 Jul 2010	1,000	53.8	40.4; 60/61	22.2; 32/33	9.2; 12/13	11.6; 15/16	10.5; 13/14	2.8; 0	–	–	–	–	18.2
Metroscopia/El País	1 Jul 2010	302	?	39.0	24.7	7.5	–	–	–	–	–	–	–	14.3
GESOP/El Periódico	10–11 Jun 2010	800	?	41.0; 65/67	21.0; 30/32	8.5; 12/13	10.0; 13/14	8.5; 10/12	1.2; 0	0.5; 0	–	1.3; 0	–	20.0
Sigma Dos/El Mundo	24–26 May 2010	1,000	?	36.1; 57/59	24.8; 35/38	9.5; 12/15	14.8; 20/22	5.7; 5/7	–	–	–	–	–	11.3
Noxa/La Vanguardia	10–13 May 2010	1,000	?	41.1; 63/64	23.5; 33/34	8.7; 13	10.5; 14	8.5; 11	1.4; 0	–	–	0.9; 0	–	17.6
GESOP/CEO	16–30 Apr 2010	2,000	56.8	39.6; 65	23.2; 36	8.8; 13	8.5; 12	7.7; 9	1.8; 0	–	–	1.4; 0	–	16.4
Obradoiro de Socioloxía/Público	7–16 Apr 2010	2,500	?	38.8; 58/60	28.2; 41/43	9.0; 13	7.2; 10	7.7; 10/11	1.9; 0	0.7; 0	0.8; 0	1.2; 0	–	10.6
TNS Demoscopia/Antena 3	22–23 Mar 2010	1,100	49.5	40.5; 61/62	23.9; 35/36	10.3; 13/14	9.3; 12/13	9.2; 11/12	1.8; 0	–	–	2.1; 0	–	16.6
GESOP/El Periódico	15–18 Mar 2010	?	?	38.7; 61/63	23.0; 34/36	8.4; 12/13	9.8; 13/14	8.3; 11/12	1.5; 0	–	–	1.0; 0	–	15.7
GAD/COPE	9–15 Mar 2010	1,000	60	39.0; 59	23.5; 35	9.4; 13	12.7; 16	8.8; 12	2.1; 0	–	–	–	–	15.5
Noxa/La Vanguardia	8–10 Mar 2010	1,000	?	43.9; 65/67	23.9; 32/33	7.7; 11/12	10.4; 13/14	9.2; 11/12	0.1; 0	–	–	1.8; 0	–	20.0
GESOP/CEO	13–28 Jan 2010	2,000	56.9	35.6; 58	24.7; 38	9.8; 15	9.7; 13	8.5; 10	2.1; 0	–	–	1.2; 1	–	10.9
Opina/CEO	2–13 Nov 2009	2,000	56.8	33.4; 55/57	23.1; 36/38	10.1; 17	10.3; 15	6.8; 10	1.7; 0	–	–	1.4; 0	–	10.3
GESOP/El Periódico	26–28 Oct 2009	800	?	35.1; 55/57	25.1; 36/38	10.8; 16/17	9.4; 12/14	10.1; 13/14	1.2; 0	–	–	1.3; 0	–	10.0
Noxa/La Vanguardia	22–27 Oct 2009	1,000	?	36.2; 57/58	25.1; 35/36	9.5; 14/15	11.2; 15/16	8.5; 10/11	0.7; 0	–	–	2.8; 0/3	–	11.1
Obradoiro de Socioloxía/Público	1–4 Sep 2009	?	?	35.7; 53/54	30.8; 44/46	6.9; 11	10.8; 13/15	8.4; 11	1.6; 0	–	1.4; 0	–	–	4.9
GESOP/El Periódico	14–15 Jul 2009	600	?	34.4; 54/56	26.0; 37/39	11.0; 16/17	8.5; 12	10.0; 12/13	1.5; 0	–	–	–	–	8.4
Opina/CEO	29 Jun–10 Jul 2009	2,000	?	35.4; 54	25.5; 37	10.4; 15	11.3; 15	8.7; 11	2.6; 3	–	–	–	–	9.9
2009 EP election	7 Jun 2009	—N/a	36.9	22.4 (35)	36.0 (54)	9.2 (13)	18.0 (26)	6.1 (7)	0.4 (0)	–	0.8 (0)	–	–	13.6
Opina/CEO	20–30 Apr 2009	2,000	?	38.5; 59	23.0; 34	12.2; 17	10.5; 14	7.9; 11	2.6; 0	–	–	–	–	15.5
GESOP/El Periódico	9–11 Mar 2009	800	?	35.6; 55/56	26.5; 38/39	10.6; 15/16	8.8; 12/13	9.0; 11/12	2.5; 0/2	–	–	–	–	9.1
Opina/CEO	19–28 Jan 2009	2,000	?	34.5; 56	24.3; 35/36	12.3; 17/18	8.6; 12	9.2; 12	2.8; 2	–	–	–	–	10.2
Noxa/La Vanguardia	24–27 Nov 2008	600	?	34.8; 51/53	26.0; 36/37	13.7; 19/20	9.7; 12/13	9.2; 11/12	2.7; 0/3	–	–	–	–	8.8
GESOP/El Periódico	10–13 Nov 2008	800	?	34.2; 52/54	26.9; 38/39	13.9; 20/21	8.0; 10/11	9.0; 11/12	2.4; 0/2	–	–	–	–	7.3
Opina/CEO	20–28 Oct 2008	2,000	?	34.0; 52	25.6; 37	10.8; 16/17	12.2; 15/17	8.9; 12	1.9; 1/2	–	–	–	–	8.4
GESOP/El Periódico	1–2 Jul 2008	?	?	34.8; 52/53	27.3; 38/39	12.7; 17/18	9.0; 12/13	8.0; 10/11	3.1; 2/3	–	–	–	–	7.5
Opina/CEO	16 Jun–1 Jul 2008	2,000	?	34.7; 53	25.9; 38	12.7; 18	9.2; 13	8.8; 11	2.5; 2	–	–	–	–	8.8
Opina/CEO	14–25 Apr 2008	2,000	?	31.9; 48	29.6; 42	11.5; 17	10.4; 13	9.7; 12	3.0; 3	–	–	–	–	2.3
GESOP/El Periódico	22–24 Apr 2008	?	?	35.6; 53/55	28.4; 40/42	11.8; 17/18	8.5; 10/11	8.9; 11/12	2.1; 0	–	–	–	–	7.2
La Vanguardia	9 Mar 2008	?	70.3	30.4; 50	30.3; 45	9.8; 14	10.7; 15	8.0; 11	–	–	–	–	–	0.1
2008 general election	9 Mar 2008	—N/a	70.3	20.9 (31)	45.4 (65)	7.8 (12)	16.4 (22)	4.9 (5)	0.7 (0)	0.1 (0)	0.2 (0)	–	–	24.5
GESOP/El Periódico	8–11 Jan 2008	?	?	33.3; 51/52	27.0; 38/40	11.8; 18	10.4; 14	8.3; 11	2.4; 0/2	–	–	–	–	6.3
Noxa/La Vanguardia	22–25 Oct 2007	800	?	30.8; 46	28.9; 39	14.6; 22	10.6; 14	8.8; 11	3.5; 3	–	–	–	–	1.9
GESOP/El Periódico	14 Oct 2007	?	?	33.0; 51/52	27.0; 38/40	14.0; 21/22	9.5; 12/13	8.5; 10/11	2.0; 0	–	–	–	–	6.0
Opina/CEO	17–28 Sep 2007	2,200	?	30.4; 46/47	28.5; 42	13.3; 20	8.6; 11/12	10.2; 13	1.9; 0/2	–	–	–	–	1.9
Opina/CEO	18 Jun–2 Jul 2007	2,200	?	33.4; 50/51	27.0; 40	11.9; 17	9.0; 12	9.9; 12/13	3.6; 3	–	–	–	–	6.4
GESOP/El Periódico	25–27 Jun 2007	?	?	33.0; 51/53	27.0; 38/40	13.3; 19/20	9.5; 12/13	9.0; 11/12	2.5; 0/2	–	–	–	–	6.0
GESOP/El Periódico	15–17 Apr 2007	800	?	32.0; 49/50	28.6; 39/40	12.5; 18	9.8; 13	10.0; 13	2.7; 2	–	–	–	–	3.4
Opina/CEO	2–16 Mar 2007	2,200	?	29.8	27.6	13.8	10.2	10.2	3.5	–	–	–	–	2.2
GESOP/El Periódico	17–18 Jan 2007	800	?	31.1; 47/48	28.4; 39/40	12.2; 18	10.5; 14	9.9; 12	4.0; 4	–	–	–	–	2.7
DYM/CEO	6–20 Nov 2006	2,100	?	32.6	26.3	13.1	8.6	10.5	6.0	–	–	–	–	6.3
2006 regional election	1 Nov 2006	—N/a	56.0	31.5; 48	26.8; 37	14.0; 21	10.7; 14	9.5; 12	3.0; 3	–	–	–	–	4.7

=== Voting preferences ===
The table below lists raw, unweighted voting preferences.

Color key:

Poll conducted after legal ban on opinion polls

Polling firm/Commissioner	Fieldwork date	Sample size	CiU	PSC	ERC	PP	ICV–EUiA	C's	PxC	RI.cat	SI	Question	X mark	Lead
2010 regional election (Note: Does not include non-resident citizens.)	28 Nov 2010	—N/a	22.9	10.9	4.2	7.3	4.4	2.0	1.4	0.7	2.0	—N/a	40.1	12.0
GESOP/El Periòdic	25–27 Nov 2010	900	32.9	14.1	5.7	6.1	6.9	2.6	–	–	2.0	16.1	5.6	18.8
GESOP/El Periòdic	24–26 Nov 2010	900	30.8	14.9	5.2	6.0	7.2	2.2	–	–	1.9	16.0	6.3	15.9
GESOP/El Periòdic	23–25 Nov 2010	900	30.8	16.8	4.8	5.5	5.3	3.2	–	–	2.3	15.8	5.8	14.0
GESOP/El Periòdic	22–24 Nov 2010	800	30.8	16.3	4.8	5.6	6.8	2.3	–	–	2.1	13.7	7.0	14.5
GESOP/El Periòdic	20–23 Nov 2010	700	30.3	17.3	4.6	5.8	6.8	2.6	–	–	2.0	12.9	7.3	13.0
GESOP/El Periòdic	20–22 Nov 2010	600	32.0	18.3	4.4	5.9	5.3	2.9	–	–	2.3	12.8	6.0	13.7
GESOP/El Periódico	20–21 Nov 2010	400	29.8	16.0	4.8	5.8	4.8	2.8	–	–	3.0	16.5	4.3	13.8
Obradoiro de Socioloxía/Público	15–20 Nov 2010	2,500	25.7	12.8	4.8	4.9	4.0	1.9	0.7	0.5	1.6	–	–	12.9
Feedback/RAC 1	8–12 Nov 2010	1,000	25.5	13.3	5.4	3.5	3.0	1.1	0.4	0.6	1.3	26.3	10.0	12.2
CIS	15 Oct–4 Nov 2010	2,966	20.6	13.4	5.8	5.1	5.4	2.4	0.6	0.8	0.7	19.1	17.5	7.2
Feedback/RAC 1	18–22 Oct 2010	1,000	28.4	10.6	4.2	4.0	5.2	1.9	0.8	1.2	1.8	22.2	9.0	17.8
GESOP/CEO	11–22 Oct 2010	2,000	24.4	14.2	7.4	6.2	5.2	2.1	–	–	–	22.5	5.9	10.2
GESOP/ICPS	3–30 Sep 2010	2,000	22.3	21.5	6.4	4.4	4.7	1.1	0.1	1.0	1.4	15.7	16.0	0.8
GESOP/El Periódico	26–28 Sep 2010	800	29.5	15.9	5.8	4.3	2.9	1.5	–	1.4	1.9	21.2	7.0	13.6
GESOP/CEO	28 Jun–8 Jul 2010	2,000	25.3	14.2	6.0	3.8	5.6	1.0	–	–	–	28.3	7.0	11.1
Metroscopia/El País	1 Jul 2010	302	22.2	19.9	5.6	6.6	1.0	1.0	–	–	–	23.5	10.6	2.3
GESOP/El Periódico	10–11 Jun 2010	800	32.3	16.1	7.1	3.9	4.1	0.8	0.4	1.1	–	14.2	11.0	16.2
GESOP/CEO	16–30 Apr 2010	2,000	25.0	17.5	6.6	4.3	5.0	1.1	–	–	–	21.8	9.2	7.5
Obradoiro de Socioloxía/Público	7–16 Apr 2010	2,500	24.6	20.1	5.7	4.3	5.0	1.0	0.3	0.7	–	–	–	4.5
GESOP/El Periódico	15–18 Mar 2010	?	29.6	20.0	5.9	4.0	5.3	0.9	0.6	–	–	13.3	8.6	9.6
GESOP/CEO	13–28 Jan 2010	2,000	23.0	17.4	7.6	4.9	5.6	1.2	–	–	–	20.8	10.5	5.6
Opina/CEO	2–13 Nov 2009	2,000	21.8	15.7	8.1	4.8	5.0	0.8	–	–	–	15.9	13.9	6.1
GESOP/El Periódico	26–28 Oct 2009	800	25.3	22.9	8.3	4.6	5.9	0.6	–	–	–	13.3	11.5	2.4
GESOP/ICPS	28 Sep–19 Oct 2009	1,200	20.7	22.7	8.1	3.2	5.4	0.7	–	–	–	7.6	25.6	2.0
Obradoiro de Socioloxía/Público	1–4 Sep 2009	?	22.3	22.6	3.6	5.2	4.9	0.8	0.2	0.5	–	–	–	0.3
GESOP/El Periódico	14–15 Jul 2009	600	21.2	20.3	8.7	3.3	6.2	0.3	–	–	–	–	–	0.9
Opina/CEO	29 Jun–10 Jul 2009	2,000	23.8	18.0	8.4	3.9	6.9	1.1	–	–	–	23.3	8.6	5.8
2009 EP election	7 Jun 2009	—N/a	8.4	13.4	3.4	6.7	2.3	0.1	–	–	–	—N/a	62.5	5.0
Opina/CEO	20–30 Apr 2009	2,000	24.9	19.7	9.6	3.8	5.1	1.1	–	–	–	23.0	6.9	5.2
GESOP/El Periódico	9–11 Mar 2009	800	26.6	25.4	8.3	2.9	7.0	1.3	–	–	–	13.3	8.0	1.2
Opina/CEO	19–28 Jan 2009	2,000	21.4	21.0	9.8	3.7	5.9	1.3	–	–	–	18.3	9.7	0.4
GESOP/El Periódico	10–13 Nov 2008	800	25.8	27.9	10.4	3.6	5.0	0.8	–	–	–	12.8	8.4	2.1
GESOP/ICPS	20 Oct–12 Nov 2008	1,200	19.9	27.4	8.1	4.4	4.7	0.7	–	–	–	8.1	22.8	7.5
Opina/CEO	20–28 Oct 2008	2,000	21.2	21.6	7.9	5.2	7.1	0.7	–	–	–	20.7	9.9	0.4
GESOP/El Periódico	1–2 Jul 2008	?	25.5	26.8	11.5	3.9	5.3	1.4	–	–	–	13.5	8.5	1.3
Opina/CEO	16 Jun–1 Jul 2008	2,000	23.1	22.0	11.3	4.0	6.1	1.1	–	–	–	19.1	7.4	1.1
Opina/CEO	14–25 Apr 2008	2,000	21.5	27.9	9.5	4.5	7.6	1.4	–	–	–	18.2	6.3	6.4
GESOP/El Periódico	22–24 Apr 2008	?	29.4	30.3	10.4	2.6	5.5	0.9	–	–	–	11.0	5.6	0.9
2008 general election	9 Mar 2008	—N/a	14.9	32.1	5.6	11.6	3.5	0.5	0.0	–	–	—N/a	28.8	17.2
Opina/CEO	21–30 Jan 2008	2,000	20.8	21.2	10.8	2.9	7.9	1.6	–	–	–	23.9	7.1	0.4
GESOP/El Periódico	8–11 Jan 2008	?	23.5	26.6	10.9	4.3	6.5	1.1	–	–	–	–	–	3.1
GESOP/ICPS	5 Nov–1 Dec 2007	2,000	15.8	22.0	8.1	4.0	5.2	0.4	–	–	–	12.6	28.9	6.2
GESOP/El Periódico	14 Oct 2007	?	22.4	25.4	12.6	4.1	5.1	1.5	–	–	–	12.9	9.3	3.0
Opina/CEO	17–28 Sep 2007	2,200	16.6	20.2	10.2	2.4	7.7	1.0	–	–	–	25.7	9.2	3.6
Opina/CEO	18 Jun–2 Jul 2007	2,200	18.5	19.8	9.6	3.1	7.4	1.5	–	–	–	23.9	9.5	1.3
GESOP/El Periódico	25–27 Jun 2007	?	24.5	23.5	11.5	5.1	6.5	1.5	–	–	–	9.9	10.0	1.0
GESOP/El Periódico	15–17 Apr 2007	800	23.7	24.6	11.5	3.4	7.4	1.6	–	–	–	13.4	16.8	0.9
Opina/CEO	2–16 Mar 2007	2,200	19.5	20.2	9.6	4.1	7.2	1.8	–	–	–	22.7	10.1	0.7
GESOP/El Periódico	17–18 Jan 2007	800	24.3	22.6	11.4	4.1	7.4	2.9	–	–	–	13.6	9.1	1.7
DYM/CEO	6–20 Nov 2006	2,100	22.6	17.1	11.0	4.1	9.6	4.4	–	–	–	16.0	9.1	5.5
2006 regional election	1 Nov 2006	—N/a	17.8	15.2	7.9	6.0	5.4	1.7	–	–	–	—N/a	43.2	2.6

=== Victory preferences ===
The table below lists opinion polling on the victory preferences for each party in the event of a regional election taking place.

Polling firm/Commissioner	Fieldwork date	Sample size	CiU	PSC	ERC	PP	ICV–EUiA	C's	PxC	RI.cat	SI	Other/ None	Question	Lead
Metroscopia/El País	16–17 Nov 2010	1,508	50.0	27.0	–	–	–	–	–	–	–	23.0		23.0
Opina/Cadena SER	8–9 Nov 2010	1,200	36.4	20.8	5.3	7.1	3.1	1.2	–	0.6	2.7	8.9	14.0	15.6
CIS	15 Oct–4 Nov 2010	2,966	27.6	19.1	8.0	5.9	6.9	3.1	0.7	0.9	0.7	0.6	26.3	8.5

=== Victory likelihood ===
The table below lists opinion polling on the perceived likelihood of victory for each party in the event of a regional election taking place.

Polling firm/Commissioner	Fieldwork date	Sample size	CiU	PSC	ERC	PP	ICV–EUiA	C's	PxC	RI.cat	SI	Other/ None	Question	Lead
Opina/Cadena SER	8–9 Nov 2010	1,200	66.7	12.8	0.4	3.4	0.6	0.3	–	0.0	0.3	–	15.6	53.9
CIS	15 Oct–4 Nov 2010	2,966	56.9	14.1	0.5	5.5	0.1	0.2	0.1	0.1	–	0.1	22.4	42.8

=== Preferred President ===
The table below lists opinion polling on leader preferences to become president of the Government of Catalonia.

All candidates

Color key:

Poll conducted after legal ban on opinion polls

Polling firm/Commissioner	Fieldwork date	Sample size												Other/ None/ Not care	Question	Lead
Polling firm/Commissioner	Fieldwork date	Sample size	Mas CiU	Montilla PSC	Carod ERC	Puigcercós ERC	Piqué PP	Sirera PP	Camacho PP	Saura ICV–EUiA	Herrera ICV–EUiA	Rivera C's	Laporta SI	Other/ None/ Not care	Question	Lead
GESOP/El Periòdic	25–27 Nov 2010	900	40.0	15.0	–	5.0	–	–	4.2	–	6.2	3.3	2.9	–	–	25.0
GESOP/El Periòdic	24–26 Nov 2010	900	38.2	15.4	–	4.9	–	–	4.8	–	6.2	2.6	2.8	–	–	22.8
GESOP/El Periòdic	23–25 Nov 2010	900	37.4	16.2	–	4.2	–	–	4.2	–	6.2	3.2	2.9	–	–	21.2
GESOP/El Periòdic	22–24 Nov 2010	800	35.6	16.4	–	3.4	–	–	4.6	–	5.9	3.4	3.0	–	–	19.2
GESOP/El Periòdic	20–23 Nov 2010	700	36.9	17.1	–	3.9	–	–	4.6	–	5.0	4.0	2.6	–	–	19.8
GESOP/El Periòdic	20–22 Nov 2010	600	33.7	17.3	–	5.0	–	–	4.3	–	3.8	3.7	3.2	–	–	16.4
GESOP/El Periódico	20–21 Nov 2010	400	32.8	17.8	–	–	–	–	–	–	–	–	–	–	–	15.0
GESOP/El Periódico	7–10 Nov 2010	800	38.6	17.4	–	5.0	–	–	4.6	–	5.1	1.6	4.5	17.5	5.7	21.2
Opina/Cadena SER	8–9 Nov 2010	1,200	38.6	20.1	–	4.6	–	–	4.1	–	2.7	1.2	2.7	9.0	17.0	18.5
CIS	15 Oct–4 Nov 2010	2,966	30.9	17.5	–	5.5	–	–	3.9	–	5.4	2.7	–	8.1	26.0	13.4
GESOP/ICPS	3–30 Sep 2010	2,000	23.8	17.6	–	4.3	–	–	1.8	–	3.0	1.0	4.3	34.4	9.8	6.2
GESOP/El Periódico	26–28 Sep 2010	800	37.3	18.3	–	5.1	–	–	2.9	–	2.8	2.3	5.6	25.2	6.9	19.0
GESOP/El Periódico	10–11 Jun 2010	800	32.6	18.0	–	6.4	–	–	3.8	–	5.0	–	4.6	29.6		14.6
GESOP/El Periódico	15–18 Mar 2010	?	31.9	24.1	–	6.6	–	–	2.8	–	4.5	1.3	5.0	23.8		7.8
GESOP/El Periódico	26–28 Oct 2009	800	27.3	25.4	–	7.6	–	–	3.1	–	5.6	–	–	31.0		1.9
GESOP/ICPS	28 Sep–19 Oct 2009	1,200	24.2	26.6	–	6.7	–	–	1.8	–	5.2	0.8	–	26.9	7.9	2.4
GESOP/El Periódico	1–2 Jul 2008	?	25.6	32.6	9.4	–	–	1.4	–	4.8	–	2.1	–	24.1		7.0
GESOP/El Periódico	22–24 Apr 2008	?	26.1	30.0	9.6	–	–	1.5	–	6.0	–	2.0	–	24.8		3.9
GESOP/ICPS	5 Nov–1 Dec 2007	2,000	17.5	26.7	8.9	–	–	1.3	–	5.4	–	–	–	34.5	5.6	9.2
GESOP/El Periódico	14 Oct 2007	?	25.8	26.5	10.3	–	–	1.8	–	6.0	–	1.8	–	27.8		0.7
GESOP/El Periódico	25–27 Jun 2007	?	26.0	25.3	9.3	–	7.0	–	–	5.3	–	2.3	–	24.8		0.7
GESOP/El Periódico	15–17 Apr 2007	800	26.3	26.1	10.1	–	3.9	–	–	7.6	–	2.4	–	23.6		0.2
GESOP/El Periódico	17–18 Jan 2007	800	26.1	22.3	10.1	–	6.0	–	–	6.9	–	2.6	–	26.0		3.8

Mas vs. Montilla

Color key:

Poll conducted after legal ban on opinion polls

Polling firm/Commissioner	Fieldwork date	Sample size			Other/ None/ Not care	Question	Lead
Polling firm/Commissioner	Fieldwork date	Sample size	Mas CiU	Montilla PSC	Other/ None/ Not care	Question	Lead
Obradoiro de Socioloxía/Público	15–20 Nov 2010	2,500	43.9	21.3	34.8		22.6
TNS Demoscopia/Antena 3	19 Nov 2010	?	51.2	31.2	13.2	4.4	20.0
Noxa/La Vanguardia	15–18 Nov 2010	1,200	51.0	28.0	21.0		23.0
Feedback/RAC 1	8–12 Nov 2010	1,000	51.9	22.1	25.4	0.6	29.8
GESOP/El Periódico	7–10 Nov 2010	800	56.4	32.1	11.5		24.3
TNS Demoscopia/Antena 3	24 Oct 2010	?	53.6	25.2	14.1	7.1	28.4
Feedback/RAC 1	18–22 Oct 2010	1,000	50.5	23.1	23.1	3.3	27.4
GESOP/ICPS	3–30 Sep 2010	2,000	36.5	30.6	23.7	9.2	5.9
GESOP/El Periódico	26–28 Sep 2010	800	56.5	28.4	15.1		28.1
Feedback/RAC 1	20–24 Sep 2010	1,000	56.0	24.0	16.3	3.7	32.0
Noxa/La Vanguardia	1–2 Sep 2010	800	44.0	27.0	29.0		17.0
Noxa/La Vanguardia	12–14 Jul 2010	1,000	52.0	25.0	23.0		27.0
GESOP/El Periódico	10–11 Jun 2010	800	52.3	34.3	13.4		18.0
Noxa/La Vanguardia	10–13 May 2010	1,000	50.0	28.0	22.0		22.0
Obradoiro de Socioloxía/Público	7–16 Apr 2010	2,500	34.0	26.8	39.2		7.2
GESOP/El Periódico	15–18 Mar 2010	?	47.6	38.8	13.6		8.8
Noxa/La Vanguardia	8–10 Mar 2010	1,000	50.0	30.0	20.0		20.0
GESOP/El Periódico	26–28 Oct 2009	800	45.8	42.8	13.6		3.0
Noxa/La Vanguardia	22–27 Oct 2009	1,000	45.0	34.0	21.0		11.0
GESOP/ICPS	28 Sep–19 Oct 2009	1,200	32.8	39.1	19.7	8.5	6.3
Obradoiro de Socioloxía/Público	1–4 Sep 2009	?	34.1	29.6	36.3		4.5
GESOP/El Periódico	9–11 Mar 2009	800	45.4	44.8	9.8		0.6
Noxa/La Vanguardia	24–27 Nov 2008	600	46.0	36.0	18.0		10.0
GESOP/El Periódico	10–13 Nov 2008	800	39.9	45.4	14.7		5.5
GESOP/ICPS	20 Oct–12 Nov 2008	1,200	28.1	38.4	23.6	10.0	10.3
GESOP/El Periódico	1–2 Jul 2008	?	41.1	47.6	11.3		6.5
GESOP/El Periódico	22–24 Apr 2008	?	42.6	49.4	8.0		6.8
GESOP/El Periódico	8–11 Jan 2008	?	40.9	43.8	15.3		2.9
GESOP/ICPS	5 Nov–1 Dec 2007	2,000	25.3	39.9	28.5	6.2	14.6
Noxa/La Vanguardia	22–25 Oct 2007	800	37.0	42.0	10.0	11.0	5.0
GESOP/El Periódico	17–18 Jan 2007	800	40.0	39.4	20.6		0.6

=== Predicted President ===
The table below lists opinion polling on the perceived likelihood for each leader to become president.

Polling firm/Commissioner	Fieldwork date	Sample size								Other/ None/ Not care	Question	Lead
Polling firm/Commissioner	Fieldwork date	Sample size	Mas CiU	Montilla PSC	Puigcercós ERC	Camacho PP	Herrera ICV–EUiA	Rivera C's	Laporta SI	Other/ None/ Not care	Question	Lead
Obradoiro de Socioloxía/Público	15–20 Nov 2010	2,500	69.7	12.5	–	–	–	–	–	17.8		57.2
GESOP/El Periódico	7–10 Nov 2010	800	75.1	13.4	–	–	–	–	–	0.8	10.7	61.7
Opina/Cadena SER	8–9 Nov 2010	1,200	66.6	10.9	0.4	1.8	0.2	0.5	0.8	0.0	18.8	55.7
Obradoiro de Socioloxía/Público	7–16 Apr 2010	2,500	43.4	22.4	–	–	–	–	–	34.2		21.0
Obradoiro de Socioloxía/Público	1–4 Sep 2009	?	28.2	35.1	–	–	–	–	–	36.7		6.9

== Voter turnout ==
The table below shows registered voter turnout during the election. Figures for election day do not include non-resident citizens, while final figures do.

Province	Time (Election day)									Final		
Province	13:00			18:00			20:00			Final		
Province	2006	2010	+/–	2006	2010	+/–	2006	2010	+/–	2006	2010	+/–
Barcelona	25.58%	24.74%	−0.84	45.25%	48.47%	+3.22	56.69%	60.05%	+3.36	55.94%	58.88%	+2.94
Girona	27.32%	26.62%	−0.70	47.69%	50.38%	+2.69	57.67%	60.49%	+2.82	57.13%	59.49%	+2.36
Lleida	24.26%	23.40%	−0.86	47.08%	48.30%	+1.22	60.30%	61.78%	+1.48	59.00%	59.87%	+0.87
Tarragona	23.87%	24.24%	+0.37	42.53%	46.07%	+3.54	54.64%	57.68%	+3.04	54.13%	56.79%	+2.66
Total	25.49%	24.79%	−0.70	45.30%	48.39%	+3.09	56.78%	59.95%	+3.17	56.04%	58.78%	+2.74

== Results ==
=== Overall ===
← Summary of the 28 November 2010 Parliament of Catalonia election results →
Parties and alliances	Popular vote			Seats	
Parties and alliances	Votes	%	±pp	Total	+/−
Convergence and Union (CiU)	1,202,830	38.43	+6.91	62	+14
Socialists' Party of Catalonia (PSC–PSOE)	575,233	18.38	−8.44	28	−9
People's Party (PP)	387,066	12.37	+1.72	18	+4
Initiative for Catalonia Greens–United and Alternative Left (ICV–EUiA)	230,824	7.37	−2.15	10	−2
Republican Left of Catalonia (ERC)	219,173	7.00	−7.03	10	−11
Citizens–Party of the Citizenry (C's)	106,154	3.39	+0.36	3	±0
Catalan Solidarity for Independence (SI)	102,921	3.29	New	4	+4
Platform for Catalonia (PxC)	75,134	2.40	New	0	±0
Independence Rally (RI.cat)	39,834	1.27	New	0	±0
Blank Seats–Citizens for Blank Votes (EB–CenB)^{1}	18,679	0.60	+0.35	0	±0
The Greens–European Green Group (EV–GVE)	15,784	0.50	New	0	±0
Anti-Bullfighting Party Against Mistreatment of Animals (PACMA)	14,238	0.45	−0.01	0	±0
From Below (Des de Baix)	7,189	0.23	New	0	±0
Reus Independent Coordinator (CORI)	6,990	0.22	New	0	±0
Pirates of Catalonia (Pirata.cat)	6,451	0.21	New	0	±0
Union, Progress and Democracy (UPyD)	5,418	0.17	New	0	±0
Pensioners in Action Party (PDLPEA)	3,330	0.11	New	0	±0
Communist Party of the Catalan People (PCPC)	3,028	0.10	−0.08	0	±0
Government Alternative (AG)	2,208	0.07	New	0	±0
Family and Life Party (PFiV)	2,201	0.07	−0.02	0	±0
For a Fairer World (PUM+J)	2,100	0.07	+0.04	0	±0
Internationalist Socialist Workers' Party (POSI)	1,920	0.06	−0.13	0	±0
Spanish Phalanx of the CNSO (FE de las JONS)	1,760	0.06	New	0	±0
Left Republican Party–Republican Left (PRE–IR)	1,547	0.05	+0.03	0	±0
Castilian Party (PCAS)	1,066	0.03	New	0	±0
Humanist Party (PH)	908	0.03	−0.06	0	±0
Communist Unification of Spain (UCE)	904	0.03	New	0	±0
Farmers for the Catalan Rural Dignity (PDR.cat)	824	0.03	New	0	±0
Republican Social Movement (MSR)	788	0.03	−0.01	0	±0
Our People (GN)	597	0.02	New	0	±0
We Are All Equal (GLBTH/TSI)	498	0.02	New	0	±0
Party for Catalonia (PxCAT)	314	0.01	New	0	±0
Democratic and Social Centre (CDS)	218	0.01	New	0	±0
Catalan Sovereigntist Bloc (Bloc SC)	187	0.01	New	0	±0
Aragonese Party (PAR)	98	0.00	New	0	±0
Internationalist Solidarity and Self-Management (SAIn)	82	0.00	New	0	±0
Social and Liberal Alternative (ALS)	54	0.00	New	0	±0
Progress and Justice Party (PJP)	49	0.00	New	0	±0
Democratic Web (DW)	46	0.00	New	0	±0
Blank ballots	91,631	2.93	+0.90		
Total	3,130,276			135	±0
Valid votes	3,130,276	99.29	−0.25		
Invalid votes	22,354	0.71	+0.25		
Votes cast / turnout	3,152,630	58.78	+2.74		
Abstentions	2,211,058	41.22	−2.74		
Registered voters	5,363,688				
Sources
Footnotes: ^{1} Blank Seats–Citizens for Blank Votes results are compared to the combined totals of Unsubmissive Seats–Alternative of Discontented Democrats and Citizens for Blank Votes in the 2006 election.

Popular vote
CiU	38.43%
PSC–PSOE	18.38%
PP	12.37%
ICV–EUiA	7.37%
ERC	7.00%
C's	3.39%
SI	3.29%
PxC	2.40%
RI.cat	1.27%
Others	3.18%
Blank ballots	2.93%

Seats
CiU	45.93%
PSC–PSOE	20.74%
PP	13.33%
ICV–EUiA	7.41%
ERC	7.41%
SI	2.96%
C's	2.22%

=== Distribution by constituency ===
Constituency	CiU		PSC		PP		ICV–EUiA		ERC		C's		SI	
Constituency	%	S	%	S	%	S	%	S	%	S	%	S	%	S
Barcelona	36.8	35	19.2	18	12.9	12	8.3	8	6.4	6	3.8	3	3.1	3
Girona	45.1	9	14.3	3	8.6	1	4.8	1	9.2	2	1.7	−	4.7	1
Lleida	46.9	8	14.8	3	10.2	2	4.0	−	9.1	1	1.5	−	3.1	−
Tarragona	39.3	9	18.2	4	13.4	3	5.1	1	8.5	1	2.7	−	3.4	−
Total	38.4	62	18.4	28	12.4	18	7.4	10	7.0	10	3.4	3	3.3	4

== Aftermath ==
=== Government formation ===
Investiture; Nomination of Artur Mas (CiU)
Ballot →	21 December 2010	23 December 2010
Required majority →	68 out of 135	Simple
Yes: • CiU (62)	62 / 135	62 / 135
No: • PSC (28) (on 21 Dec); • PP (18); • ICV–EUiA (10); • ERC (10); • SI (4); • C's (3)	73 / 135	45 / 135
Abstentions: • PSC (28) (on 23 Dec)	0 / 135	28 / 135
Absentees	0 / 135	0 / 135

== Bibliography ==
- Ley Orgánica 4/1979, de 18 de diciembre, de Estatuto de Autonomía de Cataluña (Organic Law 4/1979). Official State Gazette (in Spanish). 18 December 1979. BOE-A-1979-30178.
- Ley Orgánica 5/1985, de 19 de junio, del Régimen Electoral General (Organic Law 5/1985). Official State Gazette (in Spanish). 19 June 1985 [version as of 5 November 2010]. BOE-A-1985-11672.
- Ley Orgánica 6/2006, de 19 de julio, de reforma del Estatuto de Autonomía de Cataluña (Organic Law 6/2006). Official State Gazette (in Spanish). 19 July 2006 [version as of 17 July 2010]. BOE-A-2006-13087.
- Ley 13/2008, de 5 de noviembre, de la presidencia de la Generalidad y del Gobierno (Law 13/2008). Official State Gazette (in Spanish). 5 November 2008 [version as of 6 September 2010]. BOE-A-2008-19526.
- Decreto 132/2010, de 4 de octubre, de convocatoria de elecciones al Parlamento de Cataluña y de su disolución (PDF) (Decree 132/2010). Official Journal of the Government of Catalonia (in Spanish). 4 October 2010.
