= Daniel Sirera =

Spanish politician

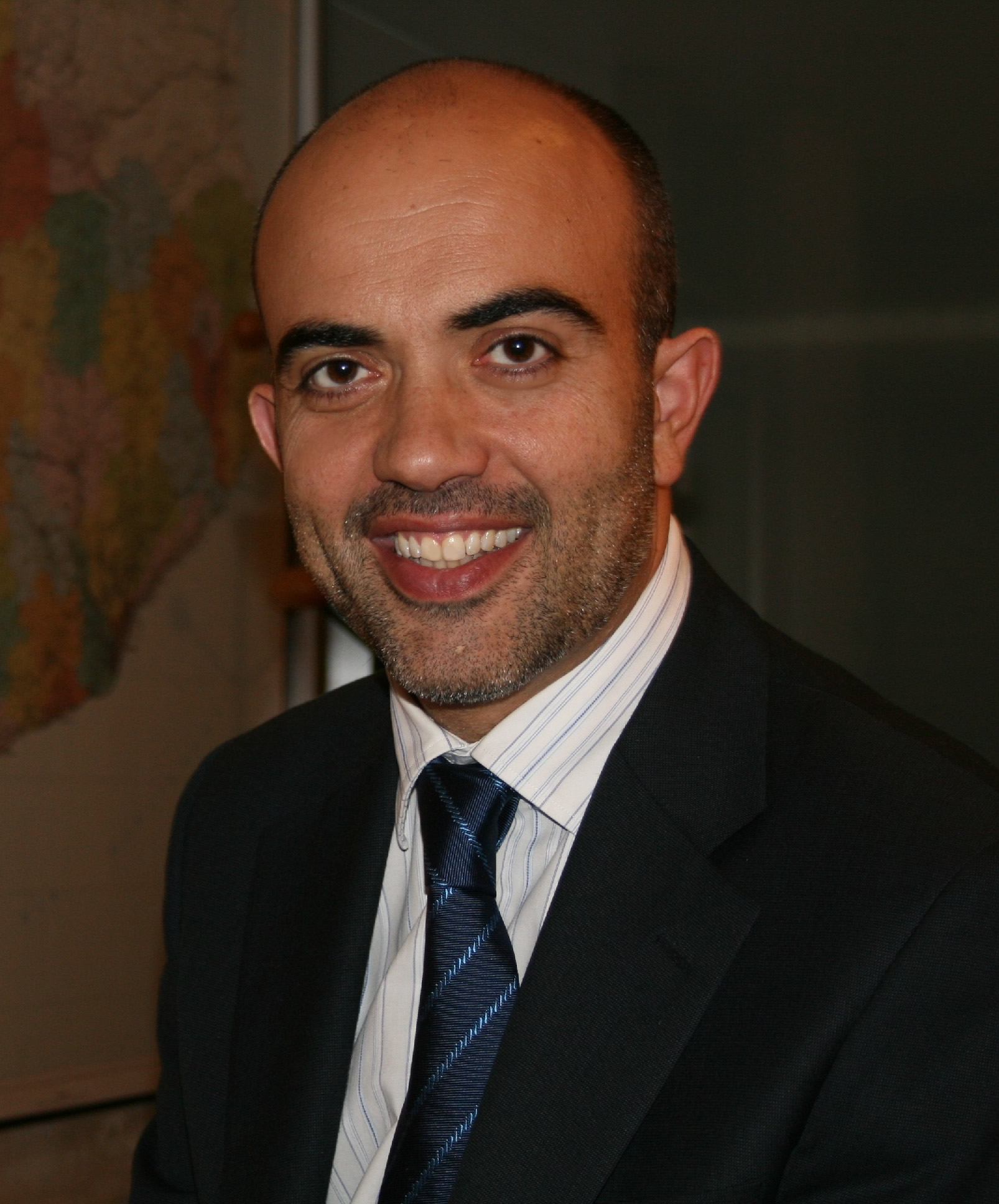

City Councilor of Barcelona
- Incumbent
- Assumed office 17 June 2023
- In office 1996–1999

Chairman of the People's Party of Catalonia
- In office July 2007 – July 2008
- Preceded by: Josep Piqué
- Succeeded by: Alicia Sánchez-Camacho

Personal details
- Born: 30 July 1967 (age 58); Badalona, Catalonia, Spain
- Political party: Partido Popular

Daniel Sirera Bellés (born 30 July 1967 in Badalona) is a Spanish politician. He served as the chairman of the People's Party in Catalonia (PPC) from 2007–08.

== Biography ==
Sirera, was born in Badalona, Catalonia, Spain. His father was a city guard who later books at the Sant Antoni market, and his grandfather was a metro ticket clerk. In 1973 he moved with his family to the Sant Antoni neighborhood in Barcelona. After spending about a year in Valencia, he returned to Barcelona. He is a law graduate of the University of Barcelona. He is married and has two children.

He is a former columnist for online newspaper Libertad Digital.

From 1992 until 1998 Sirera worked as a lawyer in the law firm VOabogados in Sant Cugat del Vallès. In 1996 he received the Medal of Honor of the Bar Association of Barcelona for his work.

From 1996-2010 Sirera was a deputy in the Parliament of Catalonia.

From 1996-99 he was a councilor in the Barcelona City Council.

In 1997 the Generalitat de Catalunya awarded Sirera the Civil Protection Silver Medal for his contributions to the design of the Catalan Civil Protection system (1997).

From 2007–08 Sirera served as the chairman of the People's Party in Catalonia (PPC) and a senator representing the Generalitat of Catalonia.

In 2009, he founded the communication agency S & L Comunicació. Sirera was its managing partner between 2009 and 2012.

From 2012-22 Sirera was a member of the Audiovisual Council of Catalonia.

From 2014-22, he was a member of the Advisory Board of the Internet Governance Forum in Spain.

From June 2023, he has been the president of the Municipal Group of the Popular Party at Barcelona City Council.

Sirera is currently a deputy in the Parliament of Catalonia for the constituency of Barcelona, and is the leader of the PPC's parliamentary group.
