= Marcela Topor =

Romanian journalist

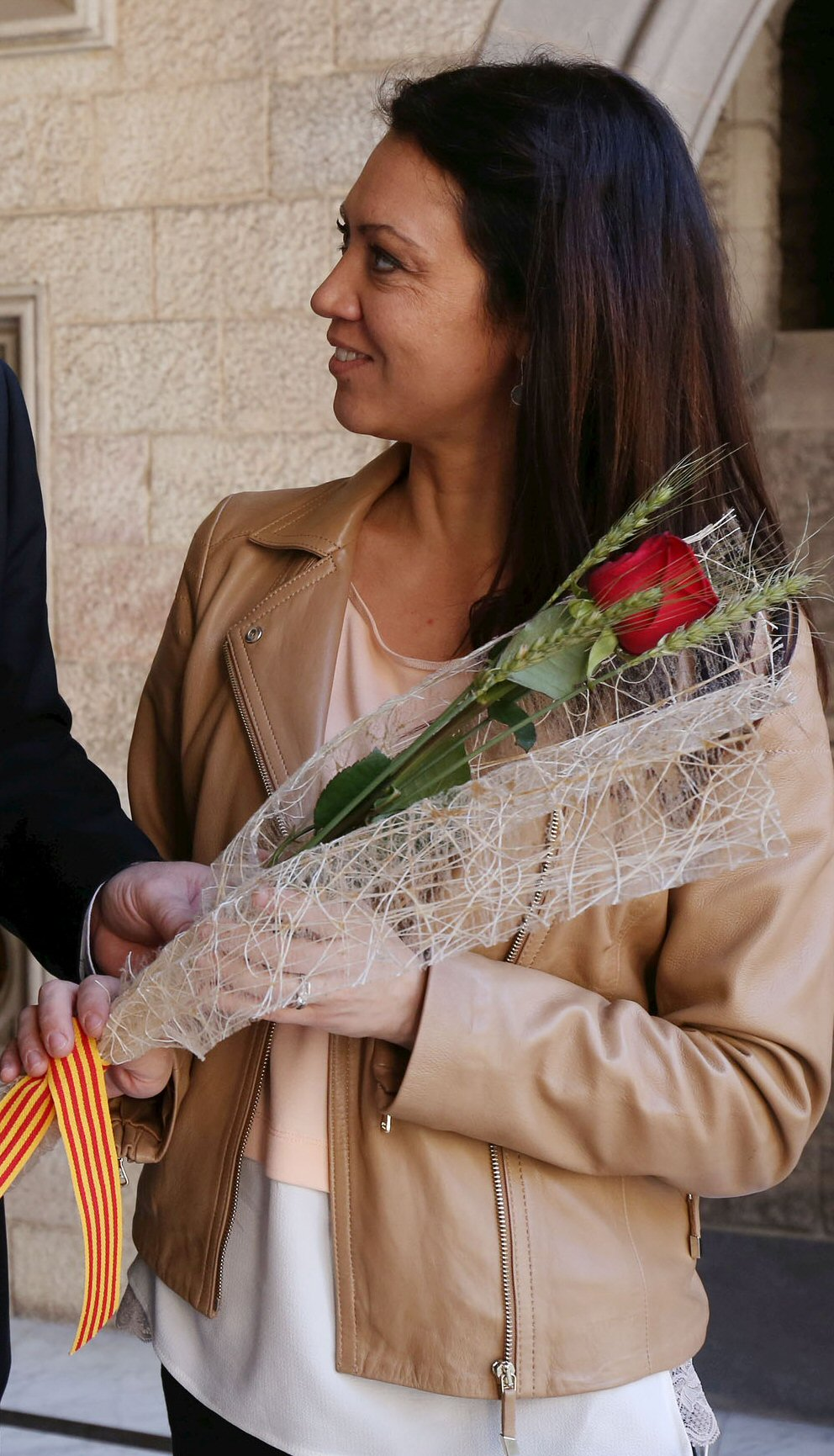
- Topor in 2016
- Born: 8 September 1976 (age 49); Vaslui, Romania
- Education: Alexandru Ioan Cuza University
- Occupation: Journalist
- Known for: editor of Catalonia Today
- Spouse: Carles Puigdemont (m. 2000)
- Children: 2

Marcela Topor (Romanian pronunciation: [marˈtʃela toˈpor]; born 8 September 1976) is a Romanian journalist, and the wife of Catalan politician and journalist Carles Puigdemont, the former President of Catalonia's Generalitat. She holds a degree in English philology from the Alexandru Ioan Cuza University of Iași. Topor first met her future husband at the International Festival of Amateur Theatre of Girona in 1996, in which she participated as an actress with the Ludic Theatre company. They married in 2000.

Topor is the editor of Catalonia Today, an English-language magazine and website based in Girona. She also hosts the television programme Catalan Connections, which features interviews in English with resident foreigners in Catalonia, broadcast on the El Punt Avui TV channel and posted to the Catalonia Today website.

The couple has two daughters. Topor speaks Spanish, English, Romanian, and Catalan.
