= Lluc Salellas =

Mayor of Girona

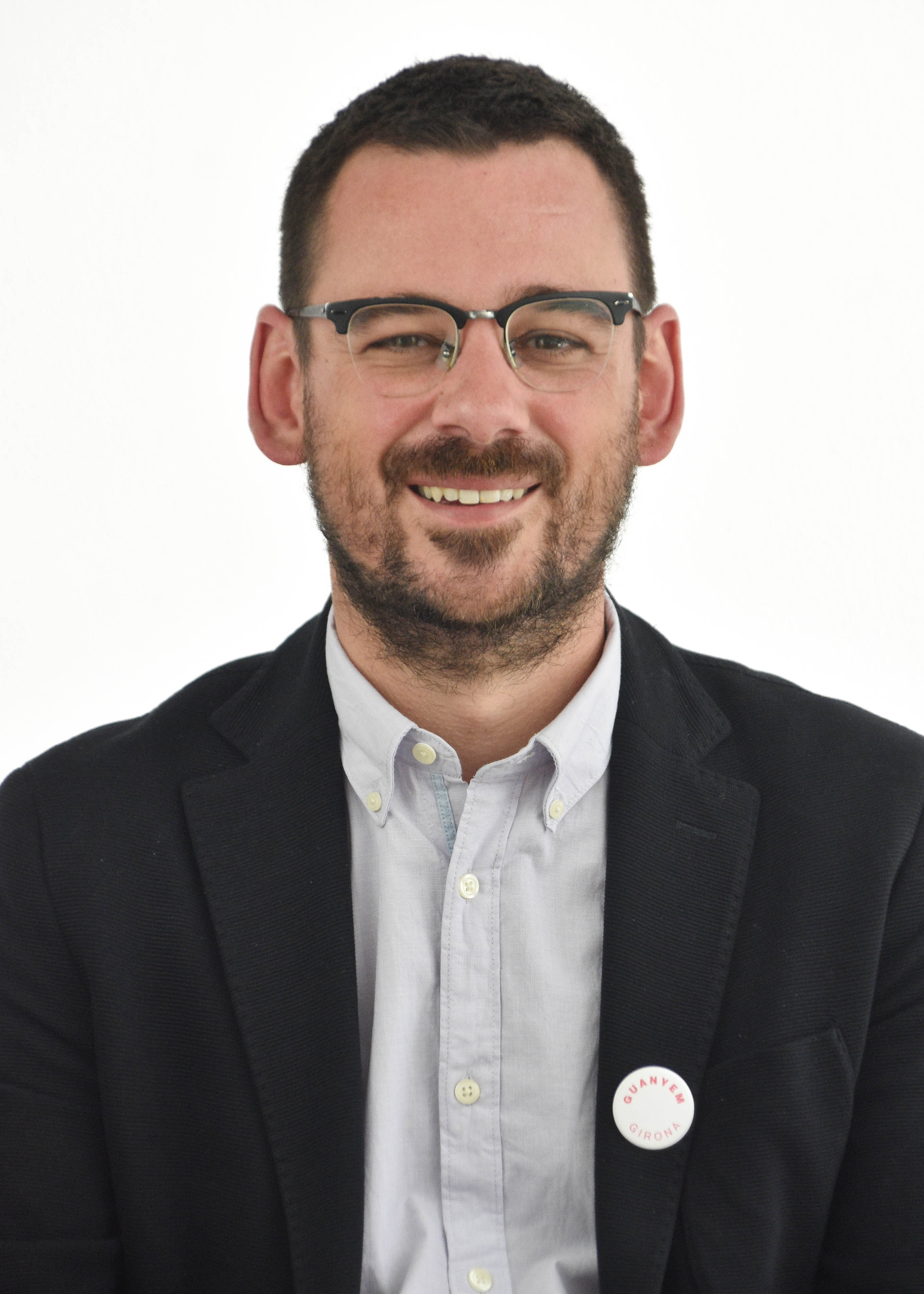

Mayor of Girona
- Incumbent
- Assumed office 17 June 2023
- Preceded by: Marta Madrenas i Mir

Girona City Councilor
- Incumbent
- Assumed office 13 June 2015

Member of the national secretariat of the Popular Unity Candidacy
- Incumbent
- Assumed office 2016

Personal details
- Born: Lluc Salellas i Vilar; December 31, 1984 (age 41) Girona, Spain
- Party: Popular Unity Candidacy
- Other political affiliations: Guanyem Girona
- Education: Pompeu Fabra University (BSc) University of Edinburgh (MA

Lluc Salellas i Vilar (born December 31, 1984) is a Spanish journalist and politician who is the current Mayor of Girona since 2023. Since 2016 he is a member of the national secretariat of the Popular Unity Candidacy.

== Biography ==
Lluc Salellas i Vilar was born on December 31 in Girona, Spain to Sebastià Salellas i Magret who was a lawyer, and Glòria Vilar. His brother Benet Salellas is also a lawyer and a former member of the Parliament of Catalonia from 2015 to 2017. He began his political career in 2012 as the head of the Popular Unity Candidacy for Girona Council in the 2012 Catalan Parliament elections the year which this political party ran for Spanish parliamentary seats and won 3 councils in Barcelona.

Lluc Salellas i Vilar graduated from Pompeu Fabra University with a degree in Journalism and Political Science, and holds a master's degree in Nationalism Studies from the University of Edinburgh. He was elected mayor of Girona in 2023.
