= Carles Puigdemont =

Politician and journalist from Catalonia, Spain (born 1962)

The Right Honourable Carles Puigdemont MP
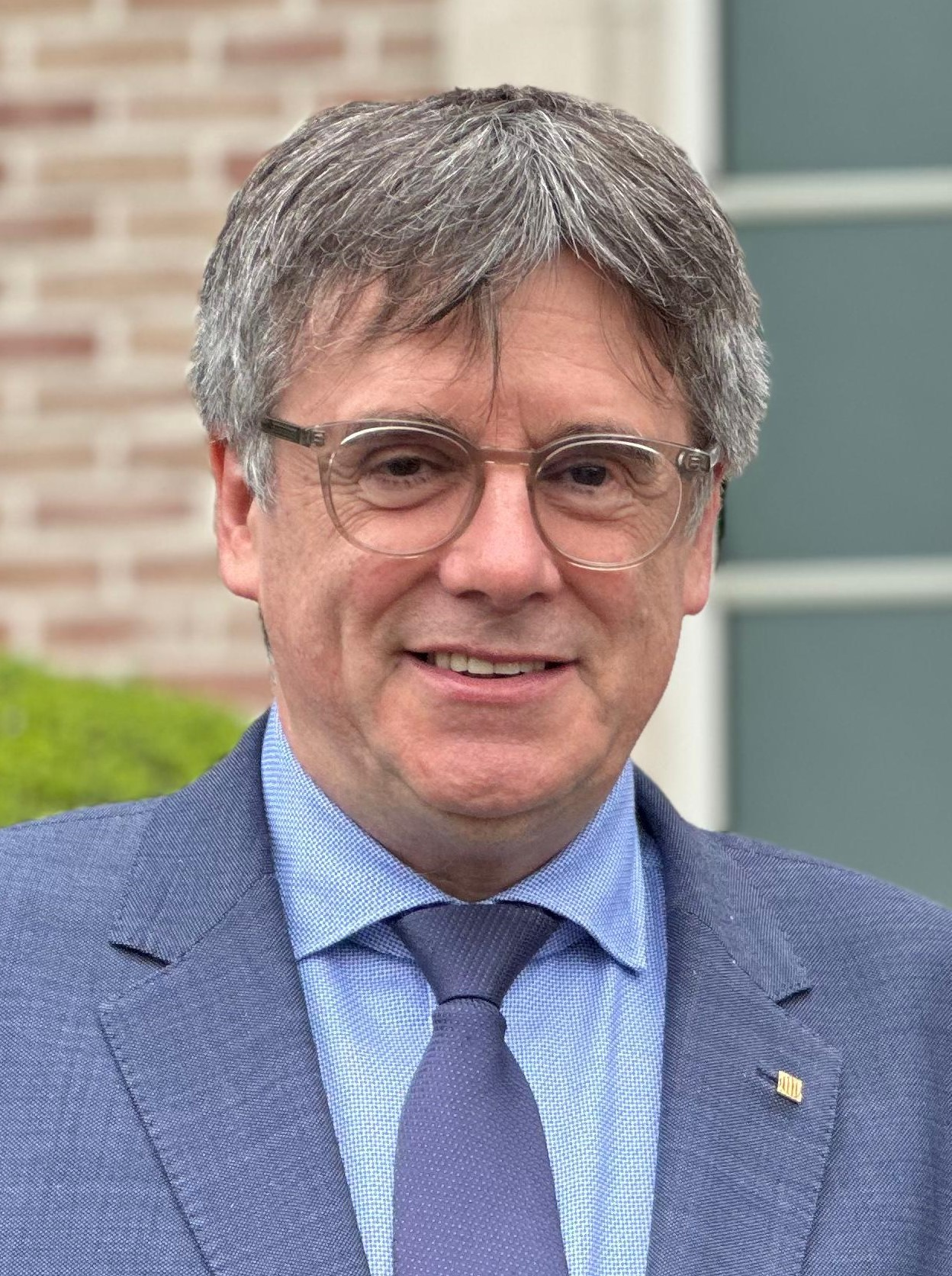
- Puigdemont in 2024

President of Together for Catalonia
- Incumbent
- Assumed office 27 October 2024
- Preceded by: Laura Borràs
- In office 9 August 2020 – 4 June 2022
- Preceded by: Office established
- Succeeded by: Laura Borràs

130th President of the Government of Catalonia
- In office 12 January 2016 – 27 October 2017
- Monarch: Felipe VI
- Vice President: Oriol Junqueras
- Preceded by: Artur Mas
- Succeeded by: Direct rule (Quim Torra from 17 May 2018)

Member of the European Parliament for Spain
- In office 2 July 2019 (Note: After ECJ ruling in late 2019 on the status of Oriol Junqueras. He initiated the proceedings to formally obtain the MEP seat in December 2019. He attended his first session in January 2020.) – 15 July 2024

Member of the Parliament of Catalonia
- Incumbent
- Assumed office 10 June 2024
- Constituency: Barcelona
- In office 17 January 2018 – 30 July 2018
- Constituency: Barcelona
- In office 10 November 2006 – 27 October 2017
- Constituency: Girona

Mayor of Girona
- In office 1 July 2011 – 11 January 2016
- Preceded by: Anna Pagans
- Succeeded by: Albert Ballesta i Tura

Member of the Municipality Council of Girona
- In office 11 June 2007 – 11 January 2016

Personal details
- Born: Carles Puigdemont i Casamajó; 29 December 1962 (age 63) Amer, Catalonia, Spain
- Party: Junts (since 2020)
- Other political affiliations: CNxR (2019–2020); PDeCAT (2016–2020); CDC (1980–2016)
- Spouse: Marcela Topor (m. 2000)
- Children: 2
- Occupation: Politician; journalist
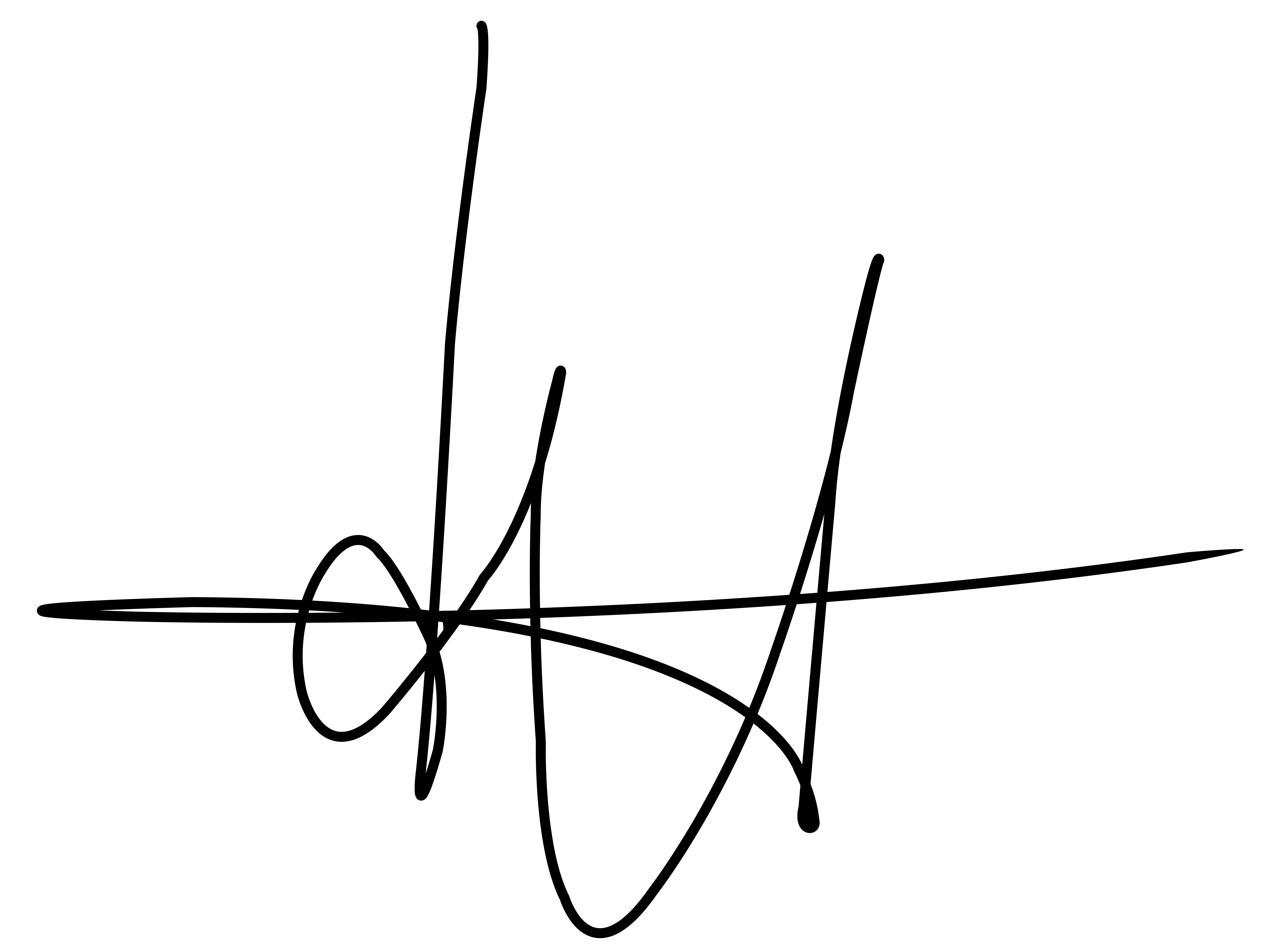
- Signature
- Website: www.carlespuigdemont.cat

Carles Puigdemont i Casamajó (Note: Some Spanish-language media (especially conservative outlets or those opposed to Catalan independence) refer to him as Carlos.)(Catalan pronunciation: [ˈkarləs ˌpudʒdəˈmon i ˌkazəməˈʒo]; born 29 December 1962) is a Catalan politician and journalist. He has been the President of Together for Catalonia (Junts) since 2024, having previously held the office from 2020 to 2022. He served as the 130th President of the Government of Catalonia from 2016 to 2017. His government held an independence referendum, which culminated in the unsuccessful Catalan declaration of independence and his removal from office. He then served as a Member of the European Parliament (MEP) from 2019 to 2024.

After education in Amer and Girona, he became a journalist in 1982, writing for various local publications and becoming editor-in-chief of El Punt. He was the director of the Catalan News Agency from 1999 to 2002 and the director of Girona's House of Culture from 2002 to 2004. Puigdemont's family were supporters of Catalan independence and Puigdemont became involved in politics as a teenager, joining the nationalist Democratic Convergence of Catalonia (CDC), the predecessor to the PDeCAT, in 1980. He gave up journalism to pursue a career in politics in 2006 when he was elected as a member of the Parliament of Catalonia for the constituency of Girona. He was elected to the Municipality Council of Girona in 2007 and in 2011 he became Mayor of Girona. On 10 January 2016, following an agreement between the Junts pel Sí (JxSí), an electoral alliance led by the CDC, and the Popular Unity Candidacy (CUP), the Parliament of Catalonia elected Puigdemont as the 130th President of the Government of Catalonia.

On 6–7 September 2017, the Catalan Parliament approved laws permitting an independence referendum and the juridical transition and foundation of a Republic, a legal framework superseding the Spanish Constitution to be put in place if the referendum supported independence. On 1 October 2017, the Catalan independence referendum was held in Catalonia despite the suspension of the laws by the Constitutional Court of Spain. Polling stations were partially closed and some saw the use of excessive force by the National Police Corps and Civil Guard. A total 43% of Catalan citizens voted in the referendum, 92% of them supporting independence. The Catalan Parliament declared independence on 27 October 2017 which resulted in the Spanish government imposing direct rule on Catalonia, dismissing Puigdemont and the Catalan government. The Catalan Parliament was dissolved and the 2017 Catalan regional election was held. On 30 October 2017 charges of rebellion, sedition and misuse of public funds were brought against Puigdemont and other members of the Puigdemont Government. Puigdemont, along with others, fled to Belgium and European Arrest Warrants (EAW) were issued against them. At the regional elections held on 21 December 2017, Puigdemont's party, Together for Catalonia, was second, and Catalan secessionists retained a slim majority of seats and 47.6% of votes. Puigdemont called for fresh talks with the then Spanish Prime Minister Mariano Rajoy but these were rejected.

Puigdemont remained in Belgium to avoid arrest if he returned to Spain, with this situation being defined as exile by some, self-imposed exile by some others, and also as fugitive from justice. On 25 March 2018, he was detained by the Autobahnpolizei (highway patrol) acting on his European Arrest Warrant in the northern German state of Schleswig-Holstein. He was released on bail, with the state high court deciding he could not be extradited for "rebellion" as German law does not coincide with Spanish law on the definition thereof, a requirement of his EAW. On 10 July 2018 a Spanish Supreme Court judge suspended him as a deputy in the Catalan parliament. On 12 July 2018, a German court decided that he could be extradited back to Spain for misuse of public funds, but not for the more serious charge of rebellion. Puigdemont's legal team said they would appeal any decision to extradite him. Following the German court decision, on 19 July 2018, Spain dropped the European arrest warrants against Puigdemont and other Catalan officials in self-exile. He was elected as a Member of the European Parliament after the 2019 European Parliament election in Spain. In March 2021, the European Parliament voted to lift his parliamentary immunity. On 23 September 2021, it was reported that he had been arrested by police in Sardinia, Italy, acting on a tip-off and was being asked to be transferred to Spain under the terms of a European arrest warrant. After a night in prison, he was released without any precautionary measures. His parliamentary immunity was restored by the European Court of Justice in May 2022.

In 2023, he took part in negotiations between Junts and the PSOE regarding the investiture of Pedro Sánchez as Prime Minister of Spain following the Spanish general election. The agreement—formalized in the Brussels Pact—included, among other terms, the passage of an Amnesty Law.

Following the approval of the Amnesty Law by the Congress of Deputies, the Supreme Court of Spain ruled against its application to Puigdemont. Two years later, on July 16, 2026, the Court of Justice of the European Union (CJEU) ruled that the Amnesty Law was indeed applicable. On October 6, 2026, the Constitutional Court of Spain also ruled in Puigdemont’s favor, leading Judge Llarena to withdraw the arrest warrant that had been in effect since 2017. On November 3, the same judge closed the case file with a court order acknowledging the application of the amnesty, thereby paving the way for Puigdemont’s return to Catalonia after nine years in exile.

== Early life and family ==
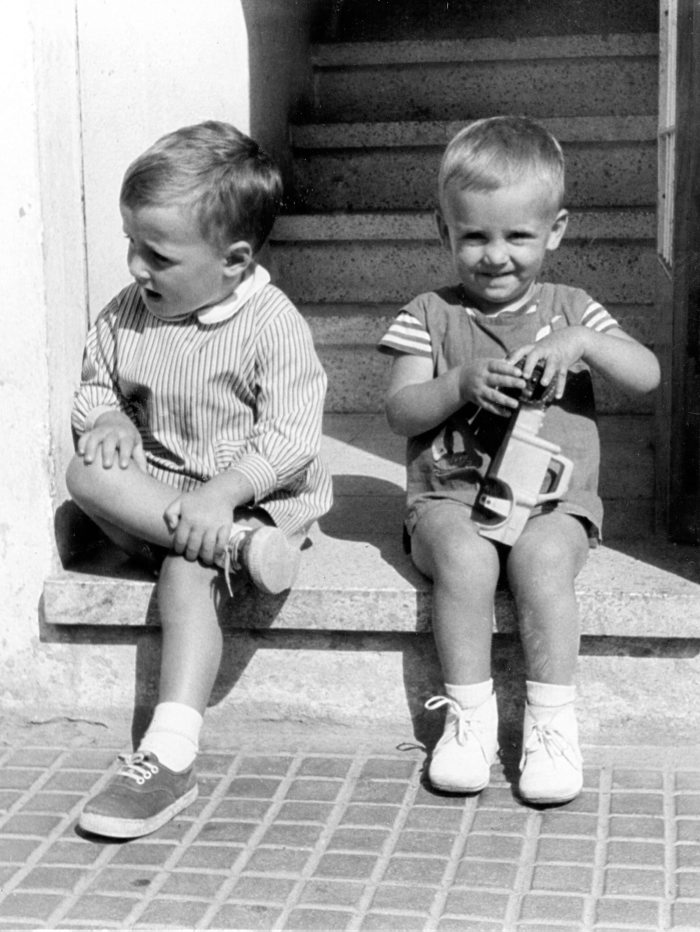
Puigdemont (right) as a child with his elder brother

Puigdemont was born on 29 December 1962 in Amer, a village in the comarca of la Selva in the province of Girona in north-eastern Catalonia, Spain. The son of Francesc Xavier Puigdemont i Oliveras, a baker, and Francesc's wife Núria Casamajó i Ruiz, he is the second of eight brothers. Puigdemont's maternal grandmother was Andalusian. Puigdemont's grandfather, who fought in the Spanish Civil War before fleeing to France, founded the Pastisseria Puigdemont in 1928. The Puigdemont family still owns the bakery located in Amer's main square. Puigdemont's great-grandfather and his uncle Josep Puigdemont were mayors of Amer and were supporters of Catalan independence, as was Puigdemont's father Xavier.

Puigdemont received basic education in Amer before, aged nine, he was sent to study at the Church-run Santa Maria del Collell boarding school in Girona where he was taught in Spanish and "learned to be a fighter". At the age of 16 he was already a reporter for the Diari de Girona newspaper, writing articles on football and other news.

As a teenager Puigdemont attended political meetings with his uncle Josep and helped found the Nationalist Youth of Catalonia. In 1980 he joined the Democratic Convergence of Catalonia (CDC), a conservative Catalan nationalist political party.

After school Puigdemont joined the University College of Girona to study Catalan philology but dropped out to pursue a career in journalism. In 1983, aged 21, Puigdemont was involved in a car accident which left him seriously injured and with a slight scar on his face. It has been suggested that this explains his Beatle haircut but friends deny this.

== Journalism career ==
Puigdemont joined the El Punt, a pro-independence Catalan language newspaper, as a journalist in 1982. He rose through the ranks to become the paper's editor-in-chief. He also wrote a weekly column for the Presència magazine. He is a member of the Catalan Journalists Association.

Beginning in 1988, Puigdemont started collecting references about Catalonia in the international press, material that resulted in the publication of the 1994 book Cata... què? Catalunya vista per la premsa internacional ("Cata...what? Catalonia as seen by the foreign press"). During the 1992 Olympic Games in Barcelona Puigdemont was a member of an organisation supporting Catalan nationalists detained as part of "Operation Garzón".

In the 1990s Puigdemont took a year off work to study linguistic policies elsewhere in Europe. As a result, he started working on application of new technologies in the provision of news and founded the Catalan News Agency (ACN) which was established by the Generalitat de Catalunya in 1999. Puigdemont also founded Catalonia Today, an English-language magazine. Puigdemont was director of ACN until 2002, when the then-president of the Diputació de Girona, Carles Pàramo, offered him the position of director of the Girona cultural centre, the Casa de Cultura, a position he held until 2004.

== Political career ==
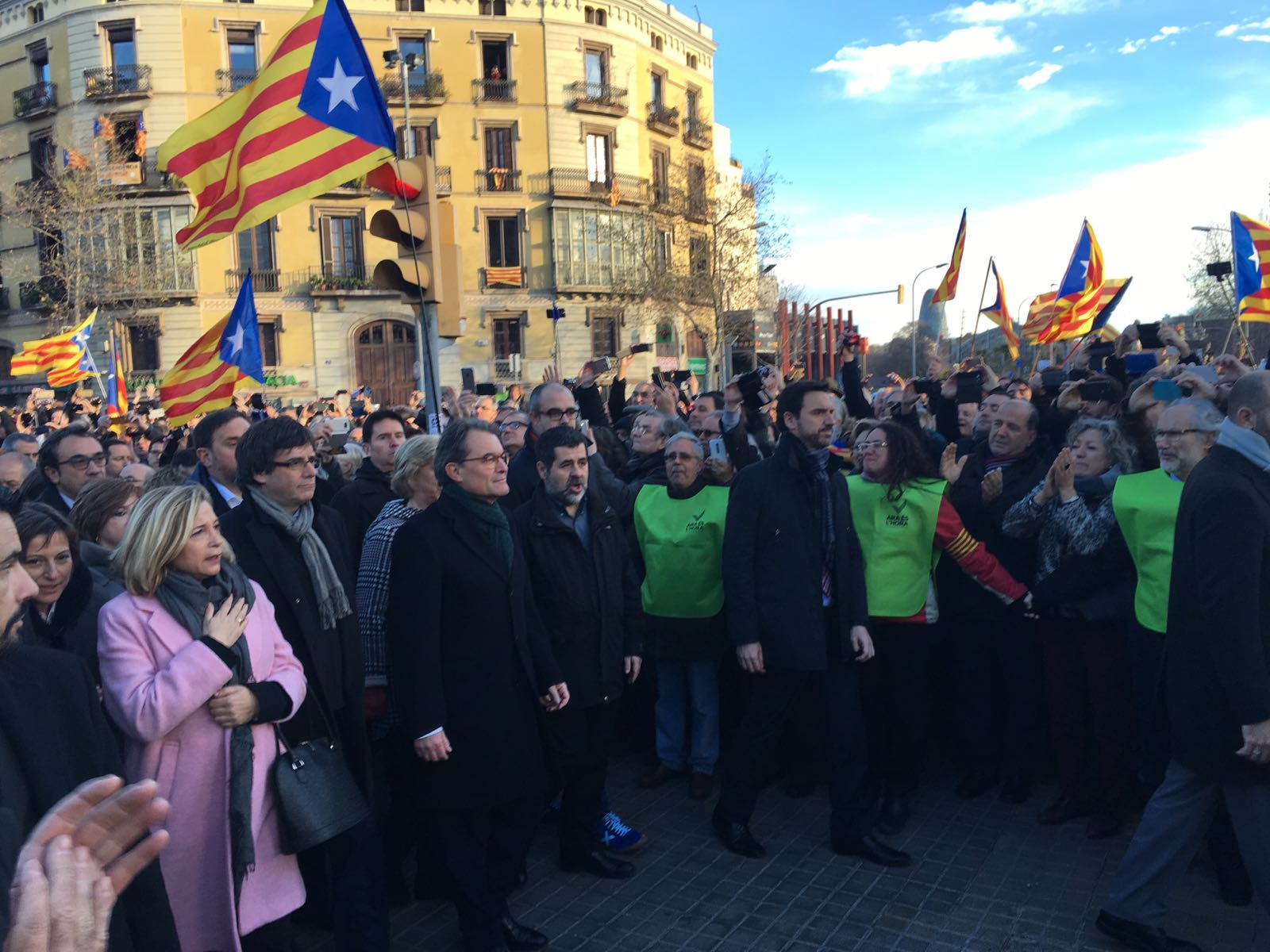
Protest against the trial of Artur Mas, Joana Ortega and Irene Rigau on 6 February 2017

Puigdemont left journalism to devote himself fully to politics in 2006 when the Convergence and Union (CiU) electoral alliance invited him to be a candidate for the Parliament of Catalonia. Puigdemont contested the 2006 regional election as a CiU candidate in the Province of Girona and was elected. He was re-elected at the 2010, 2012 and 2015 regional elections, the latter as a Junts pel Sí (JxSí) electoral alliance candidate.

Puigdemont contested the 2007 local elections as a CiU candidate in Girona and was elected but the CiU remained in opposition. At the 2011 local elections, in which Puigdemont was re-elected, the CiU ended the Socialists's 32-year rule in Girona. Puigdemont became Mayor of Girona. He was re-elected at the 2015 local elections. He was a member of executive committee of the Association of Municipalities for Independence and in July 2015 succeeded Josep Maria Vila d'Abadal as its chair.

Following a last-minute agreement between pro-Catalan independence parties Junts pel Sí and Popular Unity Candidacy to replace Artur Mas due in part to the various alleged cases of corruption and the austerity cuts under his government, Puigdemont was elected the 130th President of Catalonia on 10 January 2016. He resigned as Mayor of Girona on 11 January 2016 as no-one is allowed to be a regional president and a municipal mayor at the same time. He was the first president of Catalonia to refuse to take the oath of loyalty to the Spanish constitution and the Spanish monarch.

=== Constitutional crisis ===
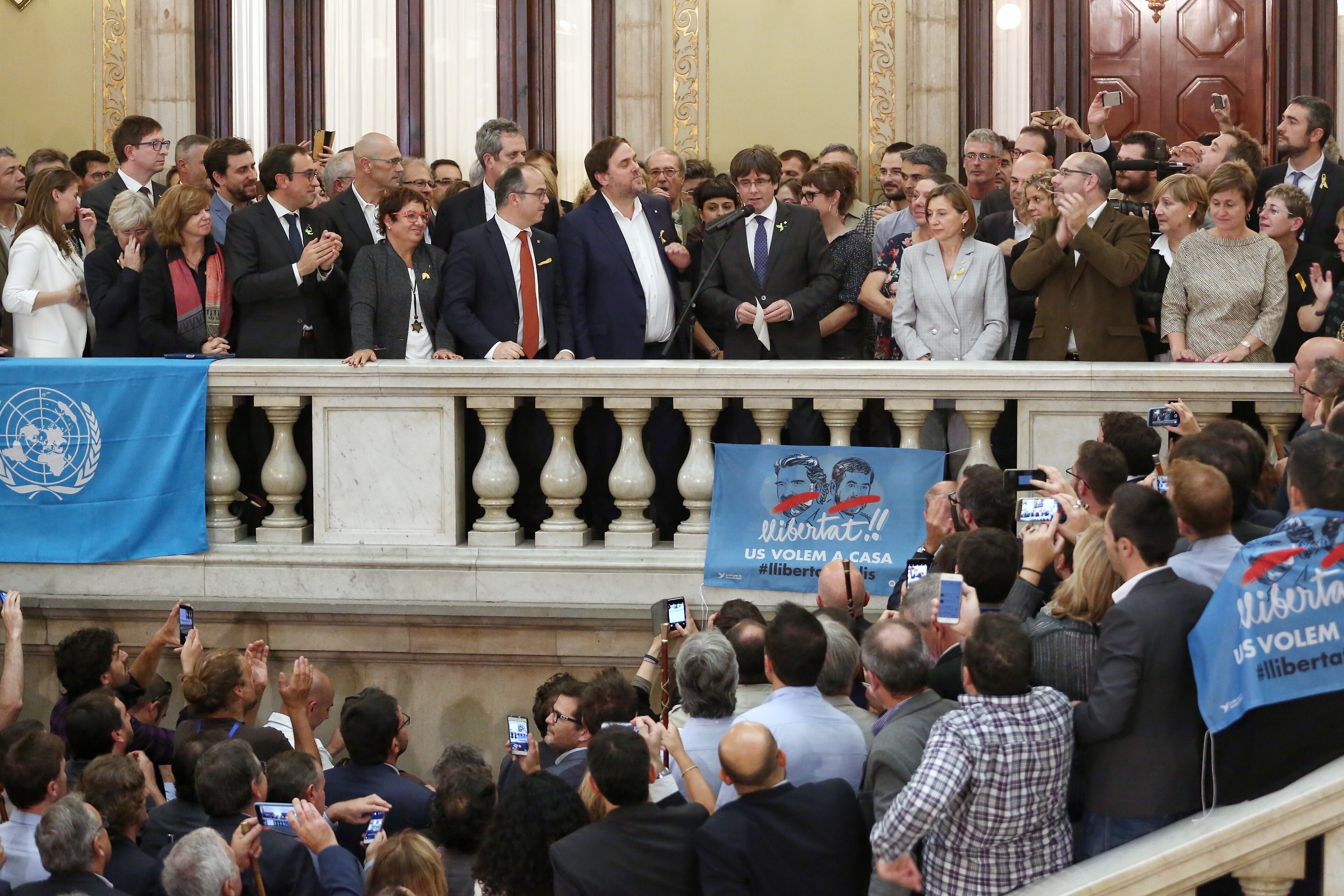
Puigdemont addresses a crowd following the Catalan declaration of independence on 27 October 2017

In June 2017 Puigdemont announced that the Catalan independence referendum would be held on 1 October 2017. The Catalan Parliament passed legislation on 6 September 2017 authorising the referendum which would be binding and based on a simple majority without a minimum threshold. The following day, the Constitutional Court of Spain suspended the legislation, blocking the referendum. The Spanish government put into effect Operation Anubis in order to disrupt the organisation of the referendum and arrested Catalan government officials. Despite this the referendum went ahead though it was boycotted by opponents of secessionism and turnout was only 43%. Among those who voted 92% supported independence. Around 900 people were injured as the Spanish police used violence to try to prevent voting in the referendum.

On 27 October 2017 the Catalan Parliament declared independence in a vote boycotted by opposition MPs. Almost immediately the Senate of Spain invoked article 155 of the constitution, dismissing Puigdemont and the Catalan government and imposing direct rule on Catalonia. The following day Spanish Prime Minister Mariano Rajoy dissolved the Catalan Parliament and called for fresh regional elections on 21 December 2017. On 30 October 2017 Spanish Attorney General José Manuel Maza laid charges of rebellion, sedition and misuse of public funds at the Audiencia Nacional against Puigdemont and other members of the Catalan government. The charges carry maximum sentences of 30, 15 and 6 years in prison respectively.

Puigdemont and five other Catalan ministers (Dolors Bassa, Meritxell Borrás, Antoni Comín, Joaquim Forn and Meritxell Serret) arrived in Belgium on 30 October 2017. According to Spanish media the group had driven to Marseille shortly after the charges were laid before the Audiencia Nacional and from there flown to Brussels. Puigdemont claimed that he had gone to "the capital of Europe" to speak from a position of "freedom and safety" and that he would not return to Spain unless he was guaranteed a fair trial. Earlier Belgium's Secretary of State for Asylum, Migration and Administrative Simplification Theo Francken had stated that the prospect of Puigdemont being granted asylum was "not unrealistic".

=== Move to Belgium ===
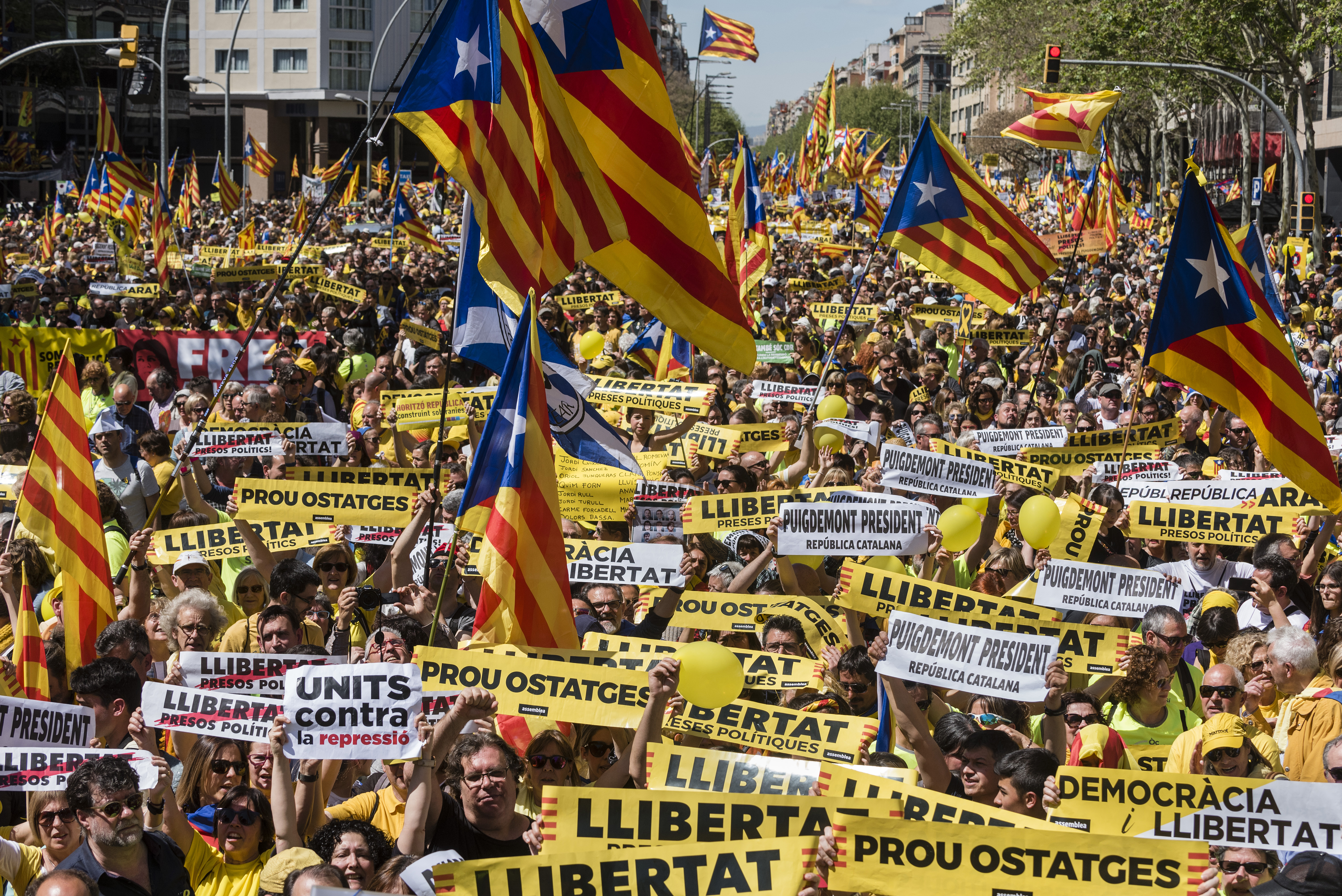
Protest march in Barcelona in support of Puigdemont on 15 April 2018

On 3 November 2017 a Spanish judge issued European Arrest Warrants against Comín, Clara Ponsatí i Obiols, Lluís Puig, Puigdemont and Serret after they failed to attend a high court hearing in Madrid the previous day. On 5 November 2017 the five politicians, accompanied by their lawyers, surrendered to the Belgian police, but after a ten-hour hearing a Belgian judge released them all on bail. They were ordered not to leave Belgium without permission and had to provide details of their accommodation. On 5 December 2017 the Supreme Court of Spain withdrew the European Arrest Warrant (EAW) against Puigdemont and four others stating that EAW were not valid for alleged crimes committed by a wider group of people, e.g. the Catalan government. But judge Pablo Llarena warned that the national arrest warrants remain valid, meaning that the group risked arrest if they returned to Spain.

==== Catalan elections ====
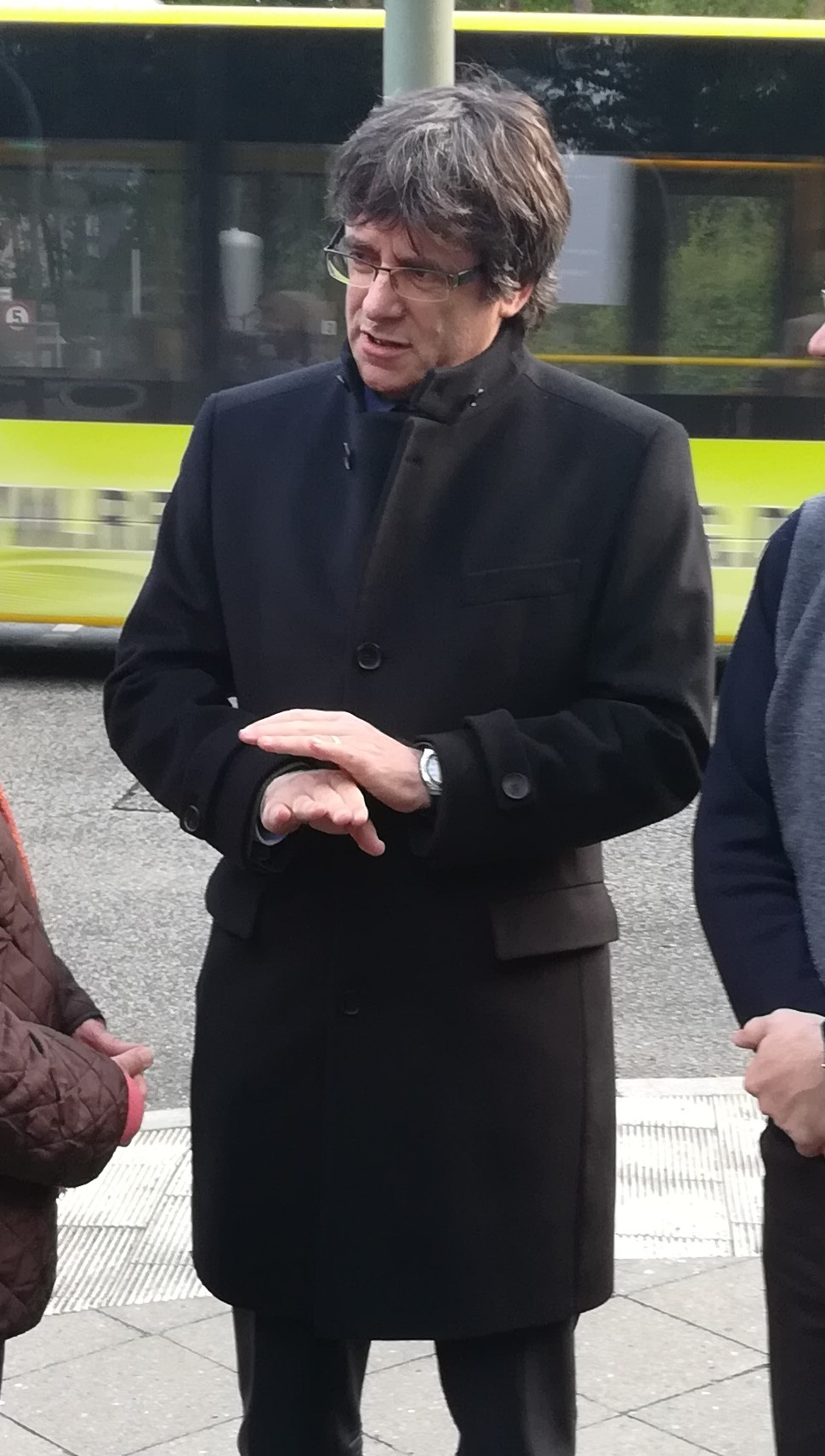
Puigdemont attending a memorial for the bombing of Guernica in Berlin on 26 April 2018

While remaining self-exiled, Puigdemont contested the 2017 regional election as a Together for Catalonia (JuntsxCat) electoral alliance candidate in the Province of Barcelona and was re-elected to Parliament. At the election Catalan secessionists retained a slim majority in the Catalan Parliament. After the election Puigdemont called for new unconditional talks with the Spanish government and that he was willing to meet Rajoy outside of Spain. Rajoy rejected the offer, saying that he was only willing to speak with the leader of the Catalan government, whom he considered to be Inés Arrimadas, leader of the unionist Citizens, the largest single party in the Catalan Parliament.

On 23 February 2018, Puigdemont's portrait was ordered to be removed from Santiago Sierra's “Contemporary Spanish Political Prisoners” exhibition in Madrid.

On 1 March 2018, Puigdemont was hoping to be selected by the Catalan Parliament as President of Catalonia again, but the Catalan Parliament heeded warnings from Spain's judiciary and postponed the session in which Puigdemont could be selected. Subsequently, Puigdemont announced that he was no longer seeking re-election as leader of Catalonia. Later he announced the creation of a government-in-exile organization named "Council of the Republic".

==== Arrest in Germany ====
On 25 March 2018, while returning to Brussels from a trip to Finland, Puigdemont was stopped in Germany near the Danish border and arrested pursuant to the European warrant that had been reissued against him two days previously. On 5 April 2018, the Oberlandesgericht (Higher State Court) in the German state of Schleswig-Holstein ruled that Puigdemont would not be extradited on charges of rebellion, and released him on bail while deliberating about the extradition on charges of misuse of public funds. According to that decision, Puigdemont was required to report to police once a week and could not leave Germany without permission of the public prosecutor.

After his release, Puigdemont called on Spain's government to release Catalan separatists from imprisonment and establish a dialog with them.

On 12 July 2018 the higher court in Schleswig-Holstein confirmed that Puigdemont could not be extradited by the crime of rebellion, but may still be extradited based on charges of misuse of public funds. Puigdemont's legal team said they would appeal any decision to extradite him. Ultimately, though, Spain dropped its European arrest warrant, ending the extradition attempt. Puigdemont was once again free to travel, and chose to return to Belgium.

In January 2019 Puigdemont filed a constitutional application for amparo directed against the president of the Catalan parliament, Roger Torrent and the Board of the Chamber. The complaint, presented to the Spanish Constitutional Court, argued Puigdemont had been denied the use of his political rights as Torrent did not allow him to delegate his vote from Belgium after Puigdemont's criminal indictment and suspension of his parliamentary condition by Supreme Court judge Pablo Llarena.

Following the April 2019 arrest of WikiLeaks founder Julian Assange inside the Ecuadorian Embassy in London, Puigdemont said that "Human rights, and especially freedom of expression, are under attack once again in Europe."

=== European elections ===
Puigdemont was placed first on the Lliures per Europa list for the 2019 European Parliament election in Spain and he was elected member of the European Parliament. However, he refused to attend the act of observance of the Spanish Constitution before the Junta Electoral Central in Madrid, a requirement to acquire a certificate as a Member of the European Parliament (MEP). The consequential absence of Puigdemont and Toni Comín in the list of certificated Spanish MEPs was communicated to them by the president of the European Parliament Antonio Tajani through a letter; the letter also explained that, therefore, he could not address them as MEPs. Puigdemont and Comín filed a request before the General Court of the European Union asking for precautionary measures against the decision of the European Parliament, which was dismissed. He spent much of the inaugural session of the European Parliament on 2 July 2019 in the German city of Kehl, across the Rhine from the seat of the European Parliament in the city of Strasbourg, located on French soil and avoided by Puigdemont. Judge Pablo Llarena has reactivated a detention order of Puigdemont both in Europe and also reactivated an international detention order of Puigdemont in October 2019.

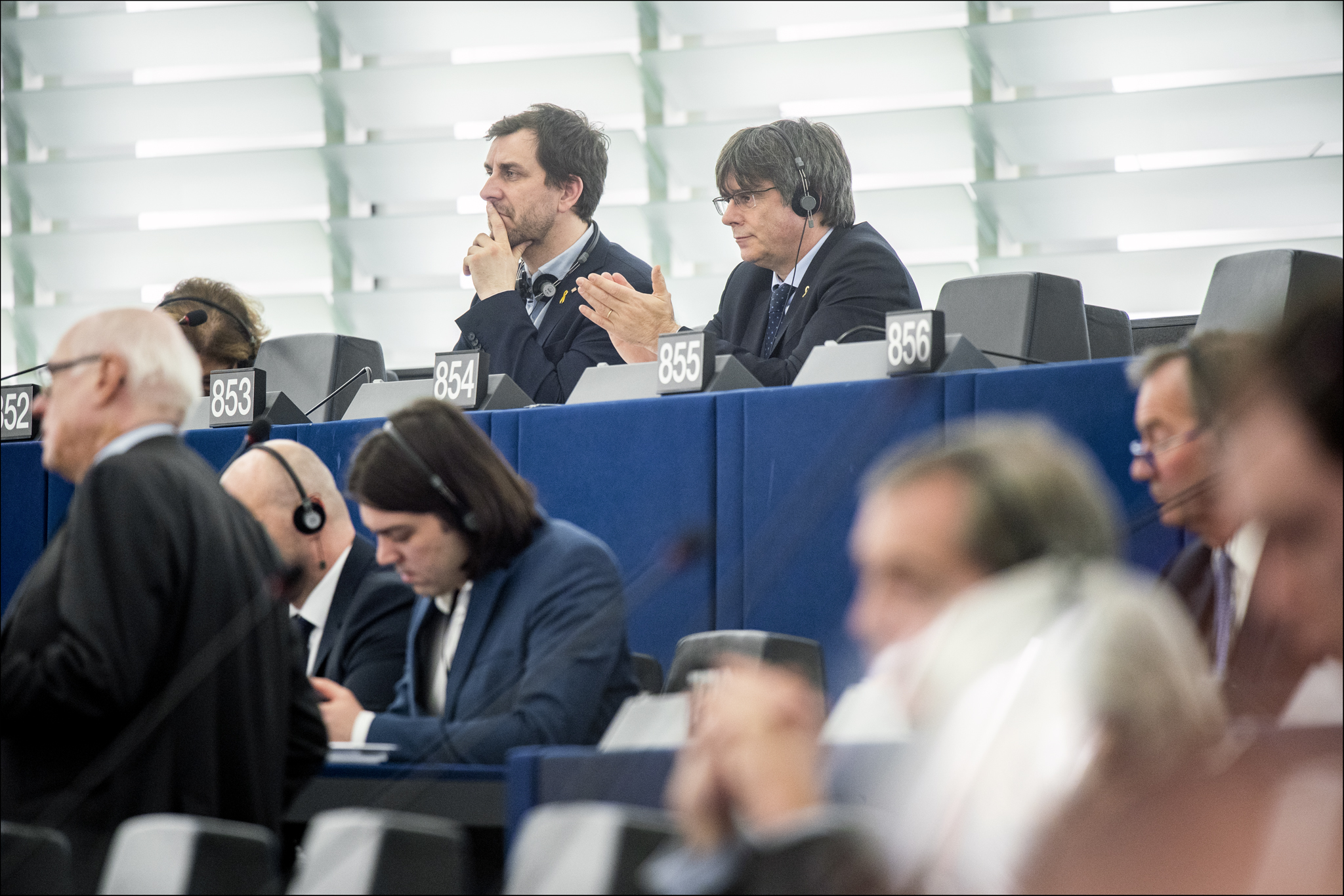
Puigdemont and Comín attending the EP session on 13 January 2020

On 20 December 2019, Puigdemont was accredited as an MEP after a ruling from the European Court of Justice said that he was permitted to take on his role as MEP.

Puigdemont and Comín attended their first EP session on 13 January 2020 as non-attached members. Puigdemont's first intervention dealt with a defense of the right of self-determination. Both MEPs asked to join the Greens–European Free Alliance (EU parliament party political group); co-president Philippe Lamberts acknowledged the group considered the request a "problem" for them and, while entertaining internal debate in order to decide on the issue, Lamberts deemed the most logical outcome would be for them to join the group to which "their best Belgian friends" (the N-VA) belong. Also in January 2020, Spanish Supreme Court judge Manuel Marchena proceeded to file an application before EP President David Sassoli in order to revoke the immunity of Puigdemont and Comín.

Later in January 2020, just hours before the scheduled internal vote among the Greens/ALE MEPs on the request filed by Puigdemont and Comín to join the Greens/ALE group, both Puigdemont and Comín withdrew their application.

On 30 April 2021, Morocco granted Puigdemont asylum. According to a source from the Moroccan foreign ministry, the decision was made in due to "the principle of reciprocity to host the Catalan independence leader" after Sahrawi President Brahim Ghali was allowed to go to Spain to get treated for COVID-19.

=== Arrest in Italy ===
On 23 September 2021, Puigdemont was arrested at the Alghero–Fertilia Airport by the Italian police after getting off a flight from Brussels. The arrest took place following a Spanish Supreme Court European Arrest Warrant issued in 2019. At a court hearing the day after his arrest, he was released without any precautionary measures, in line with the Italian prosecutor's request. The purpose of the trip was to meet with Algheresi authorities and Sardinian separatist and at the same time to attend the Aplec International in Adifolk which was to take place in the "Barceloneta of Sardinia" between 24 and 26 September.

The announcement of the arrest prompted Puigdemont to regain a prominent role and to be at the centre of the Catalan political scene. One day after his release, during a press conference Puigdemont announced that he would attend an oral hearing scheduled to take place on 4 October in the Sassari court, together with his lawyer Gonzalo Boye.

=== Catalan elections 2024 ===
On 8 August 2024, Puigdemont made a return to Spain after seven years in self-imposed exile in Belgium, delivering a defiant speech at the Arc de Triomf in Barcelona advocating for Catalonia's right to self-determination before quickly disappearing, sparking a large-scale police operation. "Holding a referendum is not and will never be a crime," Puigdemont stated, before disappearing among the crowds. The Catalan police set up roadblocks and arrested an officer whose car was reportedly used in Puigdemont's escape, raising questions about the force's involvement. This incident coincided with the investiture of Salvador Illa as the new Catalan president, marking a shift in the region's political focus from sovereignty to social issues. Puigdemont's reappearance and subsequent disappearance have further complicated the political landscape, drawing sharp criticism from opposition leaders who view the event as damaging to Spain's image. Alberto Núñez Feijóo described Puigdemont's stunt as "an unbearable humiliation", and Santiago Abascal from Vox described it as "the destruction of the state beamed live on Spanish television".

=== Application of the Amnesty Law ===
The progression of the judicial proceedings against Puigdemont between 2024 and 2026 was shaped by the entry into force of Organic Law 1/2024 on amnesty. Although the legislation was approved by the Spanish Parliament (Cortes Generales), its effective implementation was initially stalled due to an interpretation by the Supreme Court of Spain. The Court determined that the offense of misappropriation of public funds—with which Puigdemont was charged—entailed personal financial gain and caused harm directly linked to the financial interests of the European Union, thereby excluding it from the scope of the amnesty law. This judicial stance was subsequently addressed by the Court of Justice of the European Union (CJEU) in July 2026; the European court affirmed that the amnesty law was compatible with EU law, finding that the events surrounding the October 1st referendum neither posed a risk to nor directly affected the European budget. Subsequently, the Constitutional Court of Spain dismissed the appeals filed and established a binding legal doctrine that encompassed all the actions attributed to the defendant in the case. On November 3, 2026, the investigating magistrate of the Supreme Court, Pablo Llarena, nullified the indictment against Puigdemont, withdrew the arrest warrants, and declared the investigation phase closed, referring the case to the Criminal Chamber for a formal dismissal and final archiving of the proceedings.

== Ideology and positions ==
One of the founders of the youth organization of the right-of-centre Democratic Convergence of Catalonia (CDC) in the province of Girona, Puigdemont has associated himself since then with the most staunchly pro-independence faction in the party. His tenure as mayor in Girona was characterised by liberal economic policies.

In 2017, Puigdemont considered the European Union (EU) to be a "club of decadent and obsolescent countries" that was "controlled by a small few", also suggesting that Catalonia should be allowed to vote on its exit from the EU if Catalans wanted it. Although he openly supports the EU and euro, he has supported the idea that "we should work to change it". He has rejected an EU which does not protect human rights and the right of representation. He has denied being "europhobic", and he has referred to himself and his party not as eurosceptic but as "euro-demanding".

On 17 February 2022, days before the Russian invasion of Ukraine, Puigdemont did not support the package of measures designed to aid Ukraine, as issued by the European Parliament. Some of Puigdemont's aides were previously reported to have links with the Kremlin, including with Foreign Minister Sergey Lavrov. In September 2021, the European Parliament, which had previously lifted the parliamentary immunity of Puigdemont, launched a deeper investigation into the possible criminal implications of such contacts. No conclusive evidence has been presented.

In May 2024, Puigdemont pointed to the fact that Spain had decided to recognize Palestine but not Kosovo, "a country with which the European Union has diplomatic relations". He also accused Spain of helping Turkey "to suppress the Kurds". Puigdemont said that "Above all, Spain is the country that suppressed the democratic referendum of Catalonia" on 1 October 2017.

== Personal life ==
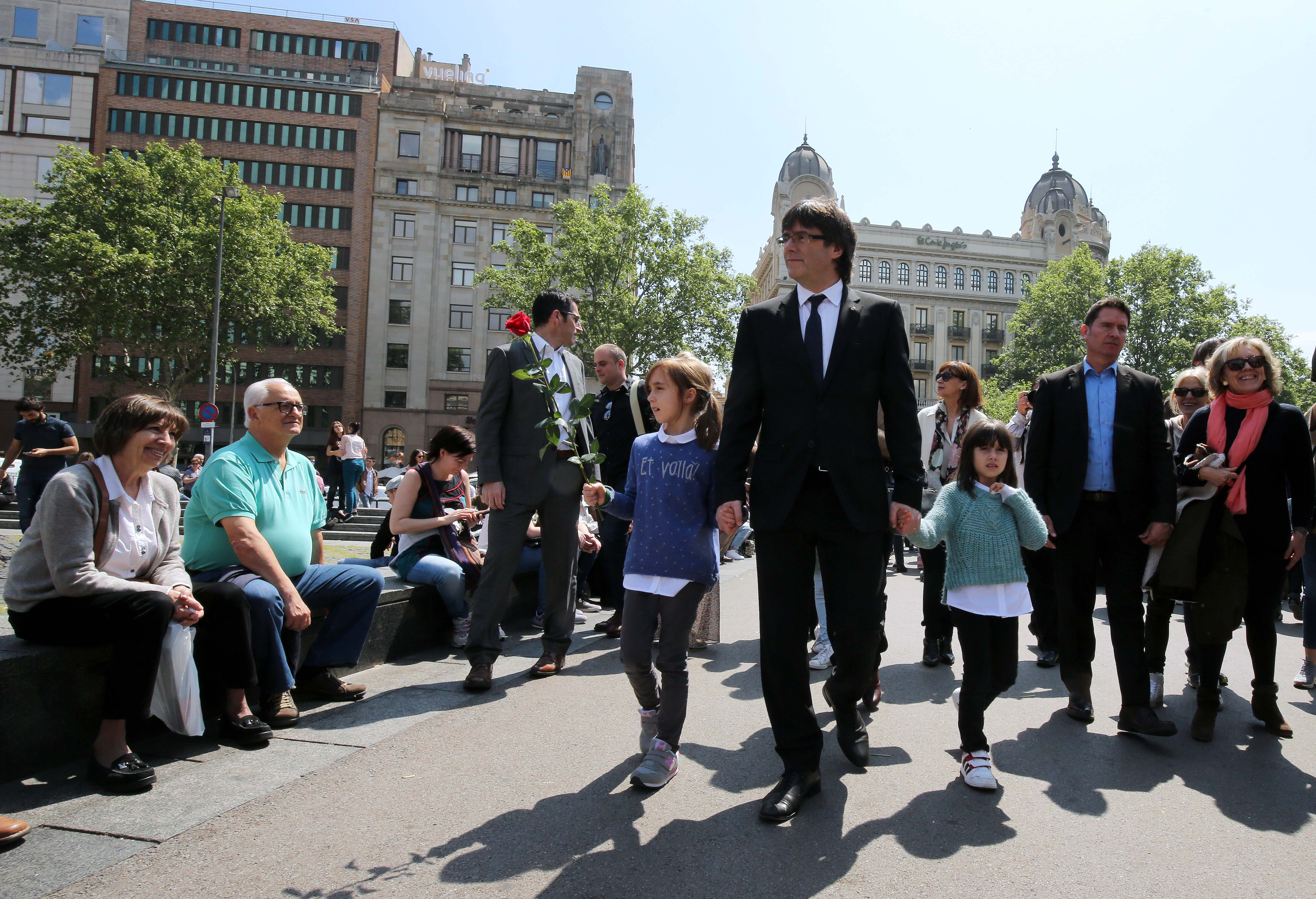
President Puigdemont walking through Barcelona with his daughters on Saint George's Day

Puigdemont married Romanian journalist Marcela Topor in 2000. They have two daughters, Magali and Maria, and were reported to be living in Girona as of 2017. He speaks Catalan, English, French, Romanian and Spanish. Puigdemont is a supporter of Girona FC and FC Barcelona and plays rock guitar and the electric piano. As a teenager Puigdemont played bass in a short-lived Catalan rock band formed about 1980.

On 2 February 2018, the Belgian commune of Waterloo confirmed that he had rented a villa and planned to establish his official residence there.

== Electoral history ==
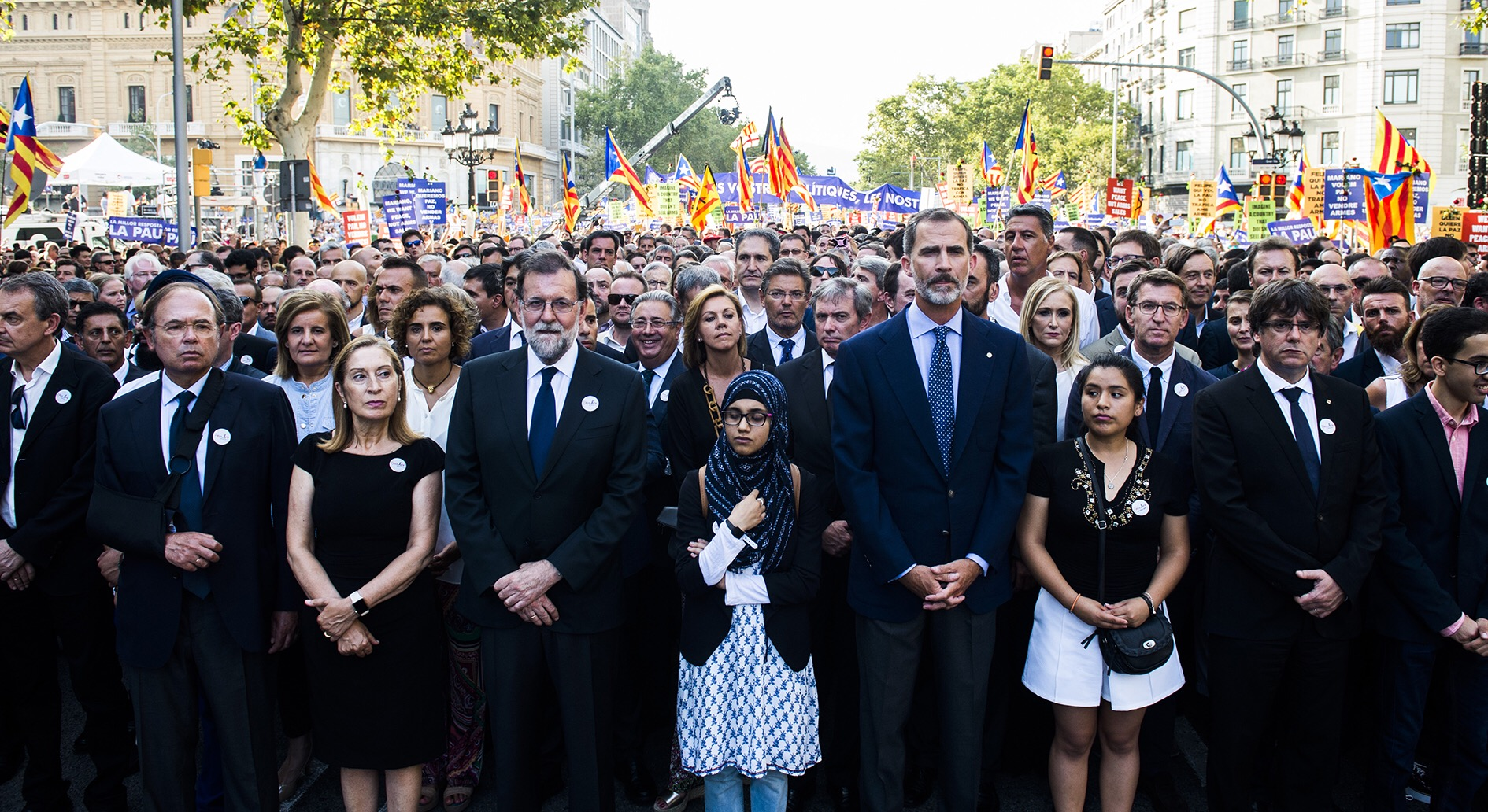
President Puigdemont, Prime Minister Rajoy and King Felipe VI attending the Barcelona rally in response to terror attacks in August 2017

Electoral history of Carles Puigdemont
Election	Constituency	Party	Alliance	No.	Result
2006 regional	Province of Girona	Democratic Convergence of Catalonia	Convergence and Union	6	Elected
2007 local	Municipality of Girona	Democratic Convergence of Catalonia	Convergence and Union	1	Elected
2010 regional	Province of Girona	Democratic Convergence of Catalonia	Convergence and Union	6	Elected
2011 local	Municipality of Girona	Democratic Convergence of Catalonia	Convergence and Union	1	Elected
2012 regional	Province of Girona	Democratic Convergence of Catalonia	Convergence and Union	3	Elected
2015 local	Municipality of Girona	Democratic Convergence of Catalonia	Convergence and Union	1	Elected
2015 regional	Province of Girona	Democratic Convergence of Catalonia	Junts pel Sí	3	Elected
2017 regional	Province of Barcelona	Catalan European Democratic Party	Together for Catalonia	1	Elected
2019 European	Spain	National Call for the Republic	Together for Catalonia	1	Elected
2024 regional	Province of Barcelona	Together for Catalonia		1	Elected

Political offices
Preceded by Anna Pagans	Mayor of Girona; 2011–2016	Succeeded by Albert Ballesta
Preceded by Artur Mas	President of the Government of Catalonia; 2016–2017	Succeeded by Quim Torra
Party political offices
Preceded by Josep Maria Vila d'Abadal	President of the Association of Municipalities for Independence; 2015–2016	Succeeded by Josep Andreu
New office	Chair of the Catalan European Democratic Party; 2017–2018	Incumbent
New office	Leader of Together for Catalonia; 2017–present	Incumbent
