= Catalonia Today =

English-language magazine published in Catalonia

- Editor: Marcela Topor
- Categories: News, current affairs, culture
- Frequency: Monthly
- Circulation: 15,000 (historical)
- Founder: Carles Puigdemont, Stephen Burgen
- Founded: 2004
- Company: El Punt Avui group
- Country: Spain (Catalonia)
- Based in: Girona / Barcelona
- Language: English
- Website: www.cataloniatoday.cat

Catalonia Today is a monthly English-language magazine and website with news of Catalonia. It has been linked from the outset with El Punt Avui group, with whom it shares content.

== History and profile ==
The project began in 2004 as a free newspaper with the momentum of journalist and politician Carles Puigdemont, and the Barcelona correspondent of The Times, Stephen Burgen. By 2010 it had a circulation of 15,000 copies and more than 4,500 subscribers.

The idea of the project was to create a newspaper about Catalonia, but in English, in order to fill the void of the market in this respect, aimed at tourists and foreign residents living in Catalonia, as well as Catalans interested in reading and improving their English. Among the collaborators are Matthew Tree, Martin Kirby, Xevi Xirgo, Joan Ventura and Emma Ansola.

In 2010, it was awarded with the Francesc Macià Memorial Award by the Josep Irla Foundation for its defense of Catalan culture and nation.

Its editor (as of 2016) is Marcela Topor, wife of founder Carles Puigdemont.
