= Matthew Tree =

British writer

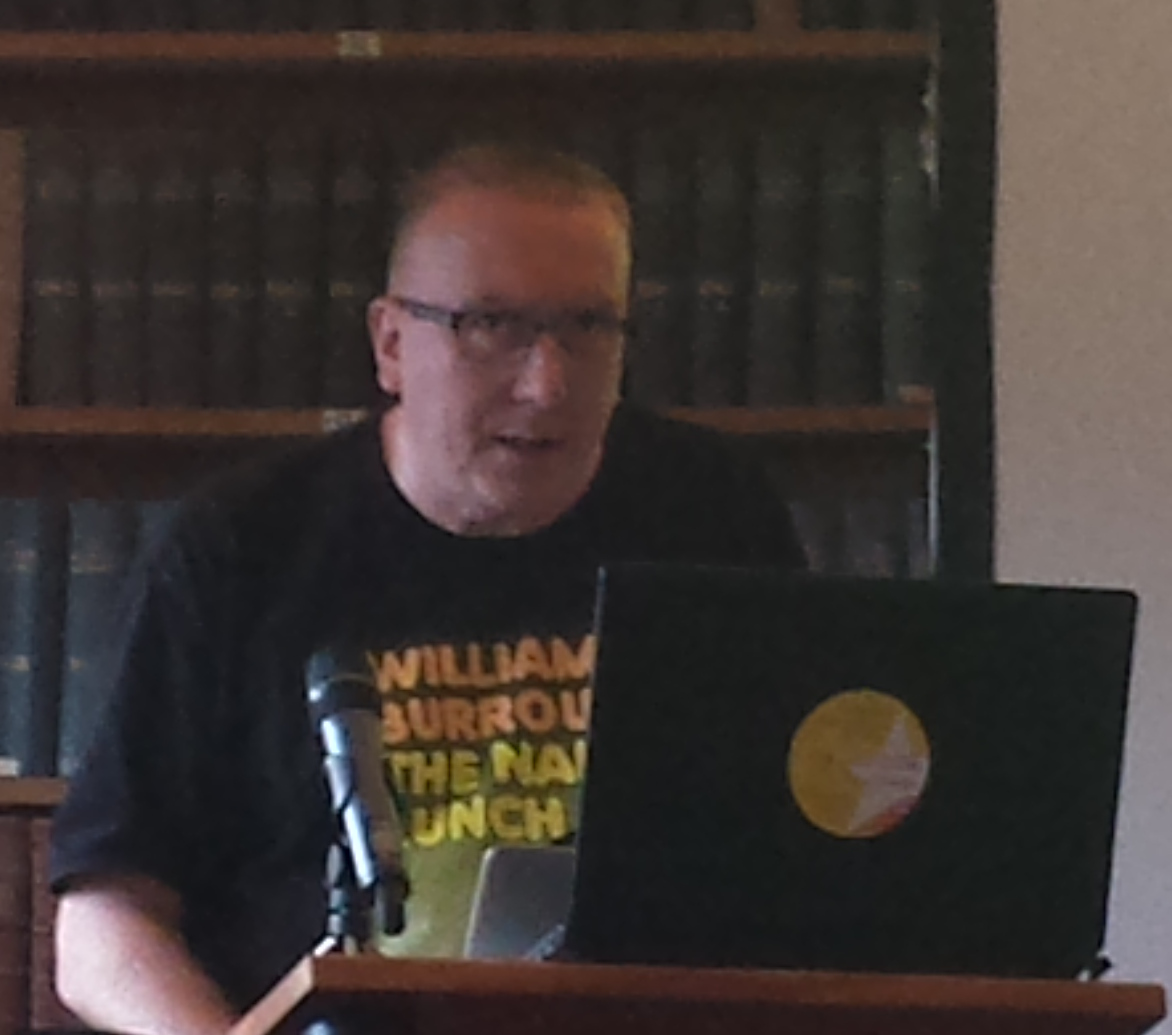
- Tree in 2014
- Born: December 30, 1958 (age 67); London
- Occupation: Writer
- Writing career
- Language: English, Catalan
- Website: www.matthewtree.cat

Matthew Tree (born December 30, 1958) is a writer in English and Catalan. He has lived in Catalonia (Barcelona and Banyoles) since 1984.

== Work ==
Apart from publishing 14 works of fiction and non-fiction written in both Catalan and English, he is a contributor to various newspapers and magazines such as Catalonia Today, The Times Literary Supplement, and El Punt Avui. He has also appeared on various Catalan language radio and TV stations. In 2005 and 2006 he scripted and presented two series of the infotainment programme Passatgers for TV3 (Catalan Public Television). He now writes scripts for and contributes to the English language cultural programme The Weekly Mag, broadcast with Catalan subtitles by La Xarxa de Comunicacions. He is currently revising one novel in English and writing another.

Politically, Tree has declared his support for Catalan independence from a left-wing point of view.

== Bibliography ==
- Fora de lloc, novel, Cafè Central-EUMO, 1996. ISBN 978-84-7602-985-5.
- Ella ve quan vol, short stories, Edicions 3i4, Octubre de Narrativa Award 1999. ISBN 978-84-7502-596-4.
- CAT. Un anglès viatja per Catalunya per veure si existeix, Ed. Columna, 2000. A road book. ISBN 978-84-8300-614-6.
- Privilegiat, novel, ed. Columna, Columna 2001 Award. ISBN 978-84-664-0141-8. Translated into Castilian from the English version: Privilegiado (Muntaner Editors, 2001).
- Memòries! 1974-1989. Dels quinze anys fins als trenta. Londres-Barcelona Autobiography. Ed. Columna, 2004. ISBN 978-84-664-0411-2.
- Contra la monarquia. Ed. Ara Llibres, 2004. An anti-monarchical diatribe.
- Aniversari. Quatre reflexions sense cap mena d'importància després de passar exactament vint anys entre els catalans. Essay on various experiences in Catalonia. Ed. Columna, 2005. Two editions.
- La puta feina. Ed. Ara Llibres, 2006. A diatribe against work. ISBN 978-84-96201-68-2.
- La vida després de Déu, Ed. Ara Llibres, 2007. An essay on religion. ISBN 978-84-96767-31-7.
- Negre de merda. El racisme explicat als blancs. An essay on racism. Ed. Columna Edicions, 2010. ISBN 978-84-6641-182-0.
- Com explicar aquest país als estrangers. Ed. Columna Edicions, 2011. ISBN 978-84-6641-359-6. A translation into Catalan of previously published articles in English, mainly about Catalonia.
- Barcelona, Catalonia. A View from the Inside. Ed. Cookwood Press, 2011. ISBN 978-16-1150-006-6. A complete collection of previously published articles and lectures in English.
- SNUG, a novel (in English). Promotional edition published by AK Digital (Antonia Kerrigan Literary Agency), 2013.
- De fora vingueren. Ed. Columna, 2016. ISBN 978-84-664-2148-5.
- No sóc racista, però...: Un manual per a persones de pell pàl·lida, an essay. Ed. Destino, 2021. ISBN 978-84-9710-322-0.
- If Only, a novel. England-Is-A-Bitch Productions, 2021. ISBN 978-8409290109.
- Just Looking, a novel. England-Is-A-Bitch Productions, 2022. ISBN 979-8366659079.
- The Last Person in the World, a novel.England-Is-A-Bitch Productions, 2023. ISBN 979-8398211672
- We'll Never Know, a novel. England-Is-A-Bitch Productions. ISBN 979-8873533862.
- Gairebé tot. La història desconeguda del pare. Non-fiction, based on his father's recently discovered diaries. (Barcelona, Columna Edicions, 2026. ISBN 9788466435222
  - He has also contributed short stories and essays to over a dozen different anthologies.
