= Marta Madrenas i Mir =

Spanish politician and lawyer

Marta Madrenas MP
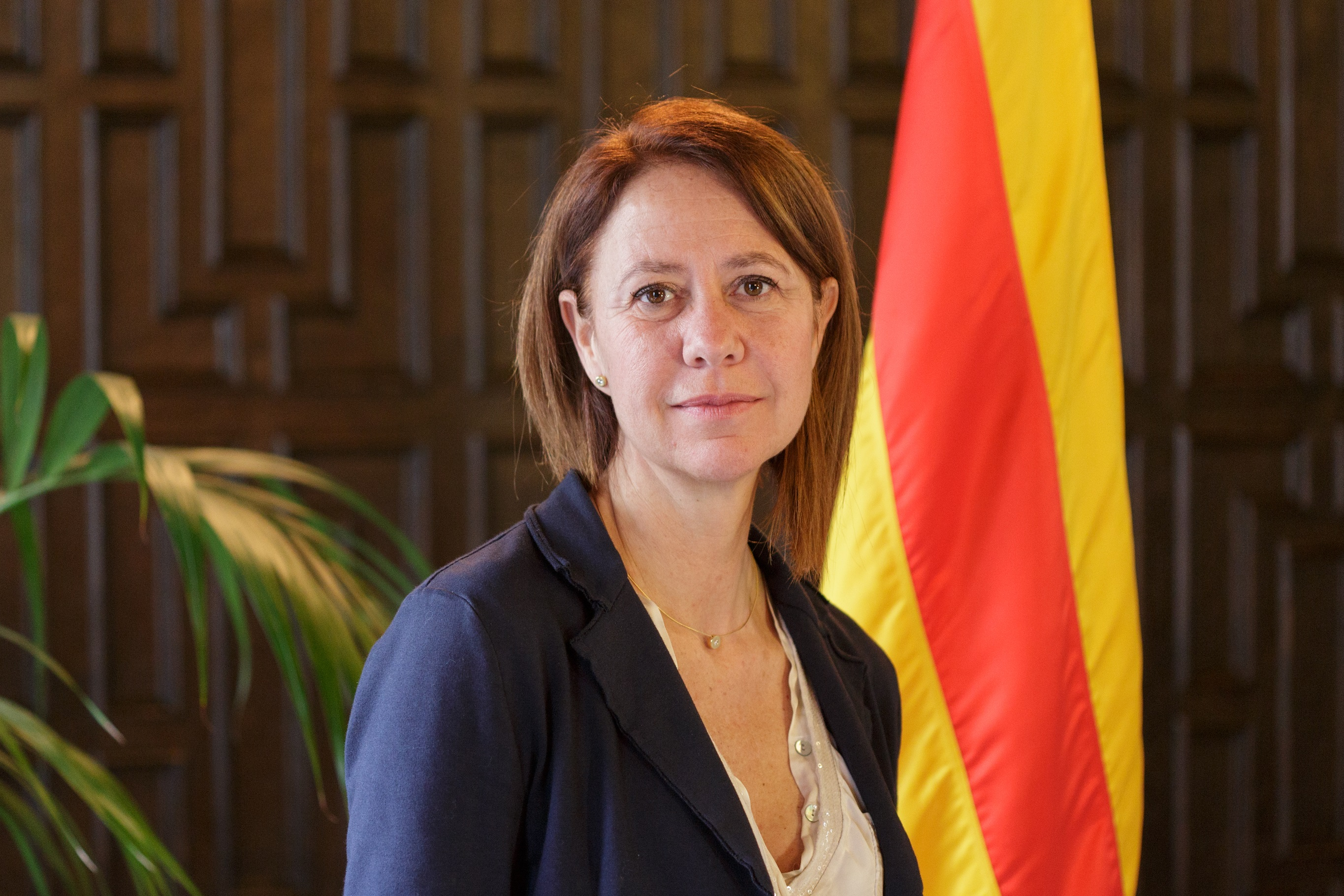

Mayor of Girona
- In office 18 March 2016 – 17 June 2023
- Preceded by: Albert Ballesta i Tura
- Succeeded by: Lluc Salellas

Member of the Congress of Deputies
- Incumbent
- Assumed office 17 August 2023
- Constituency: Girona

Personal details
- Born: Marta Madrenas i Mir; 1 November 1967 (age 58) Girona, Catalonia, Spain
- Party: Junts (since 2020)
- Other political affiliations: CDC (until 2016); PDeCAT (2016–2017); JxCat (2017–2020)
- Occupation: Politician and lawyer

Marta Madrenas i Mir (born 1 November 1967) is a Spanish politician and lawyer from Catalonia. She was mayor of Girona from 2016 to 2023.

In 17 January 2018 she became a member of the Parliament of Catalonia in the 12th term of office for the electoral coalition Together for Catalonia.

In the 2023 Spanish general election, she was elected to the 15th Congress of Deputies from Girona.

== Career ==
Madrenas has a degree in law from the Autonomous University of Barcelona (UAB) and, after completing her higher education, from 2003 to 2010 she was president of the Girona Property Agents' Association and vice-president of the Catalan Council of COAPI.

She is a member of the Democratic Convergence of Catalonia party (CDC). During Carles Puigdemont's term as mayor, she became his trusted auxiliary, appearing as his representative during neighbourhood disputes. In 2011, Puigdemont signed her up to be number three on the list for the Municipal Elections for Girona City Council. After winning the elections, she became the second deputy mayor of Economic Promotion and Employment.

In January 2016, after the sudden investiture of Carles Puigdemont as the new president of the Generalitat of Catalonia, Albert Ballesta became the new mayor of the city and Madrenas continued to head his posts in the city council but adding to them the competence of town planning. Less than three months later, Albert Ballesta resigned due to the problems he had in reaching agreements with the other parties to approve him as mayor. Madrenas became the new mayor of Girona on March 18. In May 2019, Madrenas was elected mayor of Girona for a second term.
