= List of mayors of Girona =

This is a list of the mayors of Girona, Spain from 1814.

- Marià Berga (1814)
- Narcís de Foixà (1814–1820)
- Francesc de Delàs (1820–1821)
- Francesc de Camps i Font (1821–1822)
- Josep Antoni de Ferrer (1822–1823)
- Valentí Comas (1823–1836)
- Joan Danís (1836)
- Narcís de Camps (1836–1838)
- Narcís Germen (1838)
- Marià Camps i de Niubò (1838)
- Baldiri Simon (1838–1839)
- Francesc Camps i Roger (1839–1840)
- Antoni Martí i Serra (1840)
- Francesc Camps i Roger (1840)
- Marià Camps i de Niubò (1840–1841)
- Narcís Sicars (1841)
- Joan Urgell (1841–1842)
- Joan Martell Domènech (1842)
- Tomàs Narcís Blanch (1842)
- Ramon Contreras (1842)
- Joan Martell Domènech (1842–1843)
- Marquès de la Torre (1843–1844)
- Josep de Caramany (1844–1846)
- Ventura Mercader (1846–1854)
- Josep Coll (1854)
- Joan Balari (1854–1856)
- Marià Hernández (1856–1862)
- Joaquim Rigau (1862–1863)
- Ignasi Bassols (1863–1866)
- Pere Viñas (1866–1867)
- Joaquim de Cors i Guinart (1867–1868)
- Francesc López Martínez (Corregidor) (1868)
- Pere Barragán i García (Progressist) (1868–1869)
- Joaquim Massaguer i Vidal (Progressist) (1869–1872)
- Pere Barragán i García (Liberal) (1872–1873)
- Joaquim Riera i Bertran (Federal) (1873)
- Narcís Farró i Albert (Federal) (1873)
- Josep Prats i Font (Federal) (1873)
- Ignasi Bassols i de Rovira (1873–1874)
- Pere Gahit i Vié (1874–1875)
- Marià de Camps i de Feliu (1875–1877)
- Josep Mollera i Calvet (1877–1880)
- Pere Grahit i Vié (1880–1881)
- Martí Coll i Lliura (1881–1882)
- Joan Romaní i Miguel (1882–1883)
- Francesc de P. Massa i Vall·llosera (1883–1885)
- Andreu Tuyet i Santamaria (1885–1886)
- Francesc de P. Massa i Vall·llosera (1886–1887)
- Emili Grahit i Papell (1887–1891)
- Agustí Garriga i Mundet (1891)
- Andreu Tuyet Santamaria (1891–1892)
- Francesc de Ciurana i Hernández (1892–1895)
- Joaquim d'Espona i de Nuix (1895–1897)
- Antoni Boxa i Bagué (1897–1899)
- Manuel Català i Calzada (1899–1904)
- Francesc de Ciurana i Hernández (1904–1906)
- Frederic Bassols i Costa (1906–1907)
- Manuel Català i Calzada (1907–1909)
- Francesc Montsalvatge i Fossas (Lliga) (1909)
- Francesc de Ciurana i Hernández (1909–1910)
- Artur Vallès i Rigau (1910–1914)
- Francesc Coll i Turbau (1914–1916)
- Lluís de Llobet i de Pastors (1916–1917)
- Frederic Bassols i Costa (1917)
- Albert de Quintana i Serra (Lliga) (1917–1918)
- Frederic Bassols i Costa (1918–1920)
- Albert de Quintana i Serra (Lliga) (1920–1921)
- Francesc Coll i Turbau (Lliga) (1921–1923)
- Frederic Bassols i Costa (1923)
- Lluís de Puig i Viladevall (1923–1924)
- Joan Tarrús i Bru (1924)
- Jaume Bartrina i Mas (1924–1925)
- Frederic Bassols i Costa (1925–1927)
- Jaume Bartrina i Mas (1927–1930)
- Joaquim Tordera i Girbau (Republican) (1930)
- Francesc Coll i Turbau (Lliga) (1930–1931)
- Miquel Santaló i Parvorell (ERC) (1931–1934)
- Josep Maria Dalmau i Casademont (ERC) (1934)
- Francesc Tomàs i Martín (Lliga) (1934–1936)
- Llorenç Busquets i Ventura (ERC) (1936)
- Expedit Duran i Fernández (CNT) (1936–1937)
- Llorenç Busquets i ventura (ERC) (1937)
- Pere Cerezo i Hernáez (ERC) (1937–1939)
- Joan Ballesta i Molinas (PSUC) (1939)
- Joan Tarrús i Bru (1939)
- Albert de Quintana i Vergés (1939–1946)
- Antoni Franquet i Alemany (1946–1957)
- Joan Maria de Ribot i de Balle (1957)
- Pere Ordis i Llach (1957–1967)
- Josep Bonet i Cufí (1967–1972)
- Ignasi de Ribot i de Balle (1972–1979)
- Joaquim Nadal (PSC-PSOE) (1979–2002)
- Anna Pagans i Gruartmoner (PSC-PSOE) (2002–2011)
- Carles Puigdemont (CiU) (2011–2016)
- Isabel Muradàs Vázquez (Demòcrates) (Interim, 2016)
- Albert Ballesta Tura (CDC) (Interim, 2016)
- Eduard Berloso Ferrer (Demòcrates) (Interim, 2016)
- Marta Madrenas i Mir (Junts) (2016–2023)
- Lluc Salellas i Vilar (Guanyem Girona) (2023–present)
