= Catalan News Agency =

News agency owned by the Catalan government

- Industry: News agency
- Founded: 1999; 27 years ago
- Headquarters: Barcelona, Catalonia, Spain
- Key people: Iu Forn director
- Number of employees: 50+
- Parent: Intracatalònia (Government of Catalonia)
- Website: www.catalannews.com

The Catalan News Agency (CNA, in Catalan: Agència Catalana de Notícies (ACN)) is a news agency owned by the Catalan government via the public corporation Intracatalònia, SA. It is one of the first digital news agencies created in Europe and has been operating since 1999. It is a pioneer in the use of Information technology, remote work and decentralised organisation applied to a virtual journalistic environment.

The CNA (headquartered in Barcelona) currently employs over 80 professionals and has branches in Berlin, Brussels, London, Madrid, New York City and Paris. Furthermore, it shares information with other state-owned agencies and is a member of ANSAmed, the group of Mediterranean agencies. The CNA offers its informative contents in text, photographic, video and audio formats to over 250 different subscribers, such as television channels, radio channels, the press, the digital press, institutions and businesses. 70% of Intracatalònia, SA is owned by the Catalan government, with the Corporació Catalana de Mitjans Audiovisuals as a minority shareholder, which is also owned by the Catalan government.
