= Ludic Theatre =

Romanian youth theatre company

Ludic Student Theatre
- Teatrul Studențesc Ludic (Romanian)
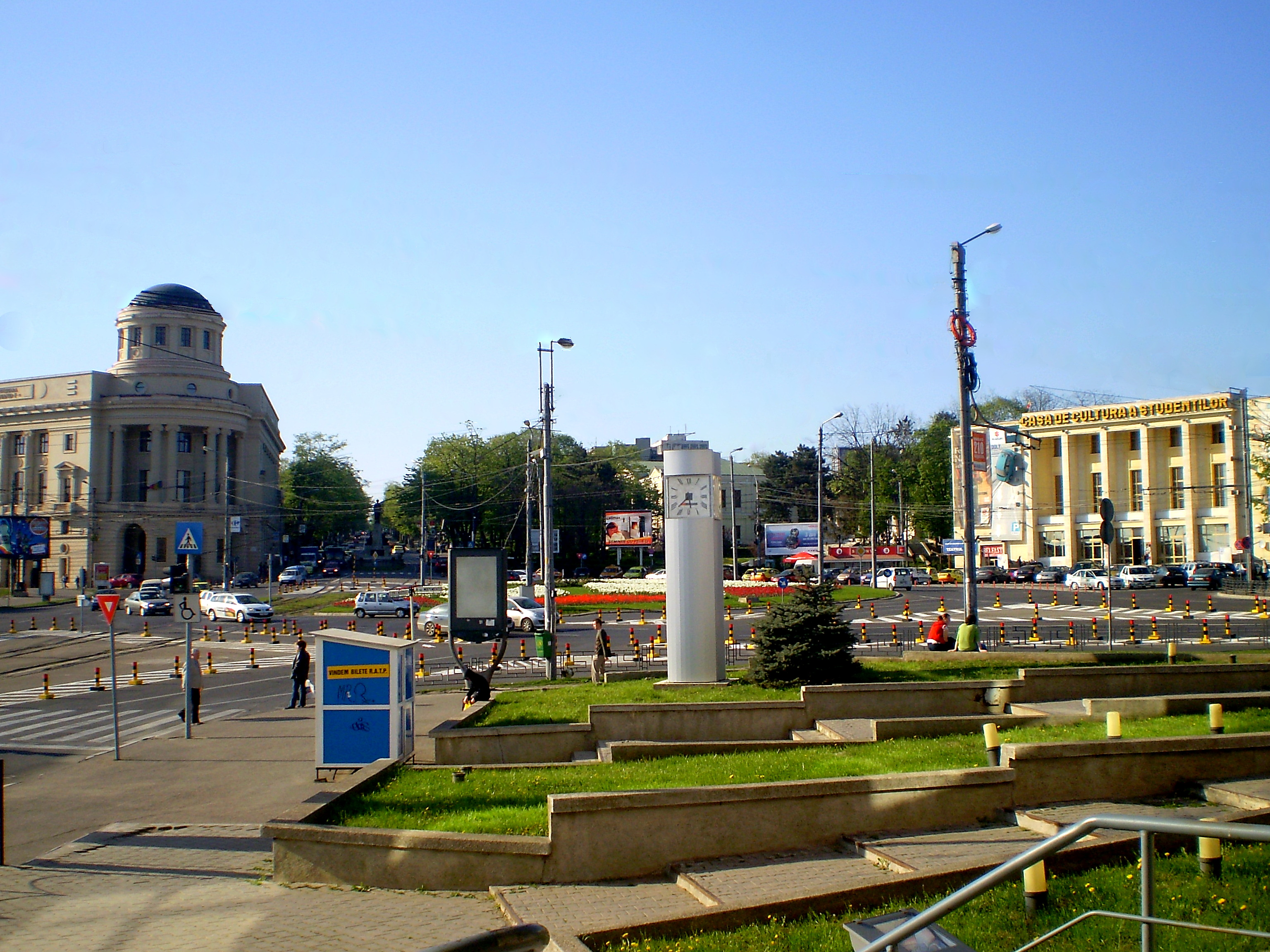
- Mihai Eminescu Square with the Students' Culture House on the right side
- Address: Iași; Romania
- Operator: Iași Students' Culture House
- Capacity: 477 seats

Ludic Student Theatre (Romanian: Teatrul Studențesc Ludic) is a theatre company in Iași, Romania, specializing in plays for young audiences. The company is hosted by the Iași Students' Culture House.

== History ==
Ludic Theatre was founded in 1978, by the stage director Aurel Luca. During the time, it participated in more than 75 international festivals, and won around 500 trophies and diplomas. It is the first Romanian theatre that joined the International Amateur Theatre Association, in 1993.

Starting 2008, each year in December, the company organises the international "Ludic Theatre Days Festival" (Romanian: "Zilele Teatrului Ludic").
