= Opinion polling for the 2023 Spanish general election =

In the run up to the 2023 Spanish general election, various organisations carried out opinion polling to gauge voting intention in Spain during the term of the 14th Cortes Generales. Results of such polls are displayed in this article. The date range for these opinion polls is from the previous general election, held on 10 November 2019, to the day the next election was held, on 23 July 2023.

Voting intention estimates refer mainly to a hypothetical Congress of Deputies election. Polls are listed in reverse chronological order, showing the most recent first and using the dates when the survey fieldwork was done, as opposed to the date of publication. Where the fieldwork dates are unknown, the date of publication is given instead. The highest percentage figure in each polling survey is displayed with its background shaded in the leading party's colour. If a tie ensues, this is applied to the figures with the highest percentages. The "Lead" columns on the right shows the percentage-point difference between the parties with the highest percentages in a poll.

== Electoral polling ==
=== Nationwide polling ===
==== Graphical summary ====
Local regression trend line of poll results from 10 November 2019 to 23 July 2023, with each line corresponding to a political party.

==== Voting intention estimates ====
The table below lists nationwide voting intention estimates. Refusals are generally excluded from the party vote percentages, while question wording and the treatment of "don't know" responses and those not intending to vote may vary between polling organisations. When available, seat projections determined by the polling organisations are displayed below (or in place of) the percentages in a smaller font; 176 seats were required for an absolute majority in the Congress of Deputies.

===== 2023 (Jun–Jul) =====
Color key:

Poll conducted after legal ban on opinion polls

Polling firm/Commissioner	Fieldwork date	Sample size	Turnout	PSOE	PP	Vox	Sumar	ERC	Junts	PNV	EH Bildu	CUP	CCa	BNG	UPN	EV	Lead
2023 general election	23 Jul	—N/a	66.6	31.7; 121	33.1; 137	12.4; 33	12.3; 31	1.9; 7	1.6; 7	1.1; 5	1.4; 6	0.4; 0	0.5; 1	0.6; 1	0.2; 1	0.1; 0	1.4
Ipsos	22 Jul	?	?	28.6; 106	34.4; 144	11.8; 31	13.5; 36	2.2 ?	1.6 ?	1.4 ?	1.3 ?	0.4 ?	0.3 ?	0.6 ?	0.2 ?	–	5.8
GESOP/Prensa Ibérica	20–22 Jul	1,200	?	28.8; 109/113	31.9; 133/137	13.1; 34/38	14.2; 36/40	? 9/10	? 7/8	–	–	–	–	–	–	–	3.1
Sondaxe/La Voz de Galicia	18–22 Jul	?	?	? 111/117	? 138/146	? 27/31	? 32/36	? 8	? 8/9	? 6	? 4/6	? 1	? 0/1	? 2	–	? 0/1	?
Target Point/El Debate	14–22 Jul	?	?	27.9; 109/113	37.5; 153/158	11.1; 25/28	12.3; 26/30	–	–	–	–	–	–	–	–	–	9.6
SocioMétrica/El Español	11–22 Jul	6,000	?	29.1; 109/115	32.4; 134/140	13.8; 35/39	13.0; 32/35	2.0; 7/8	1.8; 7/8	1.4; 6	1.3; 5/6	0.6; 1	0.4; 1	0.9; 2	0.1; 0/1	0.2; 0/1	3.3
GAD3/Mediaset	10–22 Jul	10,004	?	28.6; 109/115	35.5; 147/153	12.7; 29/33	11.9; 25/29	2.2; 8	1.9; 7	1.5; 5	1.3; 6	0.6; 1	0.4; 1	0.8; 2	–	–	6.9
SigmaDos/RTVE–FORTA	6–22 Jul	17,550	?	28.9; 113/118	34.2; 145/150	11.2; 24/27	13.3; 28/31	2.7; 9	2.3; 9	1.7; 5	1.6; 6	0.7; 1	0.4; 1	0.5; 1/2	–	0.1; 0/1	5.3
GESOP/The Adelaide Review	19–21 Jul	1,200	70–72	28.5; 106/110	32.7; 134/138	13.0; 35/39	14.0; 36/40	2.1; 8/9	1.5; 7/8	–	–	–	–	–	–	–	4.2
40dB/Prisa	18–21 Jul	2,000	?	29.4; 106/120	31.7; 122/136	13.8; 38/42	13.8; 36/39	? 8	? 7	? 6	? 5	? 1	? 1	? 1	? 0	? 1	2.3
Metroscopia	17–21 Jul	3,000	?	28.4; 99/112	35.3; 141/153	13.1; 31/39	11.9; 23/32	2.0; 7/9	1.9; 7/8	1.3; 5/6	1.1; 5/7	0.6; 0/1	0.3; 1	0.7; 1/2	0.2; 0/1	0.1; 0/1	6.9
GESOP/The Adelaide Review	18–20 Jul	1,200	70–72	29.0; 109/114	32.0; 130/134	13.0; 36/40	14.0; 36/40	2.0; 8/9	1.8; 7/8	–	–	–	–	–	–	–	3.0
GESOP/The Adelaide Review	17–19 Jul	1,200	?	28.5; 107/111	31.5; 129/133	13.5; 36/40	14.0; 36/40	2.2; 8/9	1.8; 7/8	–	–	–	–	–	–	–	3.0
YouGov	18 Jul	?	?	29.0; 118	32.0; 133	14.0; 39	14.0; 32	2.0; 7	2.0; 8	1.3; 4	1.0; 6	–	–	<1.0; 1	–	–	3.0
GESOP/The Adelaide Review	16–18 Jul	1,200	?	27.5; 105/109	31.0; 128/132	14.3; 38/42	14.2; 36/40	2.2; 8/9	1.8; 7/8	–	–	–	–	–	–	–	3.5
KeyData/Público	17 Jul	?	68.0	28.0; 107	34.7; 146	12.9; 32	12.8; 31	2.3; 9	2.0; 8	1.4; 5	1.4; 6	0.7; 1	? 1	? 2	? 1	? 1	6.7
Data10/Okdiario	17 Jul	1,500	?	27.5; 110	36.0; 152	12.5; 29	12.5; 28	2.1; 8	2.0; 8	–	–	–	–	–	–	–	8.5
EM-Analytics/Electomanía	16–17 Jul	1,873	?	28.8; 106	34.5; 142	12.9; 35	13.4; 34	2.1; 7	1.8; 8	1.4; 6	1.6; 6	0.7; 1	0.2; 0	1.0; 2	0.2; 1	0.2; 2	5.7
AtlasIntel	15–17 Jul	2,974	?	29.4	30.8	17.0	16.1	1.3	1.5	0.7	1.7	0.3	–	–	–	–	1.4
GESOP/The Adelaide Review	15–17 Jul	1,200	?	28.0; 106/110	30.3; 124/128	14.6; 41/45	14.4; 37/40	2.3; 8/9	1.8; 7/8	–	–	–	–	–	–	–	2.3
Sigma Dos/El Mundo	10–17 Jul	8,183	71.3	28.0; 105/110	35.4; 145/150	11.2; 26/29	13.6; 33/36	2.6; 9/10	2.4; 9/10	1.1; 5	1.0; 6	? 1	? 1	? 0/1	–	? 0/1	7.4
YouGov	6–17 Jul	10,807	?	28.0; 106/123	32.0; 124/144	14.0; 36/48	14.0; 29/38	2.0; 7/9	2.0; 6/8	1.0; 4/6	1.0; 4/7	–	–	1.0; 0/2	–	–	4.0
GAD3/ABC	29 Jun–17 Jul	8,001	71	28.6; 115	36.9; 152	11.7; 28	11.5; 24	2.3; 9	2.0; 8	1.3; 5	1.3; 6	0.5; 1	0.4; 0	0.6; 1	0.1; 0	0.1; 1	8.3
NC Report/La Razón	15–16 Jul	1,000	66.7	28.3; 106/109	37.2; 153/156	11.1; 26/28	11.3; 25/27	2.4; 9/10	2.1; 8/9	1.5; 6	1.4; 6	0.7; 1	–	–	–	–	8.9
Data10/Okdiario	14–16 Jul	1,500	?	26.6; 107	35.6; 148	13.1; 32	12.7; 31	–	–	–	–	–	–	–	–	–	9.0
Sondaxe/La Voz de Galicia	12–16 Jul	1,000	?	28.7; 109	34.3; 141	12.5; 29	14.0; 37	? 10	? 8	? 6	? 5	? 1	? 1	? 2	? 0	? 1	5.6
40dB/Prisa	12–16 Jul	2,000	?	28.7; 106/113	32.9; 131/139	13.5; 37/40	13.7; 35/39	? 8	? 8	? 5	? 6	? 1	? 1	? 1	? 0	? 1	4.2
Simple Lógica/elDiario.es	11–16 Jul	1,600	?	28.6; 106/114	32.2; 130/138	13.9; 34/40	13.8; 33/39	–	–	–	–	–	–	–	–	–	3.6
SocioMétrica/El Español	11–16 Jul	1,500	?	28.3; 107	33.5; 143	13.7; 37	13.2; 33	2.3; 9	1.8; 7	1.4; 5	1.3; 6	0.6; 1	0.4; 1	0.8; 1	–	–	5.2
Target Point/El Debate	8–16 Jul	?	?	28.1; 107/109	36.4; 150/152	12.4; 31/33	12.1; 29/31	–	–	–	–	–	–	–	–	–	8.3
GAD3/ABC	29 Jun–16 Jul	7,002	71	28.4; 115	37.0; 151	11.9; 29	11.5; 25	2.3; 8	2.0; 8	1.3; 5	1.3; 6	0.5; 1	0.4; 0	0.5; 1	0.1; 0	0.1; 1	8.6
EM-Analytics/Electomanía	15 Jul	?	?	28.6; 105	34.7; 142	13.0; 36	13.2; 34	? 7	? 8	? 6	? 6	? 1	? 0	? 2	? 1	? 2	6.1
NC Report/La Razón	14–15 Jul	1,000	?	28.3; 104/106	37.1; 153/155	11.3; 28/30	11.1; 27/29	2.4; 9/10	2.1; 8/9	1.5; 6	1.5; 6	0.7; 1/2	–	–	–	–	8.8
GESOP/Prensa Ibérica	13–15 Jul	1,200	?	27.4; 104/108	30.6; 126/130	15.0; 44/48	14.4; 37/40	2.1; 8/9	1.7; 7/8	–	–	–	–	–	–	–	3.2
Data10/Okdiario	13–15 Jul	1,500	?	27.0; 108	35.7; 149	12.9; 31	12.7; 30	–	–	–	–	–	–	–	–	–	8.7
Sondaxe/La Voz de Galicia	11–15 Jul	1,000	69.9	28.4; 107	34.3; 140	12.6; 33	14.2; 37	? 9	? 8	? 5	? 6	? 1	? 1	? 2	? 0	? 1	5.9
40dB/Prisa	11–15 Jul	2,000	?	28.1; 100/112	32.6; 130/141	14.2; 38/43	13.9; 37/39	? 8	? 8	? 5	? 6	? 1	? 1	? 1	? 0	? 1	4.5
Sigma Dos/El Mundo	9–15 Jul	5,622	70.9	28.3; 106/110	35.0; 146/149	11.8; 28/30	13.2; 33/35	2.7; 9/10	2.5; 9/10	1.1; 5	1.0; 6	? 1	? 1	? 0/1	–	? 0/1	6.7
Target Point/El Debate	7–15 Jul	?	?	28.5; 108/110	36.3; 150/152	12.3; 31/33	11.8; 28/30	–	–	–	–	–	–	–	–	–	7.8
GAD3/ABC	29 Jun–15 Jul	6,501	71	28.5; 113/117	37.2; 149/154	11.7; 28/30	11.4; 25	2.3; 8	2.0; 8	1.2; 5	1.3; 6	0.5; 1	0.4; 0	0.5; 1	0.1; 0	0.1; 0/1	8.7
EM-Analytics/Electomanía	14 Jul	813	?	29.3; 108	34.7; 143	12.8; 34	13.1; 34	1.9; 7	1.7; 7	1.3; 5	1.6; 6	0.7; 1	0.3; 0	1.0; 2	0.3; 1	0.2; 2	5.4
NC Report/La Razón	13–14 Jul	1,000	62.9	28.0; 103/105	36.8; 152/154	11.7; 29/31	11.4; 28/30	2.4; 9/10	2.1; 8/9	1.5; 6	1.5; 6/7	0.7; 1/2	–	–	–	–	8.8
Cluster17/El Grand Continent	12–14 Jul	?	?	28.9; 108	33.6; 136	13.7; 37	13.5; 35	2.3; 9	2.3; 9	1.1; 5	1.3; 5	0.7; 1	0.3; 1	0.8; 2	0.3; 1	0.5; 1	4.7
Data10/Okdiario	12–14 Jul	1,500	?	26.6; 105	35.6; 148	13.1; 32	12.8; 31	–	–	–	–	–	–	–	–	–	9.0
IMOP/El Confidencial	11–14 Jul	1,843	?	28.2; 98/108	32.9; 134/142	14.5; 38/42	12.8; 31/34	2.2; 8/9	2.0; 8/9	1.4; 6	1.2; 6	0.8; 1	0.3; 0/1	0.9; 2	0.2; 1	0.1; 1/2	4.7
InvyMark/laSexta	10–14 Jul	?	?	26.3	33.5	13.8	13.7	–	–	–	–	–	–	–	–	–	7.2
Sondaxe/La Voz de Galicia	10–14 Jul	1,000	?	28.1; 106	34.1; 139	12.3; 33	14.8; 39	? 9	? 9	? 5	? 6	? 0	? 1	? 2	? 0	? 1	6.0
40dB/Prisa	10–14 Jul	2,000	?	28.3; 102/114	32.0; 126/138	14.6; 38/44	13.8; 38/39	? 8	? 8	? 5	? 6	? 1	? 1	? 1	? 0	? 1	3.7
Sigma Dos/El Mundo	8–14 Jul	4,715	71.0	27.9; 104/107	34.6; 145/148	12.4; 34/36	13.1; 34/36	2.6; 9	2.4; 8/9	1.1; 5/6	1.0; 6	–	–	–	–	–	6.7
Simple Lógica/elDiario.es	6–14 Jul	1,300	?	28.4; 102/110	32.2; 131/139	13.4; 32/38	13.7; 33/39	–	–	–	–	–	–	–	–	–	3.8
Target Point/El Debate	6–14 Jul	?	?	28.2; 107/109	36.0; 149/151	12.7; 32/34	11.8; 28/30	–	–	–	–	–	–	–	–	–	7.8
GAD3/ABC	29 Jun–14 Jul	6,501	71	28.5; 115	37.2; 152	11.7; 29	11.4; 25	2.3; 8	2.0; 8	1.2; 5	1.3; 6	0.5; 1	0.4; 0	0.5; 1	0.1; 0	0.1; 0	8.7
EM-Analytics/Electomanía	13 Jul	?	?	29.2; 106	34.2; 142	13.3; 36	13.0; 34	? 7	? 8	? 5	? 6	? 1	? 0	? 2	? 1	? 2	5.0
DYM/Henneo	12–13 Jul	1,021	?	27.1; 102/106	35.5; 145/150	12.3; 31/35	13.1; 31/35	–	–	–	–	–	–	–	–	–	8.4
NC Report/La Razón	12–13 Jul	1,000	64.0	27.8; 103/105	36.6; 151/153	11.9; 29/31	11.5; 28/30	2.5; 10	2.1; 8/9	1.5; 6	1.5; 6/7	0.6; 1/2	–	–	–	–	8.8
Data10/Okdiario	11–13 Jul	1,500	?	26.3; 106	35.5; 147	13.5; 33	12.7; 31	–	–	–	–	–	–	–	–	–	9.2
Hamalgama Métrica/Vozpópuli	10–13 Jul	1,000	?	27.5; 104	36.3; 147	13.8; 36	12.1; 29	2.2; 9	2.0; 8	1.4; 5	1.5; 6	0.7; 1	0.3; 1	0.7; 2	0.2; 1	0.1; 1	8.8
Sondaxe/La Voz de Galicia	9–13 Jul	1,000	70.8	27.7; 105	33.2; 135	12.8; 37	14.3; 38	? 9	? 9	? 5	? 6	? 1	? 2	? 2	? 0	? 1	5.5
40dB/Prisa	9–13 Jul	2,000	?	29.1; 105/114	32.6; 130/139	14.4; 38/44	12.6; 30/36	? 8	? 8	? 5	? 6	? 1	? 1	? 2	? 0	? 1	3.5
Sigma Dos/El Mundo	7–13 Jul	4,816	71.2	28.0; 104/107	34.6; 145/148	12.6; 34/36	13.0; 34/36	2.5; 9	2.4; 8/9	1.2; 5/6	1.0; 6	–	–	–	–	–	6.6
Simple Lógica/elDiario.es	5–13 Jul	1,300	?	28.2; 101/109	32.0; 130/138	14.1; 35/41	14.0; 34/40	–	–	–	–	–	–	–	–	–	3.8
Target Point/El Debate	5–13 Jul	1,132	?	27.6; 104/106	35.9; 148/150	13.4; 35/37	12.1; 28/30	–	–	–	–	–	–	–	–	–	8.3
GAD3/ABC	29 Jun–13 Jul	6,003	70	28.5; 112	36.8; 152	12.3; 31	11.3; 25	2.3; 9	2.0; 8	1.2; 5	1.3; 6	0.5; 1	0.4; 0	0.5; 1	0.1; 0	0.1; 0	8.3
EM-Analytics/Electomanía	12 Jul	1,012	?	29.0; 106	34.4; 142	13.7; 36	12.8; 34	2.0; 7	1.7; 8	1.4; 6	1.5; 5	0.7; 1	0.3; 0	1.0; 2	0.3; 1	0.2; 2	5.4
NC Report/La Razón	11–12 Jul	1,000	64.2	27.7; 105/108	36.3; 149/151	12.0; 30/32	11.9; 29/31	2.6; 10	2.1; 8/9	1.5; 5/6	1.5; 5/6	0.6; 1/2	–	–	–	–	8.6
EM-Analytics/Electomanía	11–12 Jul	?	?	29.1; 106	34.3; 142	13.6; 36	13.0; 34	? 7	? 8	? 6	? 5	? 1	? 0	? 2	? 1	? 2	5.2
CIS (SocioMétrica) (Note: Alternative projection based on raw CIS data.)	10–12 Jul	8,798	?	29.0; 107/112	32.1; 135/143	14.1; 38/40	13.8; 36/38	1.8 ?	1.3 ?	1.2 ?	1.2 ?	0.6 ?	0.2 ?	0.8 ?	0.1 ?	0.1 ?	3.1
CIS	10–12 Jul	8,798	?	32.2	30.8	11.8	14.9	2.1	1.4	1.1	1.1	0.6	0.2	0.9	0.2	0.1	1.4
Celeste-Tel/Onda Cero	10–12 Jul	1,100	63.2	28.4; 103	36.5; 151	11.4; 30	11.5; 29	2.3; 9	2.1; 8	1.4; 6	1.5; 7	0.9; 2	0.4; 1	0.8; 2	0.2; 1	0.1; 1	8.1
SocioMétrica/El Español	9–12 Jul	800	?	28.6; 106	33.8; 141	13.9; 38	12.7; 32	2.2; 9	1.9; 8	1.3; 5	1.4; 5	0.6; 1	0.4; 1	0.8; 2	0.3; 1	0.4; 1	5.2
40dB/Prisa	8–12 Jul	2,000	?	29.5; 106/119	31.8; 123/139	14.8; 39/45	12.6; 30/36	? 8	? 8	? 5	? 6	? 1	? 1	? 1	? 0	? 1	2.3
Sondaxe/La Voz de Galicia	6–12 Jul	1,000	69.7	28.0; 106	33.4; 137	12.8; 36	13.5; 36	? 11	? 9	? 4	? 7	? 0	? 1	? 2	? 0	? 1	5.4
Sigma Dos/El Mundo	6–12 Jul	4,608	71.0	28.1; 104/107	34.5; 144/147	12.8; 34/36	12.8; 34/36	2.4; 9	2.4; 8/9	1.1; 5/6	1.0; 6	–	–	–	–	–	6.4
Simple Lógica/elDiario.es	4–12 Jul	1,300	?	28.1; 100/108	32.2; 132/140	14.2; 35/41	14.4; 35/41	–	–	–	–	–	–	–	–	–	4.1
Target Point/El Debate	4–12 Jul	1,601	?	27.6; 104/106	35.8; 147/149	13.0; 34/36	12.5; 29/31	–	–	–	–	–	–	–	–	–	8.2
GAD3/ABC	29 Jun–12 Jul	5,502	69	28.2; 110	36.7; 152	12.4; 31	11.6; 27	2.3; 9	2.0; 8	1.2; 5	1.3; 6	0.5; 1	0.4; 0	0.5; 1	0.1; 0	0.1; 0	8.5
Data10/Okdiario	11 Jul	1,500	?	26.2; 106	35.3; 145	13.7; 34	12.4; 30	–	–	–	–	–	–	–	–	–	9.1
NC Report/La Razón	10–11 Jul	1,000	64.4	27.8; 104/107	36.0; 147/149	12.4; 31/34	12.2; 30/31	2.7; 10/11	2.1; 8/9	1.4; 6	1.3; 5/6	0.7; 1/2	–	–	–	–	8.2
EM-Analytics/Electomanía	10–11 Jul	2,788	?	29.1; 107	34.0; 141	13.4; 36	13.2; 34	2.0; 7	1.8; 8	1.2; 6	1.4; 5	0.7; 1	0.3; 0	1.1; 2	0.3; 1	0.2; 2	4.9
Sondaxe/La Voz de Galicia	7–11 Jul	1,000	?	28.1; 106	33.7; 137	12.6; 36	13.7; 36	? 11	? 8	? 5	? 6	? 1	? 1	? 2	? 0	? 1	5.6
40dB/Prisa	7–11 Jul	2,000	?	29.5; 107/119	31.2; 122/135	14.7; 38/44	13.3; 35/38	? 8	? 8	? 5	? 6	? 1	? 1	? 1	? 0	? 1	1.7
Sigma Dos/El Mundo	5–11 Jul	4,455	71.5	28.6; 105/109	34.4; 142/146	13.0; 35/37	12.7; 33/35	2.1; 8/9	2.0; 8	1.1; 5/6	1.0; 6	–	–	–	–	–	5.8
Target Point/El Debate	4–11 Jul	1,263	?	28.1; 107/109	35.5; 146/148	12.8; 32/34	12.2; 27/29	–	–	–	–	–	–	–	–	–	7.4
Simple Lógica/elDiario.es	3–11 Jul	1,300	?	28.8; 107/117	31.1; 122/132	14.5; 36/42	15.0; 37/43	–	–	–	–	–	–	–	–	–	2.3
GAD3/ABC	29 Jun–11 Jul	5,001	69	27.9; 109	36.7; 153	12.0; 29	12.0; 28	2.3; 9	2.0; 8	1.3; 5	1.3; 6	0.5; 1	0.4; 0	0.6; 2	0.1; 0	0.1; 0	8.8
EM-Analytics/Electomanía	9–10 Jul	1,004	?	29.6; 109	33.0; 136	13.6; 37	13.4; 34	? 8	? 8	? 6	? 5	? 1	? 1	? 2	? 1	? 2	3.4
DYM/Henneo	7–10 Jul	1,021	?	27.7; 105/108	33.7; 138/142	13.4; 36/39	13.4; 32/35	–	–	–	–	–	–	–	–	–	6.0
Sondaxe/La Voz de Galicia	6–10 Jul	1,000	?	28.1; 106	33.1; 136	13.8; 38	13.5; 37	? 10	? 8	? 4	? 7	? 1	? 0	? 2	? 0	? 1	5.0
40dB/Prisa	6–10 Jul	2,000	?	29.7; 107/121	30.8; 120/132	15.2; 41/47	13.0; 33/36	? 9	? 8	? 5	? 6	? 1	? 1	? 1	? 0	? 1	1.1
Sigma Dos/El Mundo	4–10 Jul	4,482	72.3	28.6; 105/109	34.6; 143/147	12.7; 34/36	12.3; 30/32	2.2; 8/9	2.0; 8	1.1; 5/6	1.1; 6	–	–	–	–	–	6.0
Simple Lógica/elDiario.es	3–10 Jul	997	?	28.8; 107/117	30.9; 122/132	14.5; 35/42	14.9; 37/43	–	–	–	–	–	–	–	–	–	2.1
GAD3/ABC	29 Jun–10 Jul	4,003	69	28.6; 113	36.3; 151	12.3; 30	12.0; 27	2.2; 8	1.9; 8	1.2; 5	1.3; 6	0.5; 1	0.4; 0	0.5; 1	0.1; 0	0.1; 0	7.7
EM-Analytics/Electomanía	8–9 Jul	877	?	29.6; 110	32.8; 137	13.5; 37	13.3; 34	2.0; 7	1.7; 7	1.4; 6	1.4; 5	0.6; 1	0.4; 1	1.0; 2	0.3; 1	0.4; 2	3.2
Sondaxe/La Voz de Galicia	5–9 Jul	1,000	?	27.7; 105	33.7; 138	14.5; 37	13.6; 36	? 11	? 8	? 4	? 7	? 1	? 0	? 2	? 0	? 1	6.0
40dB/Prisa	4–9 Jul	2,500	?	29.3; 106/119	31.0; 121/133	15.0; 39/46	13.5; 36/39	? 8	? 8	? 5	? 6	? 1	? 1	? 1	? 0	? 1	1.7
SocioMétrica/El Español	2–9 Jul	800	?	28.6; 108	33.4; 138	13.6; 38	13.0; 33	2.4; 9	2.0; 8	1.4; 6	1.3; 5	0.6; 1	0.3; 1	0.7; 1	0.3; 1	0.4; 1	4.8
EM-Analytics/Electomanía	7–8 Jul	?	?	29.5; 111	32.5; 135	14.0; 37	13.4; 34	? 7	? 8	? 6	? 5	? 1	? 1	? 2	? 1	? 2	3.0
Sondaxe/La Voz de Galicia	4–8 Jul	1,000	?	27.8; 106	31.1; 129	15.1; 44	13.6; 37	? 10	? 9	? 5	? 6	? 1	? 1	? 2	? 0	? 1	3.3
40dB/Prisa	4–8 Jul	2,000	?	29.2; 105/118	31.4; 122/138	14.7; 38/44	13.5; 35/39	? 8	? 8	? 5	? 6	? 1	? 1	? 1	? 0	? 1	2.2
Sigma Dos/El Mundo	3–8 Jul	4,506	71.8	28.3; 105/108	34.9; 144/147	12.8; 34/37	12.5; 30/33	2.1; 8/9	2.0; 8/9	1.1; 6	1.0; 5/6	–	–	–	–	–	6.6
GAD3/ABC	29 Jun–8 Jul	4,001	70	28.8; 114	36.3; 151	12.3; 30	11.8; 26	2.3; 9	1.8; 7	1.2; 5	1.3; 6	0.5; 1	0.4; 0	0.5; 1	0.1; 0	0.1; 0	7.5
Data10/Okdiario	5–7 Jul	1,500	?	25.5; 104	34.4; 142	14.2; 36	13.0; 31	2.5; 10	2.3; 9	1.6; 6	1.4; 6	0.6; 1	0.4; 1	0.9; 2	0.3; 1	0.1; 1	8.9
Target Point/El Debate	4–7 Jul	1,020	?	28.2; 107/109	34.9; 144/146	13.3; 33/35	12.2; 27/29	–	–	–	–	–	–	–	–	–	6.7
40dB/Prisa	4–7 Jul	1,500	?	29.3; 104/118	31.5; 121/138	14.9; 39/47	13.1; 33/37	? 8	? 8	? 5	? 6	? 1	? 1	? 1	? 0	? 1	2.2
NC Report/La Razón	3–7 Jul	1,000	65.1	27.4; 103/105	35.7; 147/149	12.6; 32/34	12.4; 29/31	2.8; 10/11	2.1; 8/9	1.4; 6	1.3; 5/6	0.7; 1/2	–	–	–	–	8.3
Sondaxe/La Voz de Galicia	3–7 Jul	1,000	?	26.9; 104	30.4; 128	15.6; 47	14.5; 38	? 9	? 9	? 5	? 6	? 0	? 1	? 2	? 0	? 1	3.5
InvyMark/laSexta	3–7 Jul	?	?	26.1	32.4	14.3	13.7	–	–	–	–	–	–	–	–	–	6.3
Sigma Dos/El Mundo	1–7 Jul	4,533	71.7	28.2; 104/106	35.0; 145/147	12.8; 35/37	12.5; 30/32	2.2; 8/9	2.0; 8/9	1.1; 6	1.0; 6	–	–	–	–	–	6.8
GAD3/ABC	29 Jun–7 Jul	3,502	70	28.9; 115	36.3; 150	12.1; 29	11.9; 26	2.2; 9	1.9; 8	1.2; 5	1.3; 6	0.5; 1	0.4; 0	0.5; 1	0.1; 0	0.1; 0	7.4
KeyData/Público	6 Jul	?	69.3	27.0; 103	33.7; 140	13.9; 39	13.1; 33	2.6; 10	2.1; 8	1.4; 5	1.4; 6	0.7; 1	? 1	? 2	? 1	? 1	6.7
IMOP/El Confidencial	4–6 Jul	1,559	70	27.7; 104/106	32.9; 136/139	14.2; 40/44	13.0; 32/35	2.3; 8/10	2.2; 8/10	1.5; 6	1.3; 5/6	0.9; 1/2	0.3; 0/1	1.0; 2/3	0.3; 1	0.1; 0/1	5.2
Ipsos/La Vanguardia	3–6 Jul	2,001	70	28.2; 102/113	35.3; 138/147	12.6; 32/39	12.9; 31/39	1.6; 7	1.8; 8/9	1.2; 5/6	1.3; 5	0.5; 1	0.3; 0/1	0.6; 1/2	? 0	0.3; 1/2	7.1
Sigma Dos/El Mundo	30 Jun–6 Jul	4,518	71.9	28.4; 104/108	34.7; 142/145	12.7; 34/35	12.6; 30/32	2.1; 8/9	2.0; 8/9	1.2; 6	1.1; 6	–	–	–	–	–	6.3
YouGov	29 Jun–6 Jul	10,480	?	28.0; 101/119	31.0; 122/142	14.0; 39/52	14.0; 30/40	2.0; 6/8	2.0; 7/9	1.0; 3/5	1.0; 5/7	–	–	1.0; 1/3	–	–	3.0
GAD3/ABC	29 Jun–6 Jul	3,001	69	28.6; 110	36.4; 152	12.2; 31	12.2; 27	2.1; 9	1.8; 7	1.2; 5	1.3; 6	0.5; 1	0.4; 0	0.5; 1	0.1; 0	0.1; 1	7.8
Top Position	28 Jun–6 Jul	3,200	?	28.1; 104	34.2; 145	13.3; 34	12.8; 32	–	–	–	–	–	–	–	–	–	6.1
40dB/Prisa	4–5 Jul	1,000	?	29.5; 107/118	31.3; 119/134	14.8; 38/45	13.4; 35/39	? 8	? 8	? 5	? 6	? 1	? 1	? 1	? 0	? 1	1.8
CIS	30 Jun–5 Jul	4,166	?	31.0	29.6	11.7	15.5	1.7	1.1	1.1	1.2	0.6	0.1	0.8	0.2	0.1	1.4
EM-Analytics/Electomanía	29 Jun–5 Jul	2,003	?	29.5; 112	32.0; 134	13.7; 37	13.5; 36	2.0; 7	1.8; 8	1.4; 6	1.4; 5	0.7; 1	0.4; 1	1.0; 2	0.3; 1	0.2; 0	2.5
GAD3/ABC	29 Jun–5 Jul	2,502	70	28.5; 109	36.4; 152	12.2; 31	12.3; 28	2.1; 9	1.8; 7	1.2; 5	1.3; 6	0.5; 1	0.4; 0	0.5; 1	0.1; 0	0.1; 1	7.9
GAD3/ABC	29 Jun–4 Jul	2,001	69	28.1; 107	36.9; 155	11.8; 29	12.6; 30	2.1; 9	1.8; 7	1.2; 5	1.2; 5	0.5; 1	0.4; 0	0.5; 1	0.1; 0	0.1; 1	8.8
Opinòmetre/Ara	27 Jun–4 Jul	1,521	?	29.0; 110/130	32.6; 125/140	12.7; 22/30	15.5; 30/40	2.2; 9/11	1.8; 7/9	–	–	0.9; 1/2	–	–	–	–	3.6
Sigma Dos/El Mundo	24 Jun–4 Jul	4,501	71.8	28.8; 106/110	34.3; 141/144	13.0; 34/35	12.6; 29/31	2.1; 8/9	2.0; 8/9	1.2; 5/6	1.1; 5/6	–	–	–	–	–	5.5
DYM/Henneo	30 Jun–3 Jul	1,018	?	27.8; 105/107	32.8; 135/138	13.6; 38/40	13.2; 31/33	–	–	–	–	–	–	–	–	–	5.0
GAD3/ABC	29 Jun–3 Jul	1,503	69	28.2; 106	36.8; 154	11.5; 27	12.8; 32	2.1; 9	1.8; 7	1.2; 5	1.3; 6	0.5; 1	0.5; 1	0.6; 1	0.1; 0	0.1; 1	8.6
Sigma Dos/Antena 3	23 Jun–3 Jul	2,880	?	28.5; 104/106	34.7; 142/145	13.2; 33/35	12.8; 33/35	2.4; 8/9	2.2; 8/9	? 6	? 6	–	–	–	–	–	6.2
SocioMétrica/El Español	25 Jun–2 Jul	800	?	27.0; 102	32.6; 140	14.4; 41	12.9; 32	2.5; 10	2.1; 8	1.6; 6	1.5; 5	0.6; 1	0.4; 1	0.6; 1	0.3; 1	0.6; 2	5.6
Cluster17/El Grand Continent	30 Jun–1 Jul	1,447	?	27.2; 98	32.4; 134	14.4; 41	14.5; 38	2.4; 9	2.7; 10	1.3; 6	1.7; 7	0.7; 1	0.5; 2	0.8; 2	0.3; 1	0.5; 1	5.2
GAD3/ABC	29–30 Jun	1,004	70	28.4; 107/111	36.6; 150/154	11.5; 25/29	12.6; 30/34	2.2; 9	1.8; 7	1.3; 5	1.3; 6	0.5; 1	0.5; 1	0.6; 1	0.1; 0	0.1; 1	8.2
NC Report/La Razón	26–30 Jun	1,000	65.2	26.3; 99/101	34.4; 143/145	13.7; 37/39	13.3; 31/33	3.0; 11	2.1; 8	1.5; 6	1.3; 5/6	0.7; 2	–	–	–	–	8.1
Sigma Dos/El Mundo	26–30 Jun	2,109	?	28.2; 102/105	34.4; 140/143	13.5; 34/36	12.8; 31/33	2.7; 10/11	2.4; 10/11	1.5; 6	1.2; 6	? 1/2	? 1	? 0	? 1/2	? 0/2	6.2
Data10/Okdiario	28–29 Jun	1,500	?	24.5; 101	34.2; 140	14.6; 38	13.4; 32	2.6; 10	2.4; 10	1.6; 6	1.4; 6	0.7; 1	0.4; 2	1.0; 2	0.2; 1	0.1; 1	9.7
IMOP/El Confidencial	27–29 Jun	1,043	73	26.2; 97/100	32.6; 132/135	15.3; 44/47	13.3; 35/37	2.6; 9/11	2.1; 8	1.4; 6	1.3; 5/6	0.8; 1	0.3; 1	1.1; 2/3	1.4; 1/2	1.0; 1/2	6.4
GAD3/NIUS	27–28 Jun	1,005	70	28.5; 106/110	36.6; 149/153	11.6; 26/30	12.7; 30/34	2.2; 9	1.6; 7	1.2; 5	1.3; 6	0.5; 1	0.4; 1	0.6; 1	0.1; 0	0.1; 1	8.1
EM-Analytics/Electomanía	22–28 Jun	1,812	?	29.0; 109	32.1; 134	13.9; 39	13.6; 36	2.0; 7	1.7; 8	1.4; 6	1.4; 5	0.7; 1	0.4; 1	1.0; 2	0.3; 1	0.2; 1	3.1
CIS (SocioMétrica)	8–27 Jun	29,201	71.2	26.3; 99	33.8; 142	14.9; 42	14.3; 38	1.5; 6	1.7; 8	1.1; 6	1.1; 5	0.8; 2	0.3; 0	0.7; 2	0.0; 0	0.2; 0	7.5
CIS	8–27 Jun	29,201	?	31.2; 115/135	31.4; 122/140	10.6; 21/29	16.4; 43/50	1.6; 5/7	1.1; 3/6	1.0; 3/5	1.2; 4/7	0.6; 0/1	0.3; 0/1	1.0; 2/3	–	0.1; 0/1	0.2
40dB/Prisa	23–26 Jun	2,000	?	28.7; 104/119	30.9; 118/132	15.1; 40/47	12.8; 33/35	? 9	? 10	? 6	? 5	? 1	? 1	? 2	? 1	? 1	2.2
DYM/Henneo	16–26 Jun	1,522	?	28.4; 106/109	33.2; 137/140	13.2; 36/38	12.5; 29/31	–	–	–	–	–	–	–	–	–	4.8
SocioMétrica/El Español	18–25 Jun	800	?	25.5; 94	32.1; 138	14.7; 44	13.5; 35	2.5; 10	2.3; 9	1.5; 6	1.8; 7	0.7; 1	0.4; 1	0.7; 2	0.3; 1	0.7; 2	6.6
NC Report/La Razón	19–24 Jun	1,000	65.3	25.9; 97/99	34.3; 144/146	13.9; 38/40	13.1; 31/33	3.1; 11/12	2.0; 8	1.6; 6	1.3; 5/6	0.8; 2	–	–	–	–	8.4
Data10/Okdiario	22–23 Jun	1,500	?	24.0; 100	34.4; 141	14.9; 39	13.1; 29	2.6; 10	2.4; 11	1.5; 6	1.4; 7	0.7; 1	0.4; 2	1.1; 2	0.3; 1	0.1; 1	10.4
InvyMark/laSexta	19–23 Jun	1,200	?	24.7	31.8	15.0	14.4	–	–	–	–	–	–	–	–	–	7.1
Sigma Dos/El Mundo	16–23 Jun	2,188	?	28.4; 102	34.0; 140	13.4; 35	13.7; 35	2.7; 11	2.3; 10	1.5; 6	1.2; 6	–	–	–	–	–	5.6
KeyData/Público	22 Jun	?	69.5	26.6; 102	33.6; 140	14.4; 41	13.0; 32	2.5; 10	2.1; 8	1.4; 6	1.3; 5	0.9; 1	? 1	? 2	? 1	? 1	7.0
Celeste-Tel/Onda Cero	19–21 Jun	1,100	65.1	26.7; 99	34.2; 140	14.0; 40	12.8; 32	3.0; 12	2.3; 9	1.5; 6	1.3; 5	0.9; 2	0.3; 1	0.9; 2	0.3; 1	0.1; 1	7.5
EM-Analytics/Electomanía	16–21 Jun	2,807	?	28.0; 105	32.2; 137	14.4; 39	13.5; 37	2.2; 7	1.8; 8	1.5; 6	1.4; 5	0.6; 1	0.4; 1	1.0; 2	0.3; 1	0.2; 1	4.2
DYM/Henneo	16–19 Jun	1,015	?	27.6; 103/106	33.8; 138/141	13.3; 36/39	11.9; 28/30	–	–	–	–	–	–	–	–	–	6.2
NC Report/La Razón	12–17 Jun	1,000	64.9	25.5; 96/98	34.7; 145/147	14.1; 38/40	12.9; 30/32	3.0; 11/12	2.0; 8	1.5; 5/6	1.3; 5/6	0.8; 2	–	–	–	–	9.2
SocioMétrica/El Español	10–17 Jun	800	?	25.4; 94	32.6; 135	14.8; 46	12.9; 34	2.4; 9	2.5; 10	1.5; 6	1.6; 7	0.8; 1	0.5; 2	0.8; 2	0.3; 1	0.8; 3	7.2
InvyMark/laSexta	12–16 Jun	1,200	?	24.1	32.1	14.8	14.1	–	–	–	–	–	–	–	–	–	8.0
Sigma Dos/El Mundo	8–16 Jun	2,977	?	28.7; 105	34.1; 141	13.2; 36	12.8; 30	2.9; 12	2.4; 8	1.6; 6	1.2; 5	–	–	–	–	–	5.4
Data10/Okdiario	14–15 Jun	1,500	?	23.2; 98	34.3; 140	15.4; 42	13.3; 29	2.6; 10	2.5; 11	1.5; 6	1.5; 7	0.7; 1	0.5; 2	1.0; 2	0.3; 1	0.1; 1	11.1
IMOP/El Confidencial	12–15 Jun	1,008	?	24.5; 94/96	33.3; 136/138	14.9; 44/45	15.0; 37/39	2.3; 8/9	2.2; 8	1.4; 6	1.2; 5/6	0.7; 5/6	0.3; 1	0.9; 2	0.3; 1/2	0.2; 2	8.8
Hamalgama Métrica/Vozpópuli	12–15 Jun	1,000	?	25.9; 98	32.4; 132	15.8; 50	13.1; 31	2.9; 11	2.2; 9	1.5; 6	1.4; 6	0.8; 2	0.3; 1	0.8; 2	0.2; 1	0.1; 1	6.5
EM-Analytics/Electomanía	10–15 Jun	3,715	?	26.9; 102	32.5; 137	14.8; 40	14.0; 38	2.2; 8	1.8; 8	1.5; 6	1.3; 5	0.7; 1	0.4; 1	1.0; 2	0.3; 1	0.2; 1	5.6
40dB/Prisa	12–14 Jun	2,000	?	27.4; 99/109	33.1; 128/142	13.8; 37/41	13.1; 34/36	? 10	? 8	? 6	? 5	? 1	? 1	? 2	? 1	? 1	5.7
Sondaxe/La Voz de Galicia	5–13 Jun	1,013	?	26.6	32.6	13.9	13.4	2.5	2.2	2.0	1.7	–	–	0.9	–	–	6.0
Sigma Dos/Antena 3	5–13 Jun	1,515	?	? 102/104	? 144/146	? 31/33	? 30/33	? 12/13	? 8/9	? 6	? 5	–	–	–	–	–	?
SocioMétrica/El Español	8–10 Jun	1,010	?	25.4; 94	32.1; 134	15.0; 47	12.7; 33	2.4; 10	2.5; 11	1.6; 6	1.7; 7	0.7; 1	0.4; 1	0.9; 2	0.3; 1	1.1; 3	6.7
EM-Analytics/Electomanía	3–10 Jun	3,557	?	25.9; 96	31.4; 129	16.0; 48	14.8; 44	2.0; 8	1.8; 8	1.5; 6	1.4; 5	0.7; 1	0.4; 1	1.0; 2	0.3; 1	0.2; 1	5.5
Data10/Okdiario	7–8 Jun	1,500	?	22.8; 96	34.1; 139	15.6; 44	13.6; 30	2.6; 10	2.6; 11	1.5; 6	1.6; 7	0.8; 1	0.6; 2	0.9; 2	0.2; 1	0.1; 1	11.3
GAD3/ABC	5–8 Jun	2,007	70	27.7; 101/104	36.6; 150/153	12.4; 33/35	11.2; 27/29	2.3; 9	1.9; 8	1.3; 6	1.4; 5	0.8; 2	0.5; 1	0.7; 2	0.1; 0	0.1; 1	8.9
Sigma Dos/El Mundo	5–8 Jun	1,711	?	27.6; 103	34.6; 145	11.9; 31	12.6; 33	3.0; 12	2.3; 8	1.5; 6	1.1; 5	–	–	–	–	–	7.0
Simple Lógica/elDiario.es	1–8 Jun	1,027	73.4	27.9	34.1	14.1	12.8	–	–	–	–	–	–	–	–	–	6.2
CIS (SocioMétrica)	31 May–7 Jun	7,407	?	26.9; 100	33.5; 138	15.9; 49	11.5; 30	–	–	–	–	–	–	–	–	–	6.6
CIS	31 May–7 Jun	7,407	?	31.2	30.7	10.6	14.3	1.8	1.6	1.1	1.1	0.5	0.3	0.7	0.1	0.1	0.5

===== 2023 (Mar–Jun) =====
Polling firm/Commissioner	Fieldwork date	Sample size	Turnout	PSOE	PP	Vox	Podemos	Sumar	CS	ERC–Sobiranistes	Junts	PNV	EH Bildu	CUP	CC–NCa	BNG	UPN	PRC	EV	Lead
NC Report/La Razón	30 May–3 Jun	1,000	65.5	23.3; 94/96	34.6; 145/147	14.3; 39/41	4.2; 2/3	10.5; 24/26	–	3.1; 12/13	2.0; 8/9	1.5; 5/6	1.3; 5/6	–	–	–	–	–	–	11.3
SocioMétrica/El Español	30 May–3 Jun	1,140	?	23.9; 90	31.8; 135	16.1; 52	4.9; 4	9.8; 26	–	2.5; 11	2.2; 11	1.5; 6	1.5; 6	0.6; 1	0.4; 1	0.7; 2	0.2; 1	0.2; 1	1.0; 3	7.9
Data10/Okdiario	1–2 Jun	1,500	?	22.1; 89	34.3; 140	15.9; 48	(Note: Within Sumar.)	13.9; 31	–	2.6; 11	2.6; 11	1.5; 6	1.7; 7	0.7; 1	0.6; 2	0.8; 2	0.2; 1	0.2; 0	0.1; 1	12.2
Target Point/El Debate	31 May–2 Jun	1,027	62.4	27.6; 109/111	34.4; 146/149	13.6; 32/34		12.8; 27/29	–	–	–	–	–	–	–	–	–	–	–	6.8
EM-Analytics/Electomanía	29 May–2 Jun	1,854	?	25.3; 94	31.7; 130	16.2; 50		15.7; 44	–	1.9; 7	1.9; 8	1.6; 6	1.4; 5	0.8; 1	0.6; 1	1.0; 2	0.3; 1	0.1; 0	0.2; 1	6.4
EM-Analytics/Electomanía	29 May–2 Jun	1,854	?	26.7; 101	32.9; 141	15.9; 50	3.1; 2	9.2; 17	–	2.0; 8	1.8; 8	1.6; 6	1.4; 8	0.9; 3	0.6; 1	1.1; 3	0.2; 1	0.1; 0	0.2; 1	6.2
InvyMark/laSexta	29 May–2 Jun	1,200	?	24.3	32.6	14.4	5.2	10.5	–	–	–	–	–	–	–	–	–	–	–	8.3
40dB/Prisa	31 May–1 Jun	800	?	27.2; 97/109	32.3; 126/139	13.6; 38/40		15.6; 39/46	–	? 9	? 8	? 6	? 4	? 1	? 1	? 2	? 1	? 0	? 1	5.1
40dB/Prisa	31 May–1 Jun	800	?	27.3; 104/117	31.6; 125/138	15.0; 40/52	4.4; 3	10.0; 22/24	–	? 10	? 10	? 6	? 5	? 1	? 1	? 2	? 1	? 0	? 1	4.3
GESOP/Prensa Ibérica	30 May–1 Jun	1,003	?	27.6; 104/110	30.7; 126/132	14.6; 42/45	1.9; 2/3	13.0; 33/36	–	1.9; 8/9	1.9; 8/9	–	–	–	–	–	–	–	–	3.1
Sigma Dos/El Mundo	29 May–1 Jun	2,401	?	25.7; 99	34.2; 144	12.1; 33		14.2; 34	–	3.1; 13	2.4; 8	1.4; 6	1.1; 5	–	–	–	–	–	–	8.5
IMOP/El Confidencial	29–30 May	914	?	24.6; 93	34.4; 144	16.3; 52		10.2; 25	0.2; 0	2.5; 11	1.8; 8	1.5; 6	1.3; 6	–	0.3; 1	1.0; 2	–	–	–	9.8
Data10/Okdiario	29 May	1,500	?	21.3; 84	33.7; 141	15.4; 44		15.0; 40	1.4; 0	2.5; 11	2.6; 11	1.5; 6	1.6; 6	0.6; 1	0.6; 2	0.8; 2	0.2; 1	0.2; 0	0.1; 1	12.4
2023 local elections	28 May	—N/a	63.9	28.1	31.5	7.2	2.0	5.5	1.4	2.3	2.5	1.4	1.6	0.6	0.7	1.1	0.4	0.3	0.1	3.4
EM-Analytics/Electomanía	13–19 May	2,001	?	25.2; 96	31.0; 133	14.9; 46		14.4; 39	2.5; 1	2.4; 9	1.9; 8	1.8; 7	1.4; 5	0.8; 1	0.5; 1	0.7; 1	0.2; 1	0.3; 1	0.2; 1	5.8
EM-Analytics/Electomanía	13–19 May	2,001	?	26.8; 112	30.3; 129	15.0; 50	4.6; 3	8.2; 11	2.6; 1	2.6; 11	2.0; 8	1.9; 8	1.4; 7	0.9; 3	0.5; 2	0.7; 2	0.2; 1	0.3; 1	0.2; 1	3.5
EM-Analytics/Electomanía	6–12 May	2,155	?	24.5; 90	31.6; 134	14.6; 44		14.7; 41	2.5; 1	2.4; 10	2.0; 8	1.6; 7	1.4; 5	0.8; 1	0.6; 2	0.7; 1	0.4; 2	0.2; 1	0.4; 3	7.1
EM-Analytics/Electomanía	6–12 May	2,155	?	26.4; 108	30.6; 133	15.0; 50	4.6; 3	8.3; 11	2.4; 1	2.6; 11	2.0; 8	1.8; 8	1.4; 7	0.9; 3	0.6; 1	0.7; 2	0.2; 1	0.3; 1	0.3; 2	4.2
Simple Lógica/elDiario.es	3–11 May	1,013	70.2	26.2	27.9	15.8	7.3	10.7	1.2	–	–	–	–	–	–	–	–	–	–	1.7
GAD3/NIUS	8–9 May	1,011	68	26.9; 105/109	32.9; 145/149	13.2; 38/40	6.2; 11/13	7.4; 9/11	1.4; 0	2.4; 11	1.5; 7	1.3; 6	1.3; 6	0.7; 2	0.4; 1	0.6; 1	0.2; 0	0.1; 0	0.1; 1	6.0
CIS (SocioMétrica)	3–8 May	4,030	64.6	24.5	28.7	16.0	5.4	12.0	1.0	2.4	1.3	1.1	1.2	0.8	0.4	0.6	0.1	0.1	0.0	4.2
CIS	3–8 May	4,030	?	29.1	27.2	10.6	6.1	12.3	2.3	2.4	1.2	0.9	0.9	0.7	0.5	0.8	0.1	0.1	0.1	1.9
NC Report/La Razón	6 May	1,000	66.0	22.3; 91/93	33.2; 141/143	13.5; 40/42	4.9; 2/4	11.6; 27/29	–	3.1; 12/13	–	–	–	–	–	–	–	–	–	10.9
SocioMétrica/El Español	2–5 May	900	?	24.1; 92	28.9; 127	16.0; 52	6.7; 8	9.9; 30	2.4; 1	2.4; 12	1.9; 9	1.4; 6	1.1; 5	0.7; 1	0.4; 1	0.5; 1	0.3; 2	0.2; 1	0.6; 2	4.8
EM-Analytics/Electomanía	29 Apr–5 May	2,022	?	24.5; 82	32.0; 139	14.6; 43		14.7; 48	2.5; 1	2.4; 10	1.9; 8	1.5; 6	1.3; 5	0.8; 1	0.5; 0	0.7; 1	0.3; 2	0.2; 1	0.2; 3	7.5
EM-Analytics/Electomanía	29 Apr–5 May	2,022	?	26.5; 109	30.8; 134	14.7; 47	4.6; 3	8.7; 12	2.5; 1	2.6; 12	2.0; 9	1.6; 7	1.4; 6	0.8; 2	0.5; 1	0.7; 2	0.3; 2	0.2; 1	0.3; 2	4.3
InvyMark/laSexta	24–28 Apr	?	?	24.1	29.7	14.0	5.6	10.2	0.9	–	–	–	–	–	–	–	–	–	–	5.6
EM-Analytics/Electomanía	22–28 Apr	?	?	24.6; 83	31.7; 138	14.5; 44		14.6; 46	2.5; 1	2.4; 10	1.9; 8	1.6; 7	1.3; 5	0.8; 1	0.6; 1	0.7; 1	0.3; 2	0.2; 1	0.2; 2	7.1
EM-Analytics/Electomanía	22–28 Apr	?	?	26.3; 108	30.5; 133	14.6; 46	4.7; 3	9.1; 15	2.5; 1	2.6; 12	2.0; 9	1.6; 8	1.4; 5	0.8; 2	0.5; 1	0.7; 2	0.3; 2	0.2; 1	0.3; 2	4.2
Data10/Okdiario	25–27 Apr	1,500	?	21.2; 83	32.8; 140	15.7; 46		15.8; 42	2.1; 0	3.0; 13	2.0; 9	1.6; 6	1.5; 6	–	–	–	–	–	–	11.6
Data10/Okdiario	25–27 Apr	1,500	?	22.6; 92	32.0; 138	15.2; 45	6.7; 10	8.8; 23	2.1; 0	3.0; 13	2.0; 9	1.6; 6	1.5; 6	–	–	–	–	–	–	9.4
Sigma Dos/El Mundo	24–27 Apr	2,059	?	23.2; 99	30.5; 137	13.6; 39	5.9; 6	12.8; 32	1.2; 0	3.2; 13	2.3; 9	1.5; 6	0.9; 5	–	–	–	–	–	–	7.3
40dB/Prisa	21–25 Apr	2,000	?	24.8; 92/99	28.8; 115/127	14.1; 38/43		18.2; 48/59	2.1; 0/1	? 12	? 8	? 6	? 4	? 1	? 1	? 1	? 2	? 1	? 1	4.0
40dB/Prisa	21–25 Apr	2,000	?	25.1; 97/105	28.4; 119/126	14.5; 44/47	6.9; 10/13	10.9; 24/31	2.0; 0/1	? 12	? 9	? 6	? 6	? 1	? 2	? 2	? 2	? 1	? 1	3.3
KeyData/Público	21 Apr	?	69.0	24.2; 95	31.1; 135	15.0; 46	6.2; 9	9.7; 24	1.7; 0	3.4; 12	2.0; 8	1.5; 6	1.1; 5	1.0; 2	? 2	? 1	? 2	? 1	? 2	6.9
DYM/Henneo	19–21 Apr	1,008	?	24.7; 98/103	30.6; 127/132	14.6; 45/49	6.8; 7/10	9.2; 18/22	2.2; 0/1	–	–	–	–	–	–	–	–	–	–	5.9
Celeste-Tel/Onda Cero	17–21 Apr	1,100	64.9	23.7; 95	32.2; 136	14.5; 44	5.2; 4	9.8; 26	2.4; 1	3.3; 13	2.1; 8	1.5; 8	1.1; 5	0.9; 3	0.4; 2	0.7; 2	0.2; 1	0.2; 1	0.1; 1	8.5
EM-Analytics/Electomanía	15–21 Apr	2,624	?	24.9; 84	31.8; 139	14.5; 43		14.4; 46	2.6; 1	2.3; 9	2.0; 8	1.6; 7	1.3; 5	0.8; 1	0.6; 1	0.7; 1	0.3; 2	0.2; 1	0.2; 2	6.9
EM-Analytics/Electomanía	15–21 Apr	2,624	?	25.9; 104	30.5; 136	14.7; 46	4.7; 3	9.3; 15	2.6; 1	2.6; 12	2.0; 9	1.7; 8	1.3; 5	0.8; 2	0.6; 2	0.7; 2	0.3; 2	0.2; 1	0.2; 2	4.6
EM-Analytics/Electomanía	8–14 Apr	2,723	?	24.6; 83	31.8; 137	14.6; 45		14.3; 47	2.6; 1	2.4; 10	1.9; 8	1.7; 7	1.3; 5	0.8; 1	0.5; 0	0.7; 1	0.3; 2	0.2; 1	0.2; 2	7.2
EM-Analytics/Electomanía	8–14 Apr	2,723	?	25.8; 104	31.0; 136	14.5; 46	4.7; 3	9.1; 15	2.6; 1	2.5; 12	2.0; 9	1.7; 8	1.3; 5	0.8; 2	0.5; 2	0.7; 2	0.3; 2	0.2; 1	0.2; 2	5.2
Hamalgama Métrica/Vozpópuli	10–13 Apr	1,000	?	22.1; 92	32.2; 136	15.6; 52	5.6; 6	9.2; 21	1.5; 0	3.4; 13	2.1; 9	1.6; 7	1.2; 5	0.8; 2	0.5; 2	0.7; 2	0.2; 1	0.2; 1	0.1; 1	10.1
Simple Lógica/elDiario.es	3–12 Apr	1,014	65.3	26.2	28.1	15.4	6.3	9.7	2.0	–	–	–	–	–	–	–	–	–	–	1.9
SocioMétrica/El Español	4–8 Apr	900	?	23.7; 93	31.0; 136	15.3; 49	8.0; 18	7.6; 16	2.5; 0	2.5; 12	1.8; 8	1.2; 6	1.1; 5	0.7; 1	0.4; 1	0.6; 1	0.3; 2	0.1; 0	0.7; 2	7.3
EM-Analytics/Electomanía	2–7 Apr	2,314	?	24.0; 82	32.2; 138	14.5; 43		14.3; 47	2.7; 1	2.4; 10	2.0; 8	1.7; 7	1.3; 5	0.8; 1	0.6; 1	0.7; 1	0.3; 2	0.2; 1	0.2; 3	8.2
EM-Analytics/Electomanía	2–7 Apr	2,314	?	24.6; 100	31.7; 140	14.5; 46	5.0; 4	9.1; 15	2.7; 1	2.4; 11	2.0; 9	1.7; 8	1.3; 5	0.8; 2	0.6; 2	0.7; 2	0.3; 2	0.2; 1	0.2; 2	7.1
NC Report/La Razón	3–6 Apr	1,000	65.9	21.9; 89/91	33.1; 142/144	13.8; 41/43	5.1; 3/5	11.8; 28/30	1.7; 0	3.1; 12/13	–	–	–	–	–	–	–	–	–	11.2
Sigma Dos/El Mundo	3–5 Apr	1,755	?	22.8; 91	30.5; 135	13.9; 40		16.3; 45	2.0; 0	3.4; 13	2.5; 10	1.5; 6	0.9; 5	–	–	–	–	–	–	7.7
Sigma Dos/El Mundo	3–5 Apr	1,755	?	22.7; 91	30.2; 135	13.9; 41	5.5; 8	12.3; 35	2.0; 0	3.4; 14	2.5; 10	1.5; 6	0.9; 5	–	–	–	–	–	–	7.5
CIS	31 Mar–5 Apr	4,159	?	30.4	26.1	11.1	6.7	10.6	2.8	2.1	0.9	1.2	1.0	0.6	0.3	0.5	0.1	0.1	0.1	4.3
Data10/Okdiario	1–2 Apr	1,500	?		32.3; 132	15.4; 42	8.0; 15	30.4; 121	–	3.0; 13	–	–	–	–	–	–	–	–	–	1.9
Data10/Okdiario	1–2 Apr	1,500	?	20.7; 82	32.1; 134	15.5; 45		18.0; 50	–	2.9; 12	–	–	–	–	–	–	–	–	–	11.4
Data10/Okdiario	1–2 Apr	1,500	?	22.7; 95	31.9; 133	15.3; 43	7.1; 12	8.4; 23	–	2.9; 13	–	–	–	–	–	–	–	–	–	9.2

===== 2023 (Jan–Mar) =====
Polling firm/Commissioner	Fieldwork date	Sample size	Turnout	PSOE	PP	Vox	Unidas Podemos	CS	ERC–Sobiranistes	Más País	Junts	PNV	EH Bildu	CUP	CC–NCa	BNG	UPN	PRC	EV	Lead
EM-Analytics/Electomanía	22–30 Mar	?	?	25.9; 98	31.7; 136	14.5; 42	11.0; 28	2.7; 1	2.4; 11	1.9; 4	2.0; 8	1.7; 7	1.3; 5	0.8; 2	0.6; 1	0.7; 1	0.3; 2	0.2; 1	0.2; 2	5.8
40dB/Prisa	24–27 Mar	2,000	?	27.4; 104/117	28.0; 112/123	14.2; 41/48	11.8; 30/33	2.9; 1	? 13	3.2; 3	? 9	? 6	? 5	? 1	? 2	? 2	? 2	? 1	? 1	0.6
DYM/Henneo	23–24 Mar	1,008	?	28.2; 108/113	30.7; 126/131	15.3; 47/50	9.4; 18/21	2.2; 0/1	–	2.8; 2/3	–	–	–	–	–	–	–	–	–	2.5
GAD3/ABC	22–24 Mar	1,011	65	27.6; 107/111	32.4; 139/143	14.9; 43/45	8.9; 18/20	1.7; 0	2.3; 10	1.6; 2	1.9; 8	1.2; 6	1.0; 5	0.7; 2	0.5; 1	0.6; 1	0.2; 0	0.2; 1	0.1; 1	4.8
InvyMark/laSexta	20–24 Mar	?	?	27.8	30.4	14.0	9.8	0.9	–	3.1	–	–	–	–	–	–	–	–	–	2.6
GAD3/PP	20–24 Mar	2,500	?	26.7; 106	33.8; 143	14.7; 45	8.3; 20	–	–	–	–	–	–	–	–	–	–	–	–	7.1
KeyData/Público	23 Mar	?	68.8	25.8; 100	31.4; 135	14.7; 46	10.5; 26	1.9; 0	3.3; 12	1.6; 3	2.0; 8	1.5; 6	1.1; 5	1.0; 2	–	–	–	–	–	5.6
Data10/Okdiario	21–23 Mar	1,500	?	25.3; 97	31.8; 137	15.4; 47	10.1; 24	1.9; 0	3.0; 13	2.7; 3	2.0; 9	1.6; 6	1.5; 6	0.8; 2	0.5; 1	0.8; 2	0.2; 2	0.2; 1	0.1; 1	8.3
EM-Analytics/Electomanía	20–22 Mar	1,119	?	25.4; 96	32.1; 137	14.4; 42	11.2; 29	2.6; 1	2.4; 11	1.8; 4	2.1; 8	1.6; 7	1.3; 5	0.8; 2	0.6; 2	0.7; 1	0.3; 2	0.3; 1	0.2; 2	6.7
EM-Analytics/Electomanía	11–17 Mar	1,138	?	24.6; 93	32.7; 137	14.9; 45	11.3; 29	2.6; 1	2.4; 11	1.7; 4	2.0; 8	1.6; 7	1.3; 5	0.8; 2	0.6; 2	0.7; 1	0.4; 2	0.2; 1	0.3; 2	8.1
CIS (SocioMétrica)	1–11 Mar	3,788	60.0	28.6	31.9	15.1	8.8	2.6	2.5	2.0	1.3	1.4	0.9	0.6	0.8	0.6	0.1	0.0	0.3	3.3
CIS	1–11 Mar	3,788	?	32.7	28.0	10.1	10.0	2.4	2.5	1.4	1.1	1.1	0.7	0.5	0.4	0.7	0.3	0.1	0.1	4.7
EM-Analytics/Electomanía	6–10 Mar	1,007	?	24.8; 94	32.5; 136	15.0; 46	11.3; 29	2.6; 1	2.4; 11	1.7; 4	2.0; 8	1.5; 7	1.3; 5	0.8; 2	0.6; 1	0.8; 1	0.3; 2	0.2; 1	0.3; 2	7.7
InvyMark/laSexta	6–10 Mar	?	?	27.3	30.7	14.3	9.2	0.8	–	3.3	–	–	–	–	–	–	–	–	–	3.4
Hamalgama Métrica/Vozpópuli	3–8 Mar	1,000	?	24.3; 97	32.1; 133	15.8; 53	9.8; 24	1.4; 0	3.3; 12	2.4; 3	2.0; 8	1.6; 6	1.1; 5	0.9; 2	0.5; 2	0.7; 2	0.2; 1	0.2; 1	0.1; 1	7.8
Simple Lógica/elDiario.es	1–7 Mar	1,028	66.1	27.0	28.8	15.3	12.4	2.1	–	2.0	–	–	–	–	–	–	–	–	–	1.8
Celeste-Tel/Onda Cero	1–6 Mar	1,100	64.5	24.8; 98	32.7; 137	14.3; 45	10.2; 24	2.2; 1	3.3; 13	2.8; 4	2.1; 8	1.5; 6	1.3; 5	0.9; 2	0.4; 2	0.7; 2	0.2; 1	0.2; 1	0.1; 1	7.9
EM-Analytics/Electomanía	28 Feb–3 Mar	1,027	?	25.3; 96	32.2; 134	15.0; 47	11.1; 28	2.6; 1	2.4; 11	1.7; 4	2.0; 8	1.5; 6	1.3; 5	0.8; 2	0.6; 1	0.8; 2	0.3; 2	0.2; 1	0.3; 2	6.9
SocioMétrica/El Español	28 Feb–3 Mar	900	?	25.0; 97	31.6; 135	15.0; 46	11.2; 30	2.1; 0	2.5; 12	2.5; 3	1.8; 8	1.4; 6	1.1; 5	0.7; 1	0.3; 1	0.5; 1	0.4; 2	0.2; 1	0.8; 2	6.6
Sigma Dos/El Mundo	24 Feb–2 Mar	1,772	?	25.0; 97	31.5; 138	14.7; 44	9.8; 22	2.4; 0	3.4; 14	2.7; 3	2.5; 10	1.5; 6	–	–	–	–	–	–	–	6.5
GESOP/Prensa Ibérica	27 Feb–1 Mar	1,002	?	26.9; 104/108	29.8; 127/130	14.8; 44/47	11.8; 30/33	2.0; 0	2.0; 10/11	2.5; 2/3	1.8; 7/8	–	–	–	–	–	–	–	–	2.9
40dB/Prisa	23–26 Feb	2,000	?	26.4; 100/109	28.6; 121/124	14.1; 40/47	12.3; 31/35	2.5; 1	? 13	3.3; 3/4	? 8	? 6	? 5	? 1	? 2	? 2	? 2	? 1	? 1	2.2
NC Report/La Razón	20–24 Feb	1,000	66.2	24.2; 94/96	33.4; 139/141	13.8; 44/46	10.0; 24/26	1.9; 0	3.2; 12/13	2.9; 3	2.0; 7/8	1.5; 6	1.2; 5	–	–	–	–	–	–	9.2
InvyMark/laSexta	20–24 Feb	?	?	27.1	30.3	14.7	9.6	0.8	–	3.0	–	–	–	–	–	–	–	–	–	3.2
EM-Analytics/Electomanía	19–24 Feb	1,101	?	25.8; 95	31.9; 134	15.0; 47	11.0; 28	2.6; 1	2.4; 11	1.6; 4	2.0; 8	1.6; 6	1.3; 5	0.8; 2	0.6; 2	0.8; 2	0.3; 2	0.2; 1	0.3; 2	6.1
KeyData/Público	23 Feb	?	68.5	25.9; 99	31.1; 132	15.1; 48	10.4; 26	1.8; 0	3.3; 12	2.5; 3	2.1; 8	1.5; 6	1.1; 5	1.0; 2	? 2	? 2	? 2	? 1	? 2	5.2
Data10/Okdiario	21–23 Feb	1,500	?	25.0; 94	31.6; 136	15.7; 49	10.3; 25	1.9; 0	3.0; 13	2.5; 3	2.0; 9	1.6; 6	1.5; 6	0.9; 2	0.5; 1	0.8; 2	0.4; 2	0.2; 1	0.1; 1	6.6
GAD3/NIUS	20–22 Feb	1,001	68	26.9; 103/107	33.9; 146/150	13.4; 37/39	9.6; 20/22	1.4; 0	2.4; 10	2.4; 3	1.7; 7	1.4; 6	1.0; 5	0.8; 2	0.5; 2	0.7; 1	0.2; 0	0.2; 1	0.1; 1	7.0
Sigma Dos/Antena 3	16–22 Feb	?	?	25.2; 97/99	31.6; 136/138	14.6; 42/44	9.4; 20/22	2.5; 0/1	–	2.6; 3/4	–	–	–	–	–	–	–	–	–	6.4
DYM/Henneo	15–19 Feb	1,003	?	27.1; 103/107	32.4; 132/136	14.7; 45/48	9.2; 18/21	2.0; 0/1	–	2.6; 2/3	–	–	–	–	–	–	–	–	–	5.3
EM-Analytics/Electomanía	14–17 Feb	?	?	25.6; 95	32.1; 136	15.1; 47	10.8; 27	2.6; 1	2.4; 11	1.7; 4	2.0; 8	1.6; 7	1.3; 5	0.8; 2	0.5; 1	0.8; 2	0.3; 1	0.2; 1	0.2; 2	6.5
CIS (SocioMétrica)	1–11 Feb	3,935	62.6	26.3	31.9	15.0	11.5	2.0	1.7	1.9	0.9	1.1	1.0	0.5	0.2	0.5	0.4	0.2	0.1	5.6
CIS	1–11 Feb	3,935	?	32.1	29.8	10.0	12.7	2.0	2.0	1.3	1.1	0.8	1.1	0.5	0.4	0.6	0.5	0.1	0.1	2.3
EM-Analytics/Electomanía	7–10 Feb	1,084	?	25.6; 95	31.8; 136	15.0; 47	10.8; 28	2.6; 1	2.5; 11	1.6; 3	2.0; 8	1.6; 7	1.3; 5	0.8; 2	0.5; 1	0.8; 2	0.3; 1	0.2; 1	0.3; 2	6.2
InvyMark/laSexta	6–10 Feb	?	?	27.4	29.8	15.0	9.5	0.9	–	3.2	–	–	–	–	–	–	–	–	–	2.4
Hamalgama Métrica/Vozpópuli	6–9 Feb	1,000	?	24.4; 97	32.0; 132	16.0; 54	9.9; 24	1.5; 0	3.2; 12	2.5; 3	2.0; 8	1.5; 6	1.1; 5	0.9; 2	0.5; 2	0.7; 2	0.2; 1	0.2; 1	0.1; 1	7.6
Simple Lógica/elDiario.es	1–7 Feb	1,240	65.7	27.7	29.7	15.2	11.2	1.7	–	2.3	–	–	–	–	–	–	–	–	–	2.0
EM-Analytics/Electomanía	31 Jan–3 Feb	1,123	?	25.8; 96	31.7; 136	15.0; 47	10.9; 28	2.6; 1	2.5; 10	1.6; 3	2.0; 8	1.6; 7	1.3; 5	0.8; 2	0.5; 1	0.8; 2	0.3; 1	0.2; 1	0.3; 2	5.9
SocioMétrica/El Español	30 Jan–3 Feb	900	?	25.4; 96	31.1; 133	15.0; 50	10.8; 29	1.8; 0	2.7; 13	2.7; 3	1.9; 8	1.4; 6	1.1; 5	0.8; 1	0.3; 1	0.6; 1	0.3; 1	0.2; 1	0.9; 2	5.7
Sigma Dos/El Mundo	27 Jan–2 Feb	1,702	?	24.6; 94	31.1; 133	16.0; 50	10.2; 24	2.2; 1	3.3; 13	2.6; 3	2.5; 11	1.4; 6	–	–	–	–	–	–	–	6.5
40dB/Prisa	26–29 Jan	2,000	?	26.9; 101/112	28.7; 118/126	14.9; 42/49	11.5; 29/32	2.6; 1	? 12	2.9; 3	? 10	? 6	? 5	? 1	? 2	? 2	? 2	? 1	? 1	1.8
EM-Analytics/Electomanía	24–27 Jan	1,015	?	26.0; 99	31.4; 132	14.9; 45	11.1; 28	2.5; 1	2.5; 11	1.6; 4	2.0; 8	1.6; 7	1.3; 5	0.8; 2	0.5; 2	0.8; 2	0.3; 1	0.2; 1	0.2; 2	5.4
InvyMark/laSexta	23–27 Jan	?	?	27.5	29.6	14.7	9.8	1.0	–	3.4	–	–	–	–	–	–	–	–	–	2.1
Data10/Okdiario	24–26 Jan	1,500	?	25.0; 96	31.3; 134	15.8; 50	10.6; 25	1.7; 0	2.9; 12	2.4; 3	2.1; 9	1.6; 6	1.5; 6	0.8; 1	0.5; 1	0.8; 2	0.4; 2	0.2; 1	0.1; 1	6.3
Sigma Dos/Antena 3	25 Jan	?	?	24.8; 96/98	31.1; 133/135	15.2; 45/46	10.2; 24	2.0; 0/1	–	2.5; 3	–	–	–	–	–	–	–	–	–	6.3
DYM/Henneo	18–20 Jan	1,007	?	26.9; 102/106	31.6; 130/134	14.8; 46/49	9.6; 19/22	2.1; 0/1	–	2.1; 2/3	–	–	–	–	–	–	–	–	–	4.7
Celeste-Tel/Onda Cero	12–20 Jan	1,100	64.9	24.9; 99	32.4; 134	14.6; 47	10.4; 23	2.0; 1	3.3; 13	3.0; 4	2.1; 8	1.5; 7	1.3; 5	0.9; 2	0.5; 2	0.8; 2	0.2; 1	0.2; 1	0.1; 1	7.5
KeyData/Público	19 Jan	?	67.9	25.8; 100	31.2; 132	15.1; 48	10.3; 25	1.7; 0	3.5; 13	2.6; 3	2.1; 7	1.5; 6	1.1; 5	1.0; 2	? 2	? 2	? 2	? 1	? 2	5.4
EM-Analytics/Electomanía	16–19 Jan	1,209	?	26.1; 99	31.6; 134	15.0; 45	11.0; 28	2.4; 1	2.6; 12	1.7; 4	2.0; 8	1.7; 7	1.3; 5	0.8; 2	0.5; 0	0.8; 2	0.3; 1	0.2; 1	0.2; 1	5.5
Ágora Integral/Canarias Ahora	15 Jan	1,000	66.2	25.9; 101	32.3; 133	15.0; 47	11.7; 26	0.7; 0	3.7; 13	2.2; 3	1.7; 6	1.6; 6	1.1; 5	1.0; 2	0.4; 2	0.4; 2	0.4; 2	0.3; 1	0.8; 1	6.4
InvyMark/laSexta	9–13 Jan	?	?	27.1	29.8	15.1	10.2	0.9	–	2.9	–	–	–	–	–	–	–	–	–	2.7
EM-Analytics/Electomanía	7–12 Jan	1,032	?	25.6; 95	32.3; 135	15.0; 48	10.8; 27	2.3; 1	2.6; 12	1.7; 3	2.0; 8	1.6; 7	1.3; 5	0.8; 2	0.5; 0	0.8; 2	0.4; 2	0.2; 1	0.2; 2	6.7
CIS (SocioMétrica)	2–12 Jan	3,961	65.8	26.4	31.6	13.6	12.3	1.9	2.2	1.8	1.4	1.0	0.9	0.7	0.2	0.6	0.3	0.2	0.1	5.2
CIS	2–12 Jan	3,961	?	30.2	28.5	10.0	14.2	2.9	2.2	1.7	1.4	0.8	0.8	0.7	0.2	0.6	0.7	0.2	0.1	1.7
Hamalgama Métrica/Vozpópuli	5–11 Jan	1,000	?	24.5; 97	32.3; 134	15.6; 53	9.6; 23	1.6; 0	3.1; 12	2.6; 3	2.0; 8	1.5; 6	1.2; 5	0.9; 2	0.5; 2	0.6; 2	0.2; 1	0.2; 1	0.1; 1	7.8
Simple Lógica/elDiario.es	2–10 Jan	1,012	67.9	27.0	29.9	14.9	10.5	1.8	–	3.2	–	–	–	–	–	–	–	–	–	2.9
EM-Analytics/Electomanía	30 Dec–5 Jan	1,937	?	26.2; 99	32.0; 136	14.9; 45	10.5; 25	2.4; 1	2.6; 12	1.8; 4	2.0; 8	1.5; 6	1.3; 5	0.8; 2	0.5; 0	0.8; 2	0.4; 2	0.2; 1	0.2; 2	5.8
GAD3/NIUS	28 Dec–4 Jan	1,002	67	25.9; 98/102	33.2; 140/144	15.3; 45/47	10.1; 22/24	1.0; 0	2.6; 12	1.6; 2	2.0; 8	1.3; 6	1.0; 5	0.7; 2	0.4; 1	0.6; 1	0.2; 0	0.2; 1	0.1; 1	7.3

===== 2022 =====
Polling firm/Commissioner	Fieldwork date	Sample size	Turnout	PSOE	PP	Vox	Unidas Podemos	Cs	ERC–Sobiranistes	Más País	Junts	PNV	EH Bildu	CUP	CC–NCa	BNG	NA+ UPN	PRC	EV	Lead
40dB/Prisa	27–31 Dec	2,000	?	26.9; 102/112	28.9; 119/127	14.0; 39/46	11.5; 28/33	2.4; 0/1	? 13	3.6; 3/5	? 9	? 6	? 5	? 1	? 2	? 2	? 2	? 1	? 1	2.0
SocioMétrica/El Español	28–31 Dec	1,200	?	25.6; 98	30.9; 132	15.7; 52	10.2; 25	1.7; 0	2.8; 13	2.7; 3	1.9; 8	1.4; 6	1.1; 5	0.7; 1	0.3; 1	0.6; 1	0.4; 2	0.2; 1	1.0; 2	5.3
Sigma Dos/El Mundo	26–30 Dec	1,911	?	24.8; 93	30.9; 135	16.2; 52	9.6; 22	1.7; 0	3.5; 13	2.7; 3	2.4; 10	1.6; 7	–	–	–	–	–	–	–	6.1
Data10/Okdiario	27–29 Dec	1,000	?	24.6; 96	31.1; 131	16.2; 53	10.6; 25	1.8; 0	2.9; 12	2.5; 3	2.1; 9	1.5; 6	1.5; 6	0.9; 2	0.5; 1	0.8; 2	0.4; 2	0.2; 1	0.1; 1	6.5
EM-Analytics/Electomanía	25–29 Dec	1,711	?	25.7; 97	32.2; 136	15.2; 48	10.3; 24	2.5; 1	2.6; 12	1.9; 4	2.0; 8	1.4; 6	1.3; 5	0.8; 2	0.5; 0	0.8; 2	0.4; 2	0.2; 1	0.3; 2	6.5
Sigma Dos/Antena 3	28 Dec	?	?	25.1; 96/97	30.1; 131/132	16.2; 50/51	9.8; 23	2.2; 0/1	–	2.6; 3	–	–	–	–	–	–	–	–	–	5.0
Target Point/El Debate	26–28 Dec	1,000	?	25.3; 98/100	31.7; 133/135	15.5; 48/50	9.1; 21/23	1.6; 0	? 13/15	2.9; 3/4	? 7/8	? 6	? 5/6	? 1/2	–	–	–	–	–	6.4
InvyMark/laSexta	19–23 Dec	?	?	27.6	29.7	15.4	9.9	0.8	–	2.5	–	–	–	–	–	–	–	–	–	2.1
EM-Analytics/Electomanía	19–23 Dec	1,904	?	25.7; 96	31.6; 133	15.3; 49	10.9; 28	2.2; 0	2.5; 11	1.9; 4	2.1; 9	1.4; 6	1.3; 5	0.9; 2	0.5; 0	0.9; 2	0.4; 2	0.2; 1	0.3; 2	5.9
PP	22 Dec	?	?	26.7	31.1	–	–	–	–	–	–	–	–	–	–	–	–	–	–	4.4
KeyData/Público	21 Dec	?	67.7	26.0; 102	30.8; 130	14.9; 47	10.4; 26	1.8; 0	3.4; 13	2.7; 4	2.0; 7	1.5; 6	1.1; 5	1.0; 2	? 2	? 1	? 2	? 1	? 2	4.8
GAD3/PP	16–21 Dec	1,209	71.0	26.0; 104	33.2; 143	13.0; 39	10.4; 24	1.8; 0	3.0; 13	2.1; 3	1.8; 8	1.4; 6	1.1; 5	0.7; 1	0.3; 1	0.6; 1	0.2; 0	0.2; 1	0.1; 1	7.2
Celeste-Tel/Onda Cero	12–21 Dec	1,100	65.1	25.1; 101	32.3; 133	14.0; 45	10.5; 24	2.3; 1	3.3; 13	2.9; 4	2.1; 8	1.6; 7	1.3; 5	1.0; 2	0.5; 2	0.8; 2	0.2; 1	0.2; 1	0.1; 1	7.2
Metroscopia/Periodismo 2030	29 Nov–19 Dec	5,000	?	26.0; 95/103	29.5; 123/127	16.1; 51/56	11.4; 27/34	1.1; 0	2.9; 12/13	2.4; 3	1.9; 8	1.4; 6/7	1.0; 4/5	1.0; 2/3	0.4; 1/2	0.7; 2	0.4; 1/2	0.1; 0	0.1; 1	3.5
DYM/Henneo	14–17 Dec	1,014	?	27.0; 103/107	31.0; 128/133	15.5; 48/52	9.4; 18/22	2.0; 0/1	–	2.9; 2/3	–	–	–	–	–	–	–	–	–	4.0
NC Report/La Razón	13–17 Dec	1,000	65.8	23.6; 92/94	33.6; 141/143	13.1; 42/44	9.9; 25/27	1.8; 0	3.5; 13/14	3.3; 5	2.0; 7/8	1.5; 6/7	1.3; 5/6	–	–	–	0.2; 1	–	–	10.0
IMOP/El Confidencial	5–16 Dec	1,272	?	27.2; 108	29.4; 121	16.8; 54	9.8; 24	1.3; 0	3.2; 14	2.2; 3	1.6; 7	1.6; 6	1.3; 5	0.8; 2	0.4; 1	1.0; 2	0.3; 1	0.2; 1	0.1; 1	2.2
EM-Analytics/Electomanía	9–15 Dec	1,301	?	26.0; 97	31.0; 132	15.1; 49	11.2; 28	2.2; 0	2.5; 11	2.0; 4	2.1; 9	1.4; 6	1.3; 5	0.9; 2	0.5; 0	0.9; 2	0.4; 2	0.2; 1	0.3; 2	5.0
CIS (SocioMétrica)	1–14 Dec	3,821	63.6	27.7	30.2	15.2	10.8	1.6	2.2	1.5	1.3	1.5	0.7	0.5	0.2	0.5	0.5	0.0	0.1	2.5
CIS	1–14 Dec	3,821	?	30.6	28.6	10.2	12.4	2.9	2.4	2.0	1.4	1.1	0.8	0.6	0.3	0.6	0.5	0.1	0.1	2.0
Simple Lógica/elDiario.es	1–13 Dec	1,029	66.5	27.6	27.8	18.2	9.4	0.3	–	2.5	–	–	–	–	–	–	–	–	–	0.2
EM-Analytics/Electomanía	2–9 Dec	1,099	?	25.9; 96	31.3; 134	15.0; 48	11.1; 28	2.2; 0	2.5; 11	2.0; 4	2.1; 9	1.5; 6	1.3; 5	0.9; 2	0.5; 0	0.9; 2	0.4; 2	0.2; 1	0.3; 2	5.4
Hamalgama Métrica/Vozpópuli	2–7 Dec	1,000	?	24.8; 98	31.1; 131	15.7; 53	9.7; 24	1.7; 0	3.2; 12	2.7; 3	2.0; 8	1.5; 6	1.2; 5	0.9; 2	0.5; 2	0.6; 2	0.4; 2	0.2; 1	0.1; 1	6.3
InvyMark/laSexta	28 Nov–2 Dec	?	?	26.9	30.1	15.5	9.8	0.8	–	2.4	–	–	–	–	–	–	–	–	–	3.2
SocioMétrica/El Español	28 Nov–2 Dec	1,200	?	26.3; 101	30.1; 130	15.3; 48	11.1; 29	2.0; 0	2.9; 13	2.6; 3	1.8; 8	1.4; 6	1.2; 5	0.7; 1	0.4; 1	0.5; 1	0.3; 1	0.2; 1	0.4; 2	3.8
EM-Analytics/Electomanía	27 Nov–2 Dec	1,074	?	26.1; 99	31.0; 132	15.0; 47	11.0; 28	2.2; 0	2.5; 12	2.0; 4	2.1; 8	1.5; 6	1.3; 5	0.9; 2	0.5; 0	0.9; 2	0.4; 2	0.3; 1	0.3; 2	4.9
IMOP/El Confidencial	21 Nov–2 Dec	1,297	?	25.7; 100	30.5; 125	16.0; 51	11.6; 32	1.3; 0	–	1.9; 2	–	–	–	–	–	–	–	–	–	4.8
Data10/Okdiario	29 Nov–1 Dec	1,000	?	24.3; 93	30.9; 129	16.5; 56	11.0; 26	1.9; 0	3.0; 13	2.3; 3	2.1; 8	1.5; 6	1.4; 6	0.9; 3	0.5; 1	0.8; 2	0.4; 2	0.2; 1	0.1; 1	6.6
Sigma Dos/El Mundo	25–30 Nov	1,495	?	25.9; 106	29.1; 126/127	14.9; 44/45	9.9; 23	2.5; 0/1	3.3; 14	2.9; 4	2.4; 10	1.5; 6	–	–	–	–	–	–	–	3.2
40dB/Prisa	23–26 Nov	2,000	?	27.8; 107/120	28.1; 114/124	14.1; 40/48	11.4; 28/31	2.2; 0/1	? 13	3.6; 3/4	? 9	? 6	? 5	? 1	? 2	? 2	? 2	? 1	? 1	0.3
EM-Analytics/Electomanía	20–25 Nov	1,053	?	26.4; 101	30.8; 130	15.1; 47	11.1; 28	2.1; 0	2.5; 12	2.0; 4	2.1; 8	1.5; 6	1.3; 5	0.9; 2	0.5; 0	0.9; 2	0.4; 2	0.2; 1	0.3; 2	4.4
KeyData/Público	24 Nov	?	67.4	25.8; 101	30.8; 130	15.0; 49	10.6; 26	1.8; 0	3.4; 13	2.4; 3	2.0; 8	1.5; 6	1.1; 5	1.0; 2	? 1	? 1	? 2	? 1	? 2	5.0
GESOP/Prensa Ibérica	21–24 Nov	1,001	?	26.2; 106/108	28.6; 126/129	13.2; 39/41	12.2; 33/35	2.2; 0	2.8; 11/12	3.1; 3/4	1.5; 6/7	–	–	–	–	–	–	–	–	2.4
Sigma Dos/Antena 3	17–23 Nov	?	?	25.5; 98/99	29.9; 132	14.8; 46/47	10.3 ?	2.1 ?	3.4 ?	2.8 ?	2.3 ?	1.5 ?	–	–	–	–	–	–	–	4.4
GAD3/ABC	1 Sep–23 Nov	8,191	65	26.6; 109	34.0; 141	14.2; 41	8.9; 19	1.6; 0	3.1; 13	2.3; 3	2.0; 7	1.3; 6	1.0; 5	0.8; 2	0.3; 1	0.6; 1	0.1; 0	0.2; 1	0.1; 1	7.4
DYM/Henneo	16–22 Nov	1,003	?	26.8; 102/106	29.7; 124/128	16.8; 53/57	10.5; 21/23	2.4; 0/1	–	2.7; 2/3	–	–	–	–	–	–	–	–	–	2.9
IMOP/El Confidencial	7–20 Nov	1,309	?	26.1; 102	29.3; 121	16.7; 55	11.4; 30	1.7; 0	3.0; 13	2.3; 3	1.4; 6	1.6; 7	1.1; 5	0.8; 2	0.4; 1	1.0; 2	0.3; 1	0.2; 1	0.1; 1	3.2
EM-Analytics/Electomanía	12–18 Nov	1,037	?	26.7; 103	30.7; 130	14.7; 45	11.1; 27	2.1; 0	2.6; 12	2.1; 5	2.1; 8	1.5; 6	1.3; 5	0.8; 2	0.5; 0	0.9; 2	0.4; 2	0.2; 1	0.3; 2	4.0
InvyMark/laSexta	16–17 Nov	1,200	?	26.3	30.5	15.8	10.0	0.9	–	2.0	–	–	–	–	–	–	–	–	–	4.2
Target Point/El Debate	15–17 Nov	1,002	?	24.3; 98/100	31.1; 131/133	16.7; 50/52	9.8; 22/24	2.3; 0/1	? 13/14	3.1; 4/6	? 8/9	? 6/7	? 4/5	? 2	? 1/2	? 2/3	? 2	? 1	? 0/1	6.8
Celeste-Tel/Onda Cero	7–16 Nov	1,100	64.7	25.0; 100	32.8; 135	13.6; 43	10.3; 24	2.2; 1	3.3; 13	2.9; 4	2.1; 8	1.6; 7	1.3; 5	1.0; 2	0.5; 2	0.8; 2	0.4; 2	0.2; 1	0.1; 1	7.8
Ágora Integral/Canarias Ahora	7–14 Nov	1,000	?	26.4; 104	31.1; 132	13.2; 39	12.6 (Note: Includes Sumar.); 31	0.4; 0	3.4; 12	3.5; 5	1.9; 7	1.6; 6	1.2; 5	1.1; 2	0.4; 2	0.4; 1	0.4; 2	0.3; 1	0.1; 1	4.7
NC Report/La Razón	8–12 Nov	1,000	65.4	23.8; 90/92	34.0; 143/145	12.6; 39/41	9.9; 25/27	1.7; 0	3.5; 13/14	3.3; 5	2.0; 7/8	1.5; 6/7	1.3; 5/6	–	–	–	0.4; 2	–	–	10.2
CIS (SocioMétrica)	2–12 Nov	3,821	63.1	28.4	28.8	15.1	11.6	1.6	2.5	0.7	1.1	1.4	0.9	0.6	0.4	0.4	0.4	0.0	0.1	0.4
CIS	2–12 Nov	3,821	?	32.7	27.2	10.1	12.2	2.5	2.2	1.5	1.0	1.4	1.0	0.7	0.4	0.5	0.5	0.1	0.1	5.5
EM-Analytics/Electomanía	5–11 Nov	1,504	?	26.9; 107	30.6; 128	14.6; 44	11.1; 27	2.1; 0	2.7; 12	2.0; 4	2.1; 8	1.5; 6	1.3; 5	0.8; 2	0.5; 0	0.9; 2	0.4; 2	0.2; 1	0.2; 2	3.7
Simple Lógica/elDiario.es	2–11 Nov	996	66.1	27.6	29.6	15.7	11.1	1.7	–	1.5	–	–	–	–	–	–	–	–	–	2.0
Hamalgama Métrica/Vozpópuli	4–10 Nov	1,000	?	24.4; 96	31.7; 135	15.6; 53	9.0; 22	1.8; 0	3.3; 12	2.5; 3	2.0; 8	1.5; 6	1.2; 5	0.9; 2	0.5; 2	0.6; 2	0.4; 2	0.2; 1	0.1; 1	7.3
IMOP/El Confidencial	24 Oct–4 Nov	1,315	?	26.8; 105	30.3; 123	15.9; 51	11.3; 29	1.5; 0	2.8; 13	2.0; 3	1.5; 7	1.5; 6	1.2; 5	0.8; 2	0.3; 1	0.9; 2	0.3; 1	0.2; 1	0.1; 1	3.5
EM-Analytics/Electomanía	29 Oct–3 Nov	?	?	26.6; 101	30.6; 129	14.9; 46	11.4; 30	1.8; 0	2.7; 12	1.9; 4	2.1; 8	1.5; 6	1.3; 5	0.9; 2	0.4; 0	0.9; 2	0.4; 2	0.2; 1	0.3; 2	4.0
SocioMétrica/El Español	31 Oct–2 Nov	1,200	?	24.5; 96	30.8; 131	15.4; 50	10.4; 27	2.4; 1	2.9; 13	3.1; 4	1.9; 8	1.3; 6	1.1; 5	0.8; 2	0.4; 1	0.6; 1	0.4; 2	0.2; 1	0.6; 2	6.3
PSOE	31 Oct	?	?	29.0– 30.0	27.0– 28.0	12.0– 13.0	10.0– 11.0	–	–	–	–	–	–	–	–	–	–	–	–	2.0
Sigma Dos/El Mundo	24–31 Oct	2,503	?	26.0; 105	30.5; 132/133	14.3; 42	11.2; 25	2.2; 0/1	3.5; 14	2.4; 4	2.2; 8	1.6; 6	–	–	–	–	–	–	–	4.5
40dB/Prisa	27–30 Oct	2,000	?	26.8; 101/111	29.9; 123/132	13.8; 39/44	11.3; 25/32	2.3; 0/1	? 13	3.5; 4	? 9	? 6	? 5	? 1	? 2	? 2	? 2	? 1	? 1	3.1
InvyMark/laSexta	24–28 Oct	?	?	27.5	29.5	16.1	10.2	0.8	–	1.9	–	–	–	–	–	–	–	–	–	2.0
Data10/Okdiario	25–27 Oct	1,000	?	24.4; 95	31.4; 131	16.4; 54	10.8; 24	1.7; 0	3.0; 13	1.7; 2	2.3; 10	1.5; 6	1.5; 6	0.9; 2	0.5; 1	0.9; 2	0.4; 2	0.2; 1	0.1; 1	7.0
EM-Analytics/Electomanía	22–27 Oct	1,104	?	26.1; 98	30.9; 131	14.8; 45	11.5; 30	1.9; 0	2.7; 12	2.0; 4	2.2; 9	1.6; 7	1.3; 5	0.9; 2	0.4; 0	0.9; 2	0.4; 2	0.2; 1	0.3; 2	4.8
CIS (SocioMétrica)	11–26 Oct	5,557	63.3	28.5	32.8	13.5	8.7	1.4	2.6	1.2	1.6	1.2	1.0	0.9	0.4	0.7	0.4	0.2	0.0	4.3
CIS	11–26 Oct	5,557	?	32.9	29.5	9.3	11.5	2.1	2.7	1.3	1.7	1.0	1.0	0.6	0.2	0.9	0.3	0.1	0.1	3.4
DYM/Henneo	19–23 Oct	1,006	?	26.9; 104/108	30.8; 128/132	15.5; 49/53	9.7; 19/23	2.2; 0/1	–	2.9; 2/3	–	–	–	–	–	–	–	–	–	3.9
IMOP/El Confidencial	10–22 Oct	1,310	?	26.8; 103	30.0; 122	15.8; 51	11.6; 32	1.2; 0	3.0; 13	2.1; 3	1.5; 7	1.5; 6	1.2; 5	0.8; 2	0.3; 1	1.0; 2	0.3; 1	0.2; 1	0.1; 1	3.2
KeyData/Público	20 Oct	?	68.2	25.1; 97	31.8; 135	14.8; 48	10.6; 26	1.9; 0	3.2; 13	2.4; 3	2.0; 8	1.5; 6	1.0; 5	1.0; 2	? 1	? 1	? 2	? 1	? 2	6.7
EM-Analytics/Electomanía	15–20 Oct	1,307	?	25.6; 95	31.3; 133	14.9; 47	11.5; 29	2.0; 0	2.7; 12	2.0; 4	2.2; 9	1.6; 7	1.3; 5	0.9; 2	0.4; 0	0.9; 2	0.4; 2	0.2; 0	0.3; 2	5.7
Sigma Dos/Antena 3	16 Oct	?	?	25.9; 105	31.0; 134/135	14.1; 42	10.8; 24	2.1 ?	3.4 ?	2.5 ?	2.3 ?	1.6 ?	–	–	–	–	–	–	–	5.1
NC Report/La Razón	10–14 Oct	1,000	65.8	24.0; 91/93	34.1; 142/144	12.9; 39/41	9.7; 24/26	1.5; 0	3.3; 13	3.5; 6	2.2; 8/9	1.5; 6/7	1.3; 5/6	–	–	–	0.4; 2	–	–	10.1
Simple Lógica/elDiario.es	3–14 Oct	1,048	64.0	28.0	30.4	13.2	9.7	1.6	–	2.9	–	–	–	–	–	–	–	–	–	2.4
Target Point/El Debate	10–13 Oct	1,001	?	25.4; 98/100	31.2; 132/134	15.8; 48/50	10.2; 24/26	1.9; 0	? 13/14	2.6; 3/5	? 7/8	? 6/7	? 4/5	? 1/2	? 2	? 2/3	? 2	? 1	? 2	5.8
EM-Analytics/Electomanía	7–13 Oct	1,307	?	25.5; 95	31.2; 133	14.8; 47	11.6; 30	1.9; 0	2.8; 12	1.9; 4	2.2; 8	1.6; 7	1.3; 5	0.9; 2	0.5; 0	0.9; 2	0.3; 2	0.2; 1	0.3; 2	5.7
CIS (SocioMétrica)	1–10 Oct	3,713	65.4	27.1	32.1	13.6	11.7	2.1	1.9	1.5	1.4	1.0	1.0	0.6	0.4	0.5	0.3	0.0	0.0	5.0
CIS	1–10 Oct	3,713	?	32.7	28.7	8.8	12.7	2.7	2.1	1.1	1.5	1.2	0.9	0.5	0.4	0.6	0.4	0.1	0.1	4.0
IMOP/El Confidencial	26 Sep–8 Oct	1,313	?	24.6; 96	31.5; 129	16.8; 57	11.2; 27	1.7; 0	2.8; 12	1.9; 2	1.8; 8	1.4; 6	1.3; 6	0.7; 1	0.3; 1	1.0; 2	0.3; 1	0.2; 1	0.1; 1	6.9
InvyMark/laSexta	3–7 Oct	?	?	26.4	30.1	16.3	10.5	1.0	–	2.0	–	–	–	–	–	–	–	–	–	3.7
Hamalgama Métrica/Vozpópuli	3–6 Oct	1,000	?	23.6; 91	32.1; 138	16.0; 54	8.8; 22	1.8; 0	3.2; 12	2.6; 4	2.1; 8	1.5; 6	1.2; 5	0.9; 3	0.5; 2	0.6; 2	0.4; 2	0.2; 1	0.1; 1	8.5
EM-Analytics/Electomanía	1–6 Oct	1,104	?	25.1; 94	31.5; 134	14.9; 47	11.6; 30	1.8; 0	2.7; 12	2.0; 4	2.2; 9	1.7; 7	1.3; 5	0.9; 2	0.5; 0	0.9; 2	0.3; 2	0.2; 0	0.2; 2	6.4
Celeste-Tel/Onda Cero	26–30 Sep	1,100	64.9	24.1; 96	33.9; 140	12.4; 41	10.0; 23	2.2; 1	3.4; 13	3.2; 5	2.1; 8	1.7; 7	1.2; 5	1.1; 3	0.5; 2	0.8; 2	0.4; 2	0.2; 1	0.1; 1	9.8
SocioMétrica/El Español	26–30 Sep	1,200	?	23.9; 93	31.0; 131	15.6; 52	10.5; 27	2.6; 1	2.9; 13	3.2; 5	1.9; 8	1.3; 6	1.0; 5	0.8; 2	0.4; 1	0.6; 1	0.3; 2	0.3; 1	0.7; 2	7.1
EM-Analytics/Electomanía	26–30 Sep	1,156	?	24.5; 94	32.0; 134	14.9; 47	11.7; 30	1.8; 0	2.6; 12	2.0; 4	2.2; 9	1.7; 7	1.4; 5	0.9; 2	0.5; 0	1.0; 2	0.3; 2	0.2; 0	0.3; 2	7.5
Data10/Okdiario	27–29 Sep	1,000	?	23.3; 91	32.5; 135	17.2; 56	9.7; 21	1.8; 0	2.9; 12	2.1; 2	2.3; 11	1.4; 6	1.5; 6	0.9; 2	0.6; 2	0.9; 2	0.4; 2	0.2; 1	0.1; 1	9.2
Sigma Dos/El Mundo	26–29 Sep	1,541	?	25.6; 102	31.9; 137/138	14.1; 42	10.2; 24	2.3; 0/1	3.6; 13	2.6; 4	2.0; 8	1.7; 7	–	–	–	–	–	–	–	6.3
40dB/Prisa	22–26 Sep	2,000	?	26.3; 99/109	29.4; 121/128	14.2; 39/46	12.4; 31/35	2.2; 0/1	? 13	2.9; 3	? 9	? 6	? 5	? 1	? 2	? 2	? 2	? 1	? 1	3.1
IMOP/El Confidencial	12–24 Sep	1,271	?	25.0; 96	31.1; 128	16.9; 56	10.1; 24	1.2; 0	2.9; 13	2.2; 3	2.1; 9	1.4; 6	1.4; 6	0.7; 1	0.3; 1	1.1; 3	0.5; 2	0.2; 1	0.1; 1	6.1
InvyMark/laSexta	19–23 Sep	?	?	27.0	28.8	17.4	10.3	0.9	–	1.8	–	–	–	–	–	–	–	–	–	1.8
GAD3/NIUS	19–22 Sep	1,009	?	26.2; 101/105	34.8; 148/152	12.6; 36/38	9.4; 17/19	1.3; 0	2.7; 13	1.4; 2	1.9; 8	1.6; 6	1.2; 5	1.0; 3	0.5; 1	0.9; 2	0.2; 0	0.2; 1	0.1; 1	8.6
EM-Analytics/Electomanía	16–22 Sep	1,193	?	24.1; 91	32.4; 135	15.2; 48	11.4; 29	1.8; 0	2.6; 12	2.0; 4	2.2; 9	1.7; 7	1.2; 5	0.9; 2	0.6; 1	0.9; 2	0.3; 2	0.3; 1	0.3; 2	8.3
KeyData/Público	21 Sep	?	68.1	25.0; 97	31.6; 135	15.3; 49	10.5; 25	1.8; 0	3.2; 13	2.5; 3	2.0; 8	1.5; 6	1.3; 5	1.0; 2	? 1	? 1	? 2	? 1	? 2	6.6
DYM/Henneo	14–18 Sep	1,007	?	26.7; 103/107	31.0; 129/133	15.2; 48/52	10.4; 21/24	2.4; 0/1	–	3.0; 2/3	–	–	–	–	–	–	–	–	–	4.3
EM-Analytics/Electomanía	9–16 Sep	1,276	?	23.5; 88	32.3; 136	15.9; 51	11.3; 27	1.7; 0	2.6; 11	2.0; 4	2.3; 11	1.4; 6	1.4; 6	0.9; 2	0.5; 1	1.0; 2	0.3; 2	0.3; 1	0.3; 2	8.8
CIS (SocioMétrica)	1–10 Sep	3,837	62.4	26.3	31.4	14.1	11.1	1.5	2.1	1.9	1.5	1.0	0.9	0.8	0.1	0.5	0.4	0.0	0.0	5.1
CIS	1–10 Sep	3,837	?	29.2	28.5	10.3	12.8	2.8	2.4	1.9	1.4	1.0	0.7	0.8	0.1	0.5	0.6	0.1	0.1	0.7
IMOP/El Confidencial	29 Aug–10 Sep	1,297	?	24.2; 94	31.8; 130	16.0; 54	10.7; 25	1.1; 0	3.0; 13	2.4; 3	2.1; 9	1.4; 6	1.4; 6	0.8; 2	0.4; 1	1.1; 3	0.4; 2	0.2; 1	0.1; 1	7.6
GAD3/ABC	6–9 Sep	1,000	?	26.9; 104/108	35.1; 147/151	13.4; 38/40	8.6; 14/16	1.3; 0	3.1; 13	1.4; 1	2.1; 8	1.4; 6	1.0; 5	0.9; 3	0.4; 1	0.8; 2	0.2; 0	0.2; 1	0.1; 1	8.2
EM-Analytics/Electomanía	5–9 Sep	1,013	?	23.3; 86	32.5; 137	16.0; 51	11.3; 28	1.7; 0	2.7; 12	2.0; 4	2.2; 9	1.6; 6	1.4; 6	0.9; 2	0.6; 1	1.0; 2	0.3; 2	0.3; 1	0.3; 3	9.2
Simple Lógica/elDiario.es	1–9 Sep	1,044	64.8	25.8	29.4	17.3	8.8	2.9	–	2.7	–	–	–	–	–	–	–	–	–	3.6
Target Point/El Debate	7–8 Sep	1,001	?	24.0; 91/93	33.0; 139/141	15.3; 47/49	9.5; 21/23	2.0; 0/1	? 13/15	3.6; 5/7	? 7/8	? 5/6	? 5/6	? 1/2	? 2	? 2/3	? 2	? 1	? 2	9.0
Sigma Dos/Antena 3	2–8 Sep	?	?	24.8; 97	31.1; 134/135	14.3; 44	10.8; 25	1.9; 0/1	3.6; 14	3.5; 7	2.1; 8	1.7; 7	–	–	–	–	–	–	–	6.3
SocioMétrica/El Español	29 Aug–3 Sep	1,200	?	23.2; 90	31.4; 134	16.0; 53	10.1; 24	2.3; 1	2.7; 13	3.2; 5	1.9; 8	1.4; 6	1.2; 5	0.9; 3	0.4; 1	0.6; 1	0.3; 2	0.3; 1	1.1; 3	8.2
Ágora Integral/Canarias Ahora	1–2 Sep	1,000	?	24.9; 92	32.9; 137	14.3; 49	11.8; 30	0.5; 0	3.5; 12	2.7; 3	2.0; 8	1.6; 6	1.2; 5	1.1; 2	0.5; 2	0.4; 1	? 2	0.3; 1	0.2; 0	8.0
Sigma Dos/El Mundo	29 Aug–2 Sep	?	?	24.2; 92	31.7; 137	14.6; 46	10.6; 25	1.8; 0	3.7; 14	3.4; 7	2.2; 8	1.8; 7	–	–	–	–	–	–	–	7.5
EM-Analytics/Electomanía	27 Aug–2 Sep	1,007	?	23.5; 87	32.2; 135	16.2; 52	11.3; 28	1.7; 0	2.7; 12	2.0; 4	2.2; 9	1.5; 6	1.4; 6	0.9; 2	0.6; 1	1.0; 2	0.3; 2	0.3; 1	0.4; 3	8.7
Data10/Okdiario	30 Aug–1 Sep	1,000	?	22.8; 87	32.4; 135	17.6; 59	10.0; 21	1.7; 0	2.9; 12	2.3; 3	2.3; 11	1.4; 6	1.6; 7	0.9; 2	0.5; 1	0.8; 2	0.4; 2	0.2; 1	0.1; 1	9.6
KeyData/Público	31 Aug	?	67.9	24.1; 94	32.4; 136	14.9; 49	10.1; 24	1.8; 0	3.0; 13	2.9; 4	2.1; 8	1.6; 6	1.3; 6	1.0; 2	0.5; 2	? 1	? 2	? 1	? 2	8.3
40dB/Prisa	23–28 Aug	2,000	?	26.4; 100/109	27.9; 117/123	15.0; 44/51	11.9; 30/35	2.6; 1	? 13	3.1; 3	? 10	? 6	? 5	? 1	? 2	? 2	? 2	? 1	? 1	1.5
NC Report/La Razón	23–27 Aug	1,000	?	23.8; 90/92	34.0; 140/142	13.2; 41/43	9.7; 23/25	–	3.2; 12/13	2.5; 4/5	2.1; 8	1.5; 6	1.3; 5/6	–	–	–	–	–	–	10.2
EM-Analytics/Electomanía	22–26 Aug	1,211	?	23.3; 86	32.1; 136	16.4; 52	11.5; 28	1.7; 0	2.7; 12	2.0; 4	2.2; 9	1.5; 6	1.4; 6	0.9; 2	0.6; 1	1.0; 2	0.3; 2	0.3; 1	0.3; 3	8.8
Celeste-Tel/Onda Cero	16–20 Aug	1,100	64.6	24.3; 97	33.0; 136	13.7; 43	10.1; 23	2.4; 1	3.2; 13	3.4; 6	2.1; 8	1.6; 7	1.2; 5	1.0; 3	0.5; 2	0.8; 2	0.4; 2	0.2; 1	0.1; 1	8.7
EM-Analytics/Electomanía	1–19 Aug	1,947	?	22.6; 83	31.7; 132	16.7; 55	11.8; 30	1.7; 0	2.7; 12	1.9; 4	2.4; 11	1.5; 6	1.3; 6	0.9; 2	0.6; 1	1.0; 2	0.3; 2	0.3; 1	0.4; 3	9.1
EM-Analytics/Electomanía	1–12 Aug	1,380	?	22.7; 85	31.2; 130	17.3; 56	11.8; 29	1.8; 0	2.5; 11	2.3; 5	2.3; 11	1.3; 6	1.4; 6	0.9; 2	0.5; 1	0.9; 2	0.3; 2	0.3; 1	0.3; 3	8.5
Hamalgama Métrica/Vozpópuli	5–10 Aug	1,000	?	24.1; 93	31.2; 132	16.6; 56	9.0; 23	2.4; 0	3.1; 12	2.8; 4	2.0; 8	1.5; 6	1.2; 5	0.9; 3	0.5; 2	0.7; 2	0.4; 2	0.2; 1	0.1; 1	7.1
Simple Lógica/elDiario.es	1–8 Aug	1,078	62.8	26.0	31.4	14.5	10.6	1.6	–	3.5	–	–	–	–	–	–	–	–	–	5.4
EM-Analytics/Electomanía	31 Jul–5 Aug	1,016	?	22.8; 86	31.1; 129	17.4; 58	11.7; 27	1.8; 0	2.6; 11	2.3; 5	2.3; 11	1.3; 6	1.4; 6	0.9; 2	0.5; 1	0.9; 2	0.4; 2	0.3; 1	0.4; 3	8.3
EM-Analytics/Electomanía	23–29 Jul	1,013	?	22.8; 86	30.9; 128	18.0; 59	11.6; 27	1.7; 0	2.5; 11	2.2; 5	2.4; 11	1.2; 6	1.4; 6	0.9; 2	0.5; 1	0.9; 2	0.4; 2	0.2; 1	0.3; 3	8.1
IMOP/El Confidencial	18–29 Jul	1,290	?	24.2; 93	33.4; 137	15.7; 51	9.8; 23	0.8; 0	2.9; 13	2.4; 3	1.9; 8	1.4; 6	1.5; 6	0.9; 3	0.3; 1	1.1; 3	0.3; 1	0.2; 1	0.1; 1	9.2
Sigma Dos/Antena 3	18–22 Jul	?	?	25.2; 98/99	31.0; 134	14.4; 45	10.0; 22	2.0 ?	3.5 ?	3.4 ?	2.3 ?	1.9 ?	–	–	–	–	–	–	–	5.8
EM-Analytics/Electomanía	15–22 Jul	1,022	?	23.0; 86	30.8; 128	17.9; 59	11.5; 27	1.7; 0	2.6; 11	2.3; 5	2.3; 11	1.2; 6	1.4; 6	0.9; 2	0.5; 1	0.9; 2	0.4; 2	0.3; 1	0.4; 3	7.8
KeyData/Público	21 Jul	?	68.3	24.2; 97	30.0; 128	16.3; 54	10.8; 26	2.1; 0	3.4; 13	2.7; 2	2.1; 8	1.5; 6	1.3; 6	1.0; 2	0.5; 2	? 1	? 2	? 1	? 2	5.8
NC Report/La Razón	18–21 Jul	1,000	65.7	24.5; 93/95	32.2; 138/140	14.4; 43/45	9.7; 23/25	2.0; 1	3.3; 12/13	3.0; 5/6	2.1; 8	1.5; 6	1.2; 5/6	–	–	–	0.4; 2	–	–	7.7
DYM/Henneo	14–17 Jul	1,000	?	25.2; 96/99	31.0; 130/134	15.3; 49/53	10.9; 23/26	2.6; 0/1	–	3.1; 2/3	–	–	–	–	–	–	–	–	–	5.8
SocioMétrica/El Español	14–16 Jul	1,919	?	23.8; 93	28.0; 121	17.4; 59	10.8; 27	2.6; 1	2.9; 13	3.1; 5	1.9; 8	1.5; 6	1.4; 6	0.9; 2	0.5; 2	0.7; 2	0.4; 2	0.3; 1	0.9; 2	4.2
EM-Analytics/Electomanía	9–15 Jul	1,148	?	23.1; 85	30.3; 127	18.2; 58	11.4; 27	1.6; 0	2.7; 12	2.4; 5	2.4; 11	1.2; 6	1.4; 6	0.9; 2	0.5; 1	0.9; 2	0.4; 2	0.2; 1	0.5; 4	7.2
IMOP/El Confidencial	4–15 Jul	1,290	?	24.0; 94	30.8; 129	16.9; 55	10.1; 24	1.3; 0	3.2; 13	2.8; 4	1.8; 8	1.4; 6	1.4; 6	0.9; 3	0.3; 1	1.1; 3	0.3; 2	0.2; 1	0.1; 2	6.8
Data10/Okdiario	14 Jul	1,000	?	23.0; 87	31.2; 133	19.2; 63	9.8; 20	1.6; 0	3.1; 13	2.2; 2	2.2; 9	1.5; 6	1.5; 7	0.9; 2	0.6; 2	0.7; 2	0.4; 2	0.2; 1	0.1; 1	8.2
GAD3/NIUS	12–14 Jul	1,000	65	24.4; 93/97	35.0; 150/154	13.8; 38/40	9.7; 20/22	1.2; 0	3.1; 13	2.4; 3	2.1; 8	1.6; 7	1.2; 5	0.9; 3	0.4; 1	0.6; 1	0.2; 0	0.2; 1	0.1; 1	10.6
Celeste-Tel/Onda Cero	7–12 Jul	1,100	64.9	25.2; 98	30.8; 131	15.0; 47	10.3; 25	2.9; 1	3.2; 12	3.4; 6	2.0; 8	1.5; 7	1.2; 5	1.0; 2	0.6; 2	0.8; 2	0.4; 2	0.2; 1	0.1; 1	5.6
CIS	1–12 Jul	3,988	?	28.2	30.1	12.0	13.4	1.7	2.9	1.9	1.2	1.4	1.0	0.9	0.3	0.5	0.4	0.2	0.1	1.9
Simple Lógica/elDiario.es	1–11 Jul	1,044	69.8	25.3	33.0	14.1	12.0	1.6	–	2.8	–	–	–	–	–	–	–	–	–	7.7
Merca2	7–9 Jul	1,054	?	23.8; 93/97	34.3; 142/146	14.2; 39/42	11.9; 27	? 0	? 14	? 3	? 6	? 6	? 5	? 2	? 2	? 1	? 0	? 1	? 2	10.5
Hamalgama Métrica/Vozpópuli	5–8 Jul	1,000	?	24.5; 96	30.4; 129	16.9; 58	9.1; 23	2.8; 0	3.3; 11	3.0; 5	2.0; 8	1.6; 5	1.1; 5	0.9; 2	0.5; 2	0.7; 2	0.4; 2	0.2; 1	0.1; 1	5.9
EM-Analytics/Electomanía	3–8 Jul	1,237	?	23.3; 85	29.9; 126	18.6; 59	11.5; 28	1.6; 0	2.9; 12	2.4; 5	2.4; 11	1.3; 6	1.4; 6	0.9; 2	0.5; 1	0.9; 2	0.4; 2	0.3; 1	0.4; 3	6.6
Target Point/El Debate	5–7 Jul	1,001	?	24.3; 91/93	30.6; 130/132	17.0; 54/56	9.8; 24/26	2.0; 0/1	? 13/15	3.0; 4/5	? 6/7	? 6/7	? 5	? 2/3	? 2	? 2	? 2	? 1	? 1/2	6.3
GAD3/ABC	4–6 Jul	1,003	?	24.3; 94/98	36.3; 155/159	13.6; 37/39	8.9; 16/18	1.1; 0	3.0; 13	2.1; 3	2.0; 8	1.5; 7	1.1; 5	0.9; 2	0.4; 1	0.6; 1	0.2; 0	0.2; 1	0.1; 1	12.0
SW Demoscopia	29 Jun–1 Jul	1,002	?	24.7; 105	23.8; 99	19.8; 67	10.9; 29	1.7; 0	3.8 ?	2.8 ?	1.8 ?	1.7 ?	1.4 ?	1.0 ?	0.5 ?	–	0.2 ?	0.2 ?	–	0.9
EM-Analytics/Electomanía	27 Jun–1 Jul	1,003	?	24.1; 89	28.6; 119	19.3; 62	11.6; 28	1.6; 0	2.6; 11	2.4; 5	2.4; 11	1.3; 6	1.4; 6	1.0; 2	0.5; 2	0.9; 2	0.4; 2	0.3; 1	0.4; 3	4.5
IMOP/El Confidencial	20 Jun–1 Jul	1,307	?	23.8; 95	30.3; 128	16.5; 55	9.6; 23	2.0; 0	2.9; 13	3.3; 5	1.9; 8	1.5; 6	1.3; 6	0.9; 3	0.4; 1	1.2; 3	0.4; 2	0.2; 1	0.1; 1	6.5
Data10/Okdiario	29–30 Jun	1,000	?	22.6; 86	31.3; 134	19.4; 63	10.0; 22	1.5; 0	3.2; 14	2.4; 2	2.1; 9	1.5; 6	1.4; 6	0.8; 2	0.5; 1	0.6; 2	0.4; 2	0.2; 1	0.1; 1	8.7
Sigma Dos/El Mundo	27–29 Jun	1,212	?	24.9; 95	30.2; 133	15.4; 48	10.7; 25	2.4; 1	3.4; 13	3.0; 7	2.2; 8	1.8; 7	–	–	–	–	–	–	–	5.3
40dB/Prisa	23–27 Jun	2,000	?	26.3; 99/107	27.4; 109/122	15.9; 47/59	11.7; 29/35	2.9; 1/2	? 12	3.0; 3	? 10	? 6	? 5	? 1	? 2	? 2	? 2	? 1	? 1	1.1
Sigma Dos/Antena 3	26 Jun	?	?	25.2; 96	31.1; 135	15.0; 47	10.5; 24	2.3; 1	3.3; 13	2.9; 6	2.2; 8	1.7; 7	–	–	–	–	–	–	–	5.9
SocioMétrica/El Español	21–24 Jun	1,200	?	23.0; 85	31.2; 135	16.2; 53	11.0; 29	2.0; 0	2.9; 13	3.1; 5	1.9; 8	1.5; 6	1.3; 6	1.0; 3	0.6; 2	0.6; 1	0.3; 2	0.2; 1	1.1; 3	8.2
InvyMark/laSexta	20–24 Jun	?	?	25.2	29.3	19.2	9.5	0.8	–	1.5	–	–	–	–	–	–	–	–	–	4.1
EM-Analytics/Electomanía	19–24 Jun	2,087	?	23.6; 87	27.9; 111	19.9; 70	11.9; 30	1.5; 0	2.6; 11	2.5; 5	2.4; 11	1.4; 6	1.4; 6	1.0; 2	0.5; 2	1.0; 2	0.4; 2	0.3; 1	0.4; 3	4.3
KeyData/Público	23 Jun	?	69.0	25.0; 100	28.7; 121	16.6; 56	11.0; 27	2.1; 1	3.5; 13	2.8; 2	2.1; 8	1.6; 6	1.1; 5	1.2; 3	0.5; 2	? 1	? 2	? 1	? 2	3.7
GESOP/Prensa Ibérica	20–22 Jun	1,001	?	23.9; 93/96	31.5; 140/144	13.2; 37/39	11.7; 29/32	2.0; 0	2.9; 12/13	3.0; 2/3	1.7; 7/8	–	–	–	–	–	–	–	–	7.6
Data10/Okdiario	20 Jun	1,000	?	22.4; 85	30.9; 132	19.7; 63	10.3; 23	1.7; 0	3.0; 13	2.5; 2	2.2; 10	1.5; 6	1.4; 6	0.8; 2	0.5; 2	0.7; 2	0.4; 2	0.2; 1	0.1; 1	8.5
EM-Analytics/Electomanía	7–10 Jun	1,093	?	25.0; 90	23.6; 96	22.2; 82	12.0; 30	2.5; 1	2.5; 11	2.4; 5	2.3; 10	1.3; 6	1.3; 6	1.0; 2	0.6; 2	0.9; 2	0.4; 2	0.2; 1	0.4; 3	1.4
Simple Lógica/elDiario.es	1–9 Jun	1,055	63.7	25.2	26.8	19.6	11.1	2.3	–	1.2	–	–	–	–	–	–	–	–	–	1.6
CIS	1–9 Jun	3,623	?	29.2	27.0	16.5	9.8	1.9	2.4	1.9	1.2	1.4	0.8	0.8	0.3	0.6	0.4	0.1	0.1	2.2
InvyMark/laSexta	30 May–3 Jun	?	?	26.7	26.1	19.6	10.0	1.3	–	1.7	–	–	–	–	–	–	–	–	–	0.6
EM-Analytics/Electomanía	28 May–2 Jun	1,124	?	25.1; 93	23.4; 94	22.1; 81	12.1; 30	2.5; 1	2.5; 11	2.5; 5	2.3; 10	1.3; 6	1.3; 6	1.0; 2	0.6; 2	0.9; 2	0.4; 2	0.2; 1	0.4; 3	1.7
Data10/Okdiario	31 May–1 Jun	1,000	?	24.0; 91	24.0; 98	22.6; 86	10.9; 26	2.4; 1	3.1; 13	2.9; 3	2.4; 9	1.5; 6	1.3; 6	1.0; 2	0.5; 2	0.7; 2	0.4; 2	0.2; 1	0.1; 1	Tie
EM-Analytics/Electomanía	21–27 May	1,204	?	25.0; 92	23.3; 93	22.2; 82	12.1; 31	2.5; 1	2.6; 11	2.5; 5	2.3; 10	1.4; 6	1.3; 6	1.0; 2	0.6; 2	0.9; 2	0.4; 2	0.2; 1	0.4; 3	1.7
KeyData/Público	26 May	?	67.5	26.0; 105	25.6; 103	19.2; 69	11.0; 27	2.5; 1	3.4; 13	2.8; 3	2.1; 8	1.5; 6	1.1; 5	1.0; 2	0.5; 2	? 1	? 2	? 1	? 2	0.4
40dB/Prisa	18–23 May	2,000	?	27.2; 103/115	26.4; 106/120	16.2; 48/56	11.5; 27/33	3.3; 1/2	? 12	2.8; 3	? 10	? 6	? 5	? 2	? 1	? 2	? 2	? 1	? 1	0.8
IMOP/El Confidencial	9–21 May	1,303	?	25.5; 103	26.0; 106	20.3; 71	10.6; 27	1.9; 0	3.0; 13	2.4; 2	1.8; 7	1.6; 7	1.2; 5	1.0; 3	0.3; 1	1.1; 2	0.3; 1	0.2; 1	0.1; 1	0.5
EM-Analytics/Electomanía	14–19 May	1,876	?	24.2; 88	23.5; 95	22.5; 85	12.1; 30	2.6; 1	2.6; 11	2.5; 5	2.3; 10	1.4; 6	1.4; 6	1.0; 2	0.6; 2	0.9; 2	0.4; 2	0.2; 1	0.4; 3	0.7
CEMOP	25 Apr–18 May	1,236	?	27.2	28.3	16.7	12.9	1.1	–	–	–	–	–	–	–	–	–	–	–	1.1
SW Demoscopia	9–14 May	1,203	?	25.9; 107	22.7; 91	21.4; 79	9.8; 25	2.2; 1	3.8 ?	3.1 ?	1.9 ?	1.7 ?	1.2 ?	0.9 ?	0.5 ?	–	0.2 ?	0.2 ?	–	3.2
DYM/Henneo	11–13 May	1,011	?	26.3; 103/108	28.4; 118/121	16.0; 53/57	11.5; 24/27	3.1; 1/2	–	3.2; 2/3	–	–	–	–	–	–	–	–	–	2.1
Celeste-Tel/Onda Cero	9–13 May	1,100	65.2	26.3; 104	26.9; 109	17.6; 63	10.7; 25	2.8; 1	3.1; 12	3.3; 6	2.0; 8	1.5; 7	1.1; 5	0.9; 2	0.6; 2	0.8; 2	0.4; 2	0.2; 1	0.1; 1	0.6
EM-Analytics/Electomanía	6–13 May	1,439	?	24.5; 91	22.4; 89	22.7; 85	12.3; 33	2.7; 1	2.8; 12	2.4; 5	2.3; 9	1.5; 6	1.4; 6	1.0; 2	0.7; 2	0.9; 2	0.4; 2	0.2; 1	0.4; 3	1.8
CIS	3–12 May	3,865	?	30.3	28.7	16.6	9.6	1.8	2.5	2.1	1.2	1.3	1.1	0.6	0.3	0.5	0.2	0.1	0.1	1.6
Simple Lógica/elDiario.es	3–11 May	1,049	66.4	25.7	29.2	18.3	10.4	2.8	–	2.4	–	–	–	–	–	–	–	–	–	3.5
Ágora Integral/Canarias Ahora	5–9 May	1,000	62.5	24.1; 102	24.5; 103	18.5; 67	13.5; 30	2.3; 0	3.7; 13	3.7; 3	2.1; 8	1.4; 6	1.2; 5	1.0; 2	0.4; 2	0.7; 2	? 2	0.2; 1	0.7; 4	0.4
IMOP/El Confidencial	25 Apr–8 May	1,303	?	26.3; 104	26.4; 105	19.8; 69	10.6; 29	1.9; 0	2.9; 13	1.9; 2	1.8; 8	1.6; 7	1.2; 5	0.9; 2	0.3; 1	0.9; 2	0.2; 1	0.2; 1	0.1; 1	0.1
SocioMétrica/El Español	4–7 May	1,200	?	25.3; 101	25.0; 102	19.1; 68	11.3; 29	2.7; 1	3.0; 13	3.0; 5	1.9; 8	1.6; 7	1.2; 5	0.9; 2	0.5; 2	0.7; 2	0.4; 2	0.1; 0	1.2; 3	0.3
Data10/Okdiario	5–6 May	1,000	?	23.9; 89	24.1; 100	22.4; 86	11.2; 28	2.2; 0	3.2; 13	3.0; 3	2.2; 9	1.6; 7	1.2; 5	0.9; 2	0.5; 2	0.8; 2	0.4; 2	0.2; 1	0.1; 1	0.2
EM-Analytics/Electomanía	29 Apr–6 May	1,352	?	24.5; 91	22.0; 87	22.8; 85	12.3; 35	2.8; 1	2.9; 12	2.4; 5	2.3; 9	1.5; 6	1.4; 6	1.0; 2	0.7; 2	0.9; 2	0.4; 2	0.2; 1	0.4; 3	1.7
EM-Analytics/Electomanía	22–29 Apr	3,013	?	24.6; 92	21.8; 86	22.9; 87	12.2; 32	2.7; 1	3.0; 13	2.5; 5	2.3; 9	1.6; 6	1.4; 6	1.0; 2	0.5; 2	0.9; 2	0.4; 2	0.2; 1	0.4; 3	1.7
40dB/Prisa	20–25 Apr	2,000	?	26.2; 101/110	25.8; 101/115	18.1; 60/66	10.2; 22/29	3.4; 2	? 12	3.2; 4	? 9	? 6	? 5	? 2	? 1	? 2	? 2	? 1	? 1	0.4
IMOP/El Confidencial	11–23 Apr	1,323	?	25.7; 102	25.5; 104	19.0; 72	11.6; 29	1.7; 0	3.0; 13	2.6; 3	1.8; 7	1.5; 7	1.2; 5	0.8; 2	0.3; 1	1.0; 2	0.2; 1	0.2; 1	0.1; 1	0.2
DYM/Henneo	20–22 Apr	1,012	?	26.5; 104/109	27.6; 115/119	16.8; 54/58	11.0; 23/27	2.9; 1/2	–	3.7; 3/5	–	–	–	–	–	–	–	–	–	1.1
InvyMark/laSexta	18–22 Apr	?	?	27.6	24.3	20.3	11.0	1.3	–	2.0	–	–	–	–	–	–	–	–	–	3.3
EM-Analytics/Electomanía	15–22 Apr	1,873	?	24.7; 92	20.8; 84	23.2; 85	12.6; 36	2.9; 1	2.8; 12	2.5; 5	2.4; 9	1.6; 7	1.3; 5	1.0; 2	0.6; 3	0.9; 2	0.4; 2	0.2; 1	0.4; 3	1.5
KeyData/Público	20 Apr	?	69.0	26.0; 106	25.9; 105	18.7; 66	10.9; 27	2.4; 1	3.5; 13	2.3; 3	2.0; 8	1.5; 6	1.1; 5	1.0; 2	0.5; 2	? 1	? 2	? 1	? 2	0.1
Celeste-Tel/Onda Cero	11–20 Apr	1,100	64.8	26.4; 104	27.1; 110	17.1; 61	10.9; 26	3.0; 1	3.2; 12	3.1; 6	2.0; 8	1.5; 7	1.1; 5	0.9; 2	0.6; 2	0.8; 2	0.4; 2	0.2; 1	0.1; 1	0.7
SW Demoscopia	11–18 Apr	1,205	?	25.3; 109	23.6; 93	20.7; 72	10.2; 27	2.4; 1	3.6 ?	2.9 ?	2.0 ?	1.6 ?	1.1 ?	0.9 ?	0.6 ?	–	0.3 ?	0.2 ?	–	1.7
NC Report/La Razón	11–15 Apr	1,000	63.3	25.4; 99/101	29.5; 123/125	16.3; 53/55	10.1; 25/27	3.0; 1	3.3; 12	2.3; 5	2.1; 8	1.5; 6	1.0; 5	–	–	–	–	–	–	4.1
EM-Analytics/Electomanía	8–15 Apr	1,301	?	24.8; 92	20.0; 78	23.7; 90	12.6; 35	2.9; 1	2.9; 12	2.6; 5	2.4; 9	1.6; 7	1.4; 6	1.0; 2	0.6; 3	0.9; 2	0.4; 2	0.2; 1	0.4; 3	1.1
SocioMétrica/El Español	9 Apr	?	?	25.9; 104	23.1; 99	19.5; 69	11.7; 30	3.1; 1	3.0; 13	2.9; 3	2.0; 8	1.6; 7	1.2; 5	0.9; 2	0.6; 2	0.6; 1	0.4; 2	0.2; 1	1.3; 3	2.8
CIS	1–9 Apr	3,650	?	30.3	27.2	14.4	10.7	2.0	2.4	2.1	1.2	1.3	1.2	0.9	0.3	0.6	0.2	0.1	0.1	3.1
EM-Analytics/Electomanía	1–8 Apr	1,229	?	24.7; 94	19.7; 72	23.8; 93	12.7; 35	2.9; 1	3.3; 13	2.6; 5	2.4; 9	1.6; 7	1.4; 6	1.0; 2	0.6; 3	0.9; 2	0.4; 2	0.2; 1	0.4; 4	0.9
IMOP/El Confidencial	28 Mar–8 Apr	1,312	?	24.9; 97	25.5; 105	20.6; 77	11.0; 28	1.9; 0	3.0; 13	2.4; 3	1.6; 7	1.6; 7	1.1; 5	0.9; 2	0.3; 1	1.0; 2	0.3; 1	0.2; 1	0.1; 1	0.6
Data10/Okdiario	6–7 Apr	1,000	?	24.5; 96	23.5; 95	21.9; 82	11.0; 28	2.6; 1	3.1; 13	3.3; 4	2.2; 8	1.6; 7	1.3; 5	1.0; 3	0.6; 2	0.8; 2	0.4; 2	0.2; 1	0.1; 1	1.0
Sigma Dos/El Mundo	5–7 Apr	2,400	?	26.3; 106	25.5; 105	17.5; 63	10.6; 25	2.5; 1	3.4; 13	3.5; 7	2.7; 10	1.9; 7	–	–	–	–	–	–	–	0.8
Target Point/El Debate	4–7 Apr	1,001	?	25.0; 99/103	23.7; 95/99	20.6; 73/77	11.9; 29/31	2.3; 0/1	? 13/14	3.3; 3/4	? 6/7	? 6	? 5	? 2/3	? 2	? 2	? 2	? 1	? 2	1.3
Hamalgama Métrica/Vozpópuli	4–7 Apr	?	?	25.9; 99	27.0; 108	18.6; 70	9.8; 26	3.0; 1	3.2; 12	3.0; 5	2.0; 8	1.5; 6	1.1; 5	0.9; 2	0.5; 2	0.7; 2	0.4; 2	0.2; 1	0.1; 1	1.1
Simple Lógica/elDiario.es	1–7 Apr	1,048	65.0	27.2	27.9	17.6	11.4	2.5	–	3.6	–	–	–	–	–	–	–	–	–	0.7
GESOP/Prensa Ibérica	4–6 Apr	1,000	?	26.9; 107/110	28.4; 118/121	16.3; 54/56	11.1; 26/28	2.0; 0	2.8; 12/13	2.2; 1/2	–	–	–	–	–	–	–	–	–	1.5
GAD3/ABC	4–6 Apr	1,000	?	25.3; 96/100	29.4; 124/128	15.4; 51/53	10.7; 26/28	2.4; 1	3.1; 13	2.7; 3	1.8; 8	1.5; 7	1.0; 5	1.0; 3	0.4; 1	0.9; 2	0.4; 2	0.2; 1	0.1; 1	4.1
Metroscopia	4–6 Apr	1,200	?	26.3; 101	29.2; 122	17.6; 58	10.6; 27	1.1; 0	–	2.5; 3	–	–	–	–	–	–	–	–	–	2.9
EM-Analytics/Electomanía	25 Mar–1 Apr	1,431	?	25.3; 99	18.9; 66	24.2; 96	12.6; 33	3.0; 1	3.1; 13	2.7; 5	2.4; 9	1.6; 7	1.4; 6	1.0; 2	0.6; 3	0.9; 2	0.4; 2	0.2; 1	0.4; 4	1.1
Metroscopia	28–30 Mar	1,200	?	26.0	26.0	19.0	11.0	1.0	–	–	–	–	–	–	–	–	–	–	–	Tie
Sigma Dos/Antena 3	29 Mar	?	?	26.7; 106	24.4; 102	18.4; 68	10.3; 25	3.6; 2	3.3; 12	3.4; 7	2.2; 8	1.8; 7	–	–	–	–	–	–	–	2.3
40dB/Prisa	22–28 Mar	2,000	?	25.5; 95/108	23.1; 92/101	19.0; 64/75	12.1; 31/37	3.6; 2	? 13	3.5; 5	? 8	? 6	? 4	? 1	? 2	? 2	? 2	? 1	? 1	2.4
EM-Analytics/Electomanía	18–25 Mar	1,499	?	25.4; 99	18.3; 65	24.5; 97	12.6; 33	3.0; 1	3.2; 13	2.7; 5	2.4; 9	1.6; 7	1.4; 6	1.0; 2	0.6; 3	0.9; 2	0.4; 2	0.2; 1	0.4; 4	0.9
IMOP/El Confidencial	14–25 Mar	1,321	?	25.5; 102	23.6; 97	22.0; 80	10.1; 25	2.0; 0	3.4; 14	2.1; 3	1.6; 7	1.7; 8	0.9; 3	1.1; 3	0.3; 1	1.2; 4	0.3; 1	0.2; 1	0.1; 1	1.9
Metroscopia	21–23 Mar	1,200	?	28.0	24.0	21.0	11.0	1.0	–	–	–	–	–	–	–	–	–	–	–	4.0
DYM/Henneo	16–19 Mar	1,019	?	28.7; 108/114	24.2; 105/109	17.2; 56/60	11.9; 27/30	3.6; 2/3	–	2.4; 2/3	–	–	–	–	–	–	–	–	–	4.5
KeyData/Público	18 Mar	?	68.6	26.7; 109	22.8; 94	19.8; 74	11.0; 28	3.0; 1	3.4; 13	2.8; 3	2.1; 8	1.5; 6	1.1; 5	1.0; 2	0.5; 2	? 1	? 2	? 1	? 1	3.9
EM-Analytics/Electomanía	11–18 Mar	2,203	?	27.0; 107	17.7; 63	23.9; 94	12.4; 32	3.0; 1	3.3; 13	2.6; 5	2.4; 9	1.5; 6	1.4; 6	1.0; 2	0.6; 3	0.9; 2	0.5; 2	0.2; 1	0.3; 3	3.1
Vox	17 Mar	?	?	27.0	21.0	22.0	12.0	–	–	–	–	–	–	–	–	–	–	–	–	5.0
Data10/Okdiario	16–17 Mar	1,000	?	25.8; 100	23.1; 94	21.6; 81	10.7; 28	2.5; 1	3.2; 13	3.0; 3	2.0; 8	1.6; 7	1.2; 5	1.0; 3	0.5; 1	0.8; 2	0.4; 2	0.2; 1	0.1; 1	2.7
Metroscopia	14–16 Mar	1,200	?	29.0	22.0	22.0	11.0	1.0	–	–	–	–	–	–	–	–	–	–	–	7.0
IMOP/El Confidencial	28 Feb–12 Mar	1,303	?	27.5; 113	22.2; 91	20.7; 75	10.0; 24	2.0; 0	3.2; 13	2.3; 3	1.9; 8	1.6; 6	1.3; 5	1.1; 3	0.5; 2	1.2; 4	0.4; 2	0.1; 0	0.1; 1	5.3
InvyMark/laSexta	7–11 Mar	?	?	28.1	24.5	19.5	10.7	1.4	–	2.5	–	–	–	–	–	–	–	–	–	3.6
EM-Analytics/Electomanía	4–11 Mar	1,493	?	27.0; 110	17.4; 61	24.0; 94	12.4; 31	3.0; 1	3.4; 13	2.5; 5	2.4; 10	1.5; 6	1.4; 6	1.0; 2	0.6; 3	0.9; 2	0.4; 2	0.2; 1	0.4; 3	3.0
CIS	1–11 Mar	3,922	?	31.5	23.8	16.3	11.8	3.2	2.7	2.0	1.3	1.3	1.0	1.1	0.4	0.5	0.4	0.2	0.1	7.7
Simple Lógica/elDiario.es	1–10 Mar	1,083	59.7	30.8	23.2	18.8	10.4	2.4	–	2.7	–	–	–	–	–	–	–	–	–	7.6
Metroscopia	7–9 Mar	1,200	?	30.0	22.0	21.0	10.0	2.0	–	–	–	–	–	–	–	–	–	–	–	8.0
Hamalgama Métrica/Vozpópuli	3–9 Mar	1,000	?	26.3; 101	23.5; 98	20.4; 78	10.0; 26	3.1; 1	3.2; 12	3.3; 5	2.2; 8	1.5; 6	1.2; 5	0.9; 2	0.5; 2	0.7; 2	0.4; 2	0.2; 1	0.1; 1	2.8
Celeste-Tel/Onda Cero	2–9 Mar	1,100	63.4	26.8; 107	23.3; 100	19.5; 68	11.1; 27	3.7; 2	3.2; 12	3.5; 5	2.1; 8	1.5; 6	1.1; 5	0.9; 2	0.6; 2	0.8; 2	0.4; 2	0.2; 1	0.1; 1	3.5
Sigma Dos/El Mundo	4–7 Mar	1,965	?	26.0; 104	23.9; 100	19.2; 70	10.4; 25	4.0; 3	3.3; 12	3.2; 7	2.2; 8	1.9; 8	–	–	–	–	–	–	–	2.1
EM-Analytics/Electomanía	1–5 Mar	2,492	?	27.5; 112	17.0; 59	24.0; 95	12.2; 31	3.1; 1	3.4; 13	2.6; 5	2.4; 9	1.5; 6	1.4; 6	1.0; 2	0.6; 3	1.0; 2	0.4; 2	0.2; 1	0.4; 3	3.5
Data10/Okdiario	3–4 Mar	1,000	?	25.3; 98	22.9; 94	21.9; 82	11.1; 29	2.9; 1	3.3; 15	3.2; 3	2.0; 8	1.6; 7	1.2; 5	0.8; 1	0.4; 1	0.7; 2	0.4; 2	0.2; 1	0.1; 1	2.4
NC Report/La Razón	1–4 Mar	1,000	62.3	25.8; 102/104	24.6; 100/102	19.0; 69/71	10.3; 25/27	3.2; 1	3.4; 13	3.3; 6	2.2; 8	1.6; 7	1.2; 5	–	–	–	0.4; 2	–	–	1.2
Sigma Dos/Antena 3	2 Mar	?	?	26.5; 106	23.1; 97	19.8; 72	10.7; 26	3.7; 2	3.2; 12	3.1; 6	2.2; 8	1.8; 8	–	–	–	–	–	–	–	3.4
Metroscopia	28 Feb–2 Mar	1,200	?	31.0	22.0	19.0	9.0	2.0	–	–	–	–	–	–	–	–	–	–	–	9.0
40dB/Prisa	22–28 Feb	2,000	?	26.7; 104/115	21.7; 88/95	19.2; 67/74	11.7; 26/35	4.3; 3	? 12	2.6; 3	? 8	? 6	? 4	? 3	? 2	? 2	? 2	? 1	? 1	5.0
Data10/Okdiario	24–25 Feb	1,000	?	25.7; 103	21.9; 86	21.8; 82	11.3; 31	3.2; 2	3.2; 14	3.3; 3	2.0; 8	1.6; 7	1.1; 5	0.9; 2	0.4; 1	0.7; 2	0.4; 2	0.2; 1	0.1; 1	3.8
Target Point/El Debate	23–25 Feb	1,005	?	26.5; 105/109	20.3; 81/85	20.8; 76/80	13.0; 33/35	3.5; 1/2	? 13/14	3.2; 3/4	? 7/8	? 5/6	? 5/6	? 1/2	? 2	? 2	? 2	? 1	? 2	5.7
Ágora Integral/Canarias Ahora	23–25 Feb	1,000	62.5	27.9; 117	20.6; 83	20.5; 70	10.9; 30	3.6; 2	3.5; 13	2.8; 4	2.3; 8	1.6; 6	1.2; 5	1.0; 2	0.4; 2	0.5; 1	? 2	0.3; 1	0.9; 4	7.3
InvyMark/laSexta	21–25 Feb	?	?	27.9	24.8	19.3	10.4	1.3	–	2.6	–	–	–	–	–	–	–	–	–	3.1
EM-Analytics/Electomanía	20–25 Feb	2,144	?	27.3; 111	16.8; 59	23.9; 95	12.6; 32	3.1; 1	3.5; 13	2.5; 5	2.4; 9	1.5; 6	1.5; 6	1.0; 2	0.6; 3	1.0; 2	0.4; 2	0.2; 1	0.4; 3	3.4
IMOP/El Confidencial	14–25 Feb	1,307	?	27.3; 113	22.4; 95	19.5; 69	11.1; 26	2.8; 1	3.2; 13	2.4; 3	1.9; 8	1.6; 6	1.2; 5	1.1; 3	0.5; 2	1.1; 3	0.3; 1	0.2; 1	0.1; 1	4.9
KeyData/Público	24 Feb	?	66.8	26.4; 108	21.0; 86	21.2; 80	11.9; 31	3.5; 2	3.4; 13	2.8; 2	2.1; 8	1.5; 6	1.1; 5	0.9; 2	0.4; 2	? 1	? 2	? 1	? 1	5.2
Metroscopia	21–23 Feb	1,200	?	30.0	19.0	23.0	11.0	3.0	–	–	–	–	–	–	–	–	–	–	–	7.0
EM-Analytics/Electomanía	19–20 Feb	3,157	?	27.0; 110	17.4; 62	23.4; 92	12.5; 32	3.3; 1	3.6; 13	2.5; 5	2.4; 9	1.4; 6	1.5; 6	1.0; 2	0.7; 3	1.0; 2	0.5; 2	0.2; 1	0.4; 3	3.6
DYM/Henneo	16–20 Feb	1,013	?	28.1; 110/116	21.3; 84/89	19.9; 71/75	12.5; 30/34	3.6; 2/3	–	3.0; 2/3	–	–	–	–	–	–	–	–	–	6.8
Data10/Okdiario	19 Feb	1,000	?	25.4; 104	21.7; 83	22.1; 84	11.3; 31	3.1; 1	3.3; 14	3.3; 3	2.0; 8	1.6; 7	1.1; 5	1.0; 3	0.4; 1	0.7; 2	0.4; 2	0.2; 1	0.1; 1	3.3
SocioMétrica/El Español	18–19 Feb	1,000	?	25.9; 106	20.1; 82	20.9; 78	12.9; 36	3.7; 2	3.0; 13	3.0; 4	2.2; 8	1.5; 6	1.0; 4	0.8; 1	0.6; 3	0.7; 2	0.3; 1	0.2; 1	1.1; 3	5.0
Sigma Dos/El Mundo	18 Feb	?	?	26.4; 108	22.6; 94	20.8; 74	10.1; 24	4.0; 3	3.2; 12	3.5; 7	2.1; 8	1.7; 8	–	–	–	–	–	–	–	3.8
InvyMark/laSexta	14–18 Feb	?	?	25.9	28.9	17.1	10.0	1.2	–	2.6	–	–	–	–	–	–	–	–	–	3.0
EM-Analytics/Electomanía	14–18 Feb	3,372	?	25.7; 99	20.0; 78	21.8; 84	12.9; 34	3.4; 1	3.6; 14	2.5; 5	2.5; 9	1.4; 6	1.4; 6	1.0; 2	0.7; 3	1.0; 2	0.5; 2	0.2; 1	0.3; 3	3.9
GAD3/NIUS	14–17 Feb	1,000	64	31.9; 126/130	22.2; 87/91	18.8; 67/71	8.8; 16/18	3.7; 3	3.1; 13	1.4; 2	2.3; 8	1.7; 8	1.2; 5	0.7; 1	0.5; 2	0.9; 1	0.3; 2	0.2; 1	0.1; 2	9.7
Sigma Dos/El Mundo	14–17 Feb	?	?	25.7; 102	26.8; 113	17.2; 60	10.1; 24	3.0; 1	3.2; 13	3.1; 7	2.2; 8	1.8; 8	–	–	–	–	–	–	–	1.1
Metroscopia	14–16 Feb	1,200	?	29.0	23.0	20.0	11.0	3.0	–	–	–	–	–	–	–	–	–	–	–	6.0
GESOP/Prensa Ibérica	14–16 Feb	1,002	?	26.0; 110/113	20.6; 85/88	18.2; 66/69	12.5; 34/36	3.3; 1/2	3.0; 12/13	3.8; 5/6	–	–	–	–	–	–	–	–	–	5.4
EM-Analytics/Electomanía	13–14 Feb	1,058	?	24.8; 96	21.5; 85	21.4; 83	12.9; 36	3.4; 1	3.5; 13	2.3; 5	2.4; 9	1.4; 6	1.4; 6	1.0; 2	0.7; 2	1.0; 2	0.4; 2	0.2; 1	0.1; 1	3.3
CIS	1–12 Feb	3,860	?	28.6	21.3	14.8	13.6	4.8	2.4	2.5	1.6	1.3	1.1	1.0	0.1	0.6	0.1	0.1	0.1	7.3
Simple Lógica/elDiario.es	1–10 Feb	1,903	63.3	26.7	21.3	19.8	12.3	3.1	–	3.0	–	–	–	–	–	–	–	–	–	5.4
Metroscopia	7–9 Feb	1,200	?	28.0	24.0	19.0	12.0	3.0	–	–	–	–	–	–	–	–	–	–	–	4.0
EM-Analytics/Electomanía	29 Jan–4 Feb	2,208	?	24.6; 95	21.8; 86	21.1; 83	13.0; 37	3.3; 1	3.5; 13	2.4; 5	2.4; 8	1.4; 6	1.4; 6	1.0; 2	0.6; 2	1.0; 2	0.4; 2	0.2; 1	0.1; 1	2.8
40dB/Prisa	27 Jan–1 Feb	2,000	?	27.1; 105/117	23.9; 94/104	17.1; 54/64	12.4; 30/37	3.5; 2	? 13	3.0; 3/4	? 8	? 6	? 4	? 2	? 2	? 2	? 2	? 1	? 1	3.2
NC Report/La Razón	24–28 Jan	1,000	62.5	25.3; 95/97	27.3; 115/117	16.7; 61/63	11.1; 27/29	3.0; 1	3.4; 13	3.1; 6	2.2; 8	1.6; 7	1.1; 5	–	–	–	0.4; 2	–	–	2.0
EM-Analytics/Electomanía	21–28 Jan	1,161	?	24.2; 94	22.5; 92	20.9; 79	13.1; 36	3.3; 1	3.5; 13	2.5; 5	2.4; 8	1.4; 6	1.4; 6	1.0; 2	0.6; 2	0.9; 2	0.5; 2	0.2; 1	0.1; 1	1.7
IMOP/El Confidencial	17–28 Jan	1,325	?	26.2; 104	24.4; 102	17.1; 63	12.2; 32	3.1; 1	3.2; 13	2.7; 3	1.9; 8	1.5; 6	1.4; 6	1.1; 3	0.4; 1	1.1; 4	0.5; 2	0.2; 1	0.1; 1	1.8
DYM/Henneo	19–23 Jan	1,008	?	25.7; 101/106	26.9; 114/119	17.1; 55/59	11.6; 27/30	3.4; 2/3	–	2.8; 2/3	–	–	–	–	–	–	–	–	–	1.2
KeyData/Público	21 Jan	?	68.1	26.0; 106	25.6; 106	17.4; 64	11.5; 29	2.9; 1	3.5; 13	3.0; 4	2.2; 8	1.5; 6	1.1; 5	0.9; 2	0.4; 1	? 1	? 2	? 1	? 1	0.4
EM-Analytics/Electomanía	14–20 Jan	1,190	?	24.4; 94	22.9; 94	20.7; 78	12.7; 33	3.2; 1	3.5; 14	2.5; 5	2.3; 8	1.4; 6	1.4; 6	1.0; 2	0.6; 2	0.9; 2	0.5; 2	0.2; 1	0.1; 1	1.5
Celeste-Tel/Onda Cero	10–14 Jan	1,100	63.5	26.2; 102	27.2; 115	16.5; 59	11.0; 26	3.4; 2	3.0; 12	3.6; 5	2.3; 8	1.5; 6	1.1; 5	0.9; 2	0.6; 2	0.8; 2	0.4; 2	0.2; 1	0.1; 1	1.0
InvyMark/laSexta	10–14 Jan	?	?	27.3	27.9	16.5	10.9	1.3	–	3.0	–	–	–	–	–	–	–	–	–	0.6
CIS (SocioMétrica)	3–14 Jan	3,777	59.3	26.9	22.4	19.0	11.7	3.0	3.1	2.6	1.6	1.3	0.9	0.5	0.4	0.7	0.4	0.0	0.0	4.5
CIS	3–14 Jan	3,777	?	28.5	21.5	14.7	13.1	4.0	3.0	2.8	1.4	1.3	0.9	0.7	0.4	0.6	0.1	0.1	0.1	7.0
IMOP/El Confidencial	3–14 Jan	1,312	?	26.4; 105	24.9; 103	17.9; 66	11.8; 29	2.6; 1	3.4; 14	2.5; 3	1.7; 7	1.5; 6	1.4; 6	1.2; 3	0.5; 2	1.0; 2	0.3; 1	0.2; 1	0.1; 1	1.5
EM-Analytics/Electomanía	7–13 Jan	1,317	?	24.5; 92	23.3; 96	20.5; 77	12.4; 33	3.3; 1	3.5; 14	2.6; 6	2.3; 8	1.4; 6	1.4; 6	1.0; 2	0.6; 2	0.9; 2	0.5; 2	0.2; 1	0.1; 1	1.2
Simple Lógica/elDiario.es	3–13 Jan	1,039	63.0	24.6	24.3	18.7	11.1	2.5	–	2.3	–	–	–	–	–	–	–	–	–	0.3
EM-Analytics/Electomanía	31 Dec–6 Jan	1,823	?	24.9; 95	23.5; 98	20.2; 76	12.0; 30	3.2; 1	3.5; 14	2.6; 5	2.3; 8	1.5; 6	1.3; 6	1.0; 2	0.7; 2	0.9; 2	0.5; 2	0.2; 1	0.1; 1	1.4
Data10/Okdiario	3–5 Jan	1,000	?	25.4; 98	27.8; 117	17.0; 60	10.9; 28	2.7; 1	3.2; 13	3.2; 3	2.0; 8	1.6; 7	1.1; 5	1.0; 3	0.4; 1	0.7; 2	0.4; 2	0.2; 1	0.1; 1	2.4

==== Voting preferences ====
The table below lists raw, unweighted voting preferences.

Color key:

Poll conducted after legal ban on opinion polls

Polling firm/Commissioner	Fieldwork date	Sample size	PSOE	PP	Vox	Unidas Podemos	CS	ERC–Sobiranistes	Más País	JxCat Junts	PNV	EH Bildu	CUP	CC–NCa	BNG	Sumar	Question	X mark	Lead
2023 general election (Note: Does not include non-resident citizens.)	23 Jul 2023	—N/a	22.1	23.0	8.6		–	1.3		1.1	0.8	0.9	0.3	0.3	0.4	8.6	—N/a	29.6	0.9
CIS	13–22 Jul 2023	27,060	28.3	24.8	9.4		–	1.3		1.1	0.8	1.0	0.4	0.2	0.7	14.1	12.1	2.7	3.5
40dB/Prisa	12–16 Jul 2023	2,000	24.9	24.9	12.0		–	1.5		2.1	1.1	0.9	0.5	0.4	0.5	9.7	9.7	7.2	Tie
Simple Lógica/elDiario.es	11–16 Jul 2023	1,600	24.2	22.7	9.0		–	–		–	–	–	–	–	–	14.8	8.3	10.7	1.5
SocioMétrica/El Español	11–16 Jul 2023	1,500	24.5	22.2	9.8		–	–		–	–	–	–	–	–	16.2	9.0	5.7	2.3
GESOP/Prensa Ibérica	13–15 Jul 2023	1,200	22.6	19.8	9.2		–	1.4		1.0	–	–	–	–	–	11.2	20.0	10.5	2.8
40dB/Prisa	11–15 Jul 2023	2,000	24.2	25.3	11.5		–	1.4		2.1	1.2	1.1	0.6	0.5	0.6	9.8	10.4	6.9	1.1
40dB/Prisa	10–14 Jul 2023	2,000	24.8	24.9	11.3		–	1.3		2.0	1.3	0.9	0.3	0.5	0.6	10.7	10.3	6.0	0.1
Simple Lógica/elDiario.es	6–14 Jul 2023	1,300	22.1	24.8	8.8		–	–		–	–	–	–	–	–	16.0	8.3	10.7	2.7
DYM/Henneo	12–13 Jul 2023	1,021	26.0	32.1	8.5		–	–		–	–	–	–	–	–	8.8	12.5	0.7	6.1
40dB/Prisa	9–13 Jul 2023	2,000	25.5	24.0	12.5		–	1.3		2.0	1.1	0.9	0.3	0.5	0.7	9.9	10.0	6.2	1.5
Simple Lógica/elDiario.es	5–13 Jul 2023	1,300	24.2	23.7	9.2		–	–		–	–	–	–	–	–	15.0	8.2	11.3	0.5
CIS	10–12 Jul 2023	8,798	26.5	24.9	8.7		–	1.6		1.0	0.9	0.8	0.4	0.1	0.8	11.8	17.7	2.3	1.6
SocioMétrica/El Español	9–12 Jul 2023	800	24.2	22.9	8.6		–	–		–	–	–	–	–	–	15.8	11.4	6.3	1.3
40dB/Prisa	8–12 Jul 2023	2,000	25.4	22.7	12.7		–	1.4		2.0	1.0	0.7	0.4	0.4	0.7	9.9	10.5	7.0	2.7
Simple Lógica/elDiario.es	4–12 Jul 2023	1,300	23.2	22.1	7.4		–	–		–	–	–	–	–	–	12.5	13.4	14.2	1.1
40dB/Prisa	7–11 Jul 2023	2,000	25.9	21.9	12.5		–	1.7		1.7	0.9	0.7	0.4	0.3	0.6	10.8	10.3	7.1	4.0
Simple Lógica/elDiario.es	3–11 Jul 2023	1,300	22.4	21.2	6.6		–	–		–	–	–	–	–	–	12.8	14.9	14.9	1.2
DYM/Henneo	7–10 Jul 2023	1,021	24.5	28.5	8.7		–	–		–	–	–	–	–	–	8.3	–	–	4.0
40dB/Prisa	6–10 Jul 2023	2,000	25.5	22.0	12.6		–	1.9		1.6	0.8	0.7	0.6	0.2	0.7	10.4	10.9	6.8	3.5
Simple Lógica/elDiario.es	3–10 Jul 2023	997	20.6	19.8	6.8		–	–		–	–	–	–	–	–	12.6	16.6	16.5	0.8
40dB/Prisa	4–9 Jul 2023	2,500	25.5	21.7	12.0		–	1.7		1.6	0.9	0.8	0.6	0.2	0.8	10.9	11.5	6.6	3.8
SocioMétrica/El Español	2–9 Jul 2023	800	24.2	22.9	8.6		–	–		–	–	–	–	–	–	15.8	11.4	6.3	1.3
40dB/Prisa	4–8 Jul 2023	2,000	25.8	22.2	11.8		–	1.6		1.5	0.9	1.0	0.6	0.1	0.8	11.1	11.3	6.1	3.6
40dB/Prisa	4–7 Jul 2023	1,500	25.9	21.8	12.4		–	1.3		1.8	0.9	0.9	0.7	0.1	1.0	10.7	11.5	5.8	4.1
40dB/Prisa	4–5 Jul 2023	1,000	26.3	20.6	12.3		–	0.9		1.8	0.9	0.9	0.6	0.1	0.8	11.1	11.8	6.5	5.7
CIS	30 Jun–5 Jul 2023	4,166	23.3	22.8	8.1		–	1.1		0.6	0.9	0.9	0.4	0.1	0.7	11.8	18.3	6.0	0.5
DYM/Henneo	30 Jun–3 Jul 2023	1,018	23.6	30.4	7.2		–	–		–	–	–	–	–	–	7.7	14.5	5.6	6.8
SocioMétrica/El Español	25 Jun–2 Jul 2023	800	23.9	25.2	8.9		–	–		–	–	–	–	–	–	12.3	11.8	7.4	1.3
CIS	8–27 Jun 2023	29,201	24.6	25.4	8.8		–	1.3		1.0	0.8	1.0	0.5	0.3	0.8	12.7	16.9	2.3	0.8
40dB/Prisa	23–26 Jun 2023	2,000	23.1	22.1	12.9		–	1.3		1.9	0.9	0.8	0.6	0.4	0.7	10.1	13.6	6.5	1.0
DYM/Henneo	16–26 Jun 2023	1,522	24.2	28.8	6.9		–	–		–	–	–	–	–	–	6.9	16.5	5.7	4.6
SocioMétrica/El Español	18–25 Jun 2023	800	20.4	22.6	10.9		–	–		–	–	–	–	–	–	11.8	13.7	6.8	2.2
DYM/Henneo	16–19 Jun 2023	1,015	24.4	27.2	6.6		–	–		–	–	–	–	–	–	6.6	16.7	6.4	2.8
SocioMétrica/El Español	10–17 Jun 2023	800	19.8	23.3	10.8		–	–		–	–	–	–	–	–	10.4	12.1	6.0	3.5
40dB/Prisa	12–14 Jun 2023	2,000	21.2	23.6	12.0		–	1.3		2.2	1.1	0.6	0.6	0.3	0.9	10.9	12.6	6.6	2.4
SocioMétrica/El Español	8–10 Jun 2023	1,010	20.5	23.2	10.2		–	–		–	–	–	–	–	–	8.9	12.3	5.8	2.7
Simple Lógica/elDiario.es	1–8 Jun 2023	1,027	20.6	21.6	8.9		–	–		–	–	–	–	–	–	10.8	13.5	17.0	1.0
CIS	31 May–7 Jun 2023	7,407	21.5	21.6	6.6		0.2	0.8		0.8	0.8	0.7	0.2	0.2	0.4	8.3	30.2	3.9	0.1
SocioMétrica/El Español	30 May–3 Jun 2023	1,140	19.2	21.4	10.2	3.9	–	–		–	–	–	–	–	–	4.2	11.5	10.2	2.2
40dB/Prisa	31 May–1 Jun 2023	800	22.5	25.6	12.0		–	1.4		1.5	0.7	0.4	0.3	0.5	1.2	12.5	12.4	3.9	3.1
40dB/Prisa	31 May–1 Jun 2023	800	21.7	24.2	12.1	3.8	–	1.3		1.6	0.9	0.2	0.4	0.3	1.2	7.3	12.7	5.8	2.5
GESOP/Prensa Ibérica	30 May–1 Jun 2023	1,003	24.7	23.6	7.4	1.2	–	1.3		1.4	–	–	–	–	–	8.5	18.9	9.0	1.1
Simple Lógica/elDiario.es	3–11 May 2023	1,013	17.4	18.0	7.2	4.9	1.2	–		–	–	–	–	–	–	7.3	19.1	19.2	0.6
CIS	3–8 May 2023	4,030	21.1	20.7	7.9	4.3	0.9	1.6		0.7	0.6	0.7	0.4	0.3	0.7	9.6	15.8	6.9	0.4
SocioMétrica/El Español	2–5 May 2023	900	21.7	20.8	13.1	7.2	3.1	–		–	–	–	–	–	–	5.2	7.2	10.3	0.9
40dB/Prisa	21–25 Apr 2023	2,000	20.4	21.8	11.7		2.7	1.5		1.9	0.7	0.7	0.4	0.5	0.6	14.4	10.9	4.4	1.4
40dB/Prisa	21–25 Apr 2023	2,000	19.1	20.2	11.3	5.2	2.6	1.6		1.9	0.6	0.5	0.4	0.3	0.5	8.0	13.1	5.5	1.1
DYM/Henneo	19–21 Apr 2023	1,008	20.5	20.9	7.2	4.3	3.7	–		–	–	–	–	–	–	6.0	16.1	5.4	0.4
Simple Lógica/elDiario.es	3–12 Apr 2023	1,014	17.6	15.4	7.0	4.7	1.3	–		–	–	–	–	–	–	6.5	18.6	22.7	2.2
SocioMétrica/El Español	4–8 Apr 2023	900	22.0	19.5	9.6	8.8	2.5	–		–	–	–	–	–	–	5.0	10.1	10.6	2.5
CIS	31 Mar–5 Apr 2023	4,159	22.2	19.9	8.4	5.1	1.2	1.5		0.6	0.9	0.7	0.3	0.2	0.4	8.4	14.0	7.2	2.3
40dB/Prisa	24–27 Mar 2023	2,000	21.1	18.3	11.7	8.5	2.7	1.5	2.1	1.7	0.7	0.6	0.5	0.2	0.4	–	15.9	6.1	2.8
DYM/Henneo	23–24 Mar 2023	1,008	20.0	22.1	9.5	5.5	3.3	–	–	–	–	–	–	–	–	–	17.7	6.9	2.1
CIS	1–11 Mar 2023	3,788	23.6	20.9	6.6	7.0	1.7	1.4	1.0	0.7	0.8	0.4	0.3	0.3	0.6	2.4	18.0	7.0	2.7
Simple Lógica/elDiario.es	1–7 Mar 2023	1,028	17.9	16.2	9.1	7.7	1.5	–	1.0	–	–	–	–	–	–	–	18.6	20.4	1.7
SocioMétrica/El Español	28 Feb–3 Mar 2023	900	16.8	20.4	10.8	7.7	1.7	–	2.2	–	–	–	–	–	–	–	10.7	20.0	3.6
GESOP/Prensa Ibérica	27 Feb–1 Mar 2023	1,002	18.7	22.1	8.4	7.9	2.0	1.7	1.0	1.2	0.8	0.8	0.4	0.1	0.7	–	15.0	9.8	3.4
40dB/Prisa	23–26 Feb 2023	2,000	20.4	18.8	10.1	8.7	2.5	2.0	1.7	1.6	0.9	0.7	0.5	0.1	0.7	–	16.0	6.7	1.6
DYM/Henneo	15–19 Feb 2023	1,003	22.6	25.6	8.5	5.8	3.5	–	–	–	–	–	–	–	–	–	15.5	5.6	3.0
CIS	1–11 Feb 2023	3,935	22.1	22.7	6.0	9.6	1.1	1.2	1.1	0.5	0.6	0.8	0.2	0.2	0.5	–	18.1	7.3	0.6
Simple Lógica/elDiario.es	1–7 Feb 2023	1,240	21.2	16.5	6.5	7.2	0.7	–	1.0	–	–	–	–	–	–	–	18.2	22.4	4.7
SocioMétrica/El Español	30 Jan–3 Feb 2023	900	17.4	18.4	10.3	7.6	1.5	–	2.6	–	–	–	–	–	–	–	11.6	19.8	1.0
40dB/Prisa	26–29 Jan 2023	2,000	21.2	20.0	11.7	7.7	2.6	1.5	1.7	1.9	0.5	0.5	0.3	0.1	0.5	–	15.6	6.5	1.2
DYM/Henneo	18–20 Jan 2023	1,007	20.1	23.8	9.5	4.7	4.4	–	–	–	–	–	–	–	–	–	15.5	5.6	3.7
CIS	2–12 Jan 2023	3,961	22.5	23.0	6.8	9.9	1.4	1.5	1.2	0.9	0.7	0.6	0.3	0.2	0.6	–	15.5	7.2	0.5
Simple Lógica/elDiario.es	2–10 Jan 2023	1,012	17.4	17.9	6.6	7.4	1.3	–	2.3	–	–	–	–	–	–	–	19.5	21.2	0.5
SocioMétrica/El Español	28–31 Dec 2022	1,200	18.2	20.4	9.4	7.8	1.9	–	2.7	–	–	–	–	–	–	–	11.9	16.1	2.2
40dB/Prisa	27–31 Dec 2022	2,000	20.5	19.0	11.0	7.6	2.2	1.9	1.9	2.1	1.0	0.7	0.5	0.2	0.7	–	17.2	5.7	1.5
DYM/Henneo	14–17 Dec 2022	1,014	22.4	25.1	7.8	3.9	2.6	–	1.4	–	–	–	–	–	–	–	17.2	7.3	2.7
CIS	1–14 Dec 2022	3,871	22.1	21.9	7.6	9.5	1.2	1.4	1.0	0.7	0.8	0.4	0.3	0.2	0.4	–	16.5	7.3	0.2
Simple Lógica/elDiario.es	1–13 Dec 2022	1,029	16.6	17.0	11.6	5.2	0.2	–	1.5	–	–	–	–	–	–	–	8.7	31.2	0.4
40dB/Prisa	23–26 Nov 2022	2,000	20.3	19.2	10.9	6.0	3.6	1.9	1.4	1.4	0.8	0.6	0.5	0.3	0.6	8.0	14.0	4.9	1.1
40dB/Prisa	23–26 Nov 2022	2,000	19.5	18.9	11.5		3.6	1.7		1.3	0.8	0.6	0.6	0.2	0.6	14.9	15.1	6.2	0.6
40dB/Prisa	23–26 Nov 2022	2,000	21.3	19.0	10.6	7.6	3.2	1.7	2.1	1.2	0.7	0.6	0.6	0.2	0.8	–	16.5	6.0	2.3
GESOP/Prensa Ibérica	21–24 Nov 2022	1,001	20.9	22.1	6.8	8.1	1.3	1.8	1.8	0.6	0.6	0.5	0.2	0.7	0.4	–	18.2	8.0	1.2
DYM/Henneo	16–22 Nov 2022	1,003	22.5	22.8	10.5	4.5	3.1	–	1.7	–	–	–	–	–	–	–	13.6	7.4	0.3
CIS	2–12 Nov 2022	3,821	22.4	20.8	7.1	9.1	1.2	1.5	0.9	0.7	1.0	0.6	0.3	0.3	0.5	–	18.1	7.3	1.6
Simple Lógica/elDiario.es	2–11 Nov 2022	996	18.1	16.6	5.9	7.8	1.1	–	1.1	–	–	–	–	–	–	–	22.0	20.6	1.5
SocioMétrica/El Español	31 Oct–2 Nov 2022	1,200	16.6	19.2	11.1	6.4	2.5	–	2.9	–	–	–	–	–	–	–	11.4	20.9	2.6
40dB/Prisa	27–30 Oct 2022	2,000	20.3	19.7	10.6	7.9	2.7	1.7	2.1	1.8	0.9	0.7	0.3	0.3	0.8	–	15.7	5.8	0.6
CIS	11–26 Oct 2022	5,557	22.9	22.6	6.8	8.4	1.0	1.9	1.1	1.0	0.7	0.6	0.4	0.1	0.8	–	20.7	5.9	0.3
DYM/Henneo	19–23 Oct 2022	1,006	24.0	24.1	8.5	4.5	2.7	–	1.0	–	–	–	–	–	–	–	17.1	6.8	0.1
Simple Lógica/elDiario.es	3–14 Oct 2022	1,048	18.1	16.4	4.8	5.5	1.1	–	1.5	–	–	–	–	–	–	–	23.3	22.5	1.7
CIS	1–10 Oct 2022	3,713	23.8	22.1	6.2	9.5	1.5	1.3	0.8	0.9	0.8	0.5	0.3	0.3	0.5	–	17.1	7.1	1.7
SocioMétrica/El Español	26–30 Sep 2022	1,200	13.7	19.5	11.8	6.8	2.3	–	2.5	–	–	–	–	–	–	–	12.9	19.3	5.8
40dB/Prisa	22–26 Sep 2022	2,000	19.3	19.5	10.5	7.8	2.8	1.8	1.7	1.5	0.8	1.0	0.6	0.1	0.7	–	17.0	6.8	0.2
DYM/Henneo	14–18 Sep 2022	1,007	23.0	22.7	8.9	5.9	3.9	–	2.0	–	–	–	–	–	–	–	16.9	5.1	0.3
CIS	1–10 Sep 2022	3,837	20.9	22.0	6.6	9.3	1.2	1.5	1.1	0.7	0.7	0.3	0.5	0.1	0.6	–	18.9	7.7	1.1
Simple Lógica/elDiario.es	1–9 Sep 2022	1,044	15.8	18.4	7.8	5.0	1.6	–	1.1	–	–	–	–	–	–	–	22.6	20.9	2.6
SocioMétrica/El Español	29 Aug–3 Sep 2022	1,200	14.8	18.9	12.3	6.7	2.4	–	2.4	–	–	–	–	–	–	–	11.4	19.4	4.1
40dB/Prisa	23–28 Aug 2022	2,000	20.5	18.2	11.9	7.9	2.7	1.6	1.8	1.9	0.8	1.0	0.4	0.3	0.6	–	17.2	5.4	2.3
Simple Lógica/elDiario.es	1–8 Aug 2022	1,078	15.3	18.0	5.9	5.6	1.0	–	1.9	–	–	–	–	–	–	–	23.5	22.3	2.7
DYM/Henneo	14–17 Jul 2022	1,000	20.5	26.9	8.6	5.0	3.2	–	1.6	–	–	–	–	–	–	–	13.5	7.8	6.4
SocioMétrica/El Español	14–16 Jul 2022	1,919	15.4	17.0	12.0	7.4	2.2	–	2.4	–	–	–	–	–	–	–	12.3	19.1	1.6
CIS	1–12 Jul 2022	3,988	21.1	24.9	5.9	9.4	1.1	1.9	1.2	0.5	1.0	0.6	0.4	0.1	0.6	–	13.1	8.6	3.8
Simple Lógica/elDiario.es	1–11 Jul 2022	1,044	15.7	21.4	5.8	7.3	1.1	–	1.2	–	–	–	–	–	–	–	20.0	22.4	5.7
SW Demoscopia	29 Jun–1 Jul 2022	1,002	19.7	19.5	10.4	7.1	1.4	2.2	1.8	1.1	1.1	0.6	0.5	0.3	0.3	–	10.8	16.1	0.2
40dB/Prisa	23–27 Jun 2022	2,000	18.4	21.5	10.9	8.6	2.7	1.9	2.1	1.6	1.0	0.5	0.2	0.2	0.8	–	15.9	5.3	3.1
GESOP/Prensa Ibérica	20–22 Jun 2022	1,001	18.6	25.5	6.1	7.8	1.7	2.3	2.4	0.9	1.0	1.1	1.0	0.3	0.3	–	14.6	8.3	6.9
Simple Lógica/elDiario.es	1–9 Jun 2022	1,055	15.7	16.9	8.1	6.3	1.3	–	0.5	–	–	–	–	–	–	–	22.1	23.0	1.2
CIS	1–9 Jun 2022	3,623	21.5	21.4	8.0	8.4	1.4	1.5	1.0	0.7	0.9	0.6	0.2	0.2	0.6	–	14.2	9.3	0.1
40dB/Prisa	18–23 May 2022	2,000	22.2	17.2	11.3	8.2	3.5	1.4	2.3	1.8	1.1	0.5	0.5	0.3	0.8	–	15.6	6.3	5.0
CEMOP	25 Apr–18 May 2022	1,236	16.9	17.6	10.4	8.1	0.7	1.3	1.0	0.9	0.6	0.6	0.6	0.2	0.3	–	17.1	9.0	0.7
DYM/Henneo	11–13 May 2022	1,011	20.9	21.1	8.5	5.8	4.5	–	1.8	–	–	–	–	–	–	–	16.4	6.5	0.2
CIS	3–12 May 2022	3,865	20.8	20.8	7.7	7.8	1.1	1.8	1.1	0.6	1.0	0.4	0.3	0.1	0.5	–	15.2	10.8	Tie
Simple Lógica/elDiario.es	3–11 May 2022	1,049	17.3	17.5	6.3	6.7	1.5	–	1.5	–	–	–	–	–	–	–	20.9	22.3	0.2
40dB/Prisa	20–25 Apr 2022	2,000	20.5	17.4	13.0	7.6	3.4	1.6	2.6	2.0	0.8	0.3	0.5	0.2	0.7	–	16.8	4.8	3.1
DYM/Henneo	20–22 Apr 2022	1,012	22.9	21.8	8.0	5.1	4.5	–	2.3	–	–	–	–	–	–	–	15.2	5.5	1.1
CIS	1–9 Apr 2022	3,650	22.2	20.6	7.7	8.4	1.2	1.5	1.1	0.7	0.9	0.3	0.4	0.1	0.5	–	17.0	8.2	1.6
Simple Lógica/elDiario.es	1–7 Apr 2022	1,048	16.8	15.8	7.6	5.6	1.5	–	1.6	–	–	–	–	–	–	–	22.7	23.5	1.0
GESOP/Prensa Ibérica	4–6 Apr 2022	1,000	19.6	20.7	8.8	7.4	1.7	1.6	1.2	0.8	0.3	1.0	0.2	0.1	0.5	–	17.2	10.2	1.1
40dB/Prisa	22–28 Mar 2022	2,000	20.0	16.1	13.1	8.5	3.3	2.1	2.6	1.5	0.9	0.2	0.3	0.4	0.9	–	18.2	4.8	3.9
DYM/Henneo	16–19 Mar 2022	1,019	22.5	19.5	9.5	6.5	4.5	–	1.2	–	–	–	–	–	–	–	–	–	3.0
CIS	1–11 Mar 2022	3,922	22.9	18.1	8.0	9.9	2.0	1.8	0.9	0.7	1.0	0.7	0.6	0.2	0.5	–	15.2	8.5	4.8
Simple Lógica/elDiario.es	1–10 Mar 2022	1,083	19.8	12.1	6.4	6.3	1.5	–	1.2	–	–	–	–	–	–	–	21.7	25.5	7.7
40dB/Prisa	22–28 Feb 2022	2,000	20.6	14.4	14.4	9.0	4.5	1.9	2.3	1.8	1.1	0.5	0.6	0.3	0.8	–	15.9	4.7	6.2
DYM/Henneo	16–20 Feb 2022	1,013	20.4	16.3	10.9	7.3	4.0	–	2.1	–	–	–	–	–	–	–	17.1	8.5	4.1
GESOP/Prensa Ibérica	14–16 Feb 2022	1,002	17.7	11.4	7.2	8.8	2.0	1.7	2.5	0.7	0.9	0.7	0.7	0.2	0.8	–	29.8	6.0	6.3
CIS	1–12 Feb 2022	3,860	21.0	13.3	8.0	10.3	2.9	1.6	1.4	0.9	0.9	0.6	0.5	0.1	0.5	–	19.5	9.4	7.7
Simple Lógica/elDiario.es	1–10 Feb 2022	1,903	16.5	10.6	7.3	8.3	2.2	–	1.8	–	–	–	–	–	–	–	23.1	23.0	5.9
40dB/Prisa	27 Jan–1 Feb 2022	2,000	21.5	15.5	13.0	9.0	3.4	2.0	1.9	1.8	0.9	0.4	0.4	0.3	0.5	–	16.9	4.7	6.0
DYM/Henneo	19–23 Jan 2022	1,008	19.5	19.4	9.9	5.9	3.9	–	2.1	–	–	–	–	–	–	–	–	–	0.1
CIS	3–14 Jan 2022	3,777	19.8	13.8	8.3	8.7	2.2	1.8	1.5	0.7	0.8	0.5	0.1	0.3	0.5	–	20.0	10.4	6.0
Simple Lógica/elDiario.es	3–13 Jan 2022	1,039	14.1	12.5	7.7	7.6	1.5	–	0.9	–	–	–	–	–	–	–	23.7	23.9	1.6
40dB/Prisa	23–30 Dec 2021	2,000	17.7	12.3	11.3	8.2	4.2	2.1	3.2	1.8	1.2	0.8	–	0.5	0.9	–	20.8	6.3	5.4
DYM/Henneo	15–19 Dec 2021	1,012	20.0	19.1	8.5	6.6	5.7	–	2.4	–	–	–	–	–	–	–	16.9	8.4	0.9
CIS	1–13 Dec 2021	3,733	21.8	14.7	8.4	10.7	3.6	1.8	1.6	0.9	0.8	0.4	0.4	0.1	0.6	–	15.9	9.9	7.1
Simple Lógica	1–13 Dec 2021	1,041	16.8	13.3	8.0	6.6	2.3	–	1.8	–	–	–	–	–	–	–	22.6	20.4	3.5
DYM/Henneo	17–21 Nov 2021	1,021	20.4	19.1	10.1	6.2	5.8	–	1.6	–	–	–	–	–	–	–	15.4	6.9	1.3
Simple Lógica	30 Oct–15 Nov 2021	1,026	14.4	11.9	7.6	5.5	1.5	–	1.7	–	–	–	–	–	–	–	22.9	25.2	2.5
CIS	2–11 Nov 2021	3,779	19.7	14.1	8.5	10.6	3.0	1.6	2.2	0.8	1.0	0.3	0.4	0.3	0.5	–	18.7	9.3	5.6
DYM/Henneo	20–24 Oct 2021	1,000	19.5	20.4	8.8	6.3	4.3	–	1.0	–	–	–	–	–	–	–	16.9	8.8	0.9
Simple Lógica	30 Sep–15 Oct 2021	1,056	15.1	14.0	7.6	6.7	2.1	–	1.2	–	–	–	–	–	–	–	21.2	23.7	1.1
CIS	1–13 Oct 2021	3,660	19.3	15.0	7.7	8.2	3.2	1.8	1.9	0.9	0.9	0.4	0.4	0.2	0.4	–	21.8	9.5	4.3
DYM/Henneo	16–19 Sep 2021	1,000	21.5	18.9	9.1	6.7	5.4	–	1.6	–	–	–	–	–	–	–	17.2	7.7	2.6
Simple Lógica	1–16 Sep 2021	1,027	16.4	12.5	6.7	7.0	1.7	–	2.6	–	–	–	–	–	–	–	21.5	24.0	3.9
CIS	1–13 Sep 2021	3,780	20.5	12.8	7.6	8.2	3.2	1.9	2.4	0.9	0.8	0.6	0.3	0.1	0.3	–	20.6	10.6	7.7
Simple Lógica	2–4 Aug 2021	1,062	18.1	14.2	6.6	6.0	2.4	–	2.4	–	–	–	–	–	–	–	20.2	24.1	3.9
CIS	21–29 Jul 2021	2,849	16.9	12.9	5.6	7.7	2.1	2.1	1.9	0.8	0.6	0.8	0.3	0.0	0.6	–	29.2	11.4	4.0
DYM/Henneo	15–19 Jul 2021	1,019	18.3	21.3	9.8	6.2	5.3	–	1.3	–	–	–	–	–	–	–	18.2	7.5	3.0
GESOP/El Periódico	14–15 Jul 2021	802	20.1	14.3	5.4	6.9	2.6	2.6	2.0	0.7	1.2	0.6	0.2	–	0.1	–	23.2	11.8	5.8
CIS	2–15 Jul 2021	3,798	19.5	14.8	6.5	7.4	2.2	2.2	2.5	1.2	0.7	0.4	0.3	0.2	0.8	–	22.3	11.4	4.7
Simple Lógica	5–12 Jul 2021	1,076	15.3	14.8	6.8	6.8	1.7	–	2.1	–	–	–	–	–	–	–	19.6	24.4	0.5
DYM/Henneo	17–21 Jun 2021	1,002	20.2	19.5	10.3	5.8	5.5	–	–	–	–	–	–	–	–	–	–	–	0.7
CIS	2–15 Jun 2021	3,814	17.3	17.0	6.8	8.7	3.2	2.3	2.9	0.9	0.9	0.7	0.3	0.1	0.5	–	20.2	10.5	0.3
Simple Lógica	1–9 Jun 2021	1,017	13.7	15.6	7.7	7.0	2.4	–	3.8	–	–	–	–	–	–	–	19.1	23.1	1.9
DYM/Henneo	21–24 May 2021	1,008	19.5	22.9	9.0	6.0	4.1	–	3.9	–	–	–	–	–	–	–	15.1	7.4	3.4
CIS	4–13 May 2021	3,814	19.7	16.0	6.2	7.4	3.0	1.9	2.7	0.9	0.4	0.7	0.2	0.1	0.4	–	22.1	9.2	3.7
Simple Lógica	4–12 May 2021	1,063	15.2	15.2	6.8	5.9	2.7	–	–	–	–	–	–	–	–	–	20.3	22.2	Tie
CIS	5–14 Apr 2021	3,823	22.2	12.3	9.0	7.3	3.3	1.6	1.2	0.6	0.9	0.4	0.2	0.1	0.4	–	21.8	10.9	9.9
Simple Lógica	5–13 Apr 2021	1,053	17.5	11.9	7.7	7.2	2.7	–	–	–	–	–	–	–	–	–	18.0	26.3	5.6
CIS	1–11 Mar 2021	3,820	21.0	10.0	8.8	7.1	5.5	2.1	1.3	0.9	1.1	0.6	0.5	0.1	0.6	–	20.8	10.9	11.0
Simple Lógica	1–9 Mar 2021	1,023	16.2	7.9	7.3	7.8	5.1	–	–	–	–	–	–	–	–	–	18.5	26.2	8.3
DYM/Henneo	19–23 Feb 2021	1,002	24.1	13.0	10.6	6.5	7.3	–	–	–	–	–	–	–	–	–	16.8	6.4	11.1
CIS	3–11 Feb 2021	3,869	21.6	11.5	7.3	7.7	6.5	2.2	1.1	0.6	0.9	0.3	0.4	0.1	0.6	–	19.7	11.8	10.1
Simple Lógica	1–5 Feb 2021	1,054	18.4	7.5	7.2	6.5	5.5	–	–	–	–	–	–	–	–	–	20.0	27.8	10.9
CIS	7–25 Jan 2021	3,862	21.0	12.7	6.5	7.1	5.9	1.5	0.8	0.7	1.1	0.3	0.2	0.3	0.5	–	21.0	12.3	8.3
Simple Lógica	4–13 Jan 2021	1,045	17.7	11.2	5.9	7.7	6.1	–	–	–	–	–	–	–	–	–	19.7	22.3	6.5
DYM/Henneo	15–17 Dec 2020	1,000	20.4	17.5	9.7	6.5	10.1	–	–	–	–	–	–	–	–	–	14.0	8.7	2.9
CIS	1–9 Dec 2020	3,817	19.4	11.8	7.0	7.1	7.5	1.6	1.6	0.9	0.9	0.9	0.4	0.2	0.5	–	20.8	11.5	7.6
Simple Lógica	30 Nov–9 Dec 2020	1,065	18.3	9.7	5.8	7.4	5.7	–	–	–	–	–	–	–	–	–	19.9	24.1	8.6
SW Demoscopia/infoLibre	26 Nov–5 Dec 2020	1,237	24.3	15.3	8.3	5.7	6.6	–	–	–	–	–	–	–	–	–	7.9	11.6	9.0
DYM/Henneo	18–20 Nov 2020	1,001	21.1	17.6	10.5	6.5	10.5	–	–	–	–	–	–	–	–	–	15.2	4.8	3.5
CIS	3–12 Nov 2020	3,853	19.8	9.6	7.5	8.3	6.1	2.1	1.2	0.9	0.9	0.4	0.3	0.2	0.6	–	20.7	12.7	10.2
Simple Lógica	4–11 Nov 2020	1,036	19.6	8.9	5.4	7.9	3.3	–	–	–	–	–	–	–	–	–	20.5	25.9	10.7
DYM/Henneo	22–23 Oct 2020	1,006	19.1	16.6	9.8	7.1	10.3	–	–	–	–	–	–	–	–	–	15.1	7.3	2.5
Simple Lógica	1–9 Oct 2020	1,060	16.5	9.9	6.1	7.5	5.4	–	–	–	–	–	–	–	–	–	22.1	24.7	6.6
CIS	1–7 Oct 2020	2,924	20.8	11.3	6.7	8.0	5.3	1.7	1.1	0.9	0.9	0.6	0.2	0.1	0.4	–	20.6	12.3	9.5
SW Demoscopia	Oct 2020	?	23.4	13.7	6.0	6.7	7.7	–	–	–	–	–	–	–	–	–	12.3	12.7	9.7
DYM/Henneo	16–20 Sep 2020	1,008	21.1	14.4	9.2	8.4	10.7	–	0.5	–	–	–	–	–	–	–	15.9	5.7	6.7
Simple Lógica	1–11 Sep 2020	1,065	18.7	10.9	6.3	6.9	3.9	–	–	–	–	–	–	–	–	–	21.9	22.8	7.8
CIS	1–7 Sep 2020	2,904	22.0	10.5	6.8	8.2	7.0	1.6	1.0	0.8	0.6	0.5	0.4	0.3	0.6	–	20.0	11.4	11.5
SW Demoscopia	Sep 2020	?	25.0	13.0	6.4	6.4	7.6	–	–	–	–	–	–	–	–	–	9.7	11.1	12.0
SW Demoscopia	19–21 Aug 2020	1,001	30.8	13.6	6.1	8.2	6.4	–	–	–	–	–	–	–	–	–	16.8	6.9	17.2
Simple Lógica	3–6 Aug 2020	1,046	21.5	11.0	5.2	7.3	3.9	–	–	–	–	–	–	–	–	–	19.6	22.5	10.5
CIS	9–19 Jul 2020	2,926	25.4	11.9	5.8	10.0	6.0	1.5	1.1	0.6	0.5	0.8	0.2	0.2	0.7	–	22.5	6.9	13.5
IMOP/CIS	1–9 Jul 2020	3,032	25.3	13.0	5.3	9.0	6.4	2.0	0.6	0.7	0.8	0.6	0.3	0.2	0.4	–	15.3	12.7	12.3
Simple Lógica	1–8 Jul 2020	1,035	20.2	10.5	5.4	7.3	4.8	–	–	–	–	–	–	–	–	–	18.8	24.7	9.7
DYM/Henneo	24–27 Jun 2020	1,000	23.2	17.6	7.0	6.8	9.6	–	0.7	–	–	–	–	–	–	–	14.1	7.4	5.6
GESOP	22–26 Jun 2020	750	17.1	9.7	4.2	8.8	3.7	1.1	–	0.8	–	–	–	–	–	–	36.9		7.4
IMOP/CIS	1–9 Jun 2020	4,258	24.3	12.5	5.3	8.7	7.2	1.9	0.7	0.7	1.0	0.5	0.4	0.2	0.6	–	16.0	11.3	11.8
Simple Lógica	1–5 Jun 2020	1,012	19.2	10.5	6.5	7.0	4.5	–	–	–	–	–	–	–	–	–	16.5	27.7	8.7
GESOP/El Periódico	11–15 May 2020	750	17.4	10.4	4.5	6.7	3.5	2.7	–	1.2	0.8	0.7	–	–	–	–	42.2		7.0
Intercampo/CIS	4–13 May 2020	3,800	25.2	13.8	5.6	9.3	8.1	2.1	1.1	0.7	1.1	0.5	0.3	0.3	0.4	–	12.0	10.7	11.4
SW Demoscopia	5–8 May 2020	1,104	24.5	13.0	5.4	7.1	5.8	–	–	–	–	–	–	–	–	–	22.4	8.3	11.5
Simple Lógica	4–8 May 2020	1,019	19.0	9.8	4.9	8.4	5.8	–	–	–	–	–	–	–	–	–	21.7	23.2	9.2
DYM/Henneo	23–25 Apr 2020	1,000	20.4	15.4	8.6	6.9	7.9	–	–	–	–	–	–	–	–	–	16.2	8.8	5.0
Simple Lógica	1–7 Apr 2020	1,057	17.8	11.7	5.5	5.7	3.9	–	–	–	–	–	–	–	–	–	22.5	22.8	6.1
Intercampo/CIS	30 Mar–7 Apr 2020	3,000	25.0	14.8	7.1	9.3	5.8	2.4	1.2	1.0	0.9	0.3	0.4	0.2	0.4	–	13.9	15.3	10.2
SW Demoscopia	27–31 Mar 2020	1,102	22.9	13.4	3.3	6.5	3.5	–	–	–	–	–	–	–	–	–	32.0	7.2	9.5
DYM/Henneo	26–27 Mar 2020	1,001	21.8	14.1	8.1	7.9	8.4	–	–	–	–	–	–	–	–	–	15.8	6.9	7.7
CIS	1–13 Mar 2020	3,912	25.9	12.4	6.0	9.9	4.7	2.5	0.7	1.2	0.9	0.8	0.5	0.2	0.4	–	18.6	10.4	13.5
Simple Lógica	2–6 Mar 2020	1,029	17.3	11.1	7.3	11.7	4.6	–	–	–	–	–	–	–	–	–	18.3	20.8	5.6
Simple Lógica	3–11 Feb 2020	1,073	20.7	7.8	7.4	9.2	5.6	–	–	–	–	–	–	–	–	–	18.7	19.3	11.5
CIS	1–11 Feb 2020	2,957	24.9	13.0	7.4	10.9	5.5	2.4	1.2	1.3	0.8	0.9	0.7	0.1	0.6	–	14.8	11.6	11.9
SocioMétrica/El Español	15–18 Jan 2020	1,100	18.2	14.7	12.7	9.6	4.7	–	2.1	–	–	–	–	–	–	–	11.0		3.5
CIS	2–13 Jan 2020	2,929	23.7	13.6	6.4	10.4	4.5	3.0	1.3	0.8	1.2	1.0	0.8	0.1	0.4	–	16.1	13.0	10.1
Simple Lógica	7–10 Jan 2020	1,097	16.3	9.6	7.0	11.9	5.5	–	–	–	–	–	–	–	–	–	17.6	22.1	4.4
CIS	29 Nov–19 Dec 2019	4,800	21.6	12.3	7.2	9.4	3.2	3.0	0.9	1.7	0.7	1.2	0.6	0.3	0.3	–	21.4	12.3	9.3
Simple Lógica	2–12 Dec 2019	1,064	17.4	8.5	6.5	11.5	4.3	–	–	–	–	–	–	–	–	–	18.5	21.6	5.9
November 2019 general election	10 Nov 2019	—N/a	19.4	14.4	10.4	8.9	4.7	2.5	1.7	1.5	1.1	0.8	0.7	0.4	0.3	–	—N/a	30.1	5.0

==== Victory preferences ====
The table below lists opinion polling on the victory preferences for each party in the event of a general election taking place.

Color key:

Poll conducted after legal ban on opinion polls

Polling firm/Commissioner	Fieldwork date	Sample size	PSOE	PP	Vox	Sumar	Other/ None	Question	Lead
CIS	13–22 Jul 2023	27,060	34.9	28.5	8.4	14.8	7.2	6.2	6.4
Ipsos/La Vanguardia	3–6 Jul 2023	2,001	32.0	31.0	–	–	37.0		1.0
CIS	8–27 Jun 2023	29,201	31.0	28.4	7.7	14.0	10.9	8.0	2.6

==== Victory likelihood ====
The table below lists opinion polling on the perceived likelihood of victory for each party in the event of a general election taking place.

Color key:

Poll conducted after legal ban on opinion polls

Polling firm/Commissioner	Fieldwork date	Sample size	PSOE	PP	Vox	Unidas Podemos	Cs	Más País	Sumar	Other/ None	Question	Lead
GESOP/The Adelaide Review	18–20 Jul 2023	1,200	26.2	57.3	–		–		–	–	–	31.1
GESOP/The Adelaide Review	17–19 Jul 2023	1,200	23.9	58.7	–		–		–	–	–	34.8
GESOP/The Adelaide Review	16–18 Jul 2023	1,200	21.7	58.6	–		–		–	–	–	36.9
GESOP/The Adelaide Review	15–17 Jul 2023	1,200	19.4	59.7	–		–		–	–	–	40.3
GAD3/ABC	29 Jun–16 Jul 2023	7,002	16.8	71.5	1.2		–		0.7	9.8		54.7
GESOP/Prensa Ibérica	13–15 Jul 2023	1,200	18.7	59.0	1.8		–		0.7	–	19.8	40.3
GAD3/ABC	29 Jun–15 Jul 2023	6,501	17.1	71.3	1.6		–		0.6	9.4		54.2
GAD3/ABC	29 Jun–13 Jul 2023	6,003	17.3	71.2	1.8		–		0.6	9.1		53.9
GAD3/ABC	29 Jun–12 Jul 2023	5,502	13.7	71.2	1.8		–		0.6	12.7		57.5
GAD3/ABC	29 Jun–11 Jul 2023	5,001	15.3	69.0	1.7		–		0.9	13.1		53.7
GAD3/ABC	29 Jun–10 Jul 2023	4,503	19.4	68.1	1.4		–		1.0	10.1		48.7
GAD3/ABC	29 Jun–8 Jul 2023	4,001	20.3	66.3	1.4		–		0.9	11.1		46.0
GAD3/ABC	29 Jun–7 Jul 2023	3,502	19.9	66.5	1.3		–		0.9	11.4		46.6
Ipsos/La Vanguardia	3–6 Jul 2023	2,001	20.0	64.0	–		–		–	16.0		44.0
GAD3/ABC	29 Jun–6 Jul 2023	3,001	20.4	66.5	1.4		–		1.0	10.7		46.1
GAD3/ABC	29 Jun–5 Jul 2023	2,502	19.8	65.1	1.8		–		1.0	12.3		45.3
GAD3/ABC	29 Jun–4 Jul 2023	2,001	21.2	65.4	1.3		–		0.6	11.5		44.2
DYM/Henneo	30 Jun–3 Jul 2023	1,018	26.7	55.8	–		–		–	–	17.4	29.1
GAD3/ABC	29 Jun–3 Jul 2023	1,503	20.8	65.5	1.6		–		0.5	11.6		44.7
SocioMétrica/El Español	25 Jun–2 Jul 2023	800	23.9	49.5	–		–		–	26.6		25.6
GAD3/ABC	29–30 Jun 2023	1,004	21.1	63.2	0.8		–		0.6	14.3		42.1
GAD3/NIUS	27–28 Jun 2023	1,005	18.9	64.6	1.6		–		–	14.9		45.7
CIS	8–27 Jun 2023	29,201	19.5	65.5	0.9		–		0.8	1.4	11.8	46.0
DYM/Henneo	16–26 Jun 2023	1,522	24.2	57.5	–		–		–	–	18.2	33.3
DYM/Henneo	16–19 Jun 2023	1,015	24.2	55.6	–		–		–	–	20.3	31.4
GESOP/Prensa Ibérica	30 May–1 Jun 2023	1,003	14.6	68.5	0.7		–		–	0.3	15.9	53.9
GAD3/NIUS	8–9 May 2023	1,011	28.2	53.2	1.7		–		1.2	0.9	14.8	25.0
GESOP/Prensa Ibérica	27 Feb–1 Mar 2023	1,002	30.9	46.4	1.6	–	–	–	–	0.9	20.2	15.5
GAD3/NIUS	20–22 Feb 2023	1,001	30.5	47.4	1.7	0.9	–	–	–	19.4		16.9
Sigma Dos/Antena 3	16–22 Feb 2023	?	28.4	41.3	4.5	1.6	1.1	0.3	–	1.0	21.8	12.9
Sigma Dos/Antena 3	25 Jan 2023	?	27.8	41.9	7.4	2.1	0.9	0.4	–	1.2	18.3	14.1
GAD3/NIUS	28 Dec–4 Jan 2023	?	27.7	42.6	2.1	–	–	–	–	27.6		14.9
Sigma Dos/Antena 3	28 Dec 2022	?	26.8	41.0	8.1	1.5	2.1	0.6	–	2.0	17.9	14.2
GESOP/Prensa Ibérica	21–24 Nov 2022	1,001	33.5	44.4	1.3	0.6	–	–	–	0.1	20.1	10.9
Sigma Dos/Antena 3	17–23 Nov 2022	?	32.1	39.2	6.7	3.0	2.2	0.2	–	0.8	15.8	7.1
Sigma Dos/Antena 3	16 Oct 2022	?	24.5	44.1	7.8	3.2	2.0	0.7	–	1.2	16.5	19.6
GAD3/NIUS	19–22 Sep 2022	?	22.1	50.9	1.2	–	–	–	–	25.8		28.8
Sigma Dos/Antena 3	18–22 Jul 2022	?	21.9	48.8	6.7	2.9	1.7	0.8	–	1.0	16.3	26.9
GAD3/NIUS	12–14 Jul 2022	1,000	22.9	50.8	2.5	–	–	–	–	23.8		27.9
Sigma Dos/Antena 3	26 Jun 2022	?	20.3	55.5	5.1	0.6	0.8	1.1	–	0.5	16.0	35.2
GESOP/Prensa Ibérica	20–22 Jun 2022	1,001	15.6	65.5	1.3	0.2	0.3	–	–	0.2	16.9	49.9
GESOP/Prensa Ibérica	4–6 Apr 2022	1,000	34.4	40.2	4.2	0.1	0.1	–	–	0.1	20.9	5.8
GAD3/NIUS	14–17 Feb 2022	1,000	33.9	34.6	3.2	–	–	–	–	28.3		0.7
GESOP/Prensa Ibérica	14–16 Feb 2022	1,002	39.2	35.7	2.1	0.5	0.1	–	–	0.1	22.3	3.5
CIS	1–12 Feb 2022	3,860	47.7	27.1	1.5	–	–	–	–	2.7	21.0	20.6
GAD3/NIUS	8–11 Nov 2021	1,001	33.4	34.6	2.3	–	–	–	–	29.7		1.2
SW Demoscopia	20–30 Oct 2021	1,203	43.3	47.8	6.7	1.4	0.0	0.8	–	–	–	4.5
GAD3/NIUS	13–16 Sep 2021	1,002	25.8	42.4	3.2	–	–	–	–	28.6		16.6
GESOP/El Periódico	14–15 Jul 2021	802	33.7	46.9	1.9	0.1	–	–	–	0.2	17.2	13.2
GAD3/NIUS	7–10 Jun 2021	1,026	23.6	45.5	2.6	–	–	–	–	28.3		21.9
GAD3/NIUS	14–16 Apr 2021	1,001	43.3	20.5	1.8	–	–	–	–	34.4		22.8
GAD3/NIUS	22–25 Feb 2021	1,000	55.4	10.4	4.3	–	–	–	–	29.9		45.0
