= 2023 Spanish government formation =

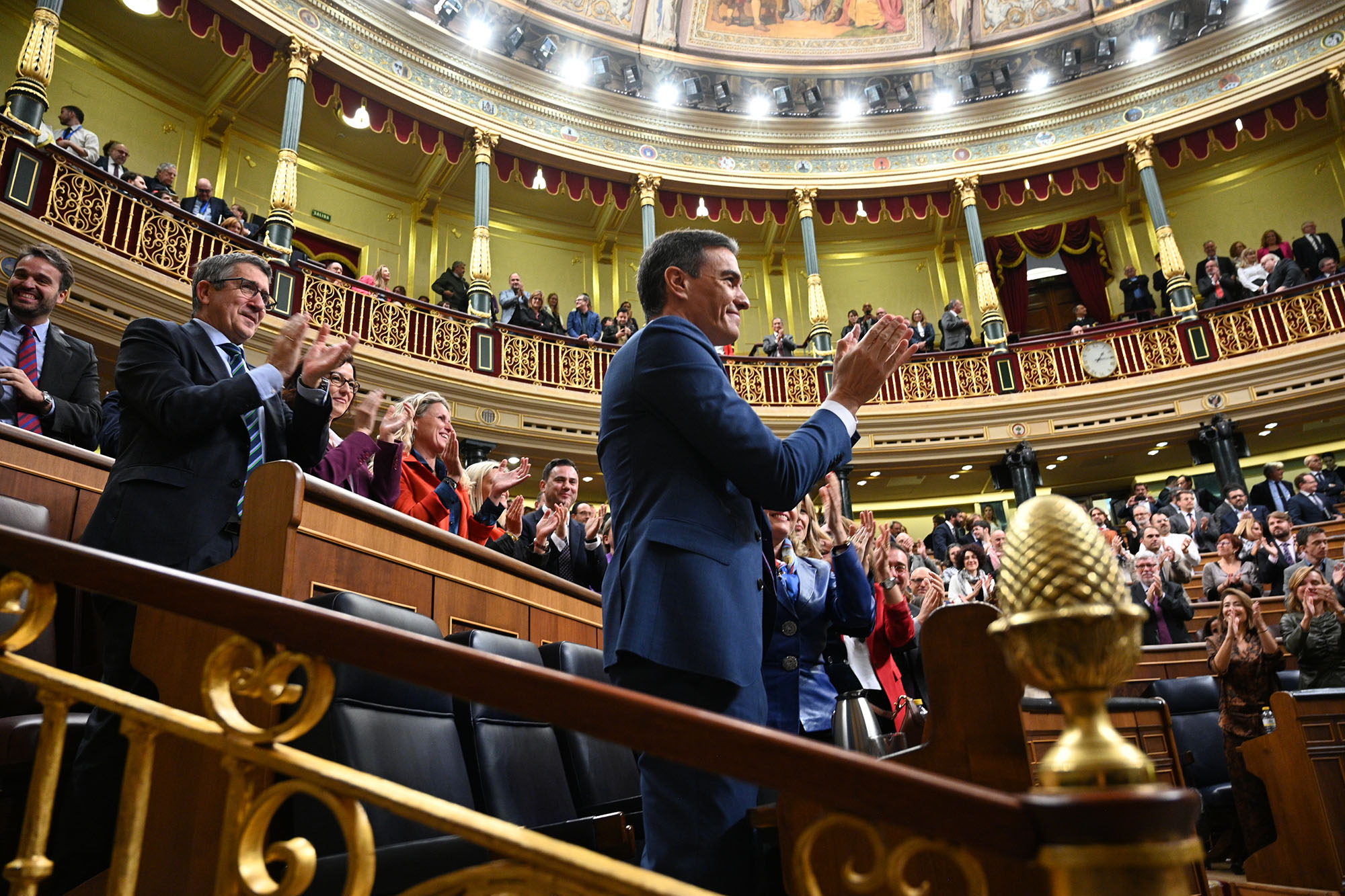
- Pedro Sánchez receiving applause from his party and cabinet after his successful investiture as prime minister on 16 November 2023
- Date: 24 July – 16 November 2023 (3 months, 3 weeks and 2 days)
- Location: Spain
- Type: Government formation
- Cause: Hung parliament following the 2023 Spanish general election
- Participants: PP; PSOE; Vox; Sumar; ERC; Junts; EH Bildu; PNV; BNG; CCa; UPN
- Outcome: Signing of PP–CCa agreement; Alberto Núñez Feijóo's failed investiture on 29 September; Signing of PSOE agreements with Sumar, ERC, Junts, PNV, BNG and CCa; Pedro Sánchez's successful investiture on 16 November; Third Sánchez government formed

After the Spanish general election of 23 July 2023 failed to deliver an overall majority for any political party, extensive negotiations ensued to form a government in the country. As a result, the previous cabinet headed by Pedro Sánchez was forced to remain in a caretaker capacity for 116 days until the next government could be sworn in.

The election failed to provide a majority for either the left-wing bloc, comprising the Spanish Socialist Workers' Party (PSOE) and Sumar, with the support of the Republican Left of Catalonia (ERC), EH Bildu, the Basque Nationalist Party (PNV) and the Galician Nationalist Bloc (BNG), or the right-wing bloc, comprising the People's Party (PP), Vox, the Navarrese People's Union (UPN), and Canarian Coalition (CCa). As a result, Together for Catalonia (Junts) was left as the kingmaker in negotiations. The unexpectedly good result for Sánchez's PSOE and the underperformance of the PP-led right-wing bloc triggered speculation over the future of PP leader Alberto Núñez Feijóo.

Following weeks of political tensions, which saw Sánchez accepting an amnesty law for Catalan separatist politicians convicted or investigated for events related to the 2017–2018 Spanish constitutional crisis and the 2019 Catalan protests, he was able to secure the support of Sumar, ERC, Junts, EH Bildu, PNV, BNG and CCa to be re-elected as prime minister by an absolute majority on 16 November 2023. This was the first time since 2011 that a repeat election was not needed, as well as the first time since that date that a candidate was elected in the first ballot of investiture. Sánchez's re-election and proposed amnesty law sparked protests that lasted for several months into 2024, but were also said to contribute to deflating support for Catalan pro-independence parties in that year's regional election, allowing Socialists' Party of Catalonia (PSC) leader Salvador Illa to become Catalan president.

== Legal provisions ==
The Spanish Constitution of 1978 outlined the procedure for government formation, which started with the monarch summoning representatives of the various political groups in the Congress of Deputies to a round of talks or consultations, after which a candidate was to be nominated through the President of the Congress to attempt investiture as prime minister.

1. After renewal of the Congress of Deputies, and in other cases provided under the Constitution, the King [sic], after consultation with the representatives appointed by the political groups with Parliamentary representation, and through the Speaker of Congress, shall nominate a candidate for President of the Government.
2. The candidate nominate in accordance with the provisions of the foregoing paragraph shall submit to the Congress of Deputies the political programme of the Government that he intends to form and shall seek the confidence of the Houses.
3. If the Congress of Deputies, by vote of the absolute majority of its members, invests said candidate with its confidence, the King shall appoint him President. If an absolute majority is not obtained, the same proposal shall be submitted for a new vote forty-eight hours after the previous vote, and it shall be considered that confidence has been secured if it passes by a simple majority.
4. If, after this vote, confidence for the investiture has not been obtained, successive proposals shall be voted upon in the manner provided in the foregoing paragraphs.
5. If within two months after the first vote for investiture no candidate has obtained the confidence of Congress, the King shall dissolve Congress and call new elections, following endorsement by the Speaker of Congress.

— Article 99 of the Spanish Constitution.

Nominated candidates are required to secure the support of an absolute majority in the Congress, or of a plurality in a subsequent vote held 48 hours later. If any of such ballots was successful, the monarch would appoint the elected candidate as prime minister. Otherwise, a two-month period would begin in which new investiture proposals could be attempted under the aforementioned procedure, with parliament being automatically dissolved and a snap election held if no candidate was successful in securing the confidence of parliament.

The procedure for investiture processes was regulated within Articles 170 to 172 of the Standing Orders of the Congress of Deputies, which provided for the investiture debate starting with the nominated candidate explaining their political programme without any time limitations. Subsequently, spokespeople from the different parliamentary groups in Congress were allowed to speak for thirty minutes, with an opportunity to reply or rectify themselves for ten minutes. The nominated candidate was allowed to take the floor and speak at any time of their request during the debate.

== Post-election developments ==
=== Initial positions ===
Congress of Deputies resulting from the 23 July 2023 general election.

Ahead of the 2023 Spanish general election, opinion polls predicted a majority for the People's Party (PP) and Vox. When this failed to materialize, both the PP and the ruling Spanish Socialist Workers' Party (PSOE) claimed the right to form a government. The possible outcomes discussed following the election were:

- An alliance of PP, Vox and the Navarrese People's Union (UPN), comprising 171 seats.
- A PSOE–Sumar coalition with support from the Republican Left of Catalonia (ERC), EH Bildu, the Basque Nationalist Party (PNV) and the Galician Nationalist Bloc (BNG), comprising 171 seats.
- Parliamentary deadlock lasting for two months from a first failed investiture ballot, leading to a new general election to be held towards the end of 2023 or in early 2024.

The Canarian Coalition (CCa) was seen as a possible part of either bloc, depending on negotiations. Other possible solutions, such as a grand coalition or the abstention of PP or PSOE in the other's investiture, were seen as unfeasible. As a result, Together for Catalonia (Junts), led by the fugitive former Catalan president Carles Puigdemont, was widely regarded as the kingmaker, with both blocs needing their seven seats to form a government, likely in exchange for concessions on Catalan independence. Míriam Nogueras, the Congress spokeswoman for Junts, said that her party "was not born to stabilise the Spanish State, but so that Catalonia may be an independent country", adding that her party's vote for Sánchez's investiture would not be given for free.

Feijóo expressed his intention to seek investiture if tasked by the King to form a government, despite difficulties. Having previously called for an end to sanchismo, (Note: Sanchismo (English: "Sanchism") is a term used derogatively by the Spanish right-wing to refer to Sánchez's government and policies.) the PP then asked PSOE to allow Feijóo's investiture, as they had done for Mariano Rajoy during the 2016 government formation process. The PSOE promptly rejected this request as impossible after "years of insults", and described it as an attempt by Feijóo to "cover up his failure" by pretending he could command sufficient support. Feijóo warned of the "breakup" of Spain if Sánchez was confirmed as prime minister with the support of pro-independence parties.

On 24 July, CCa spokeswoman Ana Oramas expressed her party's initial refusal to support a "ghost government" of Feijóo, stating that "there is no possibility that Feijóo will be prime minister". This rejection was echoed hours later by Andoni Ortuzar, the president of the PNV, which refused even to enter talks with the PP. Vox stated on 26 July that they could enable Feijóo's investiture "if he could convince a couple of PSOE's deputies" to vote for him, while warning that they would not give the "patriotic vote" of their 33 deputies for free. On 25 July, Arnaldo Otegi, the leader of EH Bildu, announced that his party's six deputies would vote for Sánchez and the PSOE during the investiture vote. ERC said it was favourable to Sánchez's investiture, pending a vote among its membership, while the BNG announced it could vote for Sánchez to avoid a right-wing government, but without granting him a "blank cheque".

=== Feijóo's unlikely alliance ===
The PP's result in the election—well below expectations of reaching above 150 or 160 seats—triggered criticism of Feijóo's performance as party leader. During election night, party supporters interrupted Feijóo's hastily reworked victory speech with chants of "Ayuso, Ayuso!", in reference to Isabel Díaz Ayuso, the Madrilenian president, who some within the party and the Spanish right-wing saw as a possible successor as PP leader.

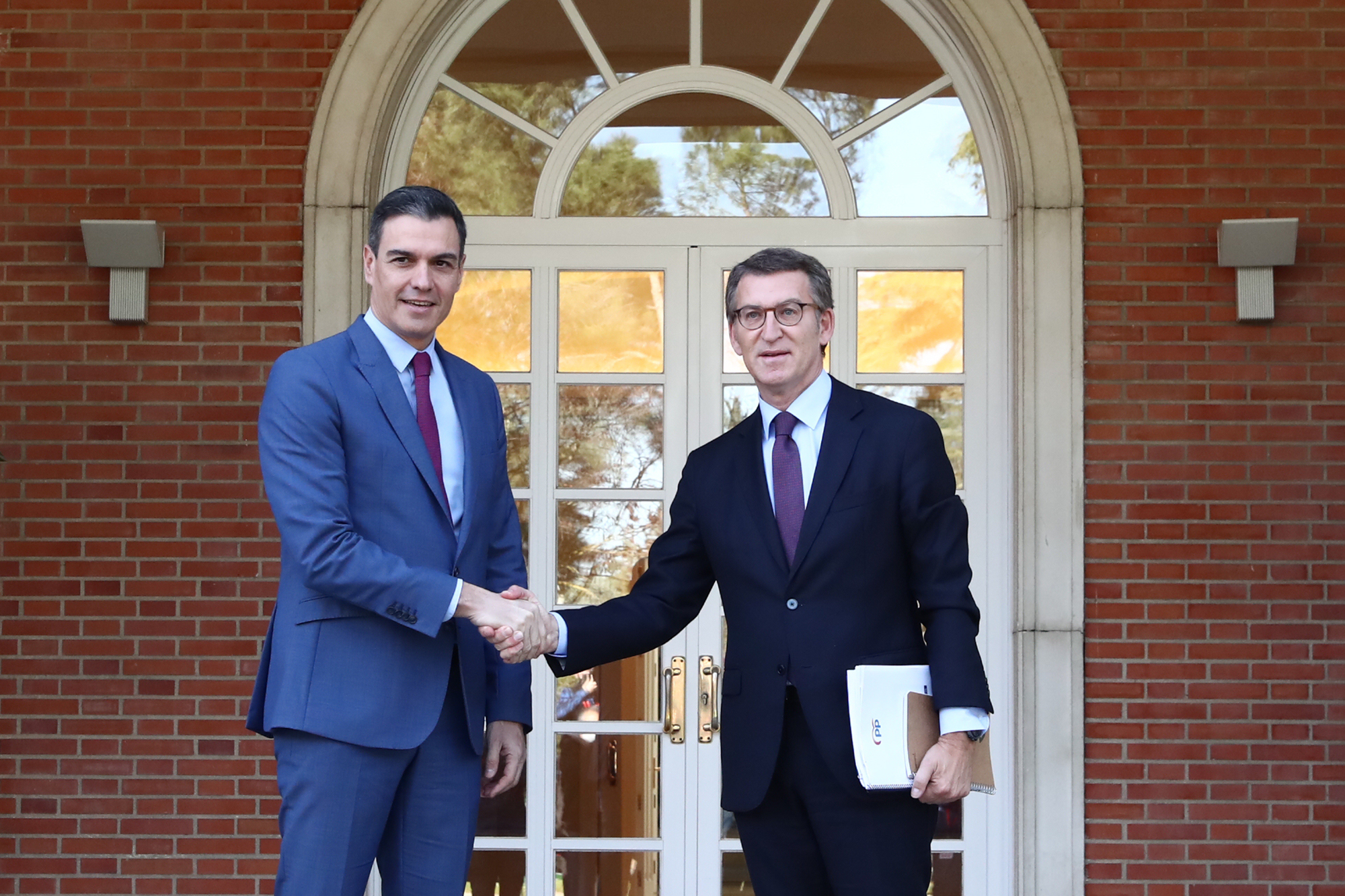
PP leader Alberto Núñez Feijóo unsuccessfully attempted to convince Sánchez's PSOE to allow him to govern as the candidate of "the most voted political force" (pictured, both men in April 2022).

Former Madrilenian president Esperanza Aguirre said during an interview that the election result was attributable to Feijóo's strategy of "seeking to reach out to the PSOE rather than governing with Vox", and commented that Ayuso was the future of the party and of Spain. Ayuso herself acknowledged on 26 July that she had received messages asking her "to take a step forward", but said she was not thinking of challenging Feijóo's leadership. "It cannot be that on Thursday we are giving him our support and applauding him [at a rally], and now throwing him off a bridge", she said. However, she warned Feijóo against seeking an agreement with the PSOE, commenting that "you cannot reach a deal with the disaster". On 27 July, party secretary-general Cuca Gamarra criticized Aguirre's remarks as outside the party's unity and discourse.

Some commentators voiced doubts over whether Feijóo would be willing or able to remain in opposition in the event that Sánchez was able to secure a second term in office. Following the counting of the expat vote, one seat in Madrid was flipped from PSOE to PP, meaning that Sánchez's investiture would require an affirmative vote from Junts, not just an abstention. The PP then U-turned on its previous hardline stance towards Junts on 29 July, expressing willingness to engage in talks with Puigdemont's party "within the Constitution's framework" in order to invest Feijóo as prime minister, though this was later ruled out by Gamarra. That same day, Puigdemont tweeted that his party would not be convinced by "political blackmail", and saw only three possibilities out of the deadlock: Junts voting in favour of Sánchez, the PSOE allowing Feijóo's investiture, or a repeat election. Sánchez and the PSOE were said to be in no hurry, instead allowing Junts time to "reflect" on their options as Feijóo exhausted himself looking for support.

On 30 July, Feijóo sent an official letter to Sánchez, softening the tone his party had maintained against him for years, and asking for a meeting the following week to negotiate a solution that allowed the party with the most votes to govern. Sánchez wrote back the same day noting that, in a parliamentary democracy, "it is whoever secures the most support in Congress, and not the most votes, who is entitled to govern", and reminding Feijóo of the multiple PP–Vox agreements reached in previous years throughout Spain in which the PP did not finish in first place. Sánchez said he would wait until the Congress convened for the new parliamentary term on 17 August, and the King nominated a candidate for investiture, before meeting Feijóo, "as well as the rest of spokespersons of the parliamentary groups with representation".

By 31 July, Feijóo's investiture became increasingly unfeasible. CCa, until then considered as a likely Feijóo ally, expressed its willingness to negotiate an investiture agreement with Sánchez, on the grounds that, while it rejected any government that included either Sumar or Vox, it felt closer to Yolanda Díaz's party than to Santiago Abascal's. UPN leader Javier Esparza, who had pledged his party's support to Feijóo, acknowledged that, while it was legitimate for Feijóo to continue seeking support for his investiture, it was unlikely for him to be elected prime minister "in any of the scenarios", and said Feijóo could not "keep fooling people". The same day, Vox attacked Feijóo, blaming him for the failure to win a right-wing majority in the election and accusing him of "deceiving all Spaniards". The party's secretary-general Jorge Buxadé said that "Feijóo spent the campaign talking about how he was close to an absolute majority, encouraged by his own rigged opinion polls". This came after it was revealed that Feijóo and Abascal had met secretly after the election to analyze the results.

On 6 August, Abascal offered to support Feijóo's investiture for a minority government without demanding cabinet posts for his party "in order to prevent Sánchez from being elected with the support of Spain's enemies", a reference to pro-independence parties. However, party members acknowledged this unconditional support was offered due to Feijóo having no chance of being elected. The next day, the PP attempted to use the possibility of a government without Vox as leverage to gain the PNV's support, to which the PNV replied that they had expressed their opposition to Feijóo's investiture "with crystal clarity" on 24 July.

=== Parliamentary setup ===
Media focus centered around the possible outcome of the vote for the Congress bureau when the chamber reconvened on 17 August, while the PP's absolute majority in the Senate ensured control of the latter's bureau. Both PP and PSOE attempted to secure the support of minor parties for their candidates to the post of president of the Congress of Deputies: the PP fielded Cuca Gamarra as their candidate, while the PSOE nominated former president of the Balearic Islands, Francina Armengol.

Ahead of the election, both parties were tied at 171 expected votes for the post: Gamarra had the declared support of PP (137), Vox (33)—in exchange for a vice presidency in the chamber's bureau—and UPN (1), while Armengol was expected to have the support of PSOE (121), Sumar (31), ERC (7), EH Bildu (6), PNV (5) and the BNG (1). The final positions of Junts (7) and CCa (1) were seen as decisive: if Junts did not support Armengol, CCa's single vote could decide the outcome. In an attempt to break the deadlock, CCa proposed on 13 August that the Congress of Deputies should be presided over by a member of the PNV. Feijóo was said to be willing to cede the post to the PNV in return for their support to Feijóo's investiture, but this was later ruled out due to the risk of losing Vox's backing (who rejected supporting a PNV candidate for a post in the Congress bureau). On 16 August, the day before the vote, Feijóo assured in a meeting of his party's elected MPs that he had the confirmed support of "171 or 172 deputies", with talks ongoing to secure the support of CCa.

The PSOE engaged in negotiations against the clock to secure the support of Junts, which had threatened to cast blank or invalid ballots and allow Gamarra's election with the support of PP and Vox. In the morning of 17 August, it was announced that the PSOE had reached an agreement with both Junts and ERC, promising to normalize the use of Catalan in Congress and EU institutions and to promote various inquiry committees (focused on Pegasus espionage and the 2017 Barcelona attacks) in exchange for both parties committing their support for Armengol and PSOE/Sumar candidates in the bureau.

Election of the President of the Congress of Deputies
Ballot →	17 August 2023	
Required majority →	176 out of 350	
Francina Armengol (PSOE)	178 / 350	check
Cuca Gamarra (PP)	139 / 350	X mark
Ignacio Gil Lázaro (Vox)	33 / 350	X mark
Blank ballots	0 / 350	
Invalid ballots	0 / 350	
Absentees	0 / 350	

Armengol received support from the PSOE, Sumar, ERC, Junts, EH Bildu, PNV and the BNG, and was elected in the first ballot with 178 votes, two more than required for election. Unexpectedly, Gamarra received only 139 votes (of PP, UPN and CCa), with Vox voting for their own candidate after the PP refused to cede them a bureau post. This voting pattern was repeated for the remaining posts (four vice presidencies and four secretaries), with PSOE and Sumar securing a majority of five posts in the parliamentary body, and the PP taking the remaining four. Vox leader Santiago Abascal described the results as "a real shame" and said he would demand an explanation from the PP, or else he would re-evaluate his party's support for any investiture attempt by Feijóo. The outcome was seen as a victory for Pedro Sánchez, as the right-wing bloc split left Feijóo in a precarious parliamentary situation for his investiture. Later that day, following an emergency meeting of Feijóo with his executive to assess the political situation, it was reported that the PP was considering holding a party congress to boost Feijóo's leadership internally.

== Candidate Alberto Núñez Feijóo (PP) ==
=== Nomination and negotiations ===
King Felipe VI summoned political parties for a round of consultations on 21 and 22 August to decide whether to nominate a candidate for investiture. The king faced a difficult choice as, for the first time in the democratic era, two candidates—Sánchez and Feijóo—were equally intent on being nominated. Feijóo's intentions were unchanged by his recent parliamentary setback, despite calls from some factions within his party asking him to "leave the fiction" of insisting that he had the required support for his investiture.

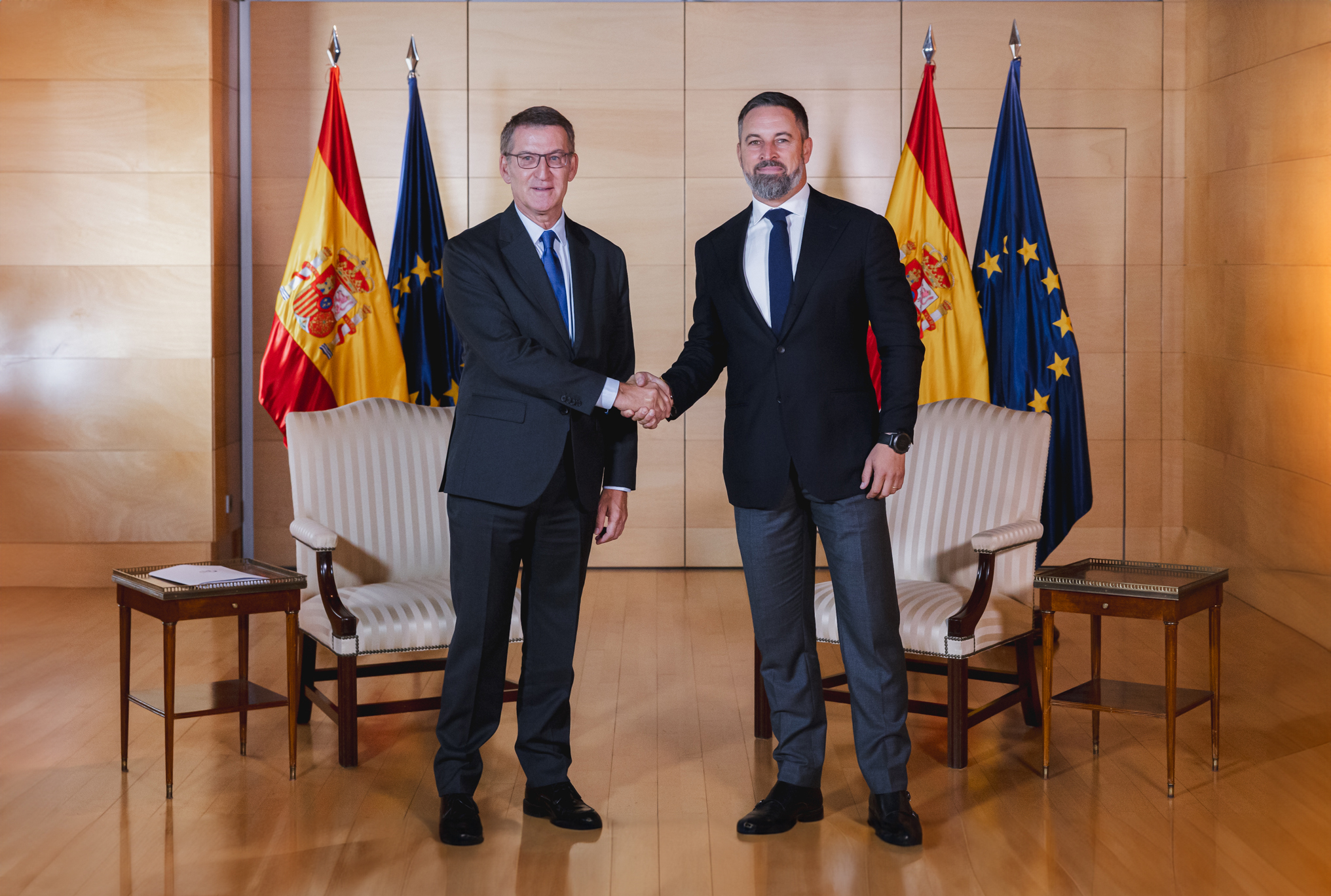
Alberto Núñez Feijoó meeting Vox leader Santiago Abascal on 5 September 2023.

Despite Feijóo's chances, the King nominated him as candidate on 22 August. He justified his decision by stating that the PP had won the most seats and that, since no other clear majority for investiture had been revealed during the round of consultations (Sánchez had been clear in that he was the only candidate able to muster a parliamentary majority, but acknowledged that he did not have it yet), the tradition of nominating the leader of the largest party should continue, while not precluding the nomination of other candidates in the event of failure. Sánchez had previously told the King that an investiture was not an "exhibition procedure", but that he would not oppose Feijóo being nominated first. New Congress speaker, Francina Armengol, stated that she had agreed with Feijóo to set the start of the investiture debate for 26 September, with the first ballot being scheduled for 27 September and the date of a hypothetical new general election being automatically set for 14 January 2024. The PP asked for time to secure the required numbers for the ballot, aiming to persuade the PNV, Junts or even ERC to abstain, despite these parties having already voiced their opposition to a PP government. PP negotiations with CCa proved more successful, with an agreement being immediately signed on 22 August in exchange for the fulfillment of a "Canarian agenda" of 55 points.

The PP's approaches to Junts caused an internal rift with the party's Catalan branch, whose leader, Alejandro Fernández, publicly expressed his opposition to any talks with Puigdemont's party. On 27 August, Feijóo acknowledged that he would be defeated in his investiture attempt, but said he would be presenting a government programme that would lay "the first stone" for future attempts. Feijóo also tried to meet regional presidents to ask if they wanted to "contribute" to his program, but this was rejected by all non-PP regional premiers. In a meeting with Sánchez on 30 August, Feijóo asked the PSOE to facilitate his investiture for a 15-ministry government that would pass six major state pacts in a legislature to last a maximum of two years, with a new election scheduled for 2025. The PSOE mocked Feijóo's proposal as asking Sánchez to help him repeal sanchismo, while privately expressing bewilderment with the PP's continuous changes in strategy.

=== Amnesty and languages controversies ===
Sumar leader Yolanda Díaz and Junts leader Carles Puigdemont met in Brussels on 4 September, allegedly in search of a "stable relationship" to "explore democratic solutions to the political conflict" in Catalonia. Following this meeting, the PP shifted towards accusing Pedro Sánchez of negotiating with Junts to grant its request of an amnesty law for all those convicted or prosecuted for the events surrounding the 2017 Catalan independence referendum and the 2017–2018 Spanish constitutional crisis. The following day, Feijóo announced his refusal to engage in further talks with Junts "if the requirement is to compromise on an amnesty", while Vox reaffirmed its support for Feijóo's investiture "in the face of the blow to the Constitution that would occur from La Moncloa if Pedro Sánchez is proclaimed prime minister". Nonetheless, the PP later acknowledged maintaining "informal contacts" with Junts in the weeks previous to Feijóo's investiture attempt on 26–27 September.

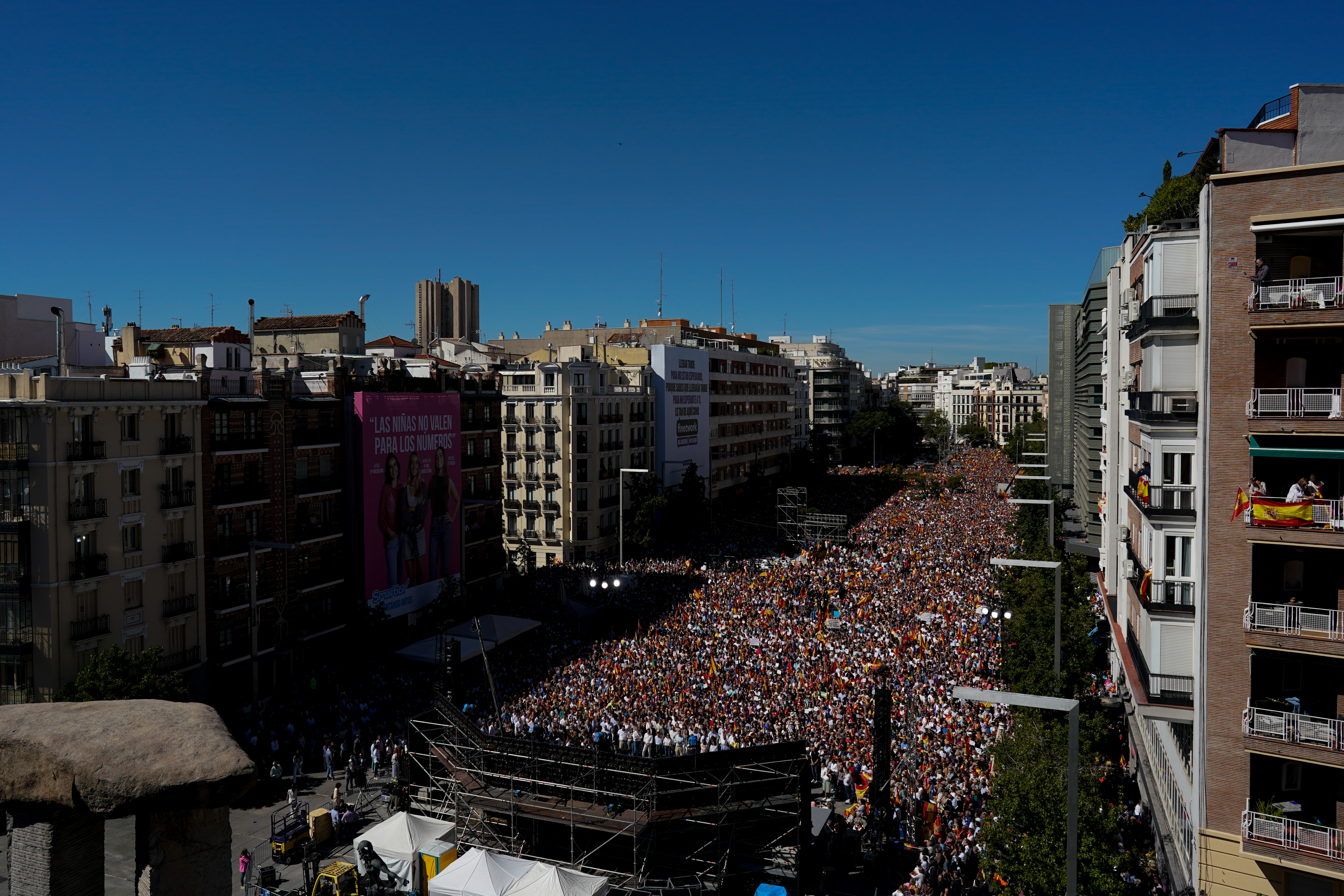
PP's demonstration in Madrid against the proposed amnesty law on 24 September 2023.

PSOE and Sumar expressed differing stances on how to approach the negotiations with Junts: whereas Sumar claimed than an amnesty was "a constitutional and democratic formula" that was an acceptable "payment" for investiture, the PSOE explained that "[Their] working method is to explain the agreements once they have occurred". The issue of the amnesty also caused internal rifts within the PSOE, with former prime minister Felipe González and deputy prime minister Alfonso Guerra, as well as the incumbent president of Castilla–La Mancha, Emiliano García-Page, among the leading critics.

The PP's announcement of a demonstration in Madrid on 24 September against the proposed amnesty, two days ahead of the scheduled investiture debate, saw the expulsion from the PSOE of Nicolás Redondo Terreros—former leader of the Socialist Party of the Basque Country—"for his repeated contempt for the party", after a long history of clashes with the party leadership's decisions which culminated in his vocal support for the PP-led protests. This prompted Feijóo's party to attempt to stir a revolt within the PSOE's ranks to secure, through floor-crossing, the few parliamentary votes that he needed to succeed. The demonstration gathered about 40,000 to 60,000 people from across Spain to protest against Sánchez, which the PP described as a successful show of force ahead of Feijóo's investiture and "the largest political rally in its history". The PSOE criticized the protest, arguing that it saw the acknowledgment of Feijóo's failure to secure a parliamentary majority for his investiture.

Simultaneously, a reform of the Congress internal regulations was proposed to allow for the use of co-official languages (Catalan, Basque, Galician and others with official status in any autonomous community) in parliamentary debates, the fulfillment of PSOE's pledge to ERC and Junts in exchange for their support for Armengol's election as speaker. This proposal was passed by Congress on 21 September with a 180–170 result, with one PP deputy erroneously casting a "yes" vote.

=== First investiture attempt ===
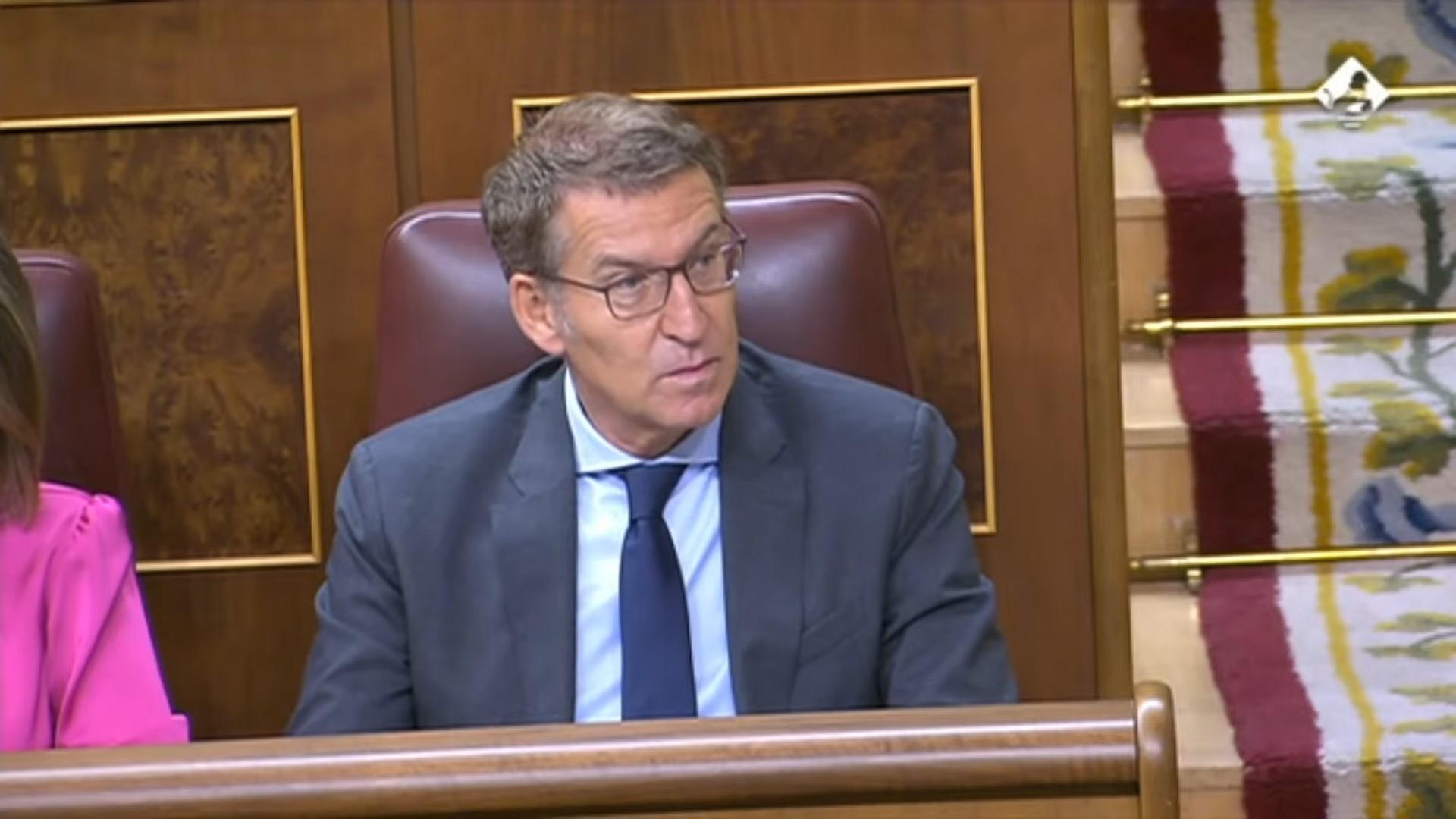
Alberto Núñez Feijoó during the second day of debate on his investiture on 27 September 2023.

Alberto Núñez Feijóo's investiture debate was scheduled to start at 12:00 CEST (UTC+2) on 26 September with Feijóo's speech, to be followed by responses from all other parties and a first round of voting on 27 September, with a second and final ballot on 29 September if required.

In what was regarded by the media as an attempt to reaffirm his leadership within the PP, Feijóo used his speech to attack Sánchez and the amnesty proposal tabled by Catalan pro-independence parties. He also invoked his party's status as the most-voted force and stated that, while he had the votes to be prime minister within his reach, he would not "pay the price" for them. He also turned on the PNV for refusing to grant him their five decisive votes. Previously, Feijóo had arrived to the Congress accompanied by every deputy of his parliamentary group.

The PSOE unexpectedly sent former mayor of Valladolid Óscar Puente, instead of Sánchez himself, to take the floor against Feijóo. Puente, who had been ousted from his post by a PP–Vox alliance following the 28 May local elections despite having led the most-voted political force, criticized Feijóo for his inconsistency in this regard and asked him: "Why do you have more right to be prime minister than I do to be mayor of my city?" Vox leader Santiago Abascal asserted his party's support to Feijóo claiming that he had met his party's demands, while also inviting the PP to a "collaboration without complexes" to bring down Sánchez.

Investiture; Congress of Deputies; Nomination of Alberto Núñez Feijóo (PP)
Ballot →	27 September 2023	29 September 2023 (Note: 1 Junts MP involuntarily cast an invalid ballot in the 29 September vote.)
Required majority →	176 out of 350	Simple
Yes: • PP (137); • Vox (33); • CCa (1); • UPN (1)	172 / 350	172 / 350
No: • PSOE (121); • Sumar (31); • ERC (7); • Junts (7) (6 on 29 Sep); • EH Bildu (6); • PNV (5); • BNG (1)	178 / 350	177 / 350
Abstentions	0 / 350	0 / 350
Absentees	0 / 350	0 / 350

As expected, Feijóo's investiture failed to pass either ballot, being supported by his own party as well as Vox, CCa and UPN and opposed by everyone else. Several voting mistakes became newsworthy: during the first ballot, PSOE MP for Teruel Herminio Sancho's "yes" reaction to his name being mispronounced was initially considered a vote in support of Feijóo, which was immediately corrected; in the second ballot, Junts deputy Eduard Pujol erroneusly cast an affirmative vote for Feijóo's investiture which was not corrected in time, which led to the Congress bureau extraordinarily considering it as an invalid ballot against the PP's protests.

== Candidate Pedro Sánchez (PSOE) ==
=== Investiture developments ===
Following Feijóo's defeat, King Felipe VI summoned all parties to a new round of consultations on 2 and 3 October, after which he nominated Pedro Sánchez as the next candidate to attempt the investiture. Upon his nomination, Sánchez commented that he was "not going to a false investiture", adding that everything agreed to secure the investiture would be "within the Constitution" and that agreements would be "transparent and known".

In the following weeks, the PP criticized Sánchez and Congress speaker Armengol for not setting the investiture date, casting doubts on Armengol's neutrality. Negotiations with other parties soon focused on the issue of amnesty; by 8 October, talks were underway with the PNV while the PSOE sought to overcome tensions between Junts and ERC, and on 12 October Sánchez spoke publicly about an amnesty law being negotiated with the two Catalan parties. On 24 October, Pedro Sánchez and Yolanda Díaz signed an agreement to form a new coalition government, which included pledges to reduce the working week, raise the minimum wage and increase parental leave. In an attempt to hasten talks with PNV, EH Bildu and BNG, as well as with Junts and ERC, Sánchez announced on 28 October that he had agreed to back an amnesty law, to include all those involved in the controversial 2017 Catalan independence referendum and the subsequent constitutional crisis. He acknowledged that this was a U-turn on his previous stance to regard the amnesty as unlawful, but said it was necessary "in the interest of Spain and in defence of coexistence between Spaniards".

On 2 November, an agreement was reached with ERC to support Sánchez's investiture in exchange for the amnesty law—to include all those prosecuted for the organization of the 2014 Catalan self-determination referendum, the Democratic Tsunami, and the Committees for the Defense of the Republic (CDRs)—the transfer of Rodalies de Catalunya to the Catalan government, and forgiveness of part of Catalonia's debt to the state through a mechanism that could be extended to other autonomous communities. Simultaneously, an agreement was reached with the BNG to reduce tolls on two Galician highways (AP-9 and AP-53) and the expansion of railway connections in Galicia. CCa, which had voted in favour of Feijóo's failed investiture, announced its abstention in Sánchez's, on the grounds that it was "comfortable with any government" that could depend on its vote. The party also did not rule out an affirmative vote if the PSOE agreed to their agenda for the Canary Islands.

Negotiations with Junts were more challenging. An agreement was considered as all but certain following the publication of a photo by both Junts and PSOE on 30 October showing PSOE organization secretary Santos Cerdán and Carles Puigdemont together in Brussels, but the negotiations stalled after ERC's pledge of support to Sánchez. Disagreements over the wording and scope of the proposed amnesty law were reported to be the main obstacles to an accord, in particular whether it would apply to those prosecuted or convicted for corruption scandals (such as the family of Jordi Pujol or Junts president Laura Borràs), which the PSOE opposed. Junts secretary-general Jordi Turull was reported as saying that "we will not leave any soldier stranded. We will not do a VIP-only amnesty". Negotiations continued for longer than initially expected, but an agreement was finally reached on the night of 8 November, and formally announced the next day. The accord stopped short of granting several of Puigdemont's maximalist requests, but was said to come at a "heavy price" for the PSOE. Following the announcement of the PSOE–Junts agreement, the investiture debate was set to start on 15 November, with the first ballot scheduled for 16 November. Finally, agreements with both the PNV and CCa for their supporting votes were reached on 10 November, virtually guaranteeing Sánchez's investiture in the first ballot.

=== Reactions to amnesty and PSOE–Junts alliance ===
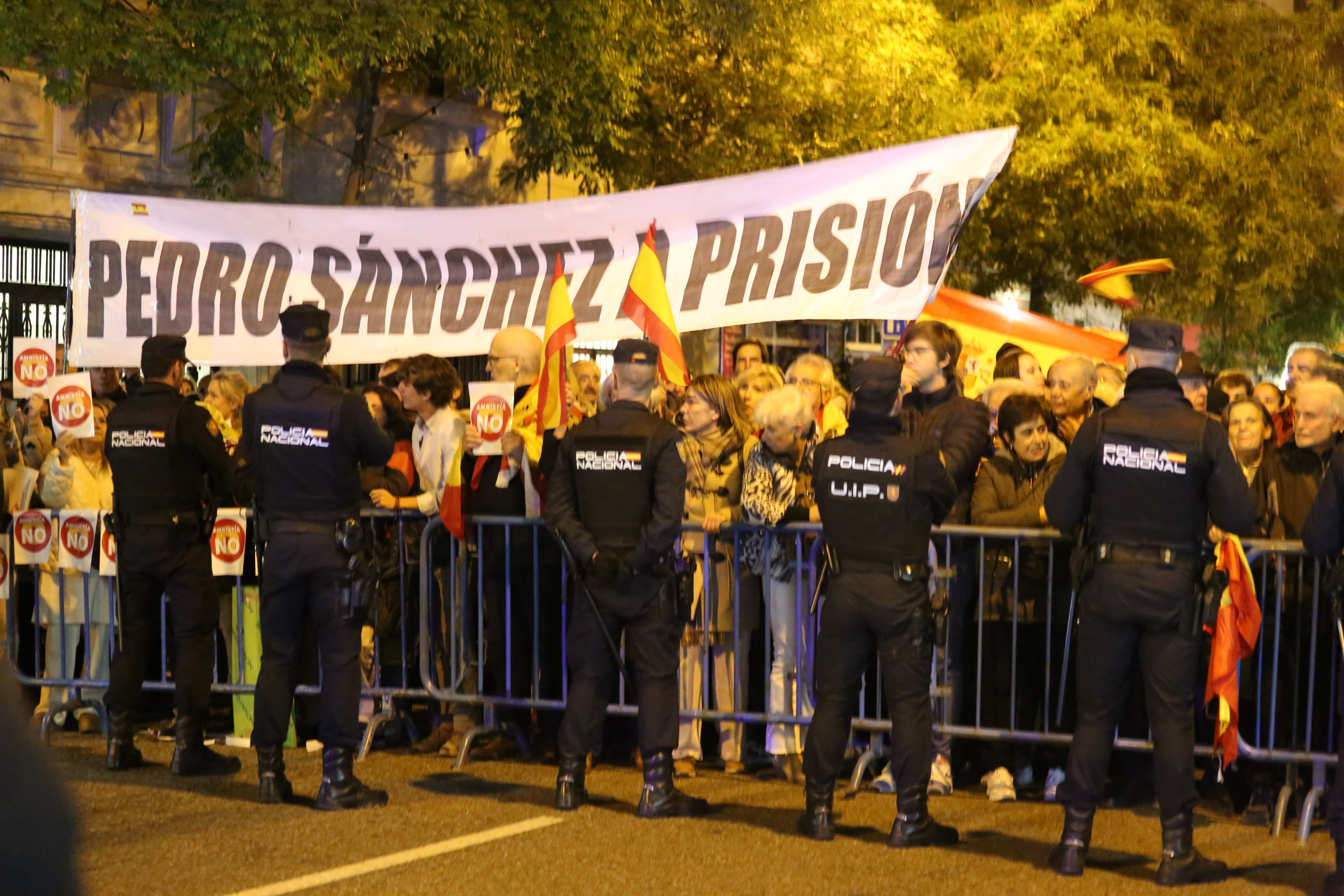
A demonstration against the amnesty in front of PSOE's HQs in Madrid on 6 November 2023, with a sign stating "Pedro Sánchez to prison".

In a meeting between Pedro Sánchez and Alberto Núñez Feijóo on 9 October, Sánchez reminded the PP leader of "the need to respect the electoral results of last 23-J, parliamentary democracy, and the majority will of the citizens to form a government of progress", whereas Feijóo accused Sánchez of "massive electoral fraud" while warning that the PP would oppose any amnesty law "with all intensity". The PP described the proposed amnesty as an "attack on democracy" and demanded a re-run of the general election, while adopting a strategy of street protests against the incoming government. Vox and other right-wing groups called a demonstration in Plaza de Colón for 29 October, which saw 100,000 people peacefully protesting the formation of the new government. The PP also called a political rally in Valencia for 5 November, which saw 10,000 to 20,000 people protesting.

Political tensions grew following a controversial speech by former prime minister José María Aznar on 2 November, in which he described Sánchez as "a danger to Spanish constitutional democracy" and asked supporters to "assume the risks" of acting against him, stating: "Whoever can speak, let them speak; whoever can do, let them do; whoever can contribute, let him contribute; whoever can move, let them move." These remarks were later interpreted by political commentators as an attempt to politically interfere with the investiture process, or to instigate a right-wing uprising. That same day, eight conservative-leaning members of the General Council of the Judiciary (CGPJ)—in a deep constitutional crisis over a lack of renewal since 2018—called for an extraordinary plenary session to approve an institutional declaration against the amnesty. The majority association of judges, the conservative Professional Association of Magistrates, issued a further declaration criticising the amnesty as unlawful and as "the beginning of the end" of democracy. The progressive Judges for Democracy association criticized the actions of the CGPJ, due to its interim nature, the perceived overreach of its functions, and the fact that the contents of the amnesty law were still unknown. The CGPJ's acting president later asked the institution's members not to interfere in politics.

On 3 November, a manifesto against the amnesty law signed by over 300 Spanish jurists was registered in the Cortes Generales. In response, 200 jurists released a separate manifesto on 6 November defending the amnesty and criticizing any "attacks on the normal functioning of institutions". That same day, National Court judge Manuel García-Castellón indicted Puigdemont and ERC secretary-general Marta Rovira for crimes of terrorism during the 2019 Catalan protests, specifically during the riots involving the Democratic Tsunami and the CDRs, in a move seen as interference in the investiture negotiations. This followed a Civil Guard report delivered three weeks ahead of schedule. Prosecutors considered the evidence presented against Puigdemont and Rovira as "insufficient", and argued that the judge was "misrepresenting, making assumptions and omitting data".

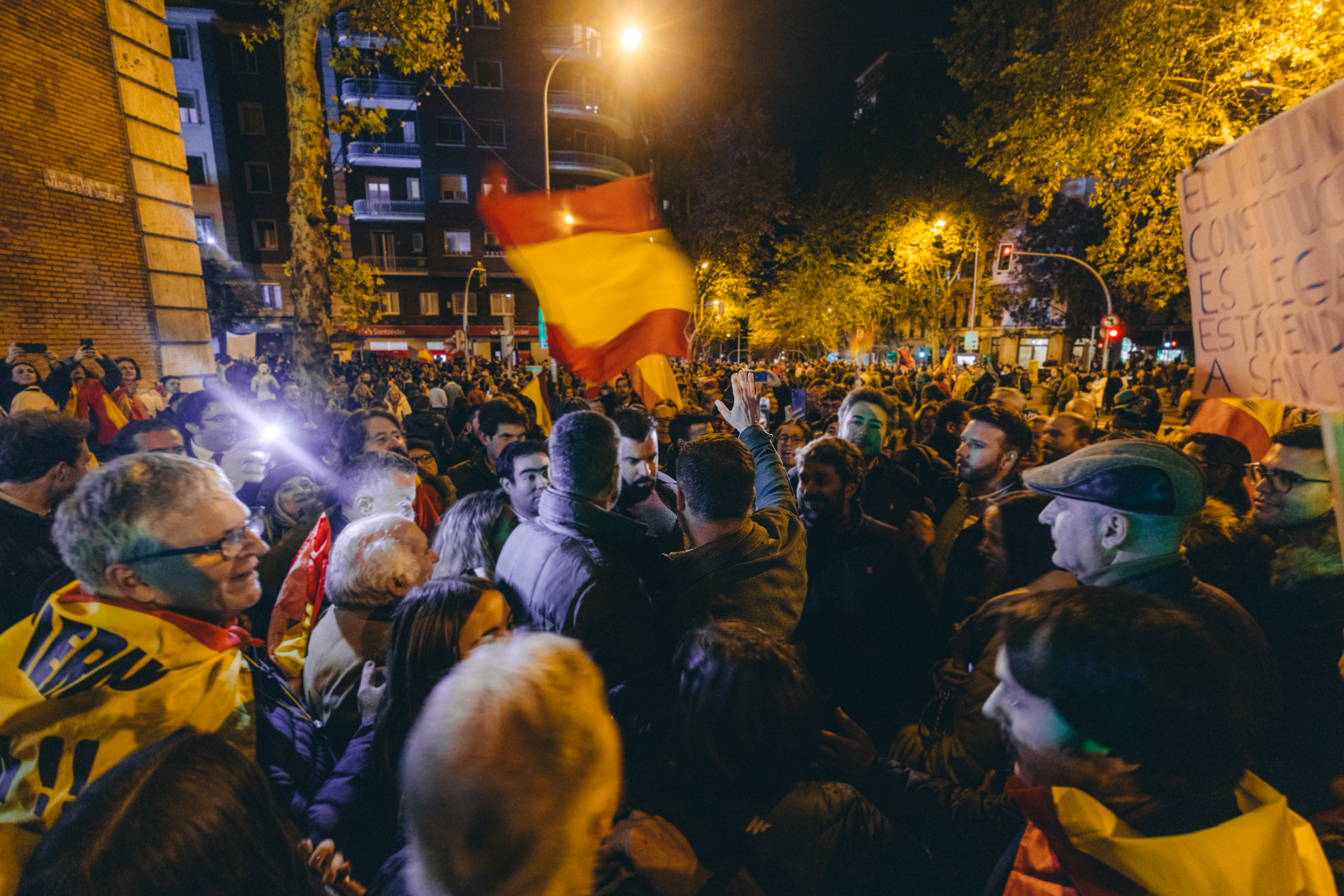
Vox leader Santiago Abascal in one of the protests in front of PSOE's HQs in Madrid on 7 November 2023.

The amnesty was supported by the Financial Times which, while viewing it as an "expedient policy" by a Pedro Sánchez who "would not go down this path if his job were not on the line", also regarded it as "a gamble worth taking" to ease tensions in Catalan society following the 2017 events. On 8 November, European Commissioner for Justice Didier Reynders sent a letter to the Spanish government requesting more information "on the personal, material and temporal scope" of the planned amnesty law, as it had become "an issue of considerable importance in public debate" seeing how the European Commission had been contacted about it "among others, by a large number of citizens"; the Spanish government replied that legislative initiative belonged to Congress, not the executive branch, which was still in acting capacity and was legally barred from tabling any bill. The European Commission later commented that, beyond the information request, it was not concerned by the amnesty law proposal and that it was an "internal affair" of Spain.

Starting on 3 November 2023, street protests were organized outside PSOE offices around Spain, with the main focus on the party's headquarters on Calle de Ferraz in Madrid. Initially peaceful, the protests came under scrutiny because of the participation of Vox members as well as far-right and neo-Nazi organizations. The largest of the protests, on 7 November, was attended by 7,000 people; the ensuing riots saw 29 police officers wounded, as well as an attempt to force entry into the heavily fortified Congress. The protests saw frequent chants against Pedro Sánchez, immigration, the Constitution and the monarchy as well as sexist slurs and fascist and francoist symbology. Sánchez condemned the harassment of his party's headquarters by "reactionaries", and proclaimed that "no one will be able to intimidate the PSOE", receiving the support of other parties. Feijóo blamed Sánchez for creating "social unrest" and called for further protests to be held on 12 November. Basque lehendakari Iñigo Urkullu, a member of the PNV, demanded Feijóo to "call off his protests against the amnesty law", as they were "serving as an excuse to generate hatred, resentment and violence".

In response to PSOE–Junts agreement, Madrid premier Ayuso controversially stated during an interview on Antena 3 that Spain was "entering a dictatorship", and that she was counting on the King, the security forces and the army to "save the situation". Associations of judges and prosecutors, bar associations, tax inspectors, labor inspectors, police unions, law firms and the CGPJ issued statements criticizing references both to "lawfare"—the alleged judicialization of politics during the 2017 and subsequent events—and the creation of parliamentary inquiry committees in the signed text of the agreement, describing it as an unprecedented attack on the judiciary's independence. The PSOE remarked that these inquiry committees would not investigate lawfare nor supervise judges but, rather, oversee political maneuvers such as Operation Catalonia—the alleged gathering of information about Catalan independence leaders without judicial authorization aimed at creating false evidence—and the use of Pegasus spyware against Catalan and Basque officials. On 10 November, the Pro-Civil Guard Association (APROGC) issued a statement expressing their "deep concern" on the amnesty law and stating to be "willing to shed even the last drop of blood in defence of the sovereignty and independence of Spain and its constitutional order"; the Interior ministry subsequently opened an investigation to determine whether the APROGC statements constituted any disciplinary or criminal infraction.

=== Party membership votes ===
Several of the parties involved in the negotiations held internal votes among their members to gauge support for Pedro Sánchez's investiture. PSOE and Socialists' Party of Catalonia (PSC) members approved of the renewal of the alliance with Sumar and the support "of other political formations to achieve the required majority" by 88% and 87% respectively, in votes held between 30 October and 4 November.

30 October–4 November PSOE & PSC membership vote
Question: "Do you support the accord to form a government with Sumar and secure the support of other political formations to achieve the required majority?"
PSOE			PSC		
Choice	Votes	%	Choice	Votes	%
Yes	95,365	87.96	Yes	6,742	87.48
No	13,053	12.04	No	965	12.52
Valid votes	108,418	99.05	Valid votes	7,707	97.45
Invalid or blank votes	1,035	0.95	Invalid or blank votes	202	2.55
Total votes	109,453	100.00	Total votes	7,909	100.00
Registered voters and turnout	172,611	63.41	Registered voters and turnout	12,835	61.62
Source			Source		

ERC's membership approved the signed agreement on 3 November with 91% of valid votes, whereas Junts did so with the support of 86% of its members on a 67% turnout in a vote held between 11 and 12 November.

3 November ERC membership vote
Question: "Do you agree with Republican Left voting in favor of the investiture of Pedro Sánchez in exchange for the amnesty law, the second phase of the resolution of the political conflict to address the referendum, the comprehensive transfer of Rodalies, economic commitments and proposals to reduce the fiscal deficit?"
Choice	Votes	%
Yes	3,292	91.29
No	314	8.71
Valid votes	3,606	97.72
Invalid or blank votes	84	2.28
Total votes	3,690	100.00
Registered voters and turnout	8,461	43.61

11–12 November Junts membership vote
Question: "Do you ratify the agreement signed in Brussels between Together for Catalonia and the PSOE, which establishes both the conditions and mechanisms for the resolution of the political conflict between Catalonia and the Spanish State and in which we shall propose a self-determination referendum?"
Choice	Votes	%
Yes	—	86.17
No	—	13.83
Valid votes	—	99.99
Invalid or blank votes	—	0.01
Total votes	—	100.00
Registered voters and turnout	—	67.00
Source (Note: Full results were not published.)

Within Sumar, members of United Left (IU) voted 85% in favour of joining a PSOE–Sumar coalition in an internal vote held between 3 and 5 November, while 87% of Podemos members approved their party's deputies to vote in favour of Sánchez's investiture in a vote held between 11 and 14 November.

3–5 November IU membership vote
Question: "Based on the government agreement between Sumar and PSOE, do you agree with IU participating in a coalition government between Sumar and PSOE?"
Choice	Votes	%
Yes	4,565	86.97
No	684	13.03
Valid votes	5,249	97.93
Invalid or blank votes	111	2.07
Total votes	5,360	100.00
Registered voters and turnout	—	32.00
Source (Note: The number of registered voters was not published.)

11–14 November Podemos membership vote
Question: "Should Podemos deputies support the investiture of Pedro Sánchez?"
Choice	Votes	%
Yes	47,675	86.27
No	7,586	13.73
Valid votes	55,261	99.80
Invalid or blank votes	111	0.20
Total votes	55,372	100.00
Registered voters and turnout	—	—
Source (Note: Neither the registered voters nor the turnout figures were published.)

=== Second investiture attempt ===
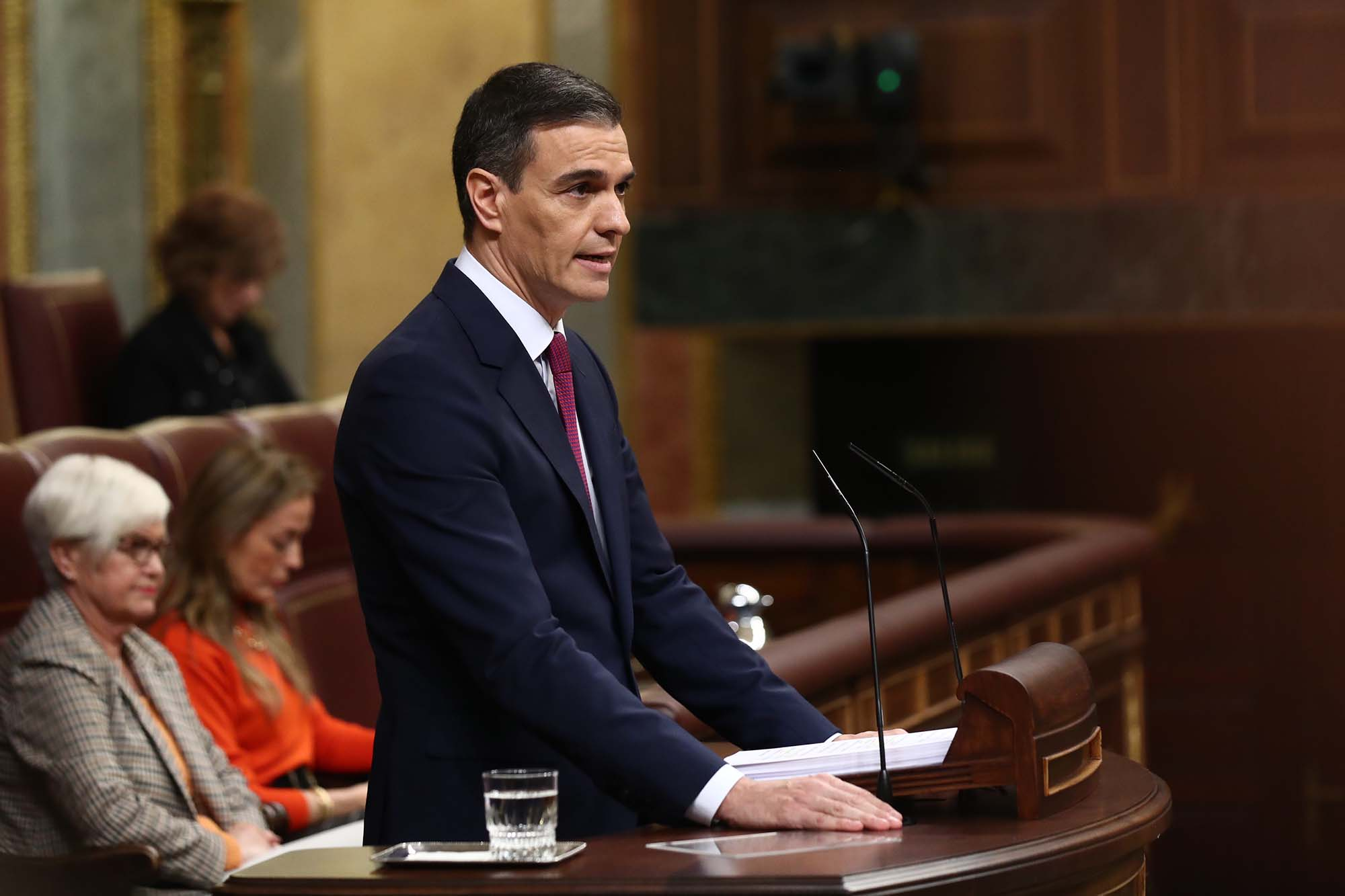
Pedro Sánchez during the first day of debate on his investiture on 15 November 2023.

Pedro Sánchez's investiture debate began at 12:00 CET (UTC+1) on 15 November with Sánchez's speech, followed by the replies of all other parties. The first round of voting was on 16 November. A second round of voting, which was ultimately not required, would have taken place on 18 November.

During the debate, Feijóo attacked Sánchez over the amnesty and his concessions to pro-independence parties, accusing him of "political corruption". During his initial address to parliament he also attempted to undermine Sánchez by accusing him of cutting off a quotation from a poem by Antonio Machado; it was later established that Feijóo's allegedly complete Machado quotation was in fact a much later adaptation of the poem written by songwriter Ismael Serrano. Also during the debate, Madrilenian president Ayuso—who attended as a visitor—was filmed in the chamber's gallery mouthing the Spanish words for "son of a bitch" after Sánchez mentioned the corruption allegations against her brother that brought about the downfall of former PP leader Pablo Casado. Feijóo's position was weakened following a remark by PNV spokesman Aitor Esteban, in which he denounced the former's criticism of Sánchez's agreement by commenting that "someday maybe I will get to say what [Feijóo] offered us" in exchange for PNV support to his investiture. Subsequently, El Diario Vasco reported that Feijóo had offered the PNV the Industry ministry "and more" during failed negotiations in August–September.

Vox leader Santiago Abascal demanded a repeat election, claiming that the investiture agreements "had not been voted at the polls", comparing Sánchez to Adolf Hitler and accusing him of staging a "coup d'état". On the other hand, Junts spokesperson Míriam Nogueras, while pledging her party's support to Sánchez's investiture, warned him: "Don't push your luck with us because it won't work for you. Your speech wasn't brave." In an incident outdoors, PSOE deputy Herminio Sancho—who had been a brief protagonist during Feijóo's failed investiture as a result of a voting mistake—was hit by an egg after several people heckled him along with three other PSOE MPs who were accompanying him.

Investiture; Congress of Deputies; Nomination of Pedro Sánchez (PSOE)
Ballot →	16 November 2023
Required majority →	176 out of 350
Yes: • PSOE (121); • Sumar (31); • ERC (7); • Junts (7); • EH Bildu (6); • PNV (5); • BNG (1); • CCa (1)	179 / 350
No: • PP (137); • Vox (33); • UPN (1)	171 / 350
Abstentions	0 / 350
Absentees	0 / 350

Pedro Sánchez was elected by an absolute majority in the first round of voting on 16 November, with more support than he received in 2020: 179 votes as opposed to 167, coming from Sánchez's own party, the PSOE, as well as Sumar, ERC, Junts, EH Bildu, PNV, BNG and CCa. Sánchez asserted the legitimacy of his investiture and emphasized that it would produce a "legitimate, democratic and constitutional" government, while Feijóo approached to shake his hand muttering that "this is a mistake".

== Opinion polls ==
Opinion polls were conducted during the term of the 14th Cortes Generales and throughout the investiture processes to gauge public opinion on the preferred composition of the government resulting from the 2023 general election. These polls mostly indicated that the most popular option was a repetition of the ruling PSOE–Sumar coalition, either with or without an explicit support from peripheral nationalist parties, whereas the second most-preferred choice varied between a PP–Vox alliance or a PP–PSOE grand coalition. Shown in reverse chronological order, with the most recent first and using the dates when the survey fieldwork was done, as opposed to the date of publication (except in cases where the fieldwork dates are unknown):

Opinion on government formation
Polling firm/Commissioner	Fieldwork date	Sample size	PSOE UP/ Sumar	PSOE	PP PSOE	PP	PP Vox	Other	None/ New election	Question	Notes
Sigma Dos/Antena 3	4–11 Oct 2023	1,440	–	–	32.9 (Note: 22.5% PP–PSOE grand coalition; 10.4% PP–PSOE agreement, two-year term for each political party.)	–	–	–	61.9	5.1	(Note: Question asked was "If Pedro Sánchez were unable to secure the confidence of Congress to serve once again as Prime Minister, which of the following options would be your preferred choice?")
40dB/Prisa	29 Sept–2 Oct 2023	2,000	29.8	–	11.1	–	–	–	48.2	10.9	(Note: Question asked was "After the failed attempt to invest Alberto Núñez Feijóo as Prime Minister, (...) what do you prefer to happen?")
40dB/Prisa	25–28 Aug 2023	2,000	33.2	9.8	–	13.1	16.0	–	17.9	9.9	(Note: Question asked was "As you know, at this time, the different parties represented in Congress must negotiate who will be sworn in as prime minister as none of them have obtained an absolute majority. Which of the following formulas would be your favorite one?")
Simple Lógica/elDiario.es	31 Jul–7 Aug 2023	1,098	40.4	–	3.1	14.0	9.4	3.9	24.5	4.7	(Note: Question asked was "How do you prefer the investiture to be resolved?")
	23 Jun 2023	2023 Spanish general election									
GESOP/Prensa Ibérica	13–15 Jul 2023	1,200	37.8	–	28.7	–	21.2	0.5	–	11.8	(Note: Question asked was "Which of the following government coalitions would you prefer?")
Target Point/El Debate	3–7 Jul 2023	1,020	26.0 (Note: 16.0% PSOE–Sumar–Regionalists; 10.0% PSOE–Sumar–Regionalists–Nationalists.)	–	6.0	16.0	15.0 (Note: 14.0% PP–Vox; 1.0% PP–Vox–Regionalists; 0.0% PP–Vox–Regionalists–Nationalists.)	7.0	–	17.0	
Sigma Dos/Antena 3	23 Jun–3 Jul 2023	2,880	29.5	12.3	15.9	8.7	23.5	–	–	10.1	(Note: Question asked was "If, following the 23 July election, no political party secures a sufficient majority to govern alone, which potential coalition agreement would you most favor?")
GAD3/NIUS	27–28 Jun 2023	1,005	22.0	17.6	7.8	26.4	11.6	5.3	2.4	6.9	(Note: Question asked was "If you could choose, overall, which government type would you prefer to govern?")
40dB/Prisa	23–26 Jun 2023	2,000	25.7	14.1	9.8	17.1	16.7	–	6.6	9.9	(Note: Question asked was "And, overall, which government would you prefer to preside over Spain after this general election?")
40dB/Prisa	12–14 Jun 2023	2,000	23.5	12.3	11.5	17.2	16.9	–	7.2	11.5	
GESOP/Prensa Ibérica	30 May–1 Jun 2023	1,003	32.8	–	31.9	–	22.7	3.1	4.8	4.8	
40dB/Prisa	23–26 Nov 2022	2,000	34.1	16.5	15.9	17.1	16.4	–	–	–	(Note: Question asked was "And, overall, which government do you think would be best for Spain?")
Sigma Dos/Antena 3	16 Oct 2022	?	27.8	–	17.3	–	27.2	8.2	12.1	7.4	(Note: Question asked was "In the event that, in the next general election, no political party achieves an absolute majority to govern, what pact or government coalition would you prefer?")
GESOP/Prensa Ibérica	20–22 Jun 2022	1,001	30.0	–	33.8	–	17.1	–	13.0	6.2	(Note: Question asked was "Which coalition do you regard as best to govern Spain?")
EM-Analytics/Electomanía	28 May–2 Jun 2022	1,124	41.9	–	18.5	–	39.6	–	–	–	(Note: Question asked was "If no political party were to obtain a sufficient majority to govern alone, which coalition would you prefer?")

== Aftermath ==
=== Government instability ===
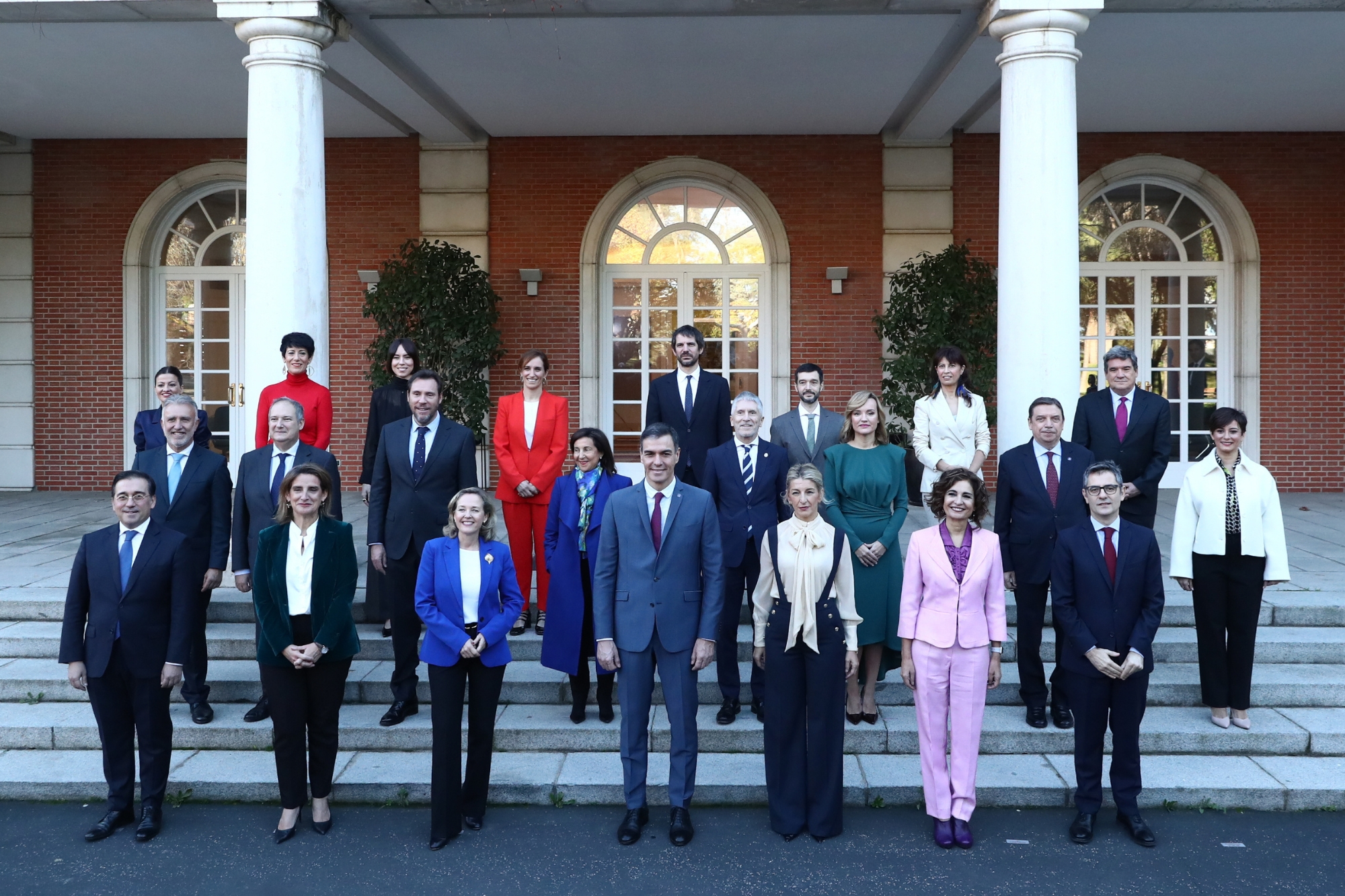
Cabinet photo of Pedro Sánchez's third government on 22 November 2023.

Sánchez's re-election ended a 116-day stalemate in government formation, which was considerably shorter than previous stalemates in 2015–2016 (314 days) and 2019–2020 (254 days). It was also the first time since 2011 that no repeat election was needed, as well as the first time since that year that an investiture succeeded in the first round of voting. As a result, Sánchez went on to form his third cabinet, a new coalition between the PSOE and Sumar without any members from Podemos.

This government proved unstable due to complicated parliamentary arithmetics; its reliance on Junts's support to pass legislation in the Congress, as well as the PP's absolute majority in the Senate, meant that many of its initiatives died in the parliament, and others did not have many votes to spare. By April 2025, the government had suffered over 100 parliamentary defeats, including three decree-laws, five bill proposals, as well as numerous amendments and motions and the successful reproval of two ministers by the opposition. A record was set on 19 December 2024 with 20 votes lost by the government in a single day. The parliamentary deadlock also affected the approval of the 2025 budget, which had to be delayed until enough support could be secured.

The hypothesis of a motion of no confidence on Sánchez's government that received the support of PP, Vox and Junts—a combination that would garner the required minimum of 176 votes for it to pass—was commented by the media and considered by PP's leaders, with Vox voicing its support to such an initiative in January 2025. However, Junts repeteadly rejected this possibility, proposing instead that Sánchez voluntarily submit to a vote of confidence but without breaking up relations with the PSOE. In October 2025, Junts withdrew its support from the government over its alleged failure to deliver on key commitments (with Catalonia's shifting political landscape and the rise of far-right Catalan Alliance being widely blamed for the move), but Sánchez was able to remain in office due to the lack of a viable parliamentary majority for a vote of no confidence.

=== Inside stories of negotiations ===
Following PNV spokesperson Aitor Esteban's statements in parliament about Feijóo's negotiations during the summer of 2023, PNV leaders warned that they would not reveal what Feijóo offered them "unless [the PP] bother us". Esteban acknowledged that "there were no negotiations, but everyone knows [PP leaders] were very insistent in wanting to meet with us (...) and they also made persistent phone calls. And during the calls, if someone wants to convince the other, offers are made, and there were offers that were eye-catching". Several media had revealed that among the PP's offerings were a proposal of a coalition government with the PNV being given the Industry ministry, important economic investments for the Basque Country and a relevant role in dialogue with a prospective Feijóo government. While the PP rejected these claims, PNV sources privately confirmed that the offer included this "and more", the precise scope of which not being disclosed.

On 24 November 2023, a mere week after Sánchez's successful investiture, the PNV announced that Iñigo Urkullu would not repeat as the party's candidate for lehendakari ahead of the 2024 Basque regional election. Among the reasons cited behind the move were a perceived need to politicize the party's position away from Urkullu's more pragmatic manners in order to tackle EH Bildu's rise in opinion polls, but also because Urkullu's affinity to Feijóo had led him to advocate for an agreement with the latter that was contrary to the party's official stance during government negotiations. A then-unknown Imanol Pradales would be proposed as candidate in January, who would end up winning the Basque election and becoming new lehendakari through an alliance with the PSOE's regional branch.

Puigdemont published a letter on 8 February 2024 linking the terrorism indictment against him to his party not allowing Feijóo's investiture or blocking Sánchez's, issuing a veiled threat that "everything will be known". In the next days, Feijóo acknowledged that Junts had offered him their support during the summer of 2023 in exchange of the amnesty and that the PP had studied the proposal for 24 hours before rejecting it as unconstitutional; however, he also hinted at a pardon for Puigdemont if the latter's party "came back to legality". These revelations were met with criticism from several ministers in Sánchez's government. Aznar's Majestic Pact with Convergence and Union and the PNV in 1996 was frequently recalled by Sánchez's supporters, but also by Vox, to denounce hypocrisy in the PP's rhetoric.

=== Amnesty law significance ===
The amnesty law proposal was reported as playing an important role in deactivating support for independence in Catalonia, with pro-independence parties losing their overall parliamentary majority—for the first time in 40 years—at the 12 May 2024 regional election, leading to PSC's Salvador Illa becoming new Catalan president and to the culmination of Sánchez's goal to deflate tensions in the region following the 2017–2018 crisis. After approval, the enforcement of the amnesty itself would remain deadlocked in the courts due to differing interpretations on its constitutionality and application, thwarting Puigdemont's plans and forcing him to evade Spanish and Catalan police forces in order to stage a brief appearance in Barcelona during Illa's investiture.

Protests against Sánchez's investiture and amnesty, frequently called or supported by PP and Vox, lasted into 2024. These began declining after several months and ultimately failed to achieve either of their main objectives of preventing the law's approval or forcing the government to dissolve parliament and call a snap general election.
