= Catalan Declaration of Sovereignty =

Results of the votes for the "Declaration of sovereignty" at the Catalan Parliament, on 23 January 2013

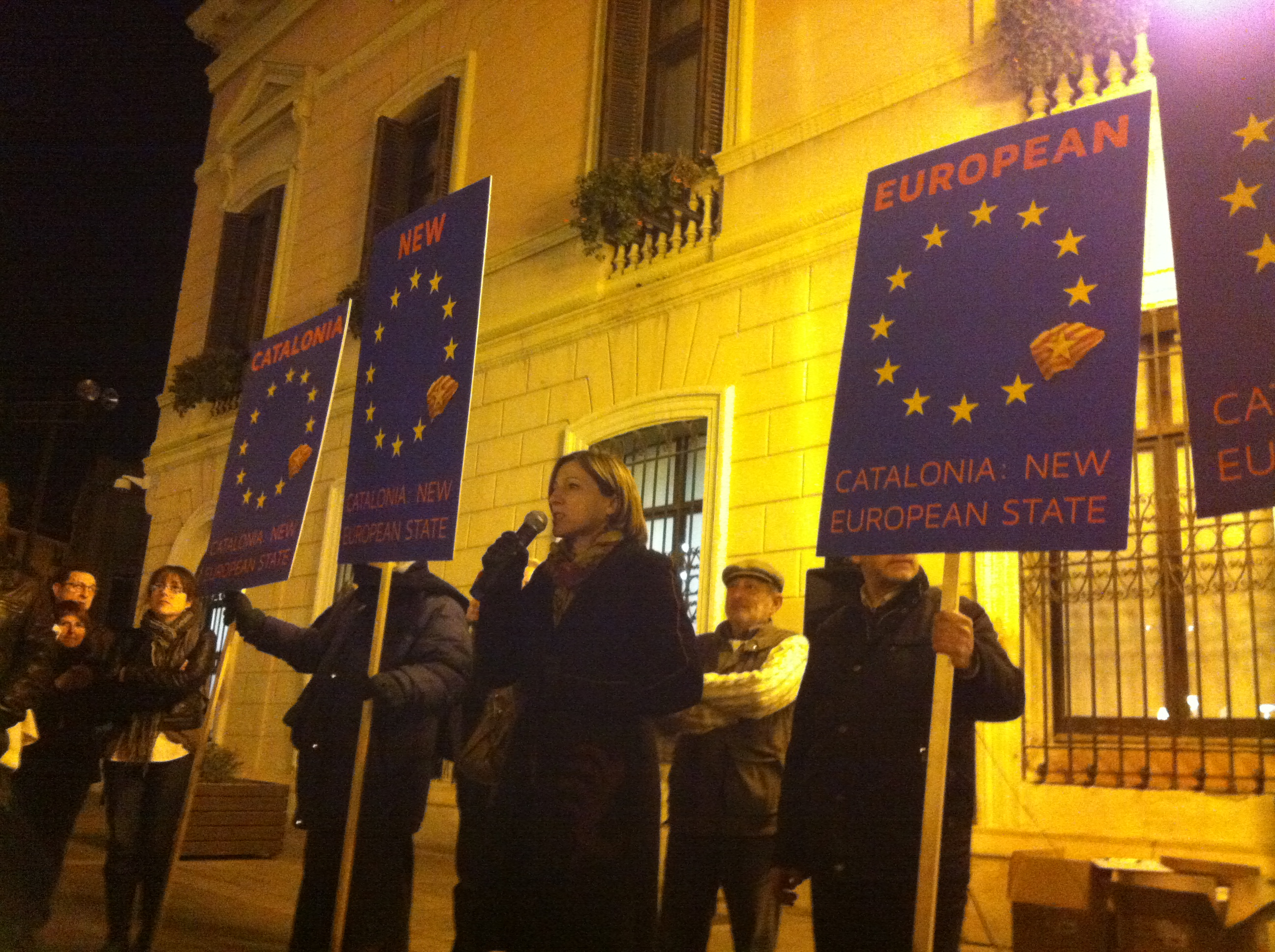
Celebration in Sabadell of the Catalan Sovereignty Declaration on 23 January

The Declaration on the Sovereignty and Right to Decide of the People of Catalonia (Catalan: Declaració de sobirania i el dret a decidir del poble de Catalunya) was issued on 23 January 2013. The declaration asserted that Catalonia is an autonomous entity and agrees "to initiate the process to exercise the right to decide so that the citizens of Catalonia may decide their collective political future in accordance with the following principles: democratic legitimacy, transparency, dialogue, social cohesion, Europeanism, legality, role of the Catalan Parliament and participation". The declaration was passed with 85 votes in favor, 41 against and 2 abstentions in the Parliament of Catalonia.

On 8 May 2013 this declaration was provisionally suspended by the Constitutional Court of Spain. On 25 March 2014, the same court declared the principle of sovereignty void and not constitutional and validated the other principles.

== See also ==
- Catalan independence
- Catalan self-determination referendum
- History of Catalonia
- Sovereignty
- Ibarretxe Plan
