= Opinion polling on Catalan independence =

This page lists public opinion polls that have been conducted in relation to the issue of Catalan independence.

== Polling institutions ==
=== Centre for Opinion Studies ===
The Centre for Opinion Studies (Centre d'Estudis d'Opinió; CEO) fell under the purview of the Economy Ministry of the Generalitat of Catalonia until early 2011. Since then it has been placed under direct control of the Presidency of the Generalitat and is currently headed by Jordi Argelaguet i Argemí. Since the second quarter of 2011, CEO has conducted polls regarding public sentiments toward independence.

Date	In favor (%)	Against (%)	Others (%)	Abstain (%)	Do not know (%)	Did not reply (%)
2011 2nd series	42.9	28.2	0.5	23.3	4.4	0.8
2011 3rd series	45.4	24.7	0.6	23.8	4.6	1.0
2012 1st series	44.6	24.7	1.0	24.2	4.6	0.9
2012 2nd series	51.1	21.1	1.0	21.1	4.7	1.1
2012 3rd series	57.0	20.5	0.6	14.3	6.2	1.5
2013 1st series	54.7	20.7	1.1	17.0	5.4	1.0
2013 2nd series	55.6	23.4	0.6	15.3	3.8	1.3
2013 3rd series	54.7	22.1	1.3	15.7	4.9	1.4
2014 1st series^{a}	-	-	-	-	-	-
2014 2nd series	44.5	45.3	-	-	7.5	2.8
2015 1st series	44.1	48.0	-	-	6.0	1.8
2015 2nd series	42.9	50.0	-	-	5.8	1.3
2015 3rd series	46.7	47.8	-	-	3.9	1.7
2016 1st series	45.3	45.5	-	-	7.1	2.1
2016 2nd series	47.7	42.4	-	-	8.3	1.7
2016 3rd series	44.9	45.1	-	-	7.0	2.9
2017 1st series	44.3	48.5	-	-	5.6	1.6
2017 2nd series	41.1	49.4	-	-	7.8	1.7
2017 3rd series	48.7	43.6	-	-	6.5	1.3
2018 1st series	48.0	43.7	-	-	5.7	2.6
2018 2nd series	46.7	44.9	-	-	6.7	1.6
2019 1st series	48.4	44.1	-	-	6.7	1.6
2019 2nd series	44.0	48.3	-	-	5.5	2.1
2019 3rd series	43.7	47.9	-	-	6.5	1.9
2020 1st series	44.9	47.1	-	-	6.5	1.6
2020 2nd series	42.0	50.5	-	-	5.6	1.9
2020 3rd series	43.6	49.0	-	-	5.8	1.6
2021^{b}	-	-	-	-	-	-
2022 1st series	44	48	-	-	-	-
2022 2nd series	41	52	-	-	-	-
2022 3rd series	42	50	-	-	-	-
2023 1st series	43	50	-	-	-	-
2023 2nd series	42	52	-	-	-	-
2023 3rd series	41	52	-	-	-	-
2024 1st series	42	51	-	-	-	-
2024 2nd series	40	53	-	-	-	-
2024 3rd series	40	54	-	-	-	-
2025 1st series	38	54	-	-	-	-
2025 2nd series	40	52	-	-	-	-
2025 3rd series	39	53	-	-	-	-
June 2026 series	45	51	-	-	-	-

^{a} The question was not asked in this survey; instead the two part question was asked (see below).

^{b} Unlike the other polls, this one was conducted via Computer-Assisted Telephone Interview and is excluded in other CEO barometers.

CEO likewise conducted polls in the 1st and 2nd series of 2014 based on the 9N independence referendum format. The questions and choices involved were:

- Do you want Catalonia to become a State? (Yes/No)
- If the answer for question 1 is in the affirmative: Do you want this State to be independent? (Yes/No)

Date	Yes + Yes (%)	Yes + No (%)	No (%)	Abstain (%)	Others (%)	Do not know/Did not reply (%)
2014 1st series	47.1	8.6	19.3	11.1	2.7	11.2
2014 2nd series	49.4	12.6	19.7	6.9	6.2	3.3

In addition, CEO performs regular polls studying opinion of Catalan citizens regarding Catalonia's political status within Spain. The following table contains the answers to the question "Which kind of political entity should Catalonia be with respect to Spain?":

Date	Independent state (%)	Federal state within Spain (%)	Autonomous community within Spain (%)	Region within Spain (%)	Do not know (%)	Did not reply (%)
June 2005	13.6	31.3	40.8	7.0	6.2	1.1
November 2005	12.9	35.8	37.6	5.6	6.9	1.2
March 2006	13.9	33.4	38.2	8.1	5.1	1.2
July 2006	14.9	34.1	37.3	6.9	6.1	0.7
October 2006	14.0	32.9	38.9	8.3	5.1	0.8
November 2006	15.9	32.8	40.0	6.8	3.7	0.8
March 2007	14.5	35.3	37.0	6.1	4.9	2.2
July 2007	16.9	34.0	37.3	5.5	5.4	1.0
October 2007	18.5	34.2	35.0	4.7	6.0	1.5
December 2007	17.3	33.8	37.8	5.1	5.0	1.0
January 2008	19.4	36.4	34.8	3.8	4.1	1.6
May 2008	17.6	33.4	38.9	5.1	4.3	0.7
July 2008	16.1	34.7	37.0	6.1	5.2	0.9
November 2008	17.4	31.8	38.3	7.1	4.2	1.2
February 2009	16.1	35.2	38.6	4.5	3.6	2.0
May 2009	20.9	35.0	34.9	4.4	3.0	1.7
July 2009	19.0	32.2	36.8	6.2	4.2	1.6
December 2009	21.6	29.9	36.9	5.9	4.1	1.6
2010 1st series	19.4	29.5	38.2	6.9	4.4	1.6
2010 2nd series	21.5	31.2	35.2	7.3	4.0	0.7
2010 3rd series	24.3	31.0	33.3	5.4	4.9	1.0
2010 4th series	25.2	30.9	34.7	5.9	2.7	0.7
2011 1st series	24.5	31.9	33.2	5.6	3.5	1.3
2011 2nd series	25.5	33.0	31.8	5.6	3.4	0.8
2011 3rd series	28.2	30.4	30.3	5.7	3.9	1.5
2012 1st series	29.0	30.8	27.8	5.2	5.4	1.8
2012 2nd series	34.0	28.7	25.4	5.7	5.0	1.3
2012 3rd series	44.3	25.5	19.1	4.0	4.9	2.2
2013 1st series	46.4	22.4	20.7	4.4	4.9	1.2
2013 2nd series	47.0	21.2	22.8	4.6	3.5	0.9
2013 3rd series	48.5	21.3	18.6	5.4	4.0	2.2
2014 1st series	45.2	20.0	23.3	2.6	6.9	2.0
2014 2nd series	45.3	22.2	23.4	1.8	6.5	0.9
2015 1st series	39.1	26.1	24.0	3.4	5.3	2.0
2015 2nd series	37.6	24.0	29.3	4.0	3.9	1.1
2015 3rd series	41.1	22.2	27.4	3.7	4.2	1.4
2016 1st series	38.5	26.3	25.1	4.1	4.5	1.5
2016 2nd series	41.6	20.9	26.5	4.0	5.6	1.3
2016 3rd series	38.9	23.2	24.1	5.7	N/A	N/A
2016 4th series	36.1	29.2	23.6	4.5	3.4	3.2
2017 1st series	37.3	21.7	28.5	7.0	3.8	1.6
2017 2nd series	34.7	21.7	30.5	5.3	6.1	1.7
2017 3rd series	40.2	21.9	27.4	4.6	4.7	1.2
2018 1st series	40.8	22.4	24.0	6.3	4.6	2.0
2018 2nd series	38.8	22.4	25.5	7.8	4.4	1.1
2019 1st series	39.7	21.5	26.3	5.9	4.7	1.9
2019 2nd series	34.5	24.5	27.0	7.8	4.6	1.6
2019 3rd series	36.7	21.7	28.0	5.9	5.8	1.8
2020 1st series	35.5	23.9	26.8	6.5	5.5	1.7
2020 2nd series	33.9	22.9	29.6	6.8	5.2	1.7
2020 3rd series	34.9	22.6	28.0	6.4	6.0	2.1
2021	-	-	-	-	-	-
2022 1st series	35	23	28	6	-	-
2022 2nd series	34	21	30	8	-	-
2022 3rd series	33	20	29	8	-	-
2023 1st series	33	23	32	6	-	-
2023 2nd series	33	23	31	7	-	-
2023 3rd series	31	24	31	6	-	-
2024 1st series	31	23	31	9	-	-
2024 2nd series	31	22	34	7	-	-
2024 3rd series	30	22	34	6	-	-
2025 1st series	28	22	36	8	-	-
2025 2nd series	32	22	32	7	-	-
2025 3rd series	31	23	33	6	-	-
June 2026 series	36	22	30	7	-	-

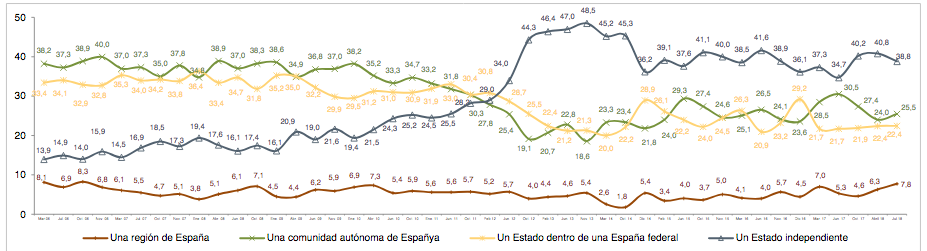

=== Social and Political Sciences Institute of Barcelona ===
The Political Sciences Institute of Barcelona (Institut de Ciències Polítiques i Socials; ICPS) performed an opinion poll annually from 1989, which sometimes included a section on independence. The results are in the following table:

Year	Support (%)	Against (%)	Indifferent (%)	Did not reply (%)
1991	35	50	11	4
1992	31	53	11	5
1993	37	50	9	5
1994	35	49	14	3
1995	36	52	10	3
1996	29	56	11	4
1997	32	52	11	5
1998	32	55	10	3
1999	32	55	10	3
2000	32	53	13	3
2001	33	55	11	1
2002	34	52	12	1
2003^{[a]}	43	43	12	1
2004^{[a]}	39	44	13	3
2005	36	44	15	6
2006	33	48	17	2
2007	31.7	51.3	14.1	2.9
2011	41.4	22.9	26.5	9.2

^{a} telephonic instead of door-to-door interview

== Newspaper polls ==
Catalan newspapers El Periódico and La Vanguardia also published surveys up to 2013.

El Periódico

Date	Yes (%)	No (%)	Others (%)
October 2007	33.9	43.9	22.3
December 2009	39.0	40.6	20.4
June 2010	48.1	35.5	16.6
January 2012	53.6	32.0	14.4
September 2012	46.4	22.0	25.7
November 2012	50.9	36.9	12.2
November 2012^{[a]}	40.1	47.8	12.1
May 2013	57.8	36.0	6.3

^{a} The same poll, but asking what would be the case if a yes vote would imply leaving the EU

La Vanguardia

Date	Yes (%)	No (%)	Others (%)
November 2009	35	46	19
March 2010	36	44	20
May 2010	37	41	22
July 2010	47	36	17
September 2010	40	45	15
April 2011	34	30	35
September 2012	54.8	33.5	10.16
December 2013	44.9	45	10.1
