= 2008 Basque status referendum attempt =

Planned referendum of self-determination

A referendum concerning Basque Country's self-determination from Spain was intended to occur in 2008, but was prevented by the Supreme Court of Spain at the instigation of the Spanish Government.

The 2008 referendum was proposed by former lehendakari (president of the Basque country autonomous community) Juan José Ibarretxe. The poll was to be a consultative, rather than binding, referendum, in which two questions were put to the electorate. The first question was to concern whether to engage in talks with ETA; the second was to be on whether there should be a political debate on the "right to decide about the Basque people", a coded reference to the issue of Basque Country independence.

It was scheduled for 25 October 2008, but the Spanish government challenged the decision to hold the vote in the Constitutional Court of Spain, which ruled on 11 September 2008 that the referendum call was against the law. In turn, the PNV (Basque Nationalist Party) appealed against this ruling, to the European Court of Human Rights, which later upheld the Spanish Constitutional Court ruling in February 2010.

== Creation ==
The referendum-like vote was announced on 28 September 2007 by Juan José Ibarretxe, with the support of the three-party coalition that made up his government: the Basque Nationalist Party (Ibarretxe's own), Eusko Alkartasuna and Ezker Batua Berdeak. The lone Aralar MP also supported the call while the Basque branches of both Spanish Socialist Workers' Party and conservative People's Party rejected it. This made a 33-33 tie at the Basque regional Parliament.

On 27 June 2008, the referendum call was approved by the Basque Parliament narrowly by 34 to 33, and 7 abstentions. To break the existing 33 to 33 vote tie at the Basque autonomous Parliament, the referendum call received the tactical support of one of the EHAK MPs, considered by a Basque PP councillor as ETA's political arm, while the other 7 MPs of this party abstained.

Ibarretxe preferred to call the vote a "consultation" rather than a referendum and stated he would negotiate its terms with the Spanish central government until June 2008 and then would submit a possible mutually accepted plan to a binding referendum; should the negotiations fail. Ibarretxe stated he would hold a non-binding referendum on the future of the Basque Country. Eventually in his plans, if his coalition still held the government, another referendum in 2010 would then decide the final status of the Basque Country. Ibarretxe stated he believes an open-ended discussion on Basque independence would help to end the conflict with ETA.

The two questions were revealed on 28 May 2008. The questions proposed were:

First

¿Está usted de acuerdo en apoyar un proceso de final dialogado de la violencia, si previamente ETA manifiesta de forma inequívoca su voluntad de poner fin a la misma de una vez y para siempre?.

Do you agree to supporting a process of dialogued end to the violence, if ETA previously declares unmistakably their will to end it once and for all?

Second

¿Está usted de acuerdo en que los partidos vascos, sin exclusiones, inicien un proceso de negociación para alcanzar un acuerdo democrático sobre el ejercicio del derecho a decidir del Pueblo Vasco, y que dicho acuerdo sea sometido a referéndum antes de que finalice el año 2010?

Do you agree that the Basque parties, without exceptions, start a process of negotiation to reach a democratic agreement about the right to decide of the Basque People, and that the aforementioned agreement will be submitted to referendum before the end of the year 2010?

Those eligible to vote were the Spanish citizens registered to vote in the Basque Country. That caused criticism from those advocating for the referendum to include the historical Basque territories and those who asked for it to include all of Spain.

== Reactions ==
The Spanish Socialist Workers' Party and the People's Party, including their Basque branches, rejected his plan, while regional nationalist parties such as the Galician Nationalist Bloc and the Republican Left of Catalonia expressed their support. The Basque MP Santiago Abascal, of the People's Party, caused a minor controversy at the regional parliament when he broke a piece of paper symbolising the referendum, arguing that Ibarretxe's project would break the Basque society, further dividing it.

Some within the Basque Nationalist Party itself opposed the referendum, since it was thought to strengthen ETA which at that point was declining. This part of the party included former party leader Josu Jon Imaz or Bilbao's mayor Iñaki Azkuna, who thought that the referendum should not be held while ETA were still active and without a general consensus to hold it in the first place.

ETA in a communique declared the referendum a fraud, still, there was speculation in El País, citing undefined "nationalist sources", that ETA would declare a temporary, tactical and unofficial halt to armed activities in the period when the referendum was being discussed at the Basque autonomous parliament, only to resume its attacks right after the referendum was appealed by the government before the Constitutional Court of Spain for a constitutionality check.

== Constitutional Court ==
The Spanish government appealed the vote to the Constitutional Court of Spain, thus suspending the referendum plans. The suspension occurred on 17 July 2008.

The Court ruled unanimously on 11 September 2008 that the referendum was unconstitutional, as only the central government could call such a referendum. In a ruling fraught with statements of clear political overtones, the Spanish court ruled that only Spain's central government could conduct referendums, as representative of the only rightful sovereignty holder, "the Spanish People" and "the Spanish Nation". It also establishes that the issue the Basque Government wanted to raise, the possibility of changing the Basque Autonomous Community's relationship with the rest of Spain, is something the Spanish would have to decide on, not Basques on their own. The ruling at no time acknowledges the existence of the Basques, who are quoted in reported style (claimed by the appellant), as opposed to the Spanish nation.

Ibarretxe declared he respected the court ruling, while adding that the court was "acting for political reasons disguised in a legal veneer". He subsequently called on the Basque people and its political parties to appeal to the European Court of Human Rights to take Spain to task over the court decision.

=== European Court of Human Rights ===
Following the PNV's (Basque Nationalist Party) appeal, in February 2010 the European Court of Human Rights upheld the Spanish Constitutional Court ruling, ruling that the Spanish government had not violated the European Convention on Human Rights.

== Support ==
On the day the vote was to have taken place, Saturday October 25, 2008, some 20,000 protesters rallied in six Basque cities demanding a referendum on proposed moves towards independence. It was intended that the vote would have allowed for a potential negotiation towards a full referendum on independence within two years. The vote followed Kosovo's declaration of independence, supported by the EU, which had been thought by some to be influential on an independent Basque Country. Furthermore, calls for a referendum on Scottish independence in 2010 were in line with the Basque case.

== See also ==
- 2014 Catalan self-determination referendum
- 2017 Catalan independence referendum
- Ibarretxe Plan
