= Ibarretxe Plan =

Proposed reforms to the status of Basque Country within Spain

The Political Statute of the Community of the Basque Country, better known as the Ibarretxe Plan was a proposal by former lehendakari Juan Jose Ibarretxe to totally reform the Statute of Autonomy of the Basque Country by proposing a free association of the Basque Country with Spain on an equal footing, including a right to self-determination.

Inspired by Puerto Rico's status with the United States, as well as the sovereignty-association of the Parti Québécois with Canada has been cited as a reference.

A debate on the plan was rejected by the Spanish Parliament and subsequently replaced by Ibarretxe's proposed Basque referendum, 2008.

== Forging and demise ==
The plan was announced by the former lehendakari (the President of the Basque region) Juan Jose Ibarretxe in September 2001 in a plenary of the Basque parliament but the actual contents of the proposal were not made public until July 2003, when leaked to the press. It was officially presented on October 25, 2003. The Basque Parliament' plenary approved it on 30 December 2004 by 39 votes with 35 against.

The plan would have affected the Spanish Constitution, so the proposal was sent to the Spanish Parliament in January 2005 for debate ahead of a vote. The two main Spanish parties, the Socialists and the Conservatives, attempted to block the Basque parliament's decision by challenging it in the Constitutional Court, which approved the draft project for Spanish parliamentary consideration by a narrow margin.

Despite its majority support within the Region, the Ibarretxe Plan was not allowed to be considered for discussion in Congress on February 1, 2005, with 313 voting against debating it (PSOE, PP, IU, Canarian Coalition and CHA), while 29 voted for it (PNV, ERC, CiU, EA, Na-Bai and BNG), and 2 abstentions (IC-V).

Basque nationalist parties, as a whole, do not accept the legitimacy of the 1978 Spanish Constitution regarding the Basque Autonomous Community and Navarre (Southern Basque Country), which received no input from the Basques. Despite numerically winning the poll, abstention and spoiled ballots outnumbered the "Yes" ballots in the territory.

== Content ==
Under the plan, the two million people in this northern region would remain Spanish citizens but divided into two overlapping categories of Basques, defined as "citizens" and "nationals".

The plan provided for the Basque regional government's right to call referendums, opening the door to a possible future vote on independence, while removing a Spanish government right to suspend the regional government's powers.

== Alleged objections ==
The Spanish Government, led by the Spanish Socialist Workers' Party premier José Luis Rodríguez Zapatero, and leading Spanish academics viewed the Ibarretxe Plan as contrary to the Spanish Constitution, this view being shared by the main opposition party Partido Popular.

The European Parliament refused to have anything to do with the plan, saying that it was a Spanish internal issue.

== Subsequent proposals ==
Two years after the proposal was discarded, Ibarretxe proposed a similar initiative under a referendum-like vote.

== See also ==
- Basque Country independence
