= Judges for Democracy =

Judges for Democracy (Spanish: Jueces para la Democracia, JpD) is one of the five Spanish professional associations of judges and magistrates. It was founded by Juan Alberto Belloch. Since judges and magistrates in Spain are barred from joining class trade unions, professional associations are intended to protect the rights and interests of judges and magistrates. JpD is considered to be the third association by size and ideologically progressive.

== See also ==
- Spanish Judiciary
- General Council of the Judicial Power of Spain
- Professional Association of Magistrates
- Francisco de Vitoria Association
