= Professional Association of Magistrates =

Spanish organization

The Professional Association of Magistrates (Spanish: Asociación Profesional de la Magistratura) is one of the five Spanish, professional associations of judges and magistrates. Since judges and magistrates in Spain are barred from joining trade unions, professional associations such as APM have adopted the traditional union role of protecting their employment rights and conditions. APM is the biggest professional association of judges and magistrates in Spain and is considered to be ideologically conservative.

== See also ==
- Spanish Judiciary
- General Council of the Judicial Power of Spain
- Judges for Democracy
- Francisco de Vitoria Association
