= 2014 Catalan self-determination referendum =

Referendum in the Spanish region of Catalonia

- 9 November 2014
- Do you want Catalonia to become a state? In case of affirmative answer, do you want this state to become independent?
- Map of the Yes–Yes vote share by vegueria: 60% 65% 70% 75% 80% 85% 90% 95%
- Website: participa2014.cat

Results
Yes–Yes	80.76%
Yes–No	10.07%
Yes–Blank	0.97%
No	4.54%
Blank	0.56%

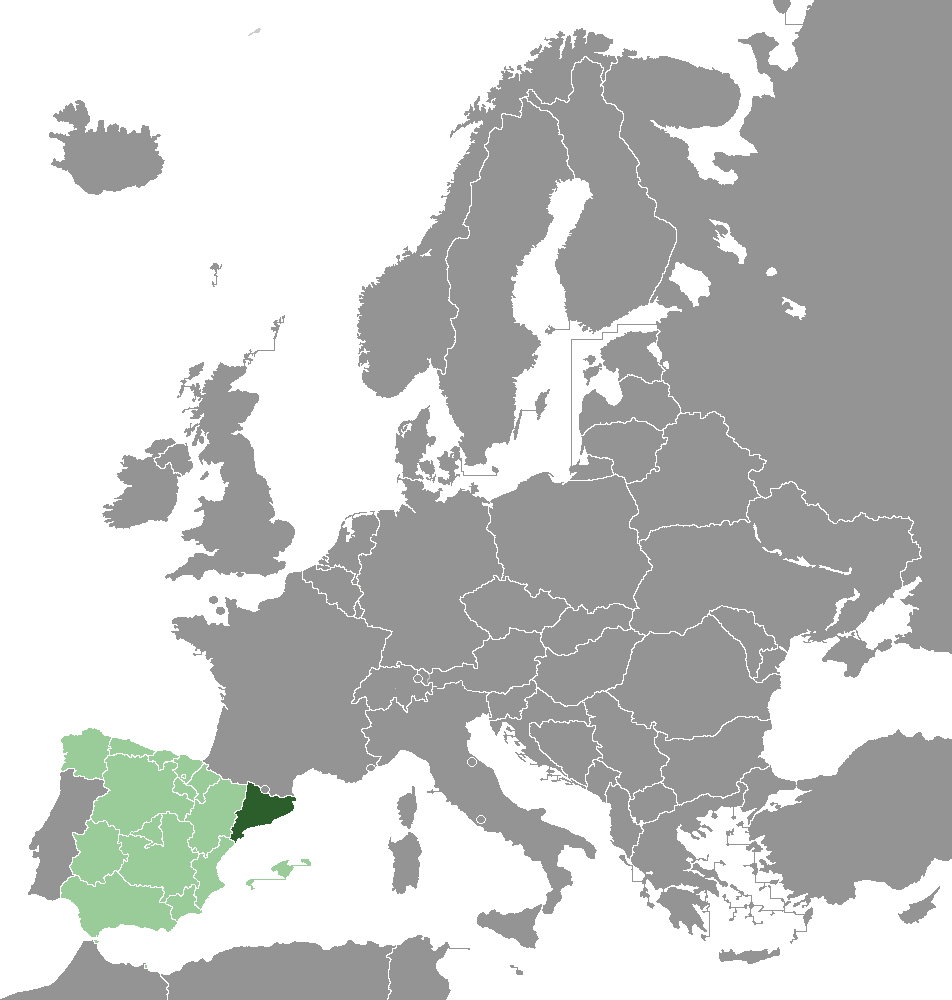
Location of Catalonia (dark green) in Spain (light green) and Europe.

A non-binding Catalan self-determination referendum, also known as the Citizen Participation Process on the Political Future of Catalonia, was held on Sunday, 9 November 2014, to gauge support on the political future of Catalonia. While also referred to as "Catalan independence referendum", the vote was rebranded as a "participation process" by the Government of Catalonia, after a "non-referendum popular consultation" on the same topic and for the same date had been suspended by the Constitutional Court of Spain.

The ballot papers carried two questions: "Do you want Catalonia to become a State?" and "Do you want this State to be independent?" The second question could only be answered by those who had answered Yes to the first one. The Catalan government gave notice on 10 November, the day after voting, that 2,305,290 votes had been cast overall, but it did not provide a percentage figure for the turnout. Estimates for the turnout as published by the news media ranged from 37.0%, as given in The Economist and El País among others, to 41.6% as per the Catalan government's preliminary data. 80.8% of the cast votes supported the Yes–Yes option, 10.1% the Yes–No, 4.5% the No option.

Holding a referendum about the "political future of Catalonia" in 2014 was one of the items of the governance agreement ratified by Artur Mas from Convergence and Union (CiU) and Oriol Junqueras from Republican Left of Catalonia (ERC) on 18 December 2012, that allowed Artur Mas to be voted in as President of the Generalitat of Catalonia for a second term.

On 19 September 2014, the Catalan parliament approved a call for a referendum on independence. Eight days later Artur Mas announced that the vote was to be held on 9 November 2014. The same day the Spanish government announced that it would block the effort by appealing to the Constitutional Court of Spain. The Court decided to hear the Spanish government's case on 29 September 2014, and provisionally suspended the vote. The Catalan Government subsequently announced the "temporary suspension" of the referendum campaign.

On 14 October, Artur Mas proposed a "process of citizen participation" as an alternative to the original referendum. The Spanish government announced that it would also block this effort by appealing to the Constitutional Court, which decided to hear the Spanish government's case on 4 November 2014, and provisionally suspended the vote. The Catalan Government, however, pushed forward with the "citizen participation" process, in defiance of the Constitutional Court, and voting took place as planned on 9 November 2014.

== Background ==
=== 2009–2012 ===
==== Unofficial Catalan independence referendums ====
In 2009 and 2011 unofficial referendums took place in hundreds of Catalan towns as one of the many actions included in the independentist-wing-parties' platforms; in the referendums the pro-independence option won an overwhelming majority of the votes cast, although the participation rate was very low.

==== Demonstrations in Barcelona ====
In 2010 and 2012 different demonstrations took place in Barcelona. The first one took place on 10 July 2010. It featured a Catalan regionalist ideological leadership. The second one on 11 September 2012 was openly in favor of Catalan independence and had as a slogan "Catalonia, next state in Europe". As a consequence of this second demonstration, the Rt. Hon. Artur Mas, President of the Generalitat of Catalonia at that time, called a snap election, and the "Agreement for Freedom" was negotiated between Artur Mas (CiU "Conservativel local party") and Oriol Junqueras (ERC, Republican and socialistic-style left party).

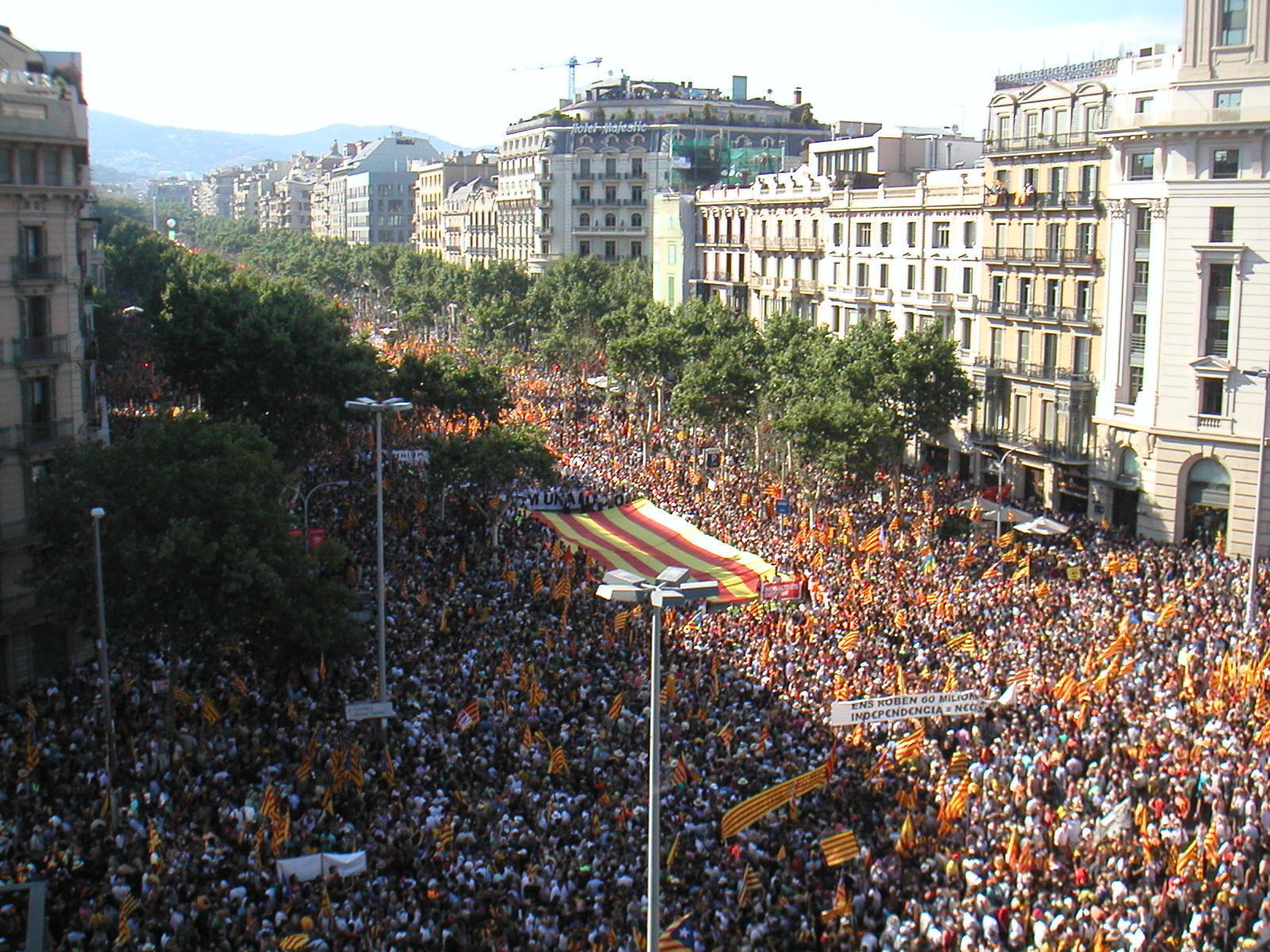
The Protest "Som una nació, nosaltres decidim" on 10 July 2010 at the junction of Passeig de Gràcia and Carrer d'Aragó.

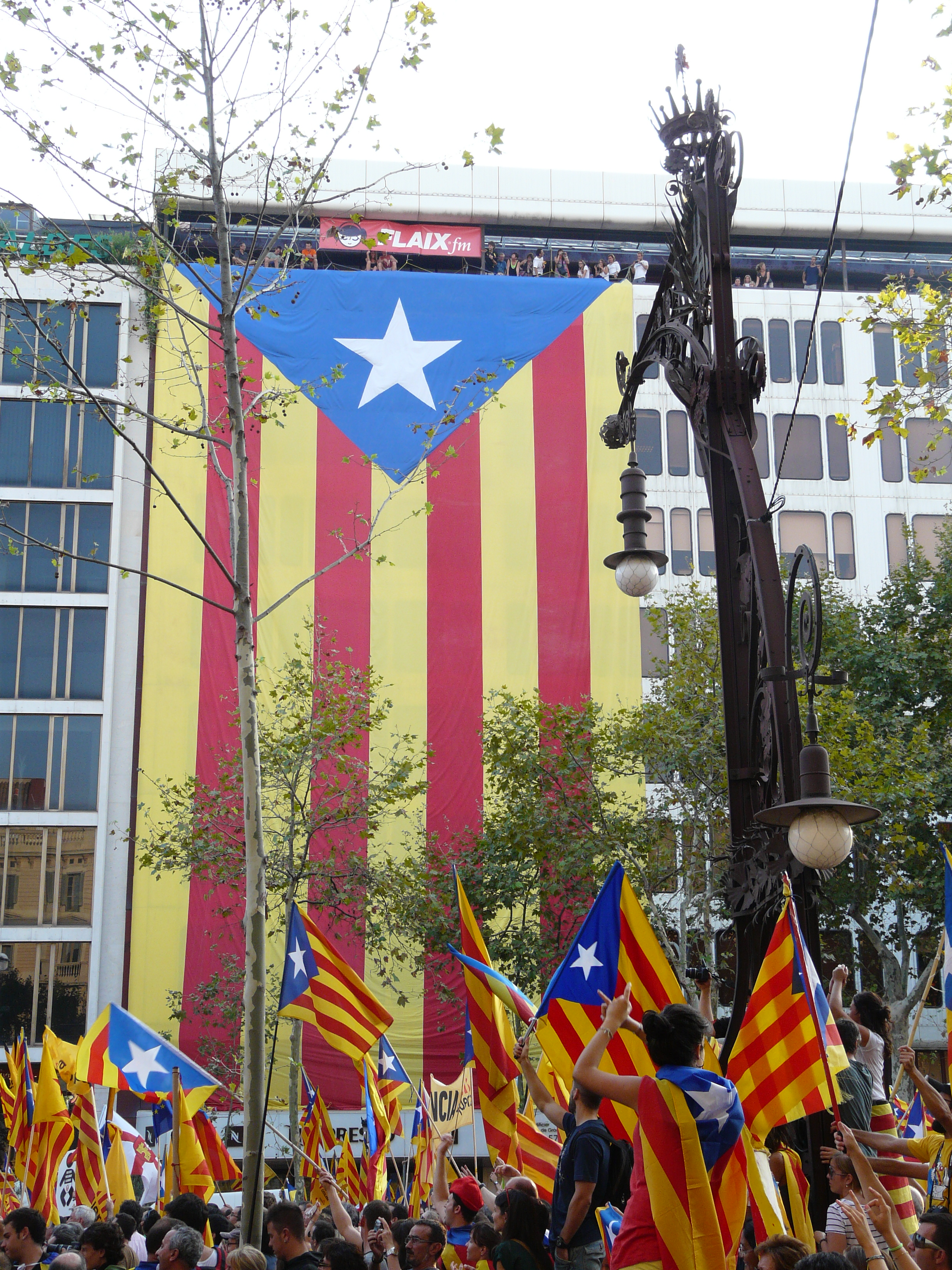
The Demonstration "Catalunya, nou estat d'Europa" of 11 September 2012. Estelada hanging between Carrer de Mallorca and Carrer de València, along Passeig de Gracia.

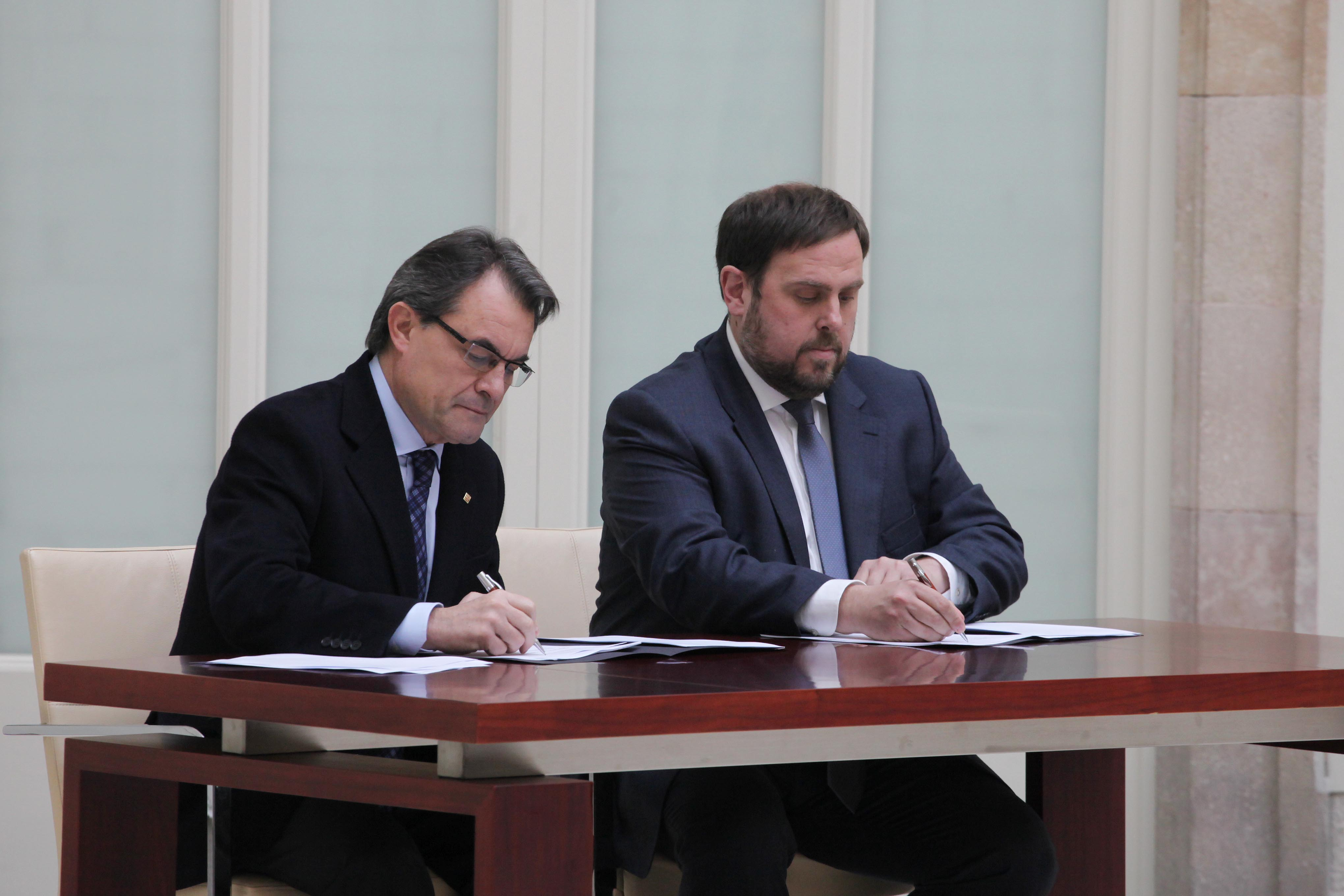
The President of the Generalitat of Catalonia Artur Mas and Oriol Junqueras, signing the 2012–2016 governability agreement on 19 December 2012.

==== Free Catalan Territories ====
Also, during 2012, dozens of Catalan towns declared themselves Free Catalan Territory stating that "the Spanish legislation and regulations have effect only in Spain, so this town will wait for new legislation and regulation from the Catalan Government and the Parliament of Catalonia."

==== Resolution of the Catalan Parliament for Holding an Independence Referendum ====
The Catalan independence referendum is planned to take place during the tenth legislature of the Parliament of Catalonia. According to a resolution adopted by the Parliament of Catalonia on 27 September 2012:

The Parliament of Catalonia confirms the need for the people of Catalonia to be able to freely and democratically determine their collective future and urges the government to hold a referendum during the following legislature.

The resolution was adopted after the general policy debate. It received 84 favourable votes, 21 against and 25 abstentions. The President of the Generalitat of Catalonia, Artur Mas, declared in a speech to Parliament that it was time for the people of Catalonia to exercise the right of self-determination.

=== 2013 ===
==== Declaration of Sovereignty ====
Results of the votes for the "Declaration of sovereignty" at the Catalan Parliament, on 23 January 2013

On 23 January 2013 the Parliament of Catalonia adopted by 85 favourable votes, 41 against, and 2 abstentions the "Declaration of Sovereignty and of the Right to Decide of the Catalan People". It states that "The people of Catalonia have – by reason of democratic legitimacy – the character of a sovereign political and legal entity." Five Socialist MPs did not vote. It is based on the following principles: sovereignty, democratic legitimacy, transparency, dialogue, social cohesion, Europeanism, legality, role of the Catalan Parliament and participation.

In accordance with the democratically expressed will of the majority of the Catalan public, the Parliament of Catalonia initiates a process to bring to promote the right of the citizens of Catalonia to collectively decide their political future.

The political parties Convergence and Union (CiU) (50 yes), Republican Left of Catalonia (ERC) (21 yes) and Initiative for Catalonia Greens-United and Alternative Left (ICV-EUiA) (13 yes) totally supported the statement of sovereignty. On the other hand, the People's Party of Catalonia (PPC) (19 no) and Citizens – Party of the Citizenry (C's) (9 no) totally opposed the proposal. 15 members of the Socialists' Party of Catalonia (PSC) voted against; 5 did not vote despite being present in the Chamber, thus disobeying the orders of the party whips to vote against the proposal. Finally, the Popular Unity Candidature (CUP) gave a "critical yes", with 1 vote in favour and 2 abstentions.

On 8 May 2013 this purely political declaration was provisionally suspended by the Constitutional Court of Spain.

== Date and wording ==
On 12 December 2013, the Government of Catalonia announced that a deal between Catalan nationalist parties had set the date and wording for the referendum on independence. The date would be 9 November 2014 and that it will contain a question with two sections: "Do you want Catalonia to become a State?" and "In case of an affirmative response, do you want this State to be independent?".

The date was chosen as it would allow for discussions with the Spanish Government in order "to stage the consultation legally", but the Spanish Government stated shortly thereafter its intention to block the referendum, stating: "Such a poll will not be held." Mariano Rajoy, Spanish Prime Minister, said that the referendum would be considered illegal and that "any discussion or debate on this is out of the question".

=== Ballot questions ===
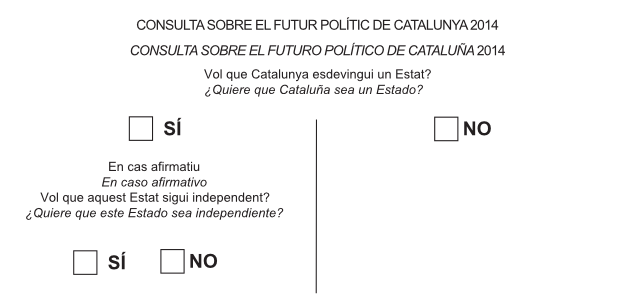
Ballot question (in Catalan and Spanish)

According to the consultation decree, "in the consultation there is a first question followed successively by a second question, and they are worded as follows: a) Do you want Catalonia to become a State? (Yes/No); If so: b) Do you want this State to be independent? (Yes/No). You can only answer the question under Letter b) in the event of having answered "Yes" to the question under Letter a)." The "participation process" that has replaced the "non-referendum consultation" maintains the same two questions.

=== Eligibility ===
The participation process does not have an official electorate. The vote has been called by the Catalan government for people who are at least 16 years of age on 9 November 2014 and who meet one of the following criteria:

- Spanish citizens whose national identity card states they are resident in Catalonia;
- Spanish citizens who live outside of Spain and are registered as "Catalans abroad" or "Spaniards abroad" linked to a Catalonia municipality;
- Foreign nationals who are legally residing in Catalonia;

Catalan people who are resident in other Spanish regions, and Spanish citizens who live in Catalonia but are not resident there, cannot vote.

Estimates of the number of people eligible to vote range between 5.4 million and 6.2 million.

== Legality ==
On 25 March 2014, the Spanish Constitutional Court finally ruled that the sovereignty part of the "Declaration of Sovereignty and of the Right to Decide of the Catalan People" was "unconstitutional and null", and therefore did not allow a self-determination referendum to be held in Catalonia. It however allows the part of the right to decide (allows to check the Catalan people's opinion by a legal consultation). The Catalan government declared that this ruling would "have no effect on the process".

On 8 April 2014, the Spanish Congress rejected the Catalan parliament's request to give it the power to organize the self-determination referendum. The bill was voted down 299 (PP, PSOE, UPyD, UPN and Foro Asturias) to 47 (CiU, Izquierda Unida, PNV, BNG, Amaiur, ERC, Compromís and Geroa Bai), with one abstention (NC-CC).

=== Catalan government's legal initiatives ===
Consultation and other forms of citizen participation Law

On 19 September 2014 the Parliament of Catalonia approved by 106 favourable votes, 28 against, the Consultation law. According to pro-consultation parties, this law will provide the legal basis for the President of the Generalitat of Catalonia, Artur Mas, to hold the consultation (non-binding self-determination referendum) on independence from Spain on 9 November.

Non-binding independence referendum decree

On 27 September 2014, Catalan President Artur Mas signed a decree calling for a consultation on independence. On 29 September 2014, the Spanish Constitutional Court provisionally suspended the vote. The Catalan Government subsequently announced the "temporary suspension" of the referendum campaign.

Citizen participation process

On 14 October, the Catalan President proposes a "process of citizen participation" as an alternative for the original referendum The Spanish government announced that it would block the effort by appealing to the Spanish Constitutional Court, which decided to hear the Spanish government case on 4 November 2014, which provisionally suspended the vote. The Catalan Government announced they would push forward with the vote, in defiance of the Constitutional Court of Spain. On 5 November, Catalan representatives complained against the Spanish Government to international organizations for blocking self-determination.

== Positions ==
=== Catalonia ===
Position of the parties with parliamentary representation in Catalonia (sorted by votes):

- CiU, liberal and Catalan nationalist coalition of CDC (37 seats) and UDC (13 seats): the goal to achieve a sovereign state in the European framework was included in their election manifesto, Catalunya 2020. This is an aim shared by a majority within the coalition and by CDC, including the party president Artur Mas. However some leaders of UDC such as Josep Antoni Duran Lleida have had an ambiguous position and have defended a confederal model. For the 9N consultation, CDC supports the "yes-yes" to independence whereas UDC supports the "yes" to the first question but has given liberty to its members on how to vote on the second question.
- ERC, social democratic and pro Catalan independence party (21 seats): ERC clearly supports Catalonia having its own State within the European Union framework, and for that reason they have signed the pact with CiU since 2012.
- PSC, social democratic party federated with the Spanish Socialist Workers' Party (20 seats): in the words of their leader, the PSC is against independence, but favours the holding of a legal referendum agreed with the Spanish Government. This is why it decided to abstain in all parliamentary votes dealing with the right to decide. Despite that, some notable PSC leaders (like Montserrat Tura and Joaquim Nadal) said they would vote for independence in a referendum. Miquel Iceta, leader of the PSC from 2014 to 2021, had declared that he would not vote in the participation process.
- PPC, the Catalan affiliate of the Spanish People's Party (19 seats): the PP believe that the referendum is illegal, they defend the Spanish Constitutional framework and are against secession. They also claim that the independence of Catalonia would give rise to a number of serious social and economic problems, such as expulsion from the Eurozone. The PP would not vote in the participation process.
- ICV-EUiA ecosocialist and Catalan nationalist coalition (ICV hold 10 seats and EUiA hold 3): ICV, an eco-socialist group, defends the right to self-determination, but party leaders have never responded as to how they would vote in a referendum and say they are a union of federalists and separatists. Joan Herrera, current leader of ICV, has declared he will not vote in the participation process.
- C's, a neoliberal party, which supports Catalan-Spanish bilingualism, (9 seats): C's is strongly positioned against the self-determination referendum unless it is previously approved by the Spanish parliament. Its leadership said that C's would not vote in the participation process.
- CUP, anti capitalist, socialist and pro-independence party (3 seats): the CUP is in favour of the independence of Catalonia, as part of the emancipation of all the "Catalan Countries" (territories where Catalan is spoken), and seeks the formation of a socialist country outside the European Union.

=== Rest of Spain ===
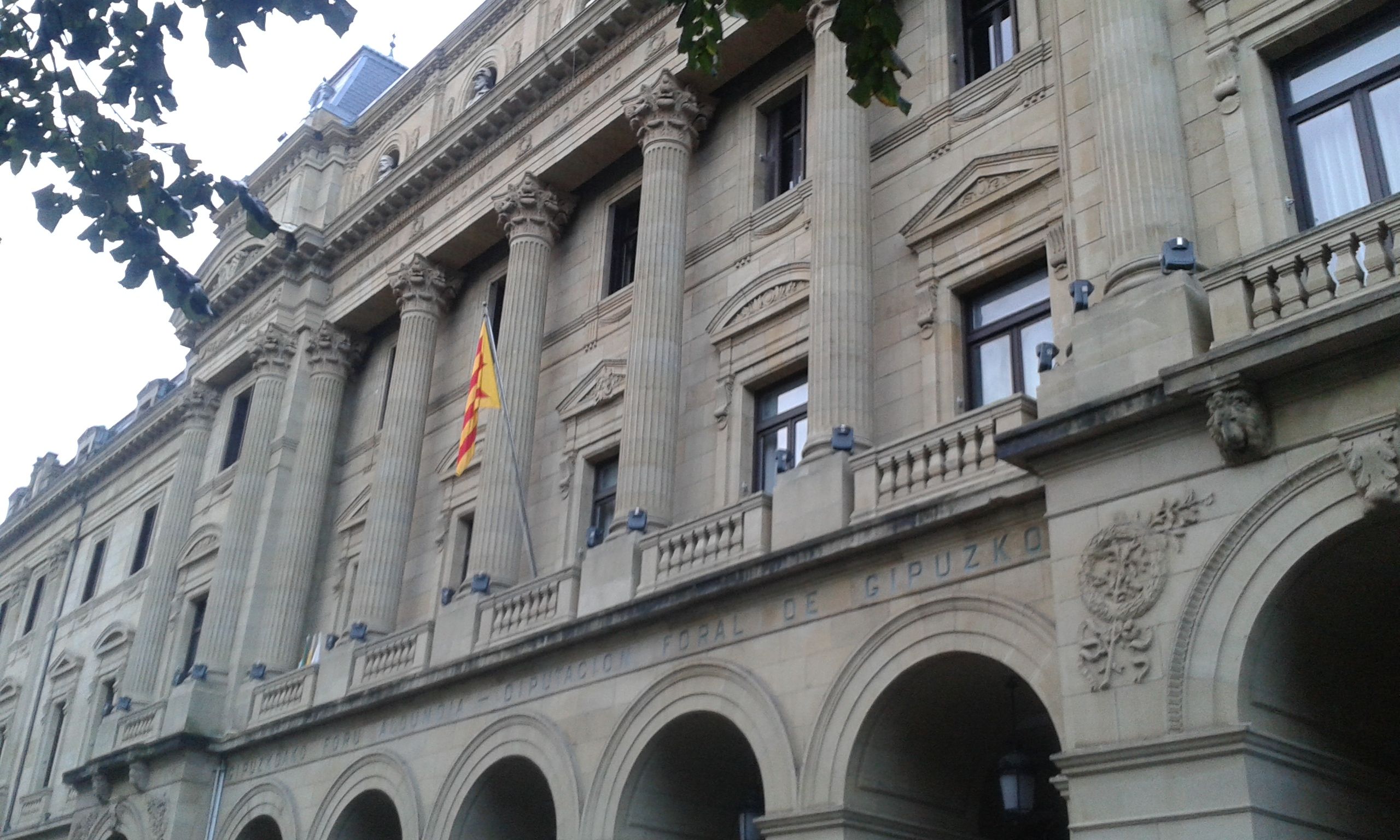
Catalan independence flag hoisted on the Gipuzkoa Regional Govt headquarters on 9 November 2014.

Spanish Government

The Spanish Government "will not allow" and "will not negotiate" on Catalonia's self-determination vote.

- Mariano Rajoy, Prime Minister of Spain: "I want to tell you with all clarity that this consultation will not take place". "Any discussion or debate on this is out of the question."
- Alberto Ruiz-Gallardón, Spanish Justice Minister: "The vote will not take place".

Parties

Position of the parties with parliamentary representation in the Parliament of Spain (sorted by seats):

- People's Party (PP) (186 seats) conservative, argue that the referendum is illegal. The Spanish deputy Prime Minister Soraya Saenz de Santamaria says Catalonia cannot hold an independence referendum without first consulting the rest of the country. She also said the call for a referendum "of this nature" requires prior constitutional procedures, which consist of "authorization by the State". She also noted that it would be a matter that would "affect the whole Spanish people, that is, the whole electoral roll and thus each and every Spanish citizen must be consulted, because it is up to all of us to determine the territorial organization".
- Spanish Socialist Workers' Party (PSOE) (110 seats) argue that the referendum is illegal. It considers the Catalan referendum 'unlawful and disastrous'. Reiterates that the route taken by the Government of Catalonia is a "road to nowhere".
- The Plural Left (11 seats) anti-capitalist and eco-socialist group led by United Left, and containing a number of left, environmental, Federalist and nationalist parties throughout Spain, defends a federal, multinational, social and Republican government and recognizes the right of the people of Catalonia to decide their political future.
- Amaiur (7 seats), Basque separatist party, actively supports the Catalan right to hold a referendum on self-determination and requests a similar right for the Spanish Basque Country.
- Union, Progress and Democracy (UPyD) (5 seats) argue that the referendum is illegal and believes that the Spanish government should use all legal means to prevent the referendum, and partially blames PP and PSOE for this situation.
- Basque Nationalist Party (5 seats) defends the right of the people of Catalonia to decide their political future and the Catalan independence referendum.
- Galician Nationalist Bloc (2 seats) defends the right of self-determination of Catalonia and a similar right for Galicia.
- Compromís (1 seat) Valencian coalition that contains left, environmental and Valencian nationalist parties, defends the Catalan referendum of self-determination.
- Foro Asturias (1 seat) opposes the Catalan referendum of self-determination because "national sovereignty resides in the Spanish people".

Regional Governments

The Basque Government supports the Catalan agreement to hold the referendum and calls on the Spanish government to recognise the referendum and allow it to be celebrated.

=== International reactions ===
Organisations

- United Nations — In April 2013, UN Secretary-General Ban Ki-moon stated in a press conference that "All the issues between the countries and among the countries should be resolved through peaceful means, through dialogue, respecting the genuine aspirations of the people concerned."
- European Union — A spokesperson of the European Commission declared that if Catalonia seceded from Spain it would automatically leave the European Union: "An independent state, because of its independence, would become a third country vis-à-vis the EU and as of the day of the independence the EU treaties will no longer apply'".
- NATO — A spokesperson for NATO said that an independent country would not automatically be part of the organisation, saying "for any nation to be incorporated into the alliance the consensus of all the NATO allies will be necessary".

States

- Germany — Chancellor Angela Merkel said: "We're in favour of the territorial integrity of all states but that's completely different to regions becoming independent and organising themselves. So I share the opinion of the Spanish government, and other than that I won't get involved in domestic Spanish matters".
- Latvia — Prime Minister Valdis Dombrovskis said: "If there is a clear will of the people and a clear demand for a referendum, it is absolutely worth it to pay attention and look at options on how to tackle it".
- Lithuania — Prime Minister Algirdas Butkevičius said: "Each country must find its own path and has the right to self-determination".
- France — Prime Minister Manuel Valls (born in Catalonia), announced in January 2014 that he does not agree with "the process that is underway in Catalonia" and reaffirmed that he is "anxious" about the referendum.
- United Kingdom — Prime Minister David Cameron (who enabled the 2014 Scottish independence referendum to be carried out) said: "I don't believe that, in the end, [it's right to] try to ignore these questions of nationality, independence, identity... I think it’s right to make your arguments, take them on and then you let the people decide. But that's the way I want to do things in the United Kingdom. I would never presume to tell people in Spain how to meet these challenges themselves; it's a matter for the Spanish Government and the Spanish Prime Minister." After the consultation he declared that he wanted Spain "to stay united" and that referendums "should be done through the proper constitutional and legal frameworks".
- United States — Deputy National Security Council Spokesperson and Assistant Press Secretary Caitlin Hayden said of the White House response to a petition on its website that was supported by 30,000 signatures: "The United States recognises the unique culture and traditions of the Catalan region, but considers the status of Catalonia to be an internal Spanish matter. We are confident that the Government and the people of Spain will resolve this issue in accordance with their laws and Constitution."

European parties

- Graham Watson, President of the Alliance of Liberals and Democrats for Europe Party (ALDE): "The people of Catalonia have the right to choose their own future [...] I believe in the democracy. Catalans should be able to choose. That's what democracy is about."
- The European Free Alliance stated: "We believe that freedom, democracy and the right to decide on your own future are core values of Europe. We would welcome Catalonia and a Catalan Republic to be a new state within Europe, if the people so decide"
- Ska Keller, The Greens–European Free Alliance: "The Greens defend radical democracy and in Catalonia there is a citizen demand in favour of a [self-determination] referendum. For this reason I want to make the personal commitment that, if I am elected Commission President, I will support Catalonia in allowing a consultation vote on its political future and its relationship with Spain".

Media

- David Gardner, International Affairs Editor at the Financial Times, wrote: "No one can simply ban a democratic referendum in Catalonia". On 15 December 2013, the Financial Times published an editorial that read: "This is a political problem that requires a negotiated solution – more federalism within Spain’s crying need for institutional renewal." It exhorted "politicians from both sides (...) to prevent what is at root a political issue becoming a problem that threatens the very state."
- The Economist published an article in the week after the November 2014 ballot arguing that "The Madrid government should let the Catalans have a vote—and then defeat the separatists at the polls."

Individuals

- The LetCatalansVote manifesto included a statement that read "we call on the Spanish government and institutions and their Catalan counterparts to work together to allow the citizens of Catalonia to vote on their political future and then negotiate in good faith based on the result."

== Opinion polling ==
=== Attitudes in Catalonia ===
==== Surveys with the referendum questions ====
Since December 2013, several surveys had been carried out on the two stated questions of the referendum. The "Yes/Yes"-option indicates the percentage of voters in favour of Catalonia becoming an independent state and the "Yes/No"-option indicates the percentage in favour of Catalonia becoming a state but against independence. Voters who vote in the first question no, are against Catalonia becoming a state.

Date published	Polling organisation	Yes/Yes	Yes/No	Yes/Undecided	No	Undecided/Abstention
Sep 2014	El Mundo	34.6%	4.5%	2.3%	39.5%	19.2%
Mar 2014	El Periódico de Catalunya	46.1%	4.4%	2.8%	31.9%	14.8%
5 Feb 2014	8 al dia	40.7%	3.8%	3.5%	24.4%	27.5%
16–19 Dec 2013	La Vanguardia	44.9%	8.4%	-	36.6%	10.1%
12–13 Dec 2013	El Mundo	35.2%	5.5%	2.3%	39.1%	17.9%
12–13 Dec 2013	El Periódico de Catalunya	44.1%	5.8%	2.4%	30.4%	17.3%

==== Short-term polling ====
Date published	Polling organisation	Support	Reject	Undecided	Lead
Sep 2013	Cadena SER	52.3%	24.1%	23.6%	28.2%
Jun 2013	Centre d'Estudis d'Opinió	55.6%	23.4%	21%	32.2%
May 2013	El Periódico de Catalunya	57.8%	36%	6.2%	21.8%
Feb 2013	Centre d'Estudis d'Opinió	54.7%	20.7%	24.6%	34%
Sep 2012	Telecinco (GESOP)	50.9%	18.6%	30.5%	32.3%
Jul 2012	Diari Ara	50.4%	23.8%	25.8%	26.6%
Jun 2012	Centre d'Estudis d'Opinió	51.1%	21.1%	27.8%	30%
Mar 2012	Centre d'Estudis d'Opinió	44.6%	24.7%	30.7%	19.9%
Jan 2012	El Periódico de Catalunya	53.6%	32%	14.4%	21.6%

==== Long-term surveys ====
Trends in support for Catalan independence can be observed by comparing more recent surveys with that carried out by Spain's Centro de Investigaciones Sociológicas in 1996, which asked "Personally, would you support or reject Catalonia becoming independent?".

Date published	Polling organisation	Support	Reject	Undecided	Lead
2011	Institut de Ciències Polítiques i Socials	41.4%	22.9%	35.7%	18.5%
1996	Centro de Investigaciones Sociológicas	33.6%	53.5%	13.1%	19.9%

== Results ==
The Catalan government indicated that 2,305,290 votes were cast overall, out of 5.4m eligible voters. The Catalan government did not provide a final turnout percentage figure. Turnout estimates published by media outlets range between 37.0% and 41.6% (the latter figure, based on the Catalan government's preliminary data). 80.8% of the cast votes supported the Yes-Yes option, 10.1% the Yes-No, 4.5% the No option.

Choice	Votes	%
Yes/Yes	1,861,753	80.76
Yes/No	232,182	10.07
Yes/Blank ballots	22,466	0.97
Total Yes	2,116,401	91.80
No	104,760	4.54
Total No	104,760	4.54
Blank ballots	12,986	0.56
Others	71,131	3.09
Total	2,305,290	100.00
Source: Generalitat of Catalonia

Turnout varied greatly across the 41 administrative districts of Catalonia. It was higher than 50% in twelve of them, whereas in two it was lower than 25%. The proportion of Yes-Yes votes over the total electorate ranged between 12.9% (Val d'Aran) and 56.9% (Priorat). In the most populous district (Barcelonès) turnout was 32.5% and the overall proportion of Yes-Yes votes reached 24.9%.

=== By District ===
Below is a table outlining the results of the referendum by district. The table does not consider turnout.

District	First question					Second question				Yes-Yes / total %	Valid ballots
District	Yes	No	Blank	Oth	Yes %	Yes-Yes	Yes-No	Yes-Abs	Y-Y %	Yes-Yes / total %	Valid ballots
Alt Camp	16,018	519	123	526	93.20%	15,012	846	160	93.72%	87.35%	17,186
Alt Empordà	39,017	1,474	259	1,390	92.59%	36,131	2,349	537	92.60%	85.74%	42,140
Alt Penedès	39,906	1,227	219	1,183	93.82%	36,648	2,846	412	91.84%	86.16%	42,535
Alt Urgell	7,454	203	78	222	93.68%	6,854	485	115	91.95%	86.14%	7,957
Alta Ribagorça	1,195	60	9	37	91.85%	1,033	150	12	86.44%	79.40%	1,301
Anoia	36,885	1,705	188	1,460	91.67%	33,365	3,077	443	90.46%	82.92%	40,238
Bages	67,858	2,457	465	1,657	93.68%	62,593	4,561	704	92.24%	86.41%	72,437
Baix Camp	49,437	2,477	309	1,700	91.68%	44,779	4,074	584	90.58%	83.04%	53,923
Baix Ebre	25,384	962	227	821	92.66%	23,435	1,638	311	92.32%	85.55%	27,394
Baix Empordà	42,539	1,326	249	1,344	93.58%	39,586	2,469	484	93.06%	87.08%	45,458
Baix Llobregat	174,760	14,945	937	7,110	88.37%	142,611	30,329	1,820	81.60%	72.12%	197,752
Baix Penedès	19,955	1,240	114	812	90.21%	17,753	1,977	225	88.97%	80.25%	22,121
Barcelonès	569,470	32,475	3,469	20,060	91.05%	479,315	84,171	5,984	84.17%	76.63%	625,474
Berguedà	19,450	287	149	471	95.54%	18,706	612	132	96.17%	91.89%	20,357
Cerdanya	6,019	191	56	234	92.60%	5,554	389	76	92.27%	85.45%	6,500
Conca de Barberà	9,534	197	70	306	94.33%	9,047	388	99	94.89%	89.51%	10,107
Garraf	37,398	1,935	186	1,331	91.55%	32,730	4,268	400	87.52%	80.12%	40,850
Garrigues	9,384	173	92	191	95.37%	8,836	396	152	94.16%	89.80%	9,840
Garrotxa	24,686	377	173	617	95.49%	23,652	789	245	95.81%	91.49%	25,853
Gironès	63,622	1,687	346	1,607	94.59%	59,374	3,723	525	93.32%	88.27%	67,262
Maresme	137,705	5,013	724	4,088	93.34%	123,179	13,236	1,290	89.45%	83.49%	147,530
Montsià	21,021	921	166	801	91.76%	19,256	1,445	320	91.60%	84.05%	22,909
Noguera	15,502	398	169	358	94.37%	14,511	758	233	93.61%	88.34%	16,427
Osona	71,397	1,076	441	1,309	96.19%	68,233	2,616	548	95.57%	91.93%	74,223
Pallars Jussà	5,308	114	44	147	94.57%	4,981	272	55	93.84%	88.74%	5,613
Pallars Sobirà	2,934	52	24	74	95.14%	2,738	156	40	93.32%	88.78%	3,084
Pla d'Urgell	14,698	398	147	340	94.32%	13,817	699	182	94.01%	88.67%	15,583
Pla de l'Estany	14,818	177	85	231	96.78%	14,187	483	148	95.74%	92.66%	15,311
Priorat	5,132	82	28	124	95.64%	4,887	177	68	95.23%	91.07%	5,366
Ribera d'Ebre	9,491	310	90	282	93.30%	8,841	531	119	93.15%	86.91%	10,173
Ripollès	12,465	288	102	334	94.51%	11,762	534	169	94.36%	89.18%	13,189
Segarra	8,219	199	67	247	94.13%	7,715	396	108	93.87%	88.35%	8,732
Segrià	60,825	2,843	468	1,926	92.07%	54,538	5,545	742	89.66%	82.56%	66,062
Selva	49,105	1,871	272	1,652	92.83%	45,249	3,294	562	92.15%	85.54%	52,900
Solsonès	5,915	106	56	139	95.16%	5,572	283	60	94.20%	89.64%	6,216
Tarragonès	48,678	3,971	294	2,003	88.59%	42,472	5,635	571	87.25%	77.30%	54,946
Terra Alta	4,773	184	42	166	92.41%	4,404	282	87	92.27%	85.27%	5,165
Urgell	14,919	328	112	387	94.75%	14,023	701	195	93.99%	89.06%	15,746
Val d'Aran	1,365	223	24	131	78.31%	1,091	241	33	79.93%	62.59%	1,743
Vallès Occidental	234,129	14,254	1,255	9,177	90.46%	199,433	32,402	2,294	85.18%	77.06%	258,815
Vallès Oriental	118,031	6,047	658	4,136	91.59%	103,850	12,959	1,222	87.99%	80.58%	128,872
Catalonia	2,116,401	104,772	12,986	71,131	91.81%	1,861,753	232,182	22,466	87.97%	80.76%	2,305,290

=== Reactions ===
Catalan president Artur Mas said the vote was "a lesson in democracy." Spanish Prime Minister Mariano Rajoy called the vote a "deep failure" because "two-thirds of Catalans did not participate" and he claimed it violated a ruling of the Constitutional Court.

== Legal consequences ==
On 6 February 2017, a trial against the former president of the Government of Catalonia Artur Mas, the former vice president Joana Ortega and the former Catalan education minister Irene Rigau was held by the Supreme Court of Catalan Justice. They were accused of serious civil disobedience and perverting the course of justice for having authorized the unofficial vote on 9 November 2014 in defiance of its prohibition by the Constitutional Court of Spain. Prosecutors were calling for Artur Mas to be disqualified from office for 10 years, while Ortega and Rigau for 9. The trial focused on the events since the suspension decided by the Constitutional Court on 4 November 2014, until the beginning of the popular vote, on 9 November.

In the event, in March 2017 Mas was barred from public office for two years by a court in Barcelona for organizing an illegal vote in defiance of the Spanish courts. He was also fined 36,500 euros; Joana Ortega and Irene Rigau, were also convicted, barred 21 months and 18 months, respectively, as well as receiving lesser fines.

== See also ==
- Catalan Sovereignty Declaration
- 2017 Catalan independence referendum
- 2008 Basque referendum
- Independence referendum
