= Spanish Amnesty Law =

Spanish Amnesty Law may refer to:

- 1977 Spanish Amnesty Law, relating to the Spanish Civil War and Francoist Spain
- 2024 Spanish Amnesty Law, relating to the Catalan declaration of independence
