= National November =

National November Noviembre Nacional
- Abbreviation: NN
- Leader: Iván Rico Olivares; Enrique Lemus; Isabel Peralta
- Founded: January 2024
- Registered: August 2024 (National Nucleus association); 10 February 2026 (National November party)
- Headquarters: Madrid
- Membership (2026): 2,000-2,500
- Ideology: Ultranationalism; Neo-Nazism; Ethnic nationalism; Xenophobia; Falangism; Anti-immigration; Islamophobia; Antisemitism; Anti-LGBTQ; Ecofascism
- Political position: Far-right
- Colours: Black
- Congress of Deputies: 0 / 350
- Senate: 0 / 266
- European Parliament: 0 / 61
- Regional parliaments: 0 / 1,268
- Mayors in Spain: 0 / 8,122
- Town councillors (Note: Pedro Jesús Espada Guijarro): 1 / 67,121

Website
- nucleonacionalesp.com

National November (NN; Spanish: Noviembre Nacional) is a Spanish far-right and Neo-Nazi political party and movement, formerly operating as a political group named National Nucleus (Spanish: Núcleo Nacional), although it is still commonly referred to by that name in the country and in the media. The National Nucleus was founded by far-right participants of the 2023–2024 Spanish protests against Catalan amnesty and has been officially registered in the National Registry of Associations of the Spanish Ministry of the Interior since August 2024. In 2026, National Nucleus formed a political party called National November.

On November 2026, one of the leaders, Isabel Peralta, was found to have 10 rifles, three shotguns, three pistols, a dozen boxes of ammunition and an oath to Adolf Hitler. The National Police also intercepted chats from the group that reveals the obsession of its militants with centers of Muslims, Jews and unaccompanied minors. According to the National Police, the "ultimate goal" is to establish a new regime in the Spanish State—replacing the 1978 Spanish Constitution—based on the principles of the National Socialist German Workers' Party. On November 12, a Gijón judge overseeing the case ordered the complete cessation of National Nucleus' activities, the closure of its premises, and the blocking of its social media channels as well as the bank accounts of the arrested members.

== History ==
=== National Nucleus ===
National Nucleus (NN) was formed during the 2023–2024 Spanish protests against Catalan amnesty by a right-wing extremist sector of protesters and their social media supporters. "National November" is the name of protests used by the far right. Many of NN members come from groups such as Bastión Frontal, Ultras Sur, Skin Moncloa, and FE de las JONS.

The group made its first appearance at an event held on 14 April 2024, at Espacio Ardemans, although it had been active on Telegram since January of that year.

=== National November ===
Since 10 February 2026, National Nucleus has been registered as a political party with the Ministry of the Interior under the name National November, based in Valladolid. The political party is chaired by Enrique Lemus, former leader of the far-right National Democracy party.

In early July 2026, Iván Rico Olivares, spokesperson for the National Nucleus group and a Holocaust denier, publicly announced the formation of a political party called National November, with the aim of "fighting for their ideas using the tools of the 1978 regime." Unlike on other occasions, in this appearance the group leaders fully revealed their faces. His brother, David Rico, also appeared in the announcement video.

The group announced that on 11 July they would present their proposal at their headquarters in Madrid, called "El Nido" ("The Nest") in reference to the Kehlsteinhaus (Eagle's Nest) in Berchtesgaden, Adolf Hitler's retreat. The group made public their dress code for the occasion, formal and casual wear, with no "frills" or flip-flops or tank tops. They also urged people to buy their clothing from the group's shop, where some of the items feature Nazi imagery, such as a Hello Kitty dressed as Hitler.

Among those present at the 11 July event were David and Iván Rico, Enrique Lemus, and Isabel Peralta, leader of the now dissolved neo-Nazi activist group Bastión Frontal, who was sentenced to a year in prison for inciting violence against immigrants. Peralta was also deported from a German airport for carrying the Nazi flag, which is illegal in the country. Alberto Pugilato, a member of the skinhead movement, was also present. Pugilato had previously been sentenced to a year in prison and fined €1,800 for a hate crime related to promoting white supremacy. Pedro Jesús Espada, a councilor in the Velilla de San Antonio City Council, was present wearing the NN uniform.

== Ideology ==
According to its own website, the party claims to defend the promotion of birth rates, the traditional family, national identity, and the protection of European culture. According to the Spanish newspaper El Mundo, the party also consider itself "a project aimed at bringing together Francoists, Falangists, National Socialists, and conservatives". It also expresses its opposition to queer theory and maintains that men and women play distinct roles within the family. In religious matters, it expresses its support for Christianity and rejects atheism, although it declares its respect for freedom of worship "as long as it does not contradict the interests of Spain" and Isabel Peralta herself said in interviews, "I do not [believe in God] either". It also states that it does not admit non-European members. In the economic sphere, it proposes measures favorable to entrepreneurship and the improvement of working conditions for Spanish workers. It defends the unity of Spain, opposes separatism, and asserts that there are international elites seeking to divide Spanish society. In environmental matters, it proposes the protection of nature and biodiversity and advocates for greater engagement with rural areas.

The party was described by several media outlets as xenophobic, ultranationalist, and possessing an ideology that bears several similarities to Nazi and fascist principles. According to the Spanish Revolution, NN's discourse is characterized by its opposition to democracy and the dissemination of conspiracy theories such as the Great Replacement and Holocaust denial. NN have labeled Moroccan immigration an "invasion," proposing an "active defense" of the streets, which has led several national media outlets to consider these proposals as hate speech. Like the German Alternative for Germany (AfD) party, NN also promotes the "remigration" of migrants., although officially the party officially opposes the AfD, considering it "the only party in Germany with a Jewish clique within the group's own organization", and officially cooperate closer with german organizations which are openly neonazis as The Third Way, and Die Heimat.

According to various media outlets, the group has alluded to violence on several occasions and has been accused of verbal attacks against various groups, including non-European immigrants, Jews, Muslims, the LGBT community, feminists, and others. The group had also expressed opposition to globalization and international organizations such as NATO and the European Union.

== Controversies ==
On 28 January 2026, three members of the group were arrested by the Civil Guard in Castellón and Burriana, accused of hate crimes, after allegedly carrying out an attack with racist and Islamophobic graffiti and neo-Nazi stickers against the business of a man of Moroccan origin in Burriana.

On 8 March 2026, 10 members of the organization were arrested in Madrid for public disorder, and one for assaulting authorities, after attempting to disrupt a feminist demonstration on International Women's Day with anti-feminist and racist slogans, and provoking a subsequent confrontation with the police.

During the 2026 May Day demonstration in Madrid, in the Lavapiés neighborhood, five people from the group (one of them a minor) were arrested for public disorder and illegal possession of weapons.

In November, 2026, 14 National November members, Including two of the leaders, Ivan Olivares and Isabel Peralta, and Spanish singer Alberto González de Juan (better known by his pseudonym Alberto Pugilato) were arrested during a police investigation into alleged hate crimes and conspiracy.

The arrests happened a day before a planned rally in Madrid, intended to be a march towards the headquarters of the Spanish Socialist Workers' Party, which was planned to have the presence of multiple foreign Far-right and neofascist organizations, including American group the Patriot Front, theBulgarian National Union and a pair of German organizations: Third Way and Junge Nationalisten, the youth wing of Neo-nazi party Die Heimat.

On November 6, 2026, the National Police arrested 14 members of the group in various provinces of Spain. These arrests took place because, according to the National Police, the group was planning an "armed uprising." According to the arrest report, they had met with the Azov Brigade and had been receiving paramilitary training in Ukraine. During this training, they participated in paramilitary exercises using bulletproof vests and AK-47 rifles, despite not having a firearms license.

According to the investigation, the neo-Nazi group planned to replace the State Security Forces with militants who had been receiving military training in Ukraine. Furthermore, it was discovered that they are part of an ultra-right-wing network that includes other groups such as Honor et Patria (Romania), Hussards Paris (France), the Hungarian Legion (Hungary), The Third Way (Germany), and Prevrat (Croatia).

Among the members of the organization are minors as young as 14, and the arrests were able to take place ahead of schedule, prompted by the Juvenile Prosecutor's Office, which launched an investigation in February 2026 following disturbances near the La Inmaculada school in Gijón. These disturbances occurred after Núcleo Nacional staged an act glorifying fascism at a monument on the school's facade.

On November 11, 2026, Isabel Peralta was found to have 10 rifles, three shotguns, three pistols, a dozen boxes of ammunition and an oath to Adolf Hitler. The National Nucleus allegedly planned to attack mosques and synagogues, texting “We must start with incinerations.” The chats intercepted by the National Police of the neo-Nazi group reveal the obsession of its militants with centers of Muslims, Jews and unaccompanied minors.
