= Hacer Nación =

Spanish Political Party

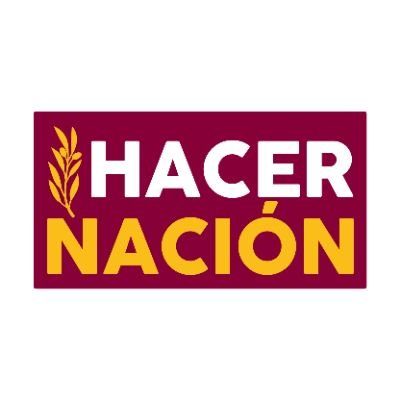
- Founded: 2020
- Dissolved: 2025
- Split from: España 2000
- Merged into: Vox
- Ideology: Spanish nationalism Neo-fascism; Identitarianism; Anti-immigration; Anti-globalism; Sovereigntism; Economic nationalism
- Political position: Far-right
- Local government: 2 / 60,941

Website
- hacernacion.es

Hacer Nación is a far-right political party in Spain, founded in 2020, formed after a split from España 2000. It was created with the purpose of uniting different sectors of the Spanish far-right scene. Their main activity is activism, social actions, propaganda and conferences. Hacer Nación remained active until the end of November 2025, when it announced its dissolution. Shortly afterward, its main leaders and a considerable portion of its membership joined the union Solidaridad, which is linked to VOX.

== History ==
It was presented in July 2020, at its Summer University in Alcalá de Henares (Madrid), with the participation of approximately 50 people. Under the slogan "community, sovereignty, future," they staged the union of different neo-fascist organizations from various parts of the country.

In 2023 they took part in the 2023 Spanish local elections, winning 2 councillors in Velilla de San Antonio.

The party is taking part in the 2023 Spanish protests against the government in various Spanish cities.

In the end of November 2025, the group announced its dissolution. After that most of its leading cadres and a broad sector of its membership moved to the union Solidaridad; this incorporation took place at the union level and not as direct affiliation to the VOX party.

== Ideology ==
The party has been described as far-right, neo-fascist and Identitarian. The party espouses anti-immigration rhetoric. In territorial politics, it defends the unity of Spain. They are also against the Great Replacement and globalism. They are strongly nativist. They describe themselves as a patriotic, sovereigntist and economic nationalist movement.

== International connections ==
The party has links with the Hungarian ultranationalist party Mi Hazánk.

== Electoral results ==
The party has only participated in the 2023 Spanish local elections, in 4 municipalities, winning 2 councillors in Velilla de San Antonio.

2023 Spanish local elections
Municipality	Votes	% of votes	Councillors
San Fernando de Henares	978	4.82%	0
Velilla de San Antonio	817	11.92%	2
Jaén	271	0.48%	0
Barrax	55	4.38%	0
