= 2023–2024 Spanish anti-amnesty protests =

Series of protests, mostly in Madrid

- Part of 2023 Spanish government formation
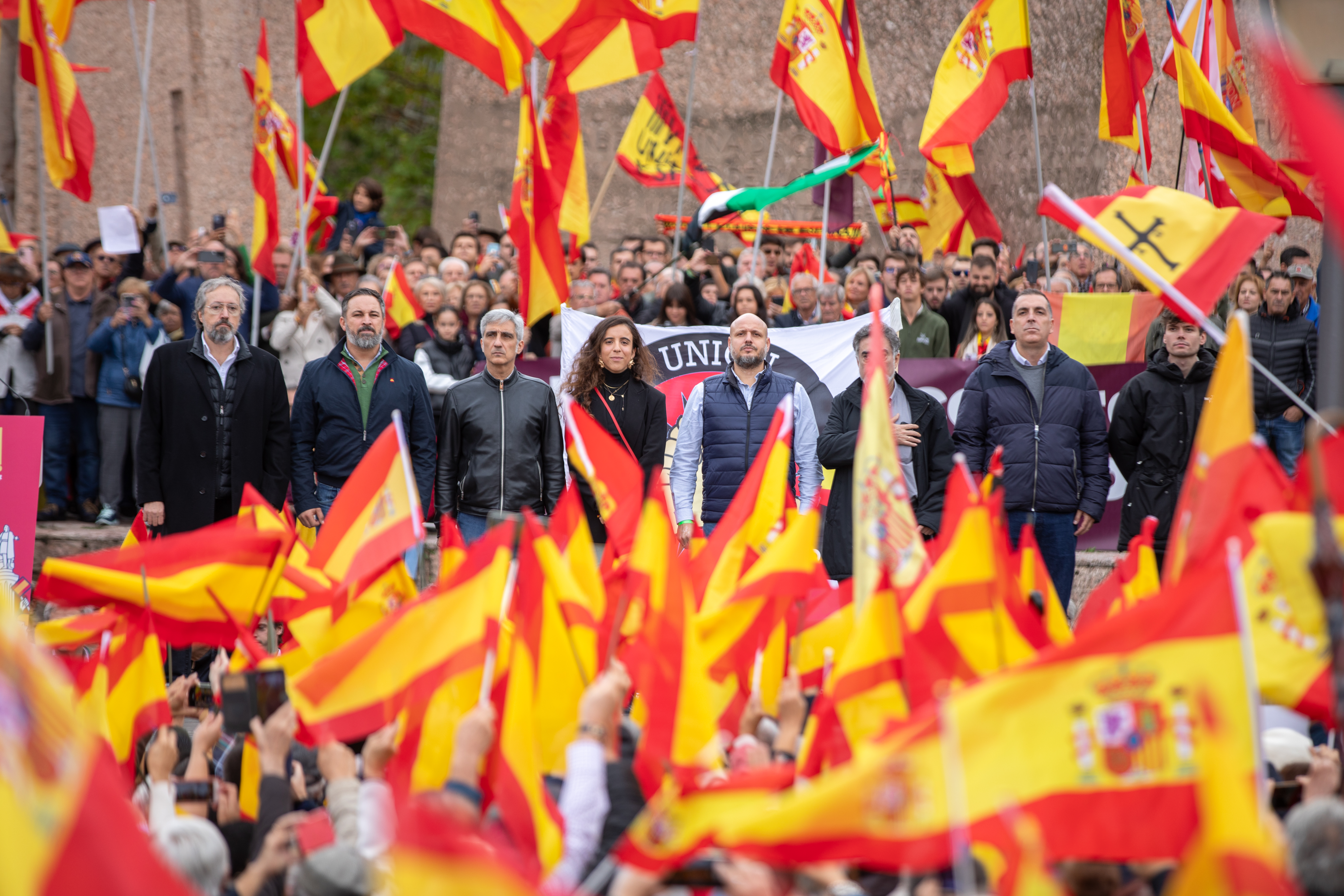
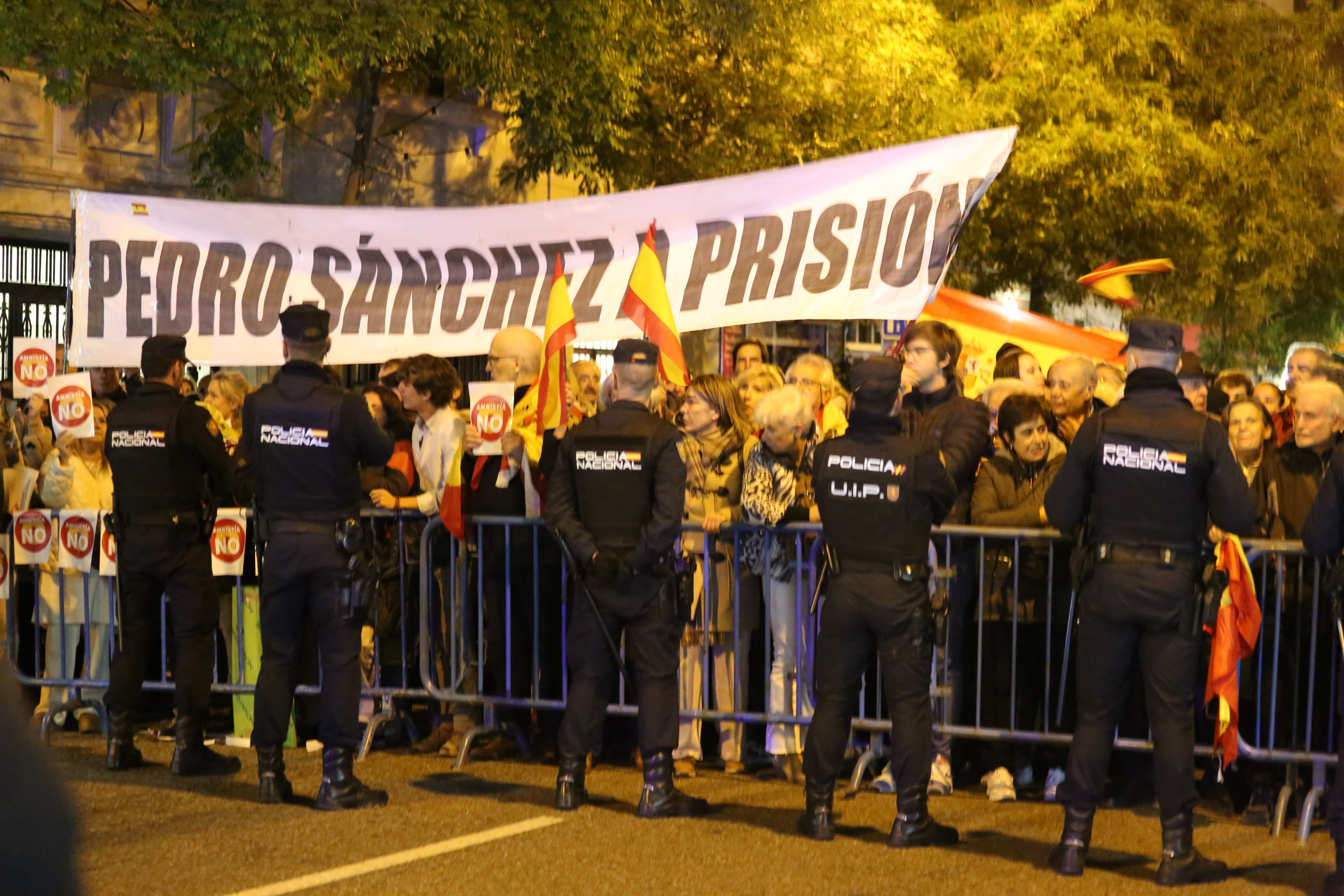
- Demonstration in Plaza de Colón on 29 October 2023 (top); protest against the amnesty in Calle de Ferraz on 6 November (bottom)
- Date: 29 October 2023 – 26 May 2024 (6 months, 3 weeks and 6 days)
- Location: Spain
- Caused by: Negotiations to form a new government headed by Pedro Sánchez's PSOE; Amnesty Law for Catalan politicians convicted or investigated for events related to the 2017–2018 Spanish constitutional crisis and the 2019 Catalan protests.; Economic and political concessions to pro-independence parties (Note: The PSOE reached investiture agreements with ERC and Junts, in addition to the BNG and the PNV.)
- Goals: Prevent the processing of the amnesty law; Resignation of Pedro Sánchez; Dissolution of parliament and calling of a new general election
- Methods: Protests, demonstrations, civil disobedience, civil disorder (rioting, vandalism)
- Status: Failed: Sánchez's third government formed; Amnesty law introduced; New elections not called

Parties
Protesters Supported by: Civil & political organizations: Junta Democrática; Societat Civil Catalana; NEOS; DENAES Foundation; Solidaridad; S'ha Acabat!; Revuelta; Núcleo Nacional Organized gangs: Desokupa; Bastión Frontal; FACTA; Hogar Social Madrid; Ultra Sur; Frente Atlético; Suburbios Firm Parliamentary political parties: People's Party; Vox; Navarrese People's Union Non-parliamentary political parties: Citizens–Party of the Citizenry; Workers' Front; National Democracy; España 2000; FE de las JONS; La Falange; Hacer Nación	Government of Spain; Ministry of the Interior; National Police Corps; Police Intervention Units; Municipalities of Spain; Municipal Police Corps; Madrid Municipal Police; Barcelona Urban Guard; Spanish Socialist Workers' Party (HQs targeted by protesters)

Lead figures
No centralized leadership	Pedro Sánchez; Fernando Grande-Marlaska; Francisco Pardo

Casualties and losses
50 injured +30 detained	36 injured

A series of protests began in Spain resulting from the announced negotiations of then-acting prime minister Pedro Sánchez's Spanish Socialist Workers' Party (PSOE) with former president of the Government of Catalonia Carles Puigdemont's Together for Catalonia (Junts) party in October 2023. These negotiations were aimed at forming a governing coalition after the 2023 Spanish general election.

Alberto Núñez Feijóo's People's Party (PP), failed to form a government as they could not muster enough support to reach a parliamentary majority. After Feijóo failed in his investiture vote, King Felipe VI tasked Sánchez with forming a government. The distribution of seats, after the election resulted in Sánchez being required to rely on Junts (with seven seats in the Congress of Deputies at the time) to vote in his favor to be able to form a government. Junts had not supported him in the formation of previous governments, having voted against him in his July 2019 and January 2020 investiture votes.

The starting position of Junts and Republican Left of Catalonia (ERC) in negotiations were the amnesty of all participants in the 2017 Catalan independence referendum, and the possibility of holding a new referendum. Catalan Civil Society (SCC), a group opposed to Catalan independence, called a demonstration for 8 October, in response to a potential amnesty. On 28 October Sánchez discussed the amnesty proposal at a PSOE federal committee, as part of government formation negotiations. Following the investment of Sanchez's government in the middle of November, the protests against Catalan amnesty began declining by late February, with new protests being called at the end of May days before the law was passed, having failed to achieve their objectives.

== Protests in 2023 ==
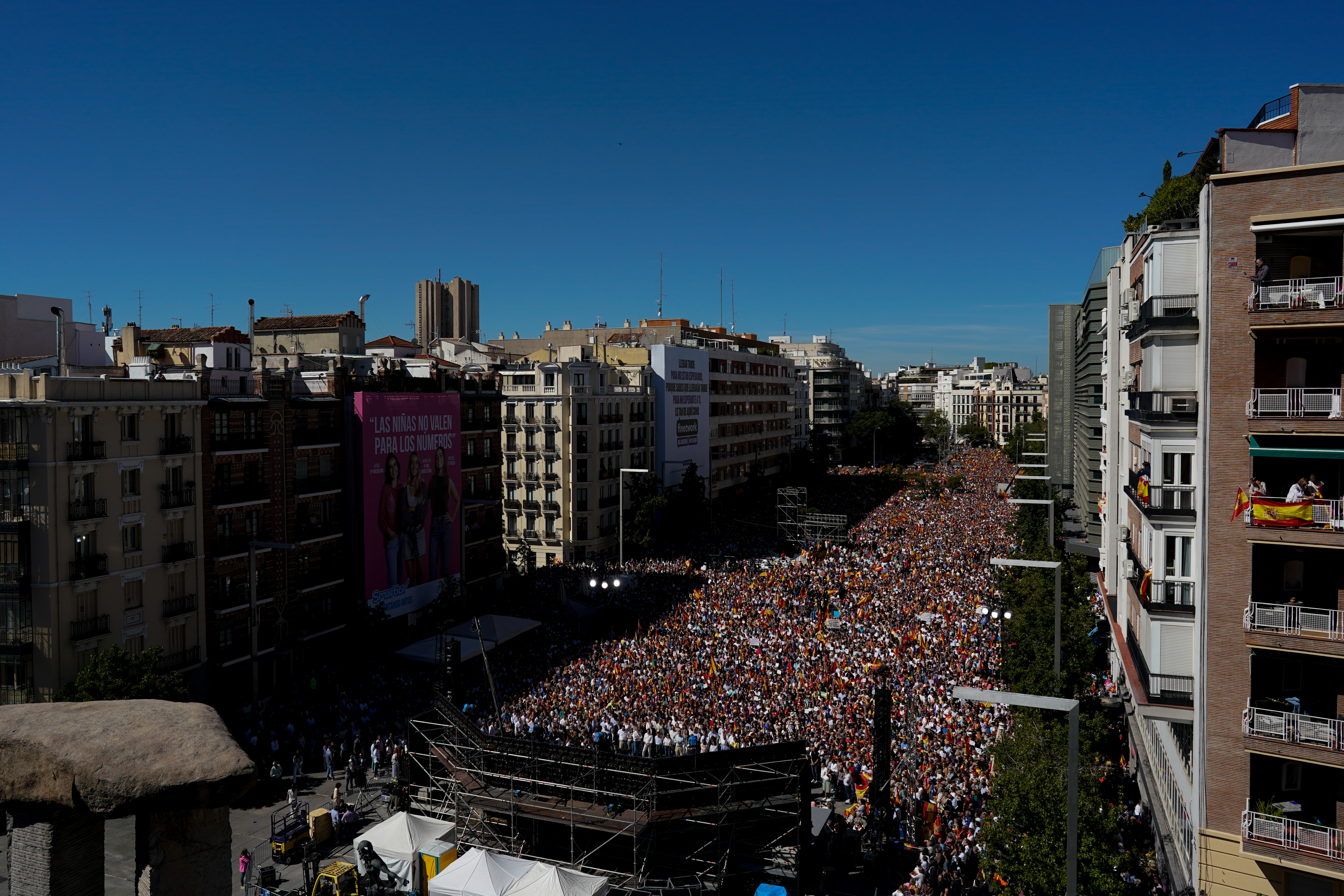
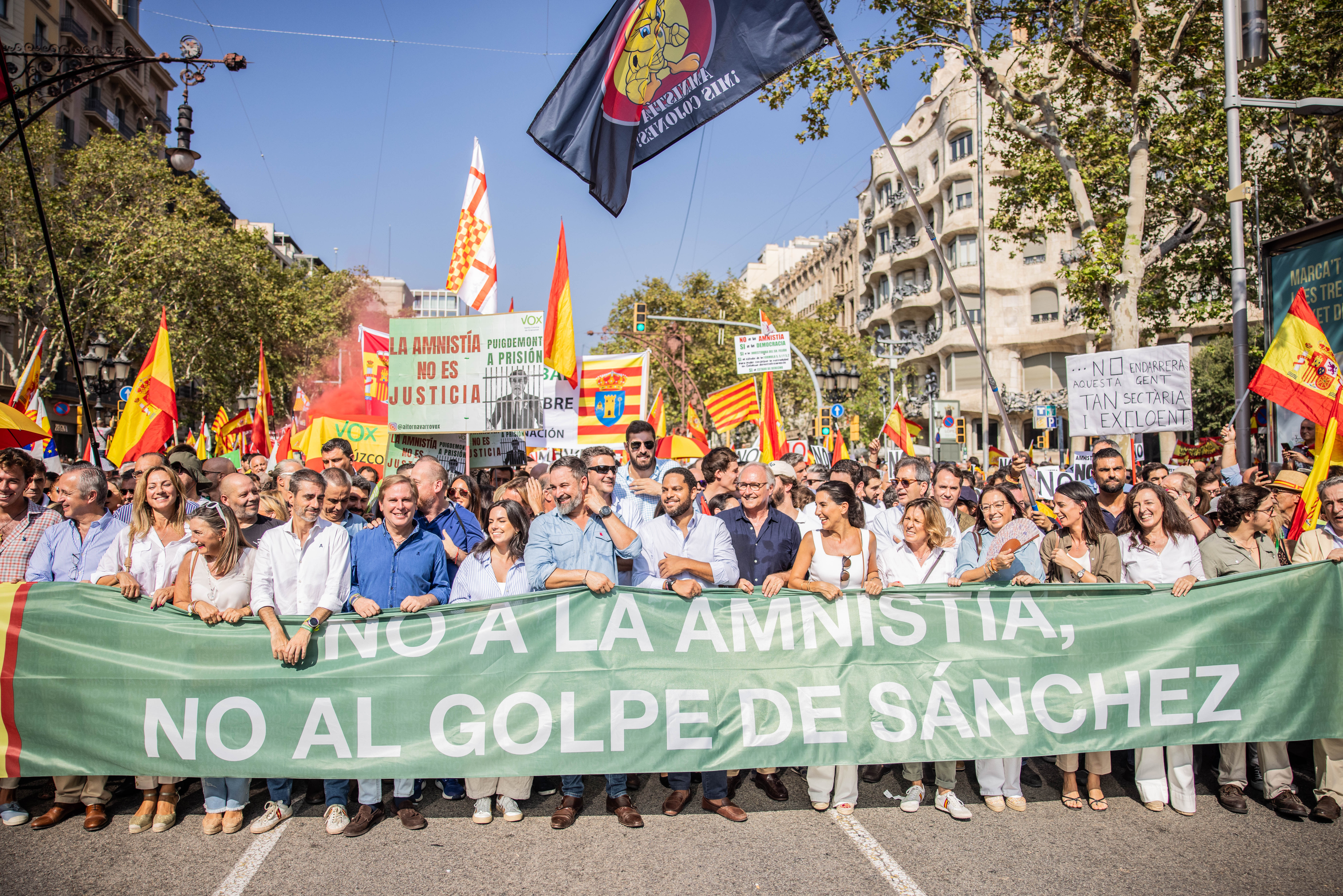
Preventive demonstrations against the amnesty in Madrid on 24 September 2023 (top) and in Barcelona on 8 October 2023 (bottom)

The People's Party (PP) called their first protest against a possible amnesty for the Catalan pro-independence supporters by Sánchez before Alberto Núñez Feijóo presented himself for investiture. The protest took place in the Plaza de Felipe II in Madrid on the morning of September 24. Feijóo was supported by former presidents José María Aznar and Mariano Rajoy, as well as by other PP barons such as Almeida and Ayuso. A delegation of the government of the Community of Madrid estimated that more than 40,000 people attended the event, while the PP put the number at 60,000. There was no official confirmation of the number who attended.

The acting vice-president Yolanda Díaz said about this event that the "proposal of the right wing is to set fire to Catalonia", while the president of the Generalitat of Catalonia, Pere Aragonès, said that the meeting of the PP was "a demonstration of hatred and revenge against Catalonia".

=== 28 October ===
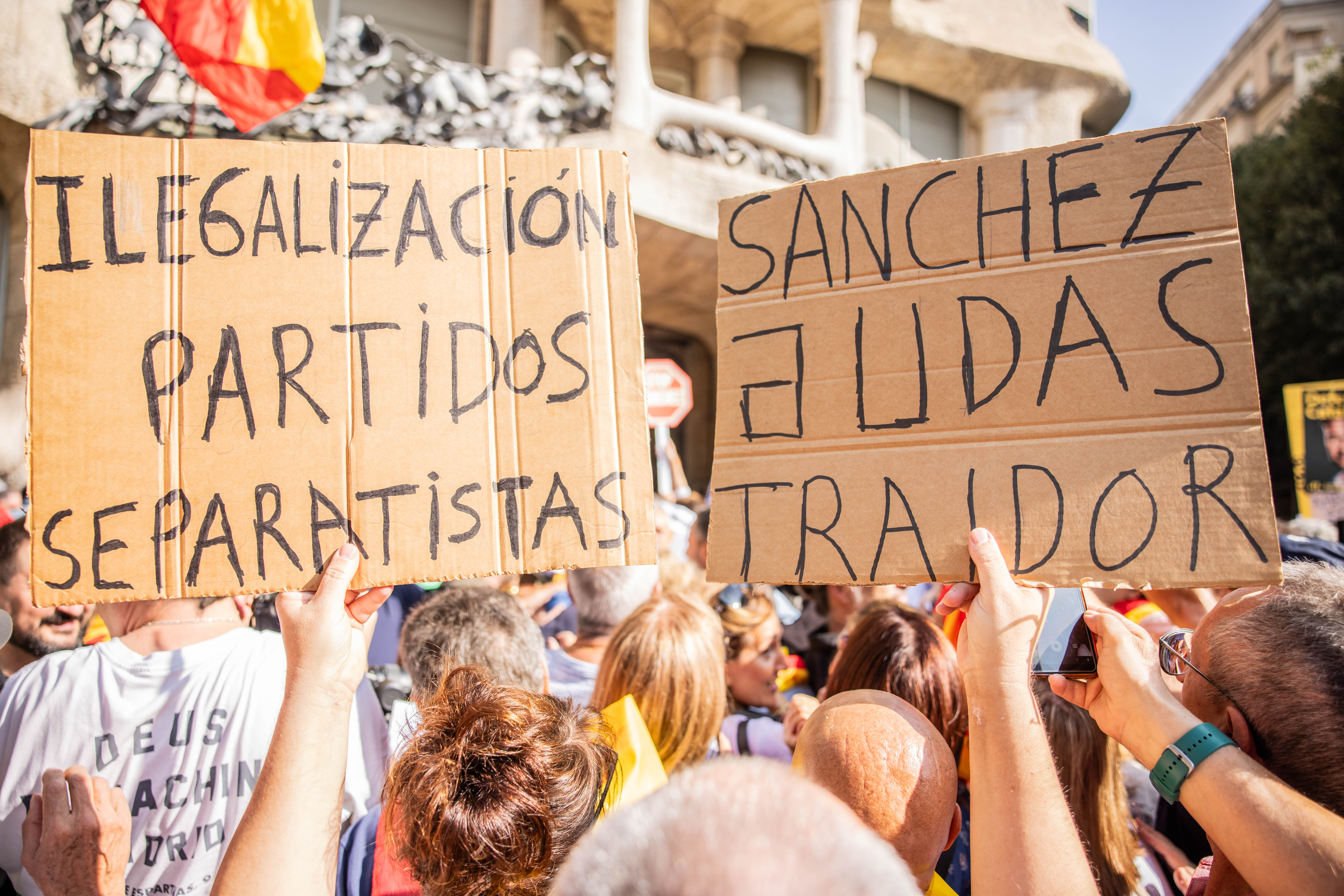
Signs of protesters criticising Sánchez and the Catalan independence movement at an SCC demonstration in Barcelona, 8 October 2023

Before negotiations by Sánchez to form a government, SCC called a demonstration in Barcelona against the amnesty proposal. Núñez Feijóo and Isabel Díaz Ayuso, of the PP, attended.

=== 29 October ===
After the amnesty was announced to be forming part of negotiations to form a Sánchez-led government, a protest organised by a group linked to the Vox party took place in the Plaza de Colón in Madrid. According to government of Madrid sources, 100,000 people attended.

Feijóo took part in a protest in Málaga with the president of Andalusia, Juanma Moreno of the PP, 11,000 people attended according to National Police.

=== 3–5 November ===
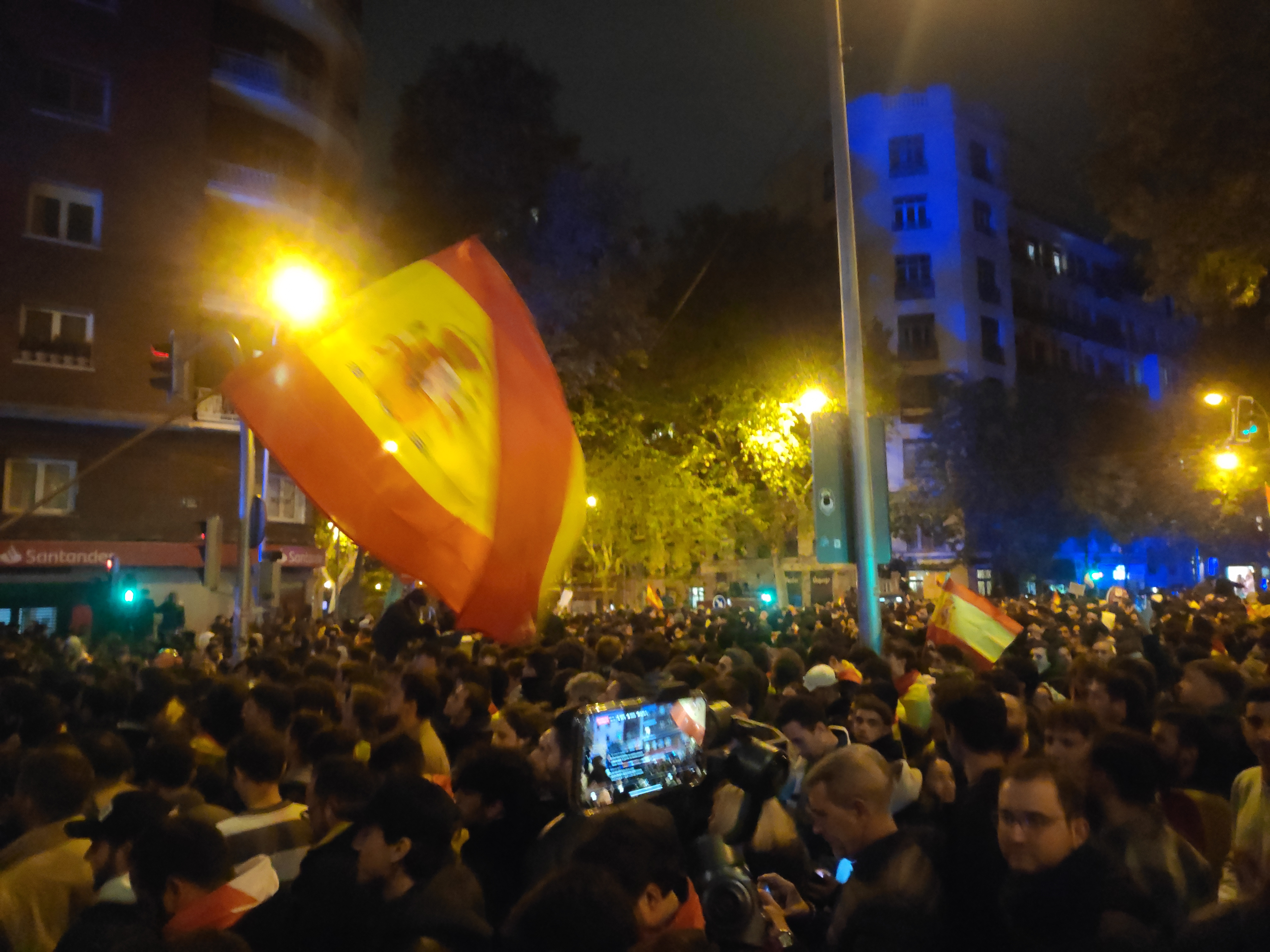
Ferraz street during the demonstrations

On 3–5 November, demonstrations were held at the PSOE headquarters in Calle de Ferraz. The PP distanced itself from these protests but the protests were supported by the Vox party. A thousand people were reported to be at the demonstration. Although the demonstration had not been communicated to the Government Delegation, the National Police was aware of it.

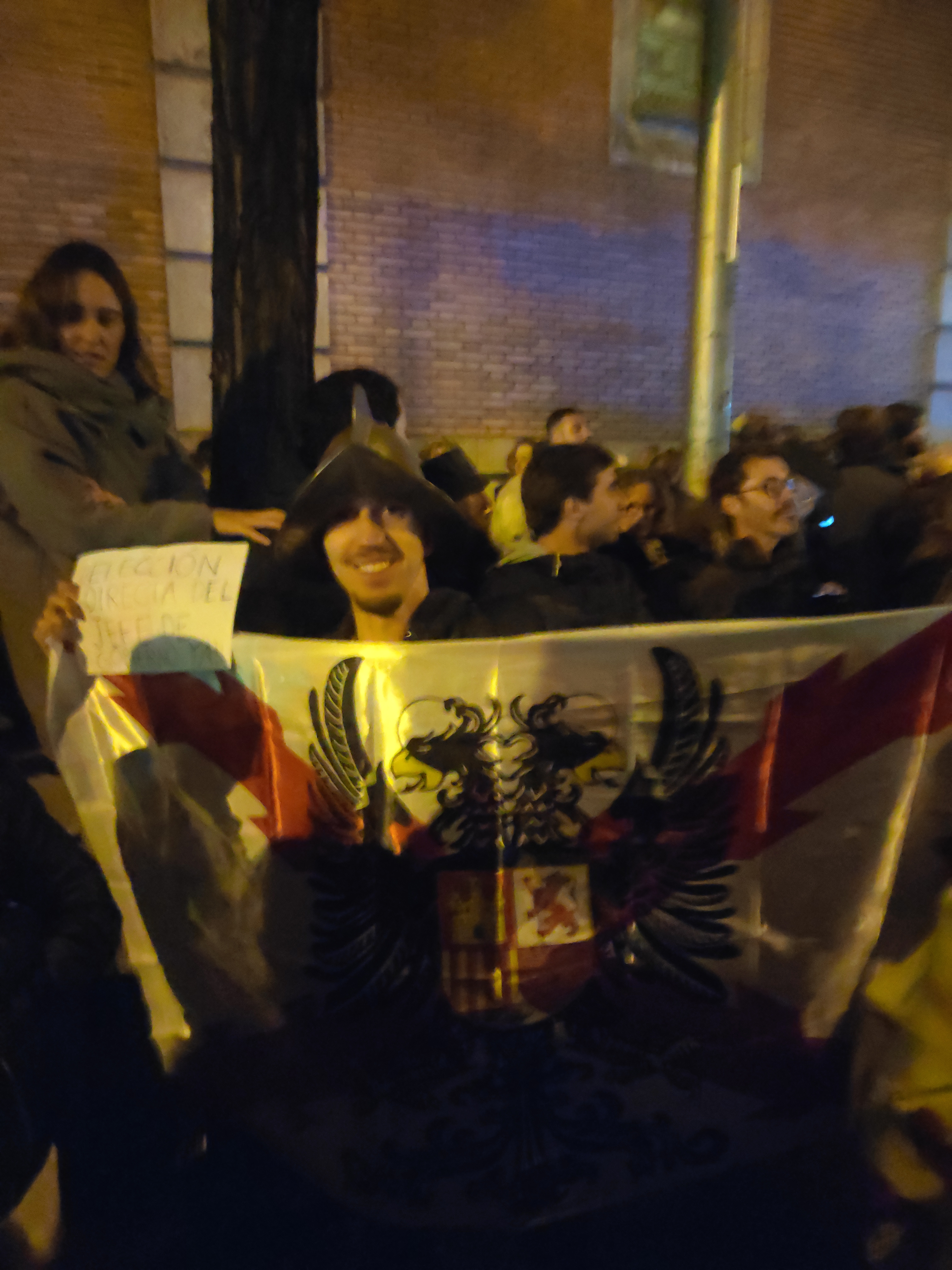
Demonstrator with a Spanish morion, a Cross of Burgundy with the double-headed eagle and a sign calling for the "direct election of the Head of Government".

On 4 November, the former president of the Senate of Spain Esperanza Aguirre of the PP called for the amnesty to be put to a national referendum. The same day, PSOE agreed to continue with the agreement with Sumar to form a government and to continue negotiating with the other parliamentary groups. On 5 November, protests were held in Barcelona, Burgos, Córdoba, León, Socuéllamos, Valencia, Vigo and Villareal.

=== 7 November ===
On 7 November, there were demonstrations in Madrid, Barcelona, Badajoz, Valencia, Seville, El Puerto de Santa Maria, Oviedo, Salamanca, Tarragona, Zaragoza, Leon and Murcia.

=== 9 November ===
Protests began in front of the PSOE headquarters on Thursday, involving multiple confrontations with the police. Tensions rose after protesters threw firecrackers at the police, and there were also reports of flares being thrown. Some protesters destroyed the fences that were protecting the headquarters of the PSOE and there were also people chanting "Puigdemont, to prison", "Let Txapote vote for you", and "Sánchez traitor". The protests were dispersed, with 24 arrests made and 7 police officers injured.

=== 11 November ===
Protests continued outside of the PSOE headquarters, with protesters throwing objects at the police. The police responded with rubber bullets and tear gas. When the police began to disperse crowds and arrest protestors, improvised sit-ins began on Marques de Urquijo Street. In total, 9 arrests were made and 3 people were injured.

=== 12 November ===
Protests were called for by the PP and Vox and a reported 52 cities held protests, additionally 1,000 people attended a protest outside the PSOE headquarters. In total, 13 arrests and there were reports of 6 people being injured. The following table shows the number of participants in the protests by city:

Territorios	Participants according to the Government Delegation and FCSE	Participants according to the organizers (Partido Popular)
Madrid	80,000	500,000
Castile and León	75,000	
Ávila	2,500	4,000
Burgos	5,000	
León	9,500	
Palencia	4,000	
Salamanca	21,000	
Segovia	4,000	
Soria	1,500	
Valladolid	25,000	
Zamora	2,500	
Valencia	24,000	
Alicante	20,000	
Castellón	4,500	
Andalucía	131,000	
Almería	12,500	
Cádiz	3,800	
Córdoba	20 000	30,000
Granada	30,000	
Jaén	10,000	
Huelva	5,000	
Sevilla	30,000	60,000
Málaga	30,000	52,000
Galicia	12,800	30,000
A Coruña	6,000	10 000
Pontevedra	4,000	10 000
Lugo	2,500	4,000
Ourense	300	4,000
Palma de Mallorca	10,000	13,000
Zaragoza	40,000	
Teruel	2,500	3,000
Huesca	3,000	3,000
Murcia	8,000 – 10 000	35,000
Cáceres	6,000	10,000
Badajoz	7,000	12,000
Pamplona	6,000	
Las Palmas	2,500	8,000
Oviedo	6,000 – 35,000	
Santander	15,000	20,000
Logroño	700	25,000

According to the Guàrdia Urbana de Barcelona, around 6,500 participants gathered against the amnesty in the Plaça Sant Jaume in Barcelona. The protest gathered various Spanish right-wing leadership, including Vox Secretary -General Ignacio Garriga, and Citizens MP Carlos Carrizosa.

The Valencia Government Delegation reported 4,500 protestors in Castellón, including Castellón mayor Begoña Carrasco. In Valencia, several people reportedly attacked journalist Matilde Alcaraz and her cameraman while covering the protests for À Punt.

=== 13 November ===
An estimated 80,000 people gathered in Madrid's Puerta del Sol square against the amnesty deal, while several thousand more gathered in cities across the country. Among the protesters was the PP leadership, including former prime minister José María Aznar, Madrid regional premier Isabel Díaz Ayuso, and Madrid Madrid Mayor Jose Luis Martinez-Almeida. Protesters were also present in the vicinity of the PSOE headquarters. Among those on Ferraz Street was Vox President Santiago Abascal, who was accompanied by American journalist and former Fox News anchor Tucker Carlson. In Valencia, protesters were limited to 100 outside the headquarters of the Socialist Party of the Valencian Country (PPSV), a regional branch of the PSOE.

Solidaridad, a trade union affiliated with Vox, called for a general strike for 24 November. The strike was deemed illegal by the Spanish government despite being postulated within the 10-day announcement limit as the nature of the protests was deemed to be strictly political and not related to labor demands, in violation of strike laws.

=== 14 November ===
There were protests outside of the PSOE headquarters on Ferraz Street. The Government Delegation reported 1,300 people there. Protesters placed 20 inflatable dolls in the front row of the protest to mock the PSOE as "not a political party, but a strip club". Protestors made anti-Sánchez chants to police to join their sides in the protests. There were also protesters outside of the Congress of Deputies.

It was reported that 10 student associations, affiliated with Vox, protested in front of the Complutense Faculty of Law, while a smaller number of students protested at the University of Barcelona's Faculty of Law. The number of protesters were reported between 50 and 100 in Complutense, while 20 were reported at the University of Barcelona.

Vox filed a complaint against Prime Minister Pedro Sánchez amidst his amnesty proposals to the Supreme Court of Spain for a precautionary suspension of his investiture, which did not happen. The petition was rejected by the Court, noting that Santiago Abascal forgot to state what crime Sánchez had committed and even who he was complaining against.

=== 15 November ===
Variation on the Spanish flag used by some protesters

Protests outside of the PSOE headquarters occurred with protesters carrying the flags of Spain and making anti-Puigdemont chants. The chants were similar to those from previous protests.

=== 16 November ===
A protest reported to be 4,000 people by DW protesting after Sanchez's re-election. The protesters were reported to have thrown flares and other objects at police, who issued warnings to the protesters.

=== 17 November ===
A reduction in the number of protestors was noted, as only around 1,000 protesters were reported on Ferraz Street in Madrid. The Unidades de Intervención Policial (UIP), a riot police sub-unit of the National Police Corps, oversaw the protests. Present at the protest were Vox politicians, including Vice President Javier Ortega Smith and Junta de Castilla y León Vice President Juan García Gallardo. According to the Union of Federal Police (UFP), Ortega attempted to coerce the UIP by "directing police to accommodate his own interests", as well as not presenting his credentials as a member of the Congress of Deputies to the UIP as he had done on 16 November. The UFP reneged Ortega for "abusing his condition as a Deputy", as well as making a statement that "these police are the same ones that defended your boss, Mr. Abascal". Ortega responded by stating that he had come with cameras to prevent violence in the protests. Ortega claimed he had information that some units of the UIP used excessive force that would "fall within the Penal Code as an abuse of authority". When the protests ended, a cleaning crew was required to clean up large quantities of litter, including alcohol containers and soda bottles.

=== 18 November ===
Protests continued as 170,000 people demonstrated in Madrid's Plaza de Cibeles, according to the Spanish Government Delegation. Protest organizers (including Vox president Santiago Abascal and People's Party president Alberto Núñez Feijóo) claimed close to 1 million people attended the protests. An estimated 3,000 people demonstrated outside the headquarters of the PSOE, while about 400 protesters marched towards the Palace of Moncloa through the A-6 highway, closing the road for about 1 hour. The bulk of the protesters were composed of Christian associations, supporters of the transition, and critics of the Spanish electoral system.

== Protests in 2024 ==
=== January ===
300 protesters celebrated the new year at Ferraz, during the act, the protesters hung up and hit a doll of Pedro Sánchez characterized with Nazi symbols. The protest was recorded by the far-right YouTuber Isaac Parejo and the journalist María Durán. The videos were transmitted by a Youtube channel live. Every important political party of Spain, including PP and Vox, rejected the act and the PSOE denounced the participants of the protests for hate crimes, and solicited an investigation for find the organizations that financed the act, but before the investigation started, the PSOE detected a Vox network of influence on the protesters. During the investigation, the police questioned Antonio Martínez Vázquez as organizer of the protest, but he only declared that he just helped an organization linked to Vox, and he did not know about the beating of the doll. After the investigation, the police removed Antonio Martínez from the "blacklist" and they pointed to Pablo González Gasca, one of the leaders of the protests and Vox member. On 1 January one hundred people tried to calm down the protests with mariachis.

On 4 January, one hundred protesters headed to the Palacio de Cibeles, many of them, Vox supporters. These protesters showed support to Ortega Smith, a Vox member who was expelled from the City Council of Madrid. The protesters were marching meanwhile shouting "PSOE, PP, la misma mierda es" ("PSOE, PP, are the same shit"). The next day, the protesters grabbed another doll of Pedro Sánchez to hit it as they did on Ferraz on 1 January.

In 2024 the number of protesters went down and the main newspapers started to give less coverage to the protests. These reasons led to twenty protesters meeting on 7 January to decide the strategy to follow, with doubts about Vox's actions and supporting Díaz Ayuso's posture.

In Valencia, the number of protests dropped so much that Carlos Sanz, a local PP mayor, screamed at those who were protesting in front of the PSPV headquarters with a "Llevo respetando [a los manifestantes] tres meses, pero sois cuatro gatos y ensuciáis a la derecha española" ("I have been respecting [the protesters] for three months, but you are just four cats and you are making the Spanish right dirty").

On 10 January, PP and Vox each presented an amendment in congress, and both were rejected. The leader of the PP organized a protest in Madrid for 28 January, but Vox did not participate. 45,000 to 70,000 protesters gathered in Ferraz and protested with two dolls: one of the president Pedro Sanchez, and the other of Carles Puigdemont.

=== February ===
The 26th Court of Madrid began investigating the New Year's Eve events on 12 February. A day later, the Judicial Ethics Committee, an independent body of the judiciary's governing bodies, endorsed the protests some judges made in November of the previous year against the amnesty, as long as the act is "honest, thoughtful, and sincere conviction" and that the action objected to "could affect the Rule of Law."

On the 16th, Judge Concepción Jerez closed the investigation into the events surrounding the piñata that simulated Pedro Sánchez because "lack of education is not a crime." The PSOE decided to appeal the decision.

On 20 February, the Cortes Generales approved a fifteen-day extension for the Justice Committee to issue a report on the amnesty law. Two days later, the opposition leader and president of the PP, Núñez Feijóo, announced another series of protests against the law.

== See also ==
- 2024–2025 Spanish anti-tourism protests
- 2026 Spanish housing protests
