= Isabel Peralta =

Spanish neo-Nazi activist (born 2002)

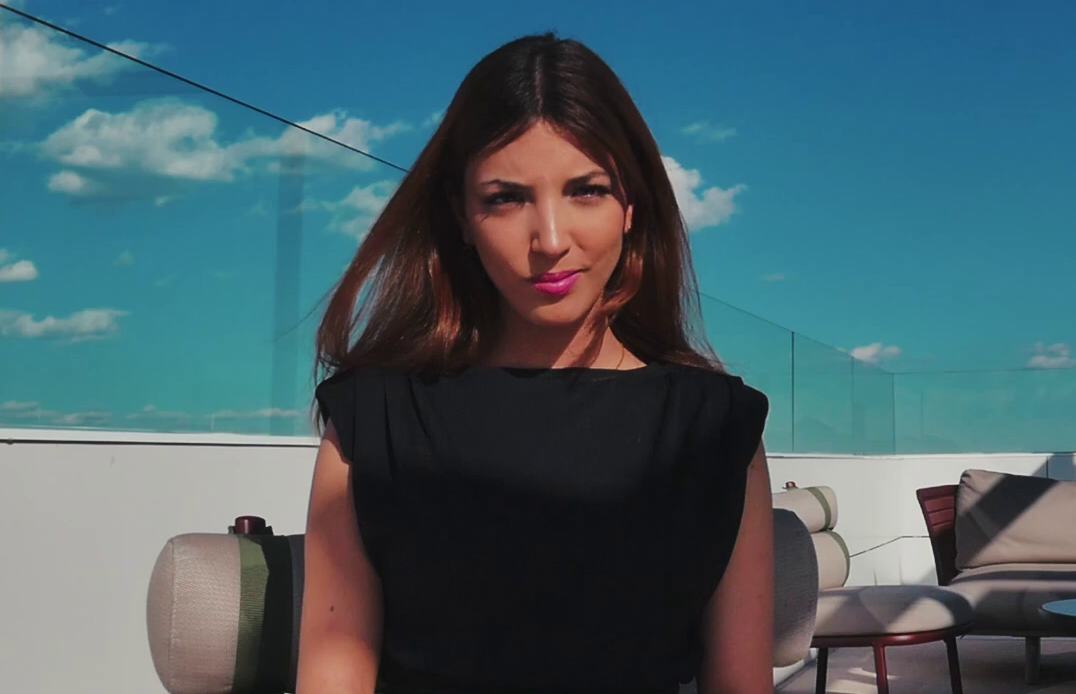
Peralta in 2024

María Isabel Medina Peralta (born 2002) is a Spanish far-right activist who is self-declared as a "national socialist", fascist and falangist. She came to public attention at age 18 in February 2021 after making a speech against Jews at an event in honour of the Blue Division. Three months later, she spoke at a demonstration outside the Moroccan embassy, for which she was convicted of hate speech and sentenced to a year in prison in April 2025. In March 2022 she was deported from Germany and banned for life from the country, with authorities describing her as "a danger for security and public order".

== Early life and family ==
Peralta is the daughter of Juan Manuel Medina, a pundit on Ana Rosa Quintana's El programa de Ana Rosa. Medina was elected to the town council in Seseña in the Province of Toledo in 2008 in representation of the People's Party (PP). In 2011, it was revealed that in the 1990s he had been a member of the Alianza por la Unidad Nacional, a far-right party. Peralta said that she first identified with the extreme right at age 13. According to Peralta, she was expelled from her father's house in 2019 to live with her mother, a Buddhist abbess who did not support Peralta's ideology but could tolerate it. The following year, Medina expelled Peralta again, when she went to the Valley of the Fallen to pay tribute to José Antonio Primo de Rivera, the founder of Falangism. In 2019, she began studying history at the Complutense University of Madrid, and joined Sindicato Español Universitario, a Falangist student society that was linked to FE-La Falange; in 2022 she called the SEU a "respectable organisation".

== Activism ==
As an activist in FE-La Falange, she led its women's branch, which was modelled on the Sección Femenina and in 2020, she helped found the neo-Nazi group Bastión Frontal.

In February 2021, 18-year-old Peralta made international headlines at an authorised event in Madrid, in which she wore the blue shirt of the Falange and made a speech in tribute to the Blue Division, Spanish volunteers in the Nazi invasion of the Soviet Union. She said: "The enemy is always going to be the same one, albeit with different masks: the Jew." An investigation was opened into her actions but was closed by a judge.

Peralta attended an unauthorised protest in May 2021 at the Moroccan embassy in Madrid, in which she called for "death to the invader". In April 2025, she was convicted of provoking discrimination and hatred, and given a prison sentence of one year and a fine of €1,080. Peralta argued in court that she was not the leader of the neo-Nazi group Bastión Frontal and that she believed the event to be legitimate as it had allegedly been organised by social media personality and later Member of the European Parliament Alvise Pérez. Bastión Frontal, which had around fifty members, chose to dissolve in September 2022 due to financial issues and criminal investigations concerning Peralta and co-leader Rodrigo Miguélez. Peralta's sentence was upheld on appeal by the High Court of Justice of Madrid in July 2026.

In September 2021, the Simon Wiesenthal Center reported that Peralta moved to Germany on a scholarship with far-right party the Third Way in Düsseldorf. The following March, after arriving at Frankfurt Airport with a Nazi flag and a copy of Mein Kampf, she was detained and deported. In January 2023, Germany banned Peralta for life from entering the country, citing security reasons. Spanish television channel LaSexta featured an interview with Peralta for a documentary on far-right extremism in November 2021. The broadcast was condemned by Israel's embassy in Spain. In 2023, Peralta was questioned by police under anti-terror legislation before being allowed into the United Kingdom, to speak at an event by British nationalist journal Heritage and Destiny, edited by Mark Cotterill.

Peralta joined Núcleo Nacional in 2025. In August 2026, she spoke in front of the Moroccan embassy in Madrid during a protest denouncing Moroccan immigration and Spanish political corruption relaying to the 2026 Morocco–Spain border incident.

== Political views ==
In an interview with El Mundo on 17 February 2021, Peralta self-identified as a Falangist, a JONSist, fascist, and as a "national socialist" (while criticising the more common term "Nazi"). She has been described as a Holocaust denier, and as an opponent of democracy, immigration, homosexuality, feminism, fat acceptance and anti-racism. In the same interview with El Mundo, she condemned Spain's main far-right party Vox for not being extreme enough, saying "they disgust me more than [far-left] Podemos". In 2025, she called the Alternative for Germany "the only party in Germany with a Jewish clique" and decried Giorgia Meloni as the prime minister who had brought the most immigrants to Italy.

She is an admirer of historical fascist and Nazi figures, including Ramiro Ledesma Ramos, Benito Mussolini, Adolf Hitler, and Giovanni Gentile, as well as esoteric neo-Nazi writer Miguel Serrano. She also holds José Antonio Primo de Rivera in high regard and says she visits the Valley of the Fallen each year to honour him.

Regarding former dictator Francisco Franco, Peralta said in interviews has said that she considers him an "efficient and useful" and a "really good politician", she also criticised his ideas as not being useful in society and not healthy in the long term. She said in 2022 "I do not consider myself a Francoist" and accused the dictator of forming a pact with Zionists and opening the doors to Freemasonry.
