= 2024 Spanish Amnesty Law =

2017 Catalan independence referendum related amnesty

2024 Amnesty Law

Cortes Generales
- Long title: Organic Law 1/2024, of 10 June, of amnesty for the institutional, political, and social normalization in Catalonia
- Citation: BOE-A-2024-11776
- Enacted by: Congress of Deputies
- Enacted by: Senate
- Assented to by: Felipe VI
- Royal assent: 10 June 2024
- Holding: BOE-A-2024-11776
- Effective: 11 June 2024

Legislative history

Initiating chamber: Congress of Deputies
- Introduced by: PSOE
- Introduced: 13 November 2023
- Passed: 14 March 2024
- Voting summary: 178 voted for; 172 voted against

Revising chamber: Senate
- Rejected: 14 May 2024
- Voting summary: 113 voted for; 149 voted against; 1 absent

Final stages
- Senate rejection considered by the Congress of Deputies: 30 May 2024
- Voting summary: 177 voted for; 172 voted against; 1 absent

Related cases
- Constitutional Court
- Status: In force

The 2024 Spanish Amnesty Law (officially, the Organic Law 1/2024, of 10 June, of amnesty for the institutional, political, and social normalization in Catalonia) is an organic law of Spain that was approved on 30 May 2024 and entered into force on 11 June, the same day of its publication in the Official State Gazette. It was registered as a bill in the Congress of Deputies on 13 November 2023 by the Spanish Socialist Workers' Party (PSOE) with support from Sumar, Republican Left of Catalonia (ERC), Junts, EH Bildu, the Basque Nationalist Party (PNV) and the Galician Nationalist Bloc (BNG). The initiative derived from investiture agreements between the Spanish Socialist Workers’ Party (PSOE) and Esquerra Republicana de Catalunya, and between PSOE and Together for Catalunya (Junts), formalized on 2 and 9 November 2023, respectively.

The law grants amnesty for legal proceedings and convictions connected to events arising from the Catalan independence process (procés), including the consultation of 9 November 2014, the independence referendum of 1 October 2017—declared unlawful by Spain's Constitutional Court—and the subsequent unilateral declaration of independence.

Upon presentation of the bill to the media, acting Minister of the Presidency Félix Bolaños described it as "deeply constitutional", intended to "guarantee political coexistence" and "heal wounds", and stated that it had the backing of 178 deputies—those from the parliamentary groups committed to supporting Pedro Sánchez's investiture, except Coalición Canaria. The People's Party (PP) and Vox stated their opposition, arguing that the measure contravened the Constitution, the rule of law, and the separation of powers. On 12 November 2023, the PP organized demonstrations in Spain's fifty provincial capitals and in Ceuta and Melilla, reported to have drawn hundreds of thousands of participants. Vox also promoted repeated rallies outside the PSOE headquarters on Calle Ferraz in Madrid; press accounts noted the presence of Francoist symbols and slogans, and police intervened on multiple occasions, including the night of 12 November.

The amnesty law was key in securing the support of Together for Catalonia's 7 MPs to Pedro Sánchez's investiture to a third term as prime minister of Spain following the 2023 Spanish general election and the ensuing government formation negotiations. The law proposal sparked numerous protests across the streets.

According to some estimates, the amnesty will affect some 350 people involved in legal proceedings related to the Catalan independence process, as well as 73 police officers prosecuted for their actions during the illegal 2017 Catalan independence referendum, or in the days before or after.

On 26 June 2025, the Constitutional Court of Spain dismissed the appeal filed by the opposition People's Party (PP) and declared the law fully constitutional by six votes to four.

== Background ==
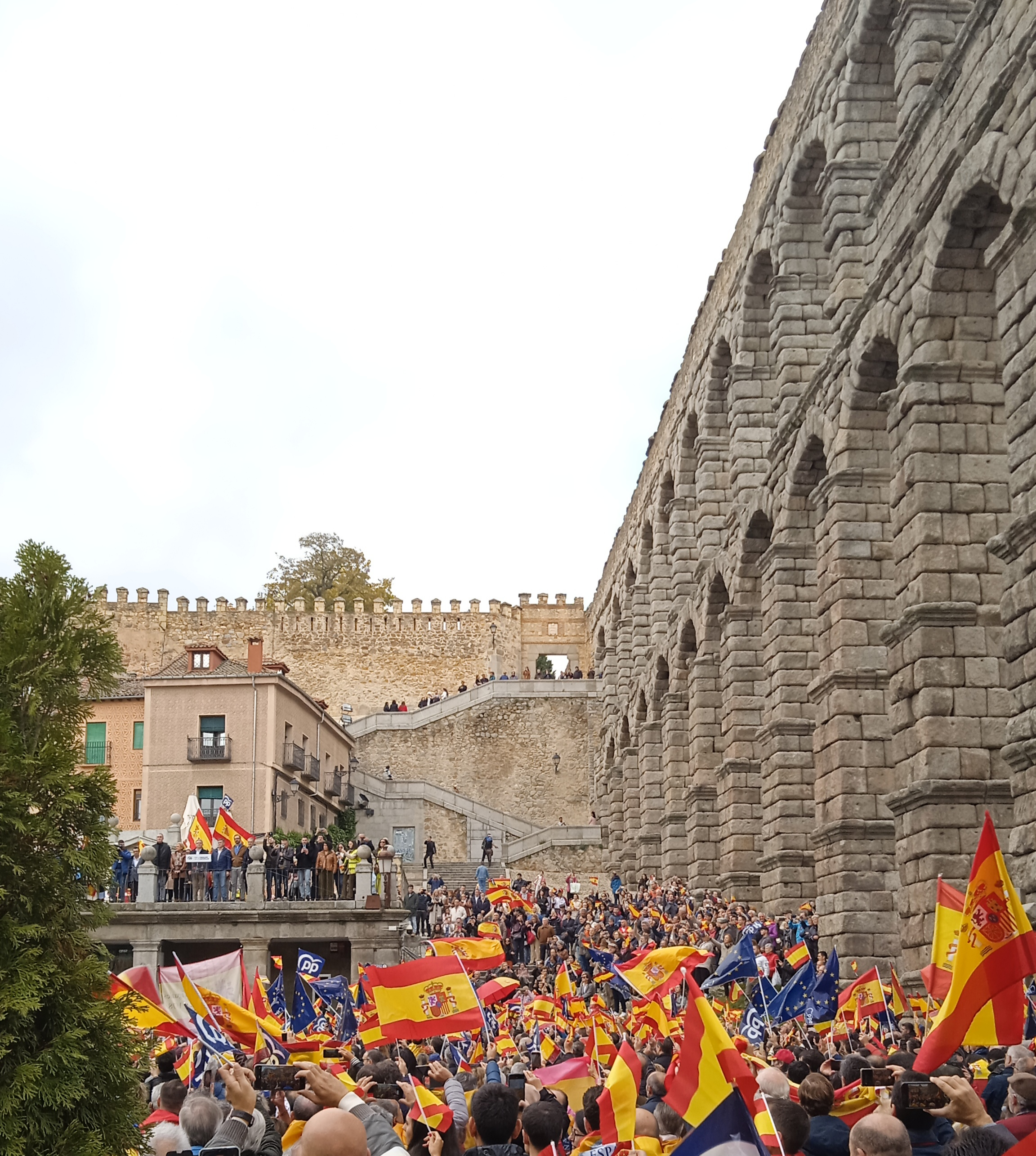
Protests against the amnesty next to the Segovia Aqueduct on November 12

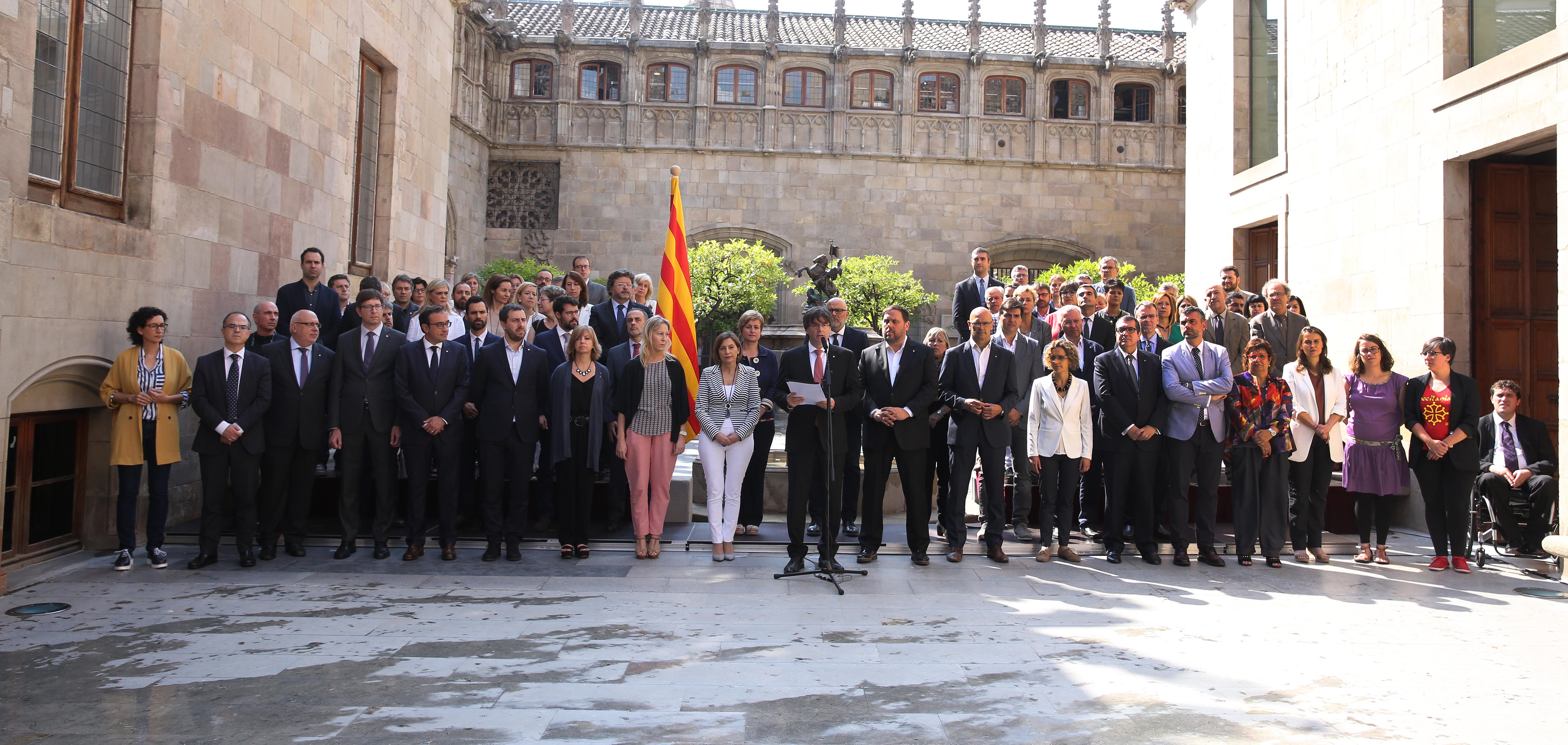
Presentation of the October 1, 2017 independence referendum by Carles Puigdemont and his government team (2017).

=== Pardons for pro-independence leaders (2021) ===
On 22 June 2021, the coalition government of the Spanish Socialist Workers’ Party (PSOE) and Unidas Podemos, led by Prime Minister Pedro Sánchez and supported in parliament by fifteen deputies of Esquerra Republicana de Catalunya (ERC), granted pardons to those convicted in the trial of the procés, including ERC president Oriol Junqueras, who had been imprisoned for more than three years. Following the announcement, the president of the Generalitat, Pere Aragonès (ERC), delivered an institutional statement reiterating demands for amnesty and a self-determination referendum, stating that it was "time to put an end to repression" and that the pardons "help to generate credibility on the path to negotiation", which he characterized as an implicit recognition that the convictions were unjust. Junts parliamentary spokesperson Mònica Sales expressed skepticism about dialogue with the central government and rejected the view that the pardons strengthened prospects for negotiation.

On 13 June 2021, demonstrations were held in Madrid's Plaza de Colón against the anticipated pardons. Leaders of Vox (Santiago Abascal), the People's Party (Pablo Casado), and Ciudadanos (Albert Rivera) attended separately to avoid repeating the previous year's "Colón photo". Rosa Díez, head of Unión 78, the organizing platform, stated that the government of Pedro Sánchez constituted "an exclusionary, sectarian, and dangerous power" and would violate the Constitution if it granted pardons to "criminals". Writer Andrés Trapiello read a manifesto describing the government as "inept, parasitic, and authoritarian" and the potential pardons as a "serious attack" on democracy.

On 23 June 2021, the nine convicted leaders of the procés were released from prison, carrying a banner reading "Freedom for Catalonia" and an Estelada flag. Some described the pardons as insufficient and called for an amnesty. The pardons did not lift the disqualification penalties, which continued to bar them from public office for the duration of the original terms. At the time, the prime minister and officials of the Spanish Socialist Workers’ Party stated that neither an amnesty nor a self-determination referendum was compatible with the Constitution.

=== Abolition of the crime of sedition (2022) ===
On 11 November 2022, the parliamentary groups of the PSOE and Unidas Podemos introduced a bill to repeal the offence of sedition (maximum penalty of 15 years) and replace it with aggravated public disorder (maximum of five years), and to reduce penalties for embezzlement when committed without personal gain to a maximum of four years (previously twelve).\[20]\[21] These offences formed the basis of convictions for leaders who remained in Spain and charges against those who left the country. Prime Minister Pedro Sánchez described the proposals as "risky" but necessary to address the territorial conflict in Catalonia. Processed under the urgent procedure, the bill was debated and approved by the Congress of Deputies on 15 December 2022; during the session the People's Party filed a recurso de amparo with the Constitutional Court seeking suspension of the sitting, a decision the court deferred until 19 December.

On 22 December 2022, the Senate ratified the reform approved by the Congress of Deputies. During the debate, Socialist spokesperson José María Oleaga stated that the amendments sought to align Spanish criminal law with other European jurisdictions and to promote coexistence and reconciliation in Catalonia. People's Party spokesperson Javier Maroto criticized the reform, urged PSOE senators to break party discipline, and accused Prime Minister Pedro Sánchez of reneging on campaign commitments while affirming Sánchez's democratic legitimacy. The debate also highlighted divisions within the pro-independence camp: Esquerra Republicana de Catalunya supported the reform—Mireia Cortès argued it reduced the state's punitive capacity—while Junts opposed it, contending that support would imply acknowledging the illegality of the 2017 secessionist challenge.

=== General elections in July 2023 ===
On 23 July 2023, general elections were held in Spain. The People’s Party (PP) won a plurality with 136 seats, later increased to 137 after the overseas vote in Madrid, but the PP and Vox did not secure an absolute majority. PP leader Alberto Núñez Feijóo declared victory, asserted a “right to form a government,” and asked the PSOE not to block it. Vox leader Santiago Abascal acknowledged the right-of-centre bloc’s failure to reach a majority and stated that Pedro Sánchez could be invested with the support of “communism, coup-plotting separatists, and terrorism.” PSOE leader Pedro Sánchez told supporters that “the bloc of regression has failed” and said Spain would “move forward.” The following day he stated that he was confident “this democracy will find the formula for governability.”

On election night, Junts stated that it would not support Pedro Sánchez’s investiture “in exchange for nothing” and demanded an amnesty and a self-determination referendum. The following day, party secretary-general Jordi Turull said Junts’ votes would be used to address the political conflict between the state and Catalonia. On 24 July 2023, PSC leader Salvador Illa said on RAC 1 that, from the standpoint of the rule of law, an amnesty was not feasible. On 25 July, acting government spokesperson Isabel Rodríguez expressed a similar position, stating that only the constitutional framework was acceptable in Catalonia and in Spain as a whole. On the final day of the election campaign, Sánchez answered “No” when asked in a television interview whether he would grant a referendum or an amnesty in exchange for support in an investiture vote, adding that the independence movement had not received an amnesty and that the conditional pardons maintained disqualification penalties for some leaders of the procés.

On 4 September, Sumar leader and acting deputy prime minister Yolanda Díaz met Carles Puigdemont in Brussels, where he has resided since October 2017 after leaving Spain to avoid arrest and trial. The meeting, widely reported by the media, was the first public encounter between a member of the Spanish government and the former president of the Generalitat and Junts leader. The socialist wing of the government stated that Díaz attended in her capacity as Sumar leader, while the People’s Party and Vox criticized the meeting.

On 5 September 2023, Carles Puigdemont stated in Brussels that Junts’ support for the investiture of Pedro Sánchez—or of Alberto Núñez Feijóo, then tasked by the king to attempt to form a government—was contingent on prior passage of an amnesty law, recognition of a “political conflict,” and a commitment to explore a self-determination referendum. He added, “If there is an agreement, it must be a historic agreement, a historic commitment that no Spanish regime or government has been able to achieve since the fall of Barcelona on 11 September 1714.”

Following Alberto Núñez Feijóo’s unsuccessful investiture (172 votes in favour, 177 against), King Felipe VI nominated Pedro Sánchez to attempt to form a government on 3 October 2023. On 6 October Sánchez publicly referred to “amnesty” in the context of negotiations with Catalan pro-independence parties for investiture support. After signing a pact with Sumar on 24 October to re-establish the coalition government, Sánchez formalized his position at the PSOE Federal Committee meeting on 28 October, arguing that an amnesty was necessary “in the interests of Spain and in defense of coexistence among Spaniards,” a stance endorsed by the committee. PSC leader Salvador Illa expressed support, describing amnesty as “an exceptional measure to restore full political normality in Catalonia and Spain.”

On 2 November 2023, Félix Bolaños (PSOE) and Oriol Junqueras (Esquerra Republicana de Catalunya) signed an investiture agreement that included an amnesty law, the transfer of Rodalies commuter rail services, and the write-off of €15 billion of Generalitat debt to the state. On 9 November, the PSOE–Junts agreement was published, also providing for an amnesty for those prosecuted in proceedings related to the procés. On 10 November, the PSOE and the Basque Nationalist Party (PNV) signed an investiture pact—signed by Pedro Sánchez for the PSOE and Andoni Ortuzar for the PNV—and, the same day, the PSOE reached an agreement with Coalición Canaria, which did not support the amnesty. With these accords, Sánchez secured 179 votes for the investiture scheduled for 15–16 November 2023.

== Content ==
The law comprises an explanatory memorandum divided into six sections, 16 articles grouped into three titles, and three final provisions; the initial bill instead contained two additional provisions and one final provision.

Point II of the explanatory memorandum states that the law grants amnesty for acts declared or classified as crimes, or as conduct giving rise to administrative or accounting liability, linked to the Catalan consultation of 9 November 2014 and the referendum of 1 October 2017—both declared unconstitutional by Constitutional Court judgments 31/2015 (25 February) and 114/2017 (17 October)—committed between 1 November 2011 (1 January 2012 in the initial bill) and 13 November 2023.

=== Explanatory memorandum ===
I

[Amnesty] is established in the legal system as an appropriate means of addressing exceptional political circumstances which, within a state governed by the rule of law, pursue the achievement of a general interest, such as the need to overcome and channel deep-rooted political and social conflicts, in the quest to improve coexistence and social cohesion, as well as to integrate diverse political sensibilities.

Amnesty has been used on numerous occasions in our legal tradition. It is not a novel approach and has many precedents in Spain. The most important, but not the only one, is the Amnesty Law of 1977 (Law 46/1977, of October 15). Furthermore, it is recognized in the constitutional order of many of the countries in our geographical area and legal sphere of influence. [...] There are also other constitutional provisions in European countries which, although they do not expressly mention amnesty, as in the case of Germany, Austria, Belgium, Ireland, and Sweden, this has not prevented their constitutionality from being affirmed. [...] From the perspective of European Union law, the institution of amnesty is perfectly standardized."

II

The events linked to the independence process "led to institutional tension that resulted in the intervention of the judiciary and social and political tension that caused a substantial part of Catalan society to become disaffected with state institutions, which has not yet disappeared and is repeatedly reignited when the multiple legal consequences that continue to arise, especially in the criminal sphere, become apparent.

"During this time, the Spanish Parliament has played a leading role in shaping the response of popular sovereignty to this independence process. A role that this organic law reaffirms... Thus, with this organic amnesty law, the Spanish Parliament is once again resorting to a constitutional mechanism that reinforces the rule of law in order to provide an adequate response more than ten years after the start of the independence process, when the most acute moments of the crisis have already passed and it is time to lay the foundations for ensuring peaceful coexistence in the future. In this way, by taking this legislative policy decision, the Spanish Parliament is not only not encroaching on other areas, but, on the contrary, in exercising its powers, is taking the best possible approach to addressing a political conflict through politics. [...]

"With the approval of this organic law, the legislator therefore intends to exempt the application of current regulations to events that took place in the context of the Catalan independence process in the general interest, which is to guarantee coexistence within the rule of law and to create a social, political, and institutional context that promotes economic stability and cultural and social progress both in Catalonia and in Spain as a whole, while at the same time serving as a basis for overcoming political conflict. [...] Thus, this amnesty cannot be interpreted as a departure from our legal framework. On the contrary, it is a tool that strengthens it and looks to the future...

"This organic law is another step on a difficult but courageous and conciliatory path; a demonstration of respect for citizens and of the fact that the application of the law is necessary but, on occasions, insufficient to resolve a long-standing political conflict. Therefore, this amnesty constitutes a political decision adopted under the principle of justice, with the understanding that the instruments available to a state governed by the rule of law are not, and should not be, immutable; since it is the law that serves society and not the other way around, and therefore it must be able to be updated and adapted to the context of each moment."

III

"The legal and political context in which this amnesty is being approved is very different from that in which the last two laws implementing this measure in our country were approved. [...] Since 1978, Spain has had a constitution comparable to those of neighboring countries, which guarantees individual fundamental rights and preserves the ideological and political rights of all... In accordance with this framework, an amnesty law can only be based on the strength of the democratic system, which thus demonstrates its capacity for reconciliation through a sovereign act of the Cortes Generales, whose legitimacy is based on two pillars of a different nature: on the one hand, the constitutionality of the measure and, on the other, the need to address an exceptional situation in the general interest, committing to a future of understanding, dialogue, and negotiation between different political, ideological, and national sensibilities.

"This is the general legal framework within which this amnesty law is conceived, with the clear understanding that, although there can be no democracy outside the rule of law, it is necessary to create the conditions for politics, dialogue, and parliamentary channels to play a leading role in the search for solutions to a political issue that has been a recurring feature of our history. [...] This process is also inspired by the Constitutional Court's interpretation of the political obligations of public authorities, stating that "the Constitution does not and cannot expressly address all the problems that may arise in the constitutional order [...]. Therefore, it is the public authorities, and especially the territorial powers that make up our autonomous state, who are called upon to resolve the problems that arise in this area through dialogue and cooperation" (ruling 42/2014, of March 24).

IV

"The constitutionality of amnesty was affirmed by the Constitutional Court of Spain in its ruling 147/1986, dated November 25, 1986, specifically regarding the application of the Law 46/1977. This ruling explicitly states that "there is no direct constitutional restriction on this matter." The Constitution of Spain does not prohibit the legal institution of amnesty but only a specific form of the right of grace, namely general pardons, which have a distinctly different legal nature from an organic amnesty law, as pardons are an executive prerogative. The same ruling 147/1986 elaborates on this, stating that "it is erroneous to reason about pardons and amnesty as figures whose difference is merely quantitative, as they are in a relationship of qualitative differentiation."

"It is reasonable to infer that the 1978 constitutional framers did not prohibit the institution of amnesty. This allows us to conclude that amnesty, far from being unconstitutional, forms part of the foundational pact of Spanish democracy and is a prerogative of the Cortes Generales, which represent the entire Spanish people, the holder of national sovereignty."

"It should be emphasized that amnesty does not affect the principle of separation of powers or the exclusivity of jurisdiction provided for in Article 117 of the Constitution, as the judiciary is subject to the rule of law. An organic law, within the parameters outlined, provides for exemptions from liability, and it is the responsibility of judges, courts, the Court of Auditors, or administrative authorities handling or having handled proceedings, processes, files, and cases affected by the amnestied acts to apply it to each specific case. This has been implicitly recognized in Spain's legal system, which routinely incorporates the concept of amnesty in various provisions."

"Lastly, it is noteworthy that amnesty is contemplated in over thirty international agreements signed by Spain concerning the transfer of convicted persons or extraditions, with more than twenty of these having the status of treaties or international conventions, implying prior review of their full constitutionality."

V

"The principle of equality does not require the amnesty to have universal scope but rather ensures no discrimination among individuals covered by the enabling conditions of the law (in this case, acts leading to various types of liability related to the Catalan independence process). As clarified by the highest interpreter of the Constitution, the principle of equality applies when there is a "substantial identity of legal situations," and no comparison can be made "between legal situations that were not equated by the norms creating them" (ruling 194/1999, October 25, 1999), based on the principles of justification and reasonableness (rulings 62/1982, October 15, 1982; 112/1996, June 24, 1996; 102/1999, May 31, 1999). This organic law respects the principle of equality by objectively and justifiably defining its scope in accordance with constitutional values, without arbitrarily excluding cases with substantial identity."

"Framed as a singular law addressing an exceptional situation, this organic amnesty law is guided by the principles of reasonableness, proportionality, and adequacy. Its reasonableness stems from the objective and reasonable justification of its singularity, linked to the need to overcome the high political tension in Catalan society, particularly intense since 2011 (2012 in the initial bill). This approach returns the resolution of the political conflict to the channels of political discussion. The law's proportionality derives from the specificity of the acts declared or classified as crimes and behaviors to be amnestied, linked to acts within a defined timeframe. This connects to the principle of adequacy and the law's purpose, tied to the optimization mandate of Article 9 of the Constitution, (Note: Article 9. 1. Citizens and public authorities are subject to the Constitution and the rest of the legal system. 2. It is incumbent upon public authorities to promote conditions so that the freedom and equality of individuals and the groups they form are real and effective; to remove obstacles that prevent or hinder their full realization; and to facilitate the participation of all citizens in political, economic, cultural, and social life. 3. The Constitution guarantees the principle of legality, normative hierarchy, the publication of norms, the non-retroactivity of unfavorable or restrictive sanctioning provisions, legal certainty, responsibility, and the prohibition of arbitrary actions by public authorities.) which applies to all public authorities, particularly the legislator, who defines criminal offenses, repeals them, and, as in this case, approves an amnesty law with a legitimate and constitutional purpose. This purpose, due to its legal nature or the variety of ongoing legal proceedings at the time of enactment, could not be achieved through other legal mechanisms such as pardons or Penal Code reforms."

VI

The law consists of 16 articles, divided into three titles, and three final provisions (two additional provisions and one final provision in the initial bill).

Regarding Article 1.1, it should be clarified that extending amnesty to criminal acts potentially committed in defense of legality and constitutional order does not imply any discredit or reproach to the affected groups. It does not criminalize public officials who acted in defense of public order, as the presumption of innocence is a fundamental principle of the Spanish legal system. Instead, it aims to alleviate the legal situation of those prosecuted and thereby reduce tensions arising from events framed in a specific moment and resulting from tensions spanning over a decade. The law also seeks to lay a solid foundation to continue mitigating the consequences of a conflict that should never have occurred and, despite recent steps, remains latent.

=== Articles ===
Article 1.1 (included in Title I "Objective Scope and Exclusions") establishes the law's scope: "acts leading to criminal, administrative, or accounting liability, carried out in the context of the consultations held in Catalonia on November 9, 2014, and October 1, 2017, their preparation, or consequences, provided they were carried out between November 1, 2011 (January 1, 2012, in the initial bill) and November 13, 2023, as well as actions carried out in the context of the so-called Catalan independence process between these dates, even if not directly related to these consultations or carried out after their respective holding." The acts to be amnestied are then specified, divided into six categories:

Initial bill	Final text
a) Acts committed with the intention of claiming, promoting, or procuring the secession or independence of Catalonia, as well as those contributing to achieving such purposes. [...] b) Acts committed with the intention of convening, promoting, or procuring the holding of the consultations held in Catalonia on November 9, 2014, and October 1, 2017, by those lacking competence or whose convening or holding was declared unlawful, as well as those contributing to their achievement. [...] c) Acts of disobedience, of any nature, public disorders, attacks against authority, its agents, or public officials, or resistance carried out to enable the holding of the public consultations referred to in paragraph b) of this article or their consequences, as well as any other acts classified as crimes committed with the same intention. [...] d) Acts of disobedience, of any nature, public disorders, attacks against authority, its agents, or public officials, resistance, or other acts against public order and peace carried out to show support for the objectives and purposes described in the preceding paragraphs or for those prosecuted or convicted for committing any of the crimes covered by this article. e) Actions carried out during police operations aimed at hindering or preventing the commission of acts leading to criminal or administrative liability covered by this article. f) Acts committed to favor, procure, or facilitate any of the actions leading to criminal, administrative, or accounting liability contemplated in the preceding paragraphs of this article, as well as any others materially connected to such actions.	a) Acts committed with the intention of claiming, promoting, or procuring the secession or independence of Catalonia, as well as those contributing to achieving such purposes. [...] b) Acts committed with the intention of convening, promoting, or procuring the holding of the consultations held in Catalonia on November 9, 2014, and October 1, 2017, by those lacking competence or whose convening or holding was declared unlawful, as well as those contributing to their achievement. [...] c) Acts of disobedience, of any nature, public disorders, attacks against authority, its agents, or public officials, or resistance carried out to enable the holding of the public consultations referred to in paragraph b) of this article or their consequences, as well as any other acts classified as crimes committed with the same intention. [...] d) Acts of disobedience, of any nature, public disorders, attacks against authority, its agents, or public officials, resistance, or other acts against public order and peace carried out to show support for the objectives and purposes described in the preceding paragraphs or for those prosecuted or convicted for committing any of the crimes covered by this article. e) Actions carried out during police operations aimed at hindering or preventing the commission of acts leading to criminal or administrative liability covered by this article. f) Acts committed to favor, procure, or facilitate any of the actions leading to criminal, administrative, or accounting liability contemplated in the preceding paragraphs of this article, as well as any others materially connected to such actions.

Article 2 lists the acts excluded from the amnesty:

Initial bill	Final text
a) Intentional acts against persons resulting in death, abortion, or fetal injuries, loss or uselessness of an organ or limb, loss or uselessness of a sense, impotence, sterility, or severe deformity. b) Acts classified as crimes of torture or inhuman or degrading treatment under Article 3 of the European Convention on Human Rights, provided they exceed a minimum threshold of severity. c) Acts classified as terrorism crimes punished in Chapter VII of Title XXII of Book II of the Penal Code, provided a final judgment has been issued and they consist of any conduct described in Article 3 of Directive (EU) 2017/541 of the European Parliament and of the Council of March 15, 2017. f) Crimes in whose execution racist, antisemitic, anti-Roma, or other forms of discrimination based on the victim's religion or beliefs, ethnicity or race, sex, age, sexual orientation or gender identity, gender reasons, aporophobia, social exclusion, illness, or disability were found, regardless of whether such conditions or circumstances actually applied to the person affected by the conduct. e) Crimes affecting the financial interests of the European Union. d) Crimes of treason and against the peace or independence of the State and related to National Defense in Title XXIII of Book II of the Penal Code.	a) Intentional acts against persons resulting in death, abortion, or fetal injuries, loss or uselessness of an organ or limb, loss or uselessness of a sense, impotence, sterility, or severe deformity. b) Acts classified as crimes of torture or inhuman or degrading treatment under Article 3 of the European Convention on Human Rights, except those treatments that do not exceed a minimum severity threshold by not being suitable to humiliate or degrade a person, show a diminishment of their human dignity, or cause fear, anguish, or inferiority in a way capable of breaking their moral or physical resistance. c) Acts that, due to their purpose, can be classified as terrorism under Directive (EU) 2017/541 of the European Parliament and of the Council of March 15, 2017, on combating terrorism and which intentionally caused serious human rights violations, particularly those regulated in Articles 2 and 3 of the European Convention on Human Rights and in international humanitarian law. d) Acts classified as crimes in whose execution racist, antisemitic, anti-Roma, or other forms of discrimination based on the victim's religion or beliefs, ethnicity or race, sex, age, sexual orientation or gender identity, gender reasons, aporophobia, social exclusion, illness, or disability were found, regardless of whether such conditions or circumstances actually applied to the person affected by the conduct. e) Acts classified as crimes affecting the financial interests of the European Union. f) Acts classified as crimes of treason and against the peace or independence of the State and related to National Defense in Title XXIII of Book II of the Penal Code, provided there was both an effective and real threat and effective use of force against Spain's territorial integrity or political independence, as established in the United Nations Charter or Resolution 2625 (XXV) of the United Nations General Assembly of October 24, 1970, containing the declaration on principles of international law concerning friendly relations and cooperation among States in accordance with the United Nations Charter. g) Acts classified as crimes against the International Community included in Title XXIV of Book II of the Penal Code.

The six articles under Title II "Effects" address the law's effects:

- "The immediate release of persons benefiting from the amnesty who are in prison" (Article 4, paragraph a);
- "The annulment of search and arrest warrants and imprisonment orders for persons to whom this amnesty applies, as well as national, European, and international arrest warrants" (Article 4, paragraph b);
- "The immediate lifting of precautionary measures agreed upon prior to the entry into force of this law that involve the deprivation of the exercise of fundamental rights and public freedoms" (Article 4, paragraph c);
- "The termination of the execution of all custodial sentences, rights-depriving penalties, and fines imposed as principal or accessory penalties originating from actions or omissions amnestied" (Article 4, paragraph d);
- "Fully or partially served custodial sentences will not be credited in other criminal proceedings if the acts leading to the executed conviction are amnestied under this law. The same rule applies to periods of preventive detention not followed by a conviction due to the entry into force of this law" (Article 4, paragraph e);
- "The elimination of criminal records derived from convictions for amnestied criminal acts" (Article 4, paragraph f).

Additionally:

- "The definitive closure of all administrative proceedings initiated to enforce administrative liabilities incurred" (Article 5);
- "The full reinstatement of active and passive rights of sanctioned or convicted public employees, as well as their reincorporation into their respective bodies if they were separated," with recognition of their seniority and removal of unfavorable notes from their service records (Article 6);
- "It will not grant the right to receive any compensation or restitution of amounts paid as fines" (Article 7);
- "Civil and accounting liabilities arising from the acts described in Article 1.1 will be extinguished," although "the amnesty granted will always preserve the civil liability that may correspond to damages suffered by individuals" (Article 8).

Title III "Competence and Procedure" covers the last eight articles (9 to 16). Article 9 ("Competence for the application of the amnesty") establishes in paragraph 3 that "an act leading to criminal, administrative, or accounting liability can only be considered amnestied when declared so by a final resolution issued by the competent authority under the provisions of this law." Article 10 ("Preferential and urgent processing") mandates that decisions by judicial, administrative, or accounting bodies responsible for applying the amnesty "will be adopted within a maximum period of two months, without prejudice to subsequent appeals, which will not have suspensive effects." Article 11 establishes the procedure in the criminal sphere (dismissal during the investigation or intermediate phase; dismissal or acquittal during the oral trial phase; review of final judgments during the execution phase), Article 12 in the contentious-administrative sphere, Article 13 in the accounting sphere, and Article 14 in the administrative sphere.

Article 15 refers to the "timeframe for recognizing the rights included in this law," set at five years, and Article 16 addresses appeals ("Appeals provided for in the legal system may be lodged against resolutions that decide on the extinction of criminal liability or administrative and accounting infractions under this law").

=== Final provisions ===
The first final provision amends Article 39 of Organic Law 2/1982, of May 12, of the Court of Auditors, establishing in paragraph 3 that "those who committed acts amnestied under the terms established in the law will be exempt from liability." The second final provision amends paragraph 1 of Article 130 of the Penal Code, adding amnesty as a ground for extinguishing criminal liability. The third final provision states that "this law will enter into force on the same day of its publication in the Boletín Oficial del Estado" (June 11, 2024).

== Legislative process ==
The processing of the amnesty law was carried out under an urgent procedure, halving the usual deadlines for submitting amendments, the government's pronouncement on the bill, and the preparation of the preliminary report by the deputies of the drafting committee. The legislative process followed these stages:

1. Registration of the bill: The amnesty bill was registered in the Congress of Deputies on Monday, November 13, 2023, by the PSOE and its parliamentary allies, though only signed by the socialists.
2. Approval by the Congress Table: The table admitted the bill for processing on Tuesday, November 21, 2023.
3. Debate in the Congress Plenary: On Tuesday, December 12, 2023, the debate on the bill's admission took place, approved with 178 votes in favor (PSOE, Sumar, Junts per Catalunya, ERC, PNV, BNG, and Podemos) and 172 against (PP, Vox, UPN, and Canarian Coalition).
4. Inclusion of amendments and approval by the Congress of Deputies: During processing, an amendment proposed by Junts and ERC, supported by PSOE, was approved, amnestying terrorism offenses without "direct intent" to violate human rights. However, Junts deemed this insufficient and voted against the bill on January 30, 2024 (171 yes, 179 no), returning it to the Justice Committee. On March 7, 2024, after several extensions, PSOE and Junts reached an agreement, approving a final joint amendment with ERC, withdrawing remaining amendments, and removing Penal Code references. On March 14, 2024, an extraordinary plenary session approved the bill with the required absolute majority (178 yes, 172 no).
5. Processing in the Senate: On May 14, 2024, after exhausting the two-month deadline, the Senate vetoed the amnesty law, proposed by the PP's absolute majority, joined by Vox, UPN, and AHI, with 149 votes in favor and 113 against, returning it to Congress. PSOE senator and secretary-general of the PSOE-Aragón, Javier Lambán, did not attend, opposing the amnesty to avoid "an unbearable disloyalty" to himself.
6. Return to Congress for final approval: The law was finally approved on May 30, 2024, after Congress ratified it and lifted the Senate veto with a majority of deputies from PSOE and the groups that initially approved it on March 14, with 177 votes in favor (one Podemos deputy absent) and 172 against.
7. Application of the law: Once enacted, the amnesty law grants courts a two-month period to apply it.

== Reactions ==
=== Before the bill's content was known ===
September 4, 2023

The PP and Vox criticized the Brussels meeting between Yolanda Díaz, leader of Sumar and deputy prime minister, and "fugitive from justice" Carles Puigdemont, former president of the Generalitat of Catalonia. "Stop mocking Spaniards: what are you willing to do to stay in power?" wrote Cuca Gamarra on X, while Isabel Díaz Ayuso called the meeting "undignified." Vox leader Santiago Abascal described it as "extremely serious," stating, "Today, the Spanish government is sitting with a fugitive from justice, something that does not happen anywhere in the world where legality and citizens' dignity are respected."

September 5, 2023

Former socialist prime minister Felipe González opposed the amnesty, arguing it would "condemn the democratic regime as guilty of what happened" in the 2017 Catalan declaration of independence. He also condemned the previous day's meeting between Yolanda Díaz and Carles Puigdemont in Brussels. Two days later, Alfonso Guerra, deputy prime minister under González (1982–1991), expressed similar views.

September 10, 2023

Hundreds of people, summoned via social media, gathered in Madrid, Barcelona, and other cities on Sunday to protest against the amnesty law.

September 11, 2023

Over 100,000 people, according to the Guardia Urbana, demonstrated in Barcelona in favor of Catalan independence (and the amnesty) during the Diada.

September 12, 2023

Former Prime Minister José María Aznar called for mobilization against the amnesty, considering it "an operation to dismantle the Constitution, destroy its legitimacy, and reverse a great history of success." The government spokesperson labeled Aznar a "coup plotter."

September 19, 2023

The PP and Vox protested the Congress of Deputies' approval of a regulation reform allowing deputies to use co-official languages recognized in their respective Statutes of Autonomy. Congress President Francina Armengol, a socialist, permitted their use during the debate, with several speakers using Catalan, Basque, and Galician. When the first deputy used a co-official language (a socialist speaking in Galician), all Vox deputies left the chamber, placing their translation headsets on the empty seat of Prime Minister Pedro Sánchez, who was absent in Brussels.

September 24, 2023

A rally in Madrid, convened by the PP, protested the amnesty law.

=== After the bill's registration in the Congress of Deputies ===
September 26, 2023

During the first day of the investiture debate for Alberto Núñez Feijóo, president of the PP, he devoted much of his speech to rejecting the amnesty law. The response came not from Pedro Sánchez but from socialist deputy Óscar Puente, causing outrage among PP deputies. Feijóo failed to secure the investiture as prime minister, receiving 172 votes in favor and 177 against.

October 8, 2023

A demonstration in Barcelona, organized by Societat Civil Catalana, protested the amnesty law, attended by leaders of the PP and Vox.

October 12, 2023

Boos and jeers targeted President Sánchez during the military parade for National Day of Spain.

October 29, 2023

A rally in Madrid's Plaza de Colón, convened by Vox and affiliated organizations like DENAES, saw Santiago Abascal justify it as an act "against Sánchez's coup," claiming that "the coup perpetrated in 2017 by the treacherous Generalitat is now being attempted from the Moncloa Palace."

November 2, 2023

In a joint event with Núñez Feijóo, former Prime Minister José María Aznar urged action to save the Spanish Constitution of 1978 from its "liquidation." He called candidate Pedro Sánchez "a danger to Spanish constitutional democracy," stating, "Let those who can speak, speak. Let those who can act, act. Each with their responsibility." Feijóo described the amnesty as "the greatest humiliation in Spain for much of its centuries-long history."

November 3, 2023

Hundreds of protesters, summoned via social media the previous day, gathered in the afternoon and evening outside the PSOE's federal headquarters on Calle Ferraz in Madrid to protest the amnesty. The rally was supported by Vox, which stated, "This is just the beginning. Permanent mobilization against the greatest betrayal." The ultracatholic group HazteOir also backed the protest. Police blocked the street for several hours, with slogans like "Sánchez to prison, no amnesty, no forgiveness" and chants against King Felipe VI.

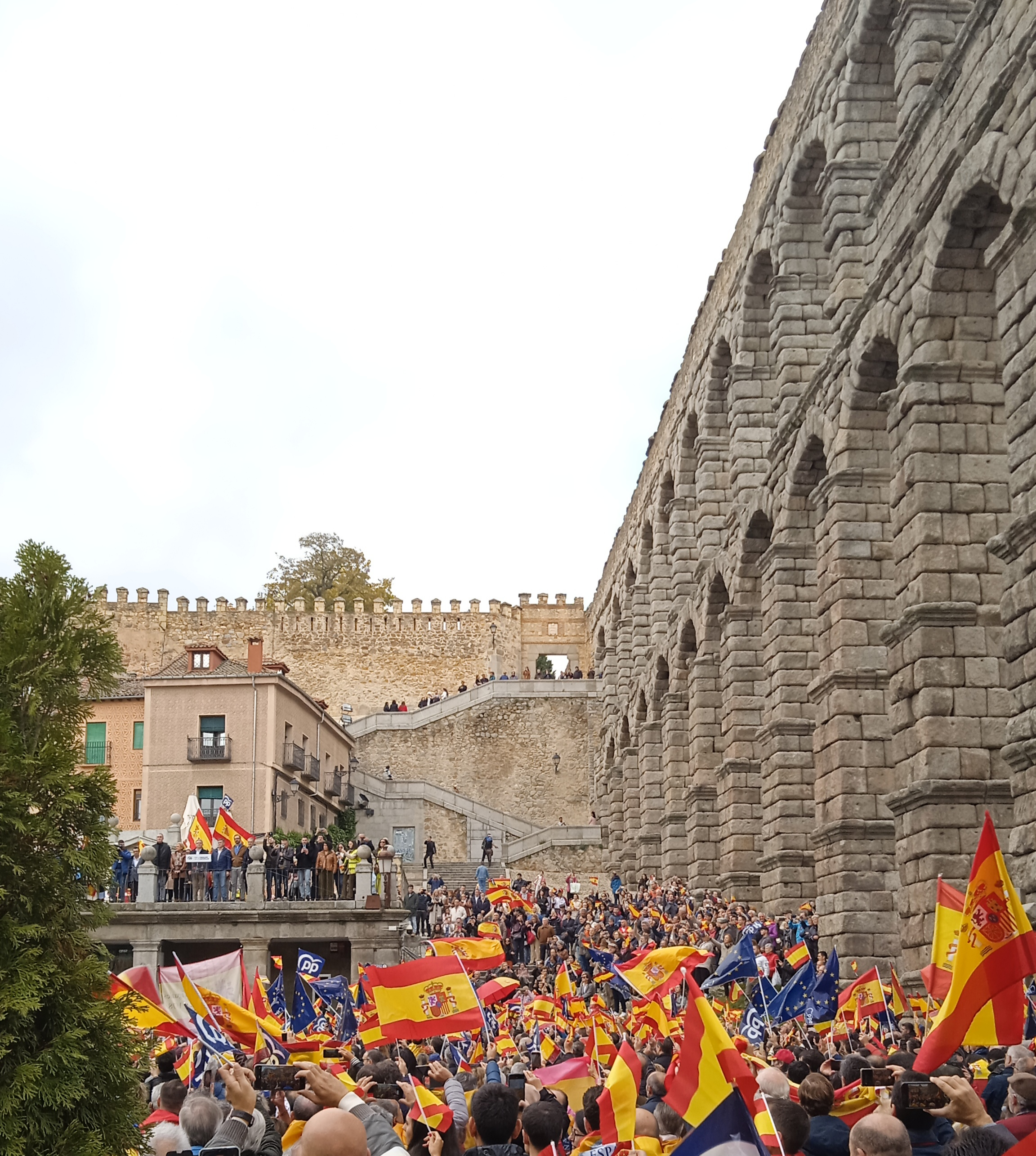
Protests against the amnesty near the Segovia Aqueduct in Segovia on November 12

November 4, 2023

At a PP event in Vitoria, Núñez Feijóo accused Pedro Sánchez of "buying the government" with public funds, adding, "Trading votes for impunity is corruption."

For the second consecutive day, hundreds gathered in the afternoon and evening outside the PSOE headquarters on Calle Ferraz. According to El País, the protest was backed by Vox, HazteOir, and the recently formed group Revuelta, which presents itself as "a youth movement [...] seeking to fuel the revolutionary spirit" of "patriotic youth" and is linked to Vox, with its most active social media members belonging to the party.

November 5, 2023

A PP-organized rally in Valencia against the amnesty saw Núñez Feijóo declare, "We will not stand still, they will not silence us."

November 6, 2023

PP leader Núñez Feijóo called the amnesty "the greatest democratic setback in our history" and announced protests in all 52 provincial capitals on Sunday, November 12, at noon, stating, "They will not silence us, they will not stop us."

The General Council of the Judiciary issued a statement against the amnesty, backed by the majority of its members.

November 9, 2023

The four judicial associations issued a document criticizing the creation of a parliamentary commission to investigate alleged lawfare against Catalan independentists, included in the PSOE–Junts agreement signed that day, arguing it undermines judicial independence and the rule of law. The document stated that the agreement on lawfare "could, in practice, mean subjecting judicial procedures and decisions to parliamentary review, clearly interfering with judicial independence and breaching the separation of powers."

PP leader Núñez Feijóo harshly criticized the PSOE–Junts agreement, calling it "another milestone in the erosion of Spanish democracy" and comparing it to attacks like the 23-F, ETA terrorism, or the 2017 Catalan declaration of independence, while calling for mobilization for the November 12 protests. Earlier, Madrid Community President Isabel Díaz Ayuso claimed the pact turned Spain "into a dictatorship."

Vox leader Santiago Abascal declared after the PSOE–Junts pact: "The definitive coup against democracy has been launched. The PSOE and Junts coup plotters have sealed their threat to national unity... The autocrat of the previous legislature is not content; in this legislature, he wants to be, outright, a dictator... The dictator on trial or those opposing this coup in jail."

The third day of violent incidents outside the PSOE headquarters on Calle Ferraz was led by far-right groups.

November 10, 2023

After learning that Pedro Sánchez secured the investiture with 179 deputies following agreements with the PNV and Canarian Coalition, PP secretary-general Cuca Gamarra called Sánchez’s investiture "an electoral fraud" and the rule of law "eroded," urging "all outraged citizens" to join the November 12 protests.

Former socialist Prime Minister José Luis Rodríguez Zapatero, in an interview with La Vanguardia, defended the PSOE–Junts agreement as "a great state pact that the PP should join" and supported the amnesty.

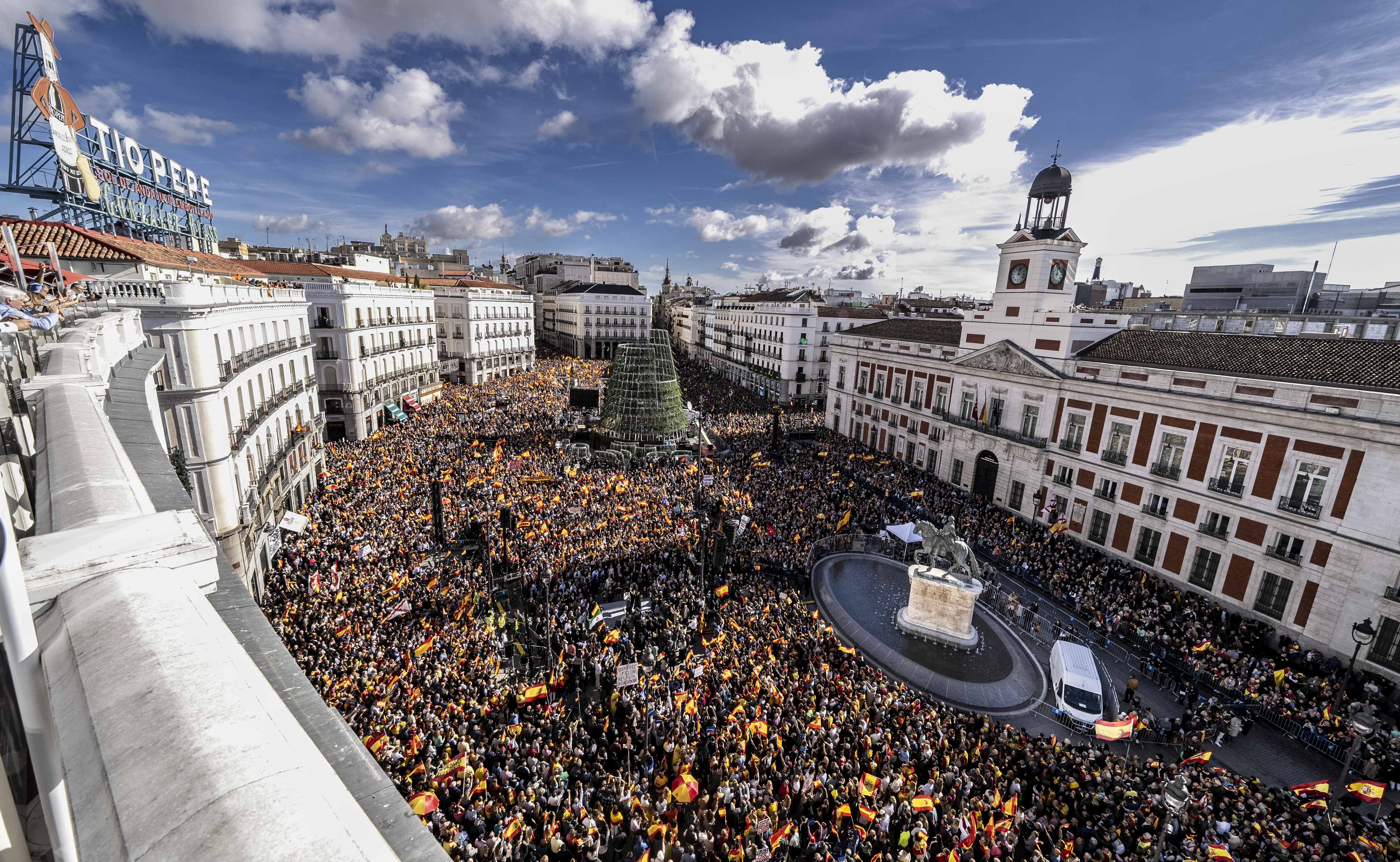
Demonstration called by the People's Party in Madrid against the amnesty law on November 12, four days before Pedro Sánchez's successful investiture

November 12, 2023

Hundreds of thousands gathered in all provincial capitals, convened by the PP, "In defense of the equality of all Spaniards," as stated in the manifesto read at each event. Its first paragraph reads: "Today, Spaniards are heard with one voice from squares across the country. Today, Spain is a clamor for equality, dignity, justice, coexistence, and diversity. In every corner of our territory, we say: No to privilege. No to impunity. No to amnesty."

Alberto Núñez Feijóo, who led the Madrid rally at Puerta del Sol, demanded new elections, stating, "We will not be silenced until we speak in elections."

For the tenth consecutive day, over a thousand people gathered outside the PSOE headquarters on Calle Ferraz, chanting slogans like "Spanish press, manipulative," "Pedro Sánchez, we want your neck," "Marlaska and Puigdemont are the same garbage," "Let Txapote vote for you," and "If you have the guts, call elections."

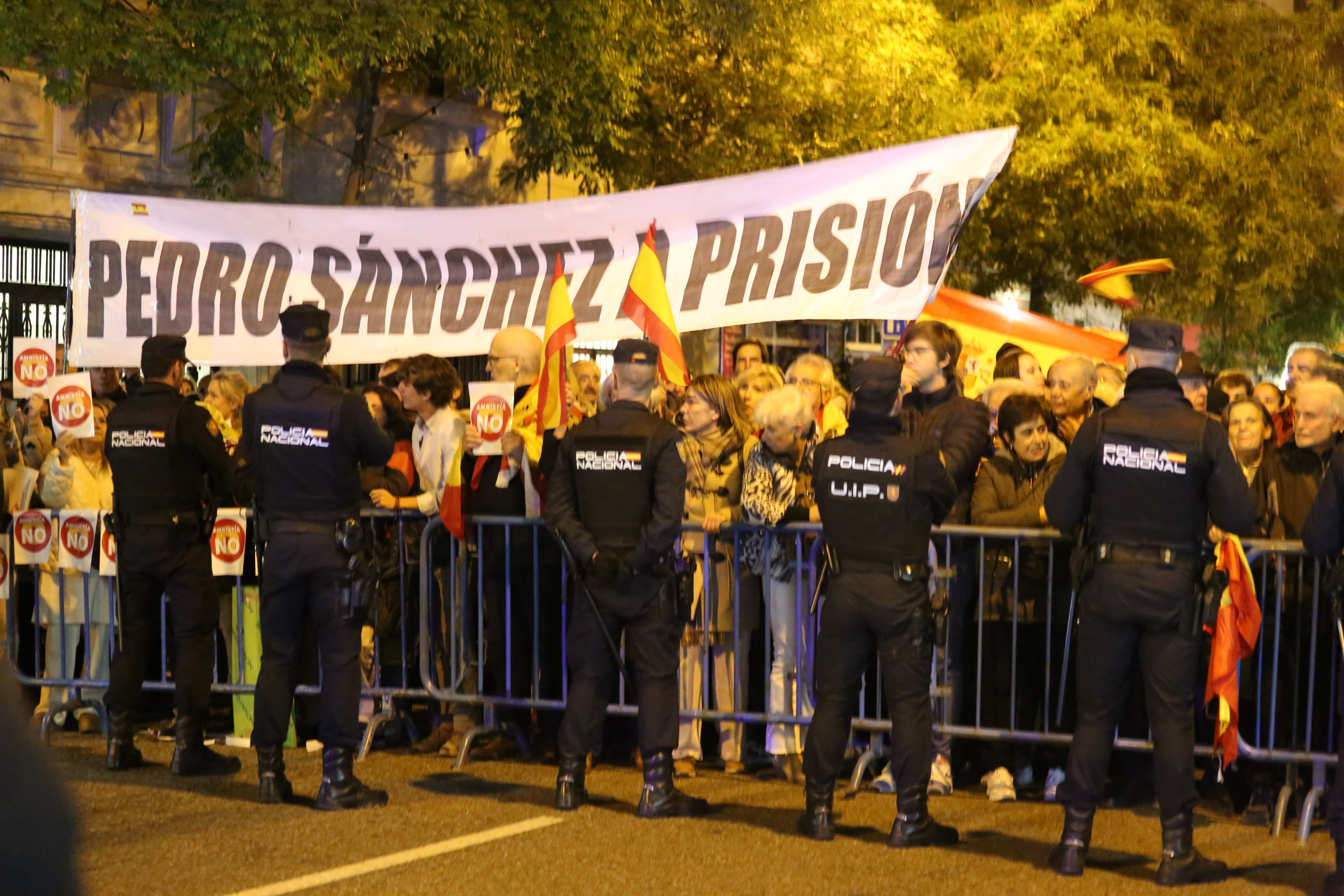
Rally near the PSOE headquarters in Madrid organized by the far-right lobby HazteOir.

November 13, 2023

The PP’s deputy secretary of organization stated that "for the humiliation our country is enduring, for allowing the humiliation of the rule of law, for allowing the humiliation of the separation of powers, essential in any democracy, I believe Pedro Sánchez himself should leave our country in a car trunk."

The Supreme Court’s Governing Chamber issued a statement defending judicial independence and the separation of powers, implicitly referring to the lawfare in the PSOE–Junts agreement.

The CEOE, without mentioning amnesty, warned of the "serious damage" to the separation of powers and legal certainty posed by the PSOE’s agreements for Sánchez’s investiture, emphasizing their direct impact on the principle of equality among Spaniards.

=== After the bill's registration in the Congress of Deputies ===
November 14, 2023

The PP passed a reform in the Senate, where it holds an absolute majority, amending its regulations to delay the amnesty law’s processing. With 147 votes in favor and 116 against, the reform empowers the Senate Table to decide whether initiatives are processed urgently or through ordinary procedures. The PP, led by Alberto Núñez Feijóo, argued the reform was necessary for thorough deliberation and to avoid legal issues, as seen with the "only yes is yes" law. The PSOE and its allies, who sought urgent processing in Congress, accused the PP of illegal obstruction and authoritarianism. Vox and UPN supported the reform.

British newspaper The Guardian published an editorial supporting the amnesty, highlighting the courage of the prime minister, who had already shown with pardons that "they undoubtedly helped defuse poisonous confrontations that led to Spain’s worst constitutional crisis since the return of democracy [...] Pedro Sánchez is right to bet again."

Socialist Josep Borrell, EU High Representative and former minister under Sánchez, stated in Brussels that the amnesty bill aimed to "wipe the slate clean." He said, "Amnesties are done for this purpose: historically, they mark the end of a conflict phase to wipe the slate clean. All amnesties have this goal. Naturally, this one does too." However, the previous day, he had expressed discomfort with the PSOE–Junts agreement.

Vox filed a complaint with the Supreme Court against acting Prime Minister Pedro Sánchez and former President of the Generalitat of Catalonia Carles Puigdemont for alleged crimes of bribery, cover-up or collaboration with terrorism, usurpation of judicial functions, and prohibited negotiations by public officials. The complaint also targeted their respective parties, PSOE and Junts, labeling them "coup organizations." Vox requested, as a precautionary measure, that the Supreme Court suspend Sánchez's investiture session scheduled for the next day. The complaint did not include treason charges against Sánchez, as such charges require approval by an absolute majority in the Congress of Deputies per the Constitution.

Hundreds of judges and prosecutors gathered outside the provincial courts of Seville, Jaén, Huelva, Cádiz, and Salamanca to express "concern" over the amnesty law. The association Judges and Magistrates for Democracy did not participate, stating that "defending the separation of powers requires maintaining an image of impartiality and neutrality that these acts do not guarantee."

November 15, 2023

The amnesty law dominated the first day of the investiture debate for Pedro Sánchez, who defended it as a "bet on a future of reconciliation and harmony" through "dialogue, forgiveness, and understanding" (phrases later criticized by the Junts spokesperson). Sánchez acknowledged that "circumstances are what they are, and we must make a virtue of necessity." Alberto Núñez Feijóo, PP leader, countered that "the amnesty does not improve coexistence; it destroys it by crushing constitutionalist Catalans and dividing the country." He concluded, "This is a legitimate investiture majority. I will say it as many times as necessary. But it is also true that your pacts stem from a massive fraud against citizens. You will be president by doing the opposite of what you promised during the campaign."

Vox leader Santiago Abascal called Sánchez’s government not only "illegitimate" but also "illegal," accusing it of a "coup d’état" and "dictatorship," comparing Sánchez to Nero and the "socialist" Hitler. He refused to retract these statements when prompted by the Congress president. Vox deputies then left the chamber, unwilling to hear Sánchez’s "lies." The socialist parliamentary group requested that Abascal’s offensive remarks against the PSOE and its leader be removed from the Diario de sesiones, which the Congress president approved. After leaving, Abascal joined far-right groups attempting to block Congress, where he was cheered with shouts of "President, president!" and later joined the thirteenth consecutive night of protests outside the PSOE headquarters on Calle Ferraz in Madrid.

The Supreme Court rejected Vox’s request to suspend Sánchez’s investiture session. The complaint failed to specify the alleged crime committed by Sánchez or the grounds for the complaint, leading to its dismissal.

November 16, 2023

On the second day of Sánchez’s investiture debate, spokespersons from four parliamentary groups (EH Bildu, PNV, BNG, and PSOE) supported the amnesty law, as did Sumar, ERC, and Junts the previous day. UPN and Canarian Coalition opposed it. Sánchez was invested as prime minister with 179 votes in favor and 171 against. When Alberto Núñez Feijóo congratulated Sánchez with a handshake, he said, "This is a mistake, and you will be responsible."

That night and into the early hours, the most violent incidents since the protests began occurred outside the PSOE headquarters on Calle Ferraz. Far-right groups overturned and burned containers and threw objects at riot police and journalists, who were heckled with shouts of "Spanish press, manipulative." Vox deputy Javier Ortega Smith was present during this fourteenth day of protests. The following morning, far-right groups attempted to block access to the Palacio de las Cortes and harassed and attempted to assault socialist deputies, who required police protection.

November 17, 2023

The digital newspaper Infolibre revealed a manifesto signed by about fifty retired military officers (anonymously) claiming the amnesty law is unconstitutional because it "eliminates equality before the law for all Spaniards and erases crimes committed by those who staged the coup in Catalonia." It called on "those responsible for defending the constitutional order" (implied to be the Armed Forces) to "dismiss the Prime Minister and call general elections." (Note: The manifesto’s relevant paragraph states: "Considering that Article 8.1 of our Constitution assigns to the Armed Forces the mission of guaranteeing Spain’s sovereignty and independence, defending its territorial unity, and defending the constitutional order, which we consider to be in serious danger due to the lack of judicial independence, inequality of Spanish citizens before the law, and the possible rupture of the Spanish nation’s unity, this group of former Armed Forces members, now retired, raises its voice in this Manifesto and requests those responsible for defending the constitutional order to dismiss the Prime Minister and call general elections, which we submit for the consideration of Spanish citizens to warn them and raise awareness of the gravity of the current situation.")

During a debate in the Basque Parliament, lehendakari Iñigo Urkullu stated that the amnesty bill "offers politics an opportunity to restart a project of coexistence through democratic means" and accused Vox of "encouraging a street uprising that disregards all democratic rules," calling it the greatest threat to democracy in Spain.

Former Prime Minister Mariano Rajoy, at an event in Madrid attended by Alberto Núñez Feijóo, called the amnesty bill unconstitutional and accused Sánchez’s pact with independentists of being a "deliberate plan to undermine judicial independence in Spain." He blamed Sánchez for causing "the greatest period of polarization" in Spain’s memory.

The Centre d'Estudis d'Opinió (CEO) of the Generalitat of Catalonia published a survey showing 60% of Catalans supported the amnesty, with 31% opposed. The survey also indicated a decline in electoral support for pro-independence parties, which would not secure an absolute majority in the Parliament of Catalonia, and a drop in support for Catalan independence (41% in favor, 52% against). The PSC widened its lead as Catalonia’s most-voted party.

November 18, 2023

Around one million people, according to organizers, or 170,000, per the Government Delegation, gathered in Madrid’s Plaza de la Cibeles to oppose the amnesty and Sánchez’s government (sworn in the previous day), chanting "Sánchez to prison!" and "Traitor government!" The rally’s slogan was: "Not in my name: no amnesty, no self-determination, for freedom, unity, and equality!" Leaders of the PP and Vox attended separately. Some protesters blocked the A-6 highway for two hours and attempted to reach the Palacio de la Moncloa, shouting, "Sánchez, you bastard, come out to the balcony."

November 20, 2023

The legal advisors of the Congress of Deputies endorsed the constitutionality of the amnesty bill, finding no obstacles to its processing. Vox accused them of prevarication for legitimizing a "blow to the rule of law." The PP requested the recusal of the Congress’s chief legal advisor, Fernando Galindo.

November 22, 2023

The European Parliament held a plenary session, requested by the PP and Vox, to debate the amnesty bill. EU Justice Commissioner Didier Reynders stated that "the Commission will continue to monitor this issue and follow its development," but noted that the Catalan conflict is "an internal Spanish matter" and would only comment once the law is finalized.

December 3, 2023

The PP held another anti-amnesty rally in Madrid under the slogan In Defense of the Constitution at the Temple of Debod, near the PSOE headquarters on Calle Ferraz. Around 15,000 people attended, according to organizers. Alberto Núñez Feijóo criticized the previous day’s meeting in Geneva between PSOE and Junts representatives with an international "mediator" (an El Salvador diplomat), stating, "This government is not with the Constitution. We will not accept the opacity with which Sánchez meets and negotiates. Spain’s dignity and democracy are not negotiated in secrecy. Having an El Salvador citizen decide Spain’s future is a humiliation. I demand, on behalf of Spain, an end to this nonsense." He announced further mobilizations.

=== During the parliamentary processing of the bill ===
December 13, 2023

During a European Parliament debate on the Spanish EU presidency ending December 31, Manfred Weber, leader of the European People’s Party from the CSU, launched a strong attack on the amnesty bill, countered by Pedro Sánchez. Carles Puigdemont, a potential amnesty beneficiary, also spoke, demanding Sánchez "keep his promises."

January 17, 2024

Legal advisors of the Congress’s Justice Committee deemed parts of the amnesty bill unconstitutional, contradicting the favorable report from November 20 by the Congress’s chief legal advisor.

January 28, 2024

The PP organized an anti-amnesty rally in Madrid’s Plaza de España, two days before the Congress of Deputies voted on the bill after the amendment process.

February 26, 2024

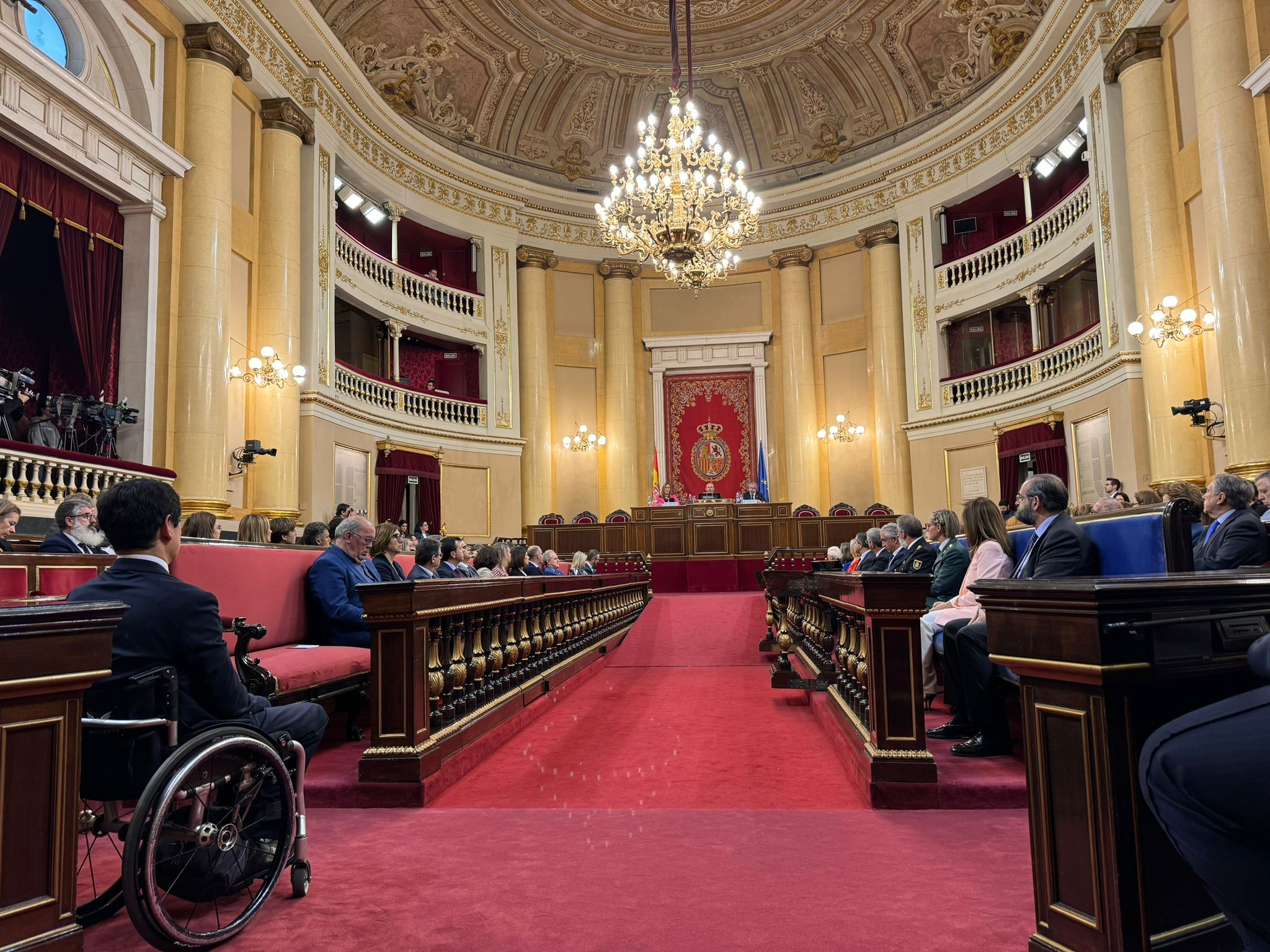
Territorial leaders of the PSOE appear in the Senate.

The president of the High Court of Justice of Catalonia, Jesús María Barrientos, sharply criticized the amnesty bill during an institutional speech at the swearing-in of 44 new judges assigned to Catalan courts. He stated that it "privileges a few over the citizenry as a whole" and cannot be "wielded as a tool for pacification, but rather for discord." He emphasized that a democratic society requires "orderly coexistence" through respect for the constitutional order and the rule of law, asserting that "no one, no person, entity, or organization, no matter how powerful or backed by votes, is above the law." He added that the law must be applied "without spaces for impunity" that would benefit only some.

March 1, 2024

A leaked draft (finalized on March 15–16) of the Venice Commission of the Council of Europe’s opinion on the amnesty bill endorsed "the possibility of an amnesty law" and stated that "national unity and social and political reconciliation are legitimate objectives." However, it criticized the urgent processing and noted that the law "has caused a deep and virulent division among the political class, institutions, judiciary, academia, and Spanish society," questioning its reconciliation goal. It suggested considering a constitutional amendment for such measures.

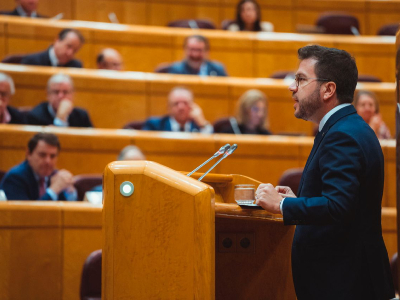
Pere Aragonès defends the amnesty law in the Senate.

March 9, 2024

Another anti-amnesty rally took place in Madrid’s Plaza de la Cibeles under the slogan "There are plenty of reasons! Sánchez, resign!" The manifesto, agreed upon by around 100 civic organizations with PP and Vox support (Feijóo did not attend, but Abascal did), stated: "The dizzying succession of inadmissible decisions, abject agreements, and shameful justifications seeks to anesthetize society, reduce its capacity to react, exhaust the population, and ultimately make us accept as inevitable a process whose ultimate goal is to perpetuate power and exclude at least half of Spain’s citizens from access to government."

March 15, 2024

The Venice Commission released its report on the amnesty law, aligning with the leaked draft. It did not disqualify the law but raised significant objections.

March 18, 2024

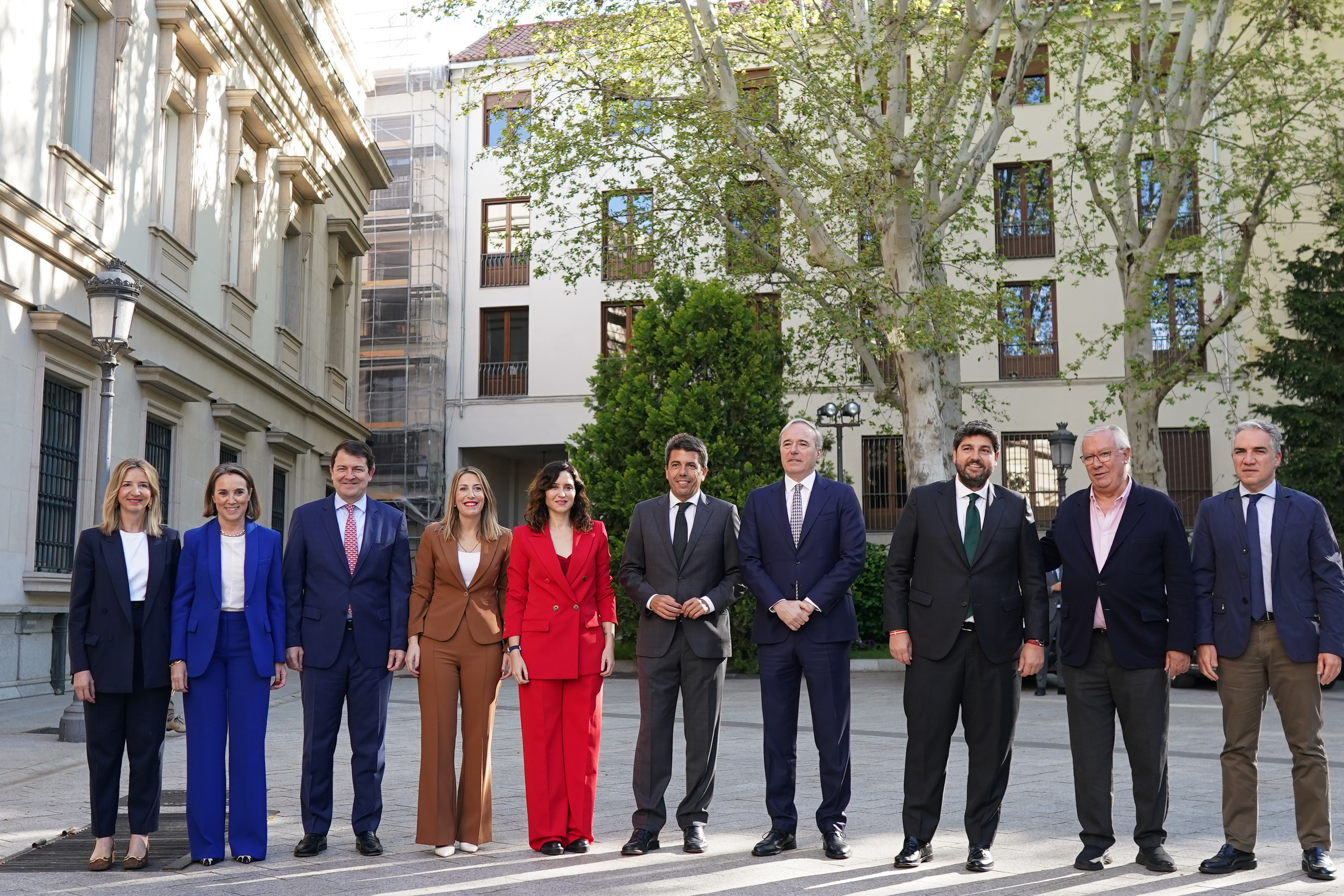
Presidents of autonomous communities governed by the PP in the Senate, opposing the amnesty law.

The Senate’s legal advisors issued a report deeming the amnesty law unconstitutional but acknowledged that the Senate cannot block its processing.

March 21, 2024

The General Council of the Judiciary, with 9 of 16 members in favor, approved a report opposing the amnesty law.

April 8, 2024

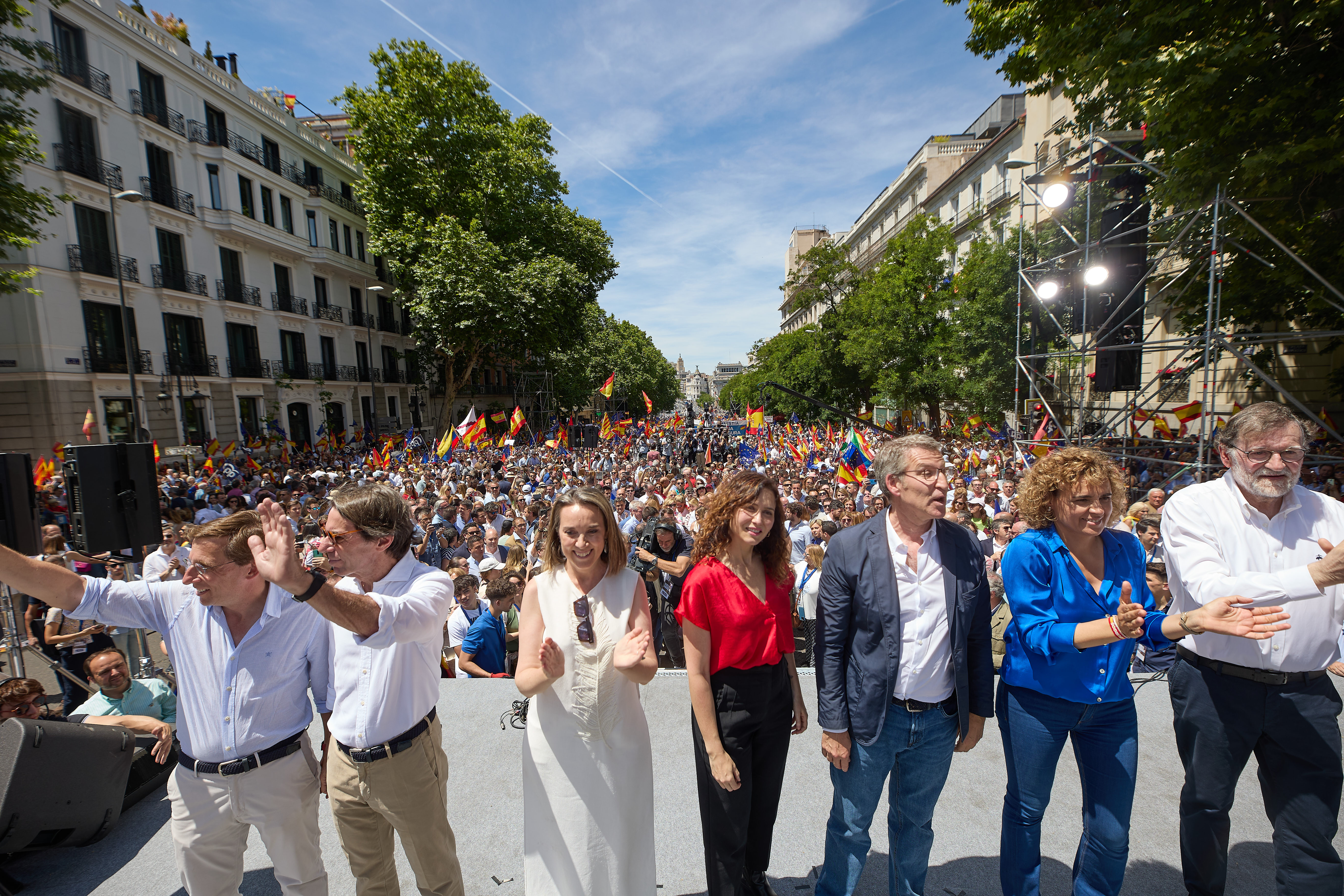
Martínez-Almeida, Aznar, Gamarra, Ayuso, Feijóo, Montserrat, and Rajoy at the España responde event in Madrid’s Puerta de Alcalá

The Senate’s General Committee of Autonomous Communities saw Pere Aragonès, president of the Generalitat of Catalonia, defend the amnesty law, while PP regional presidents opposed it. Neither the Basque lehendakari nor PSOE regional presidents attended, though PSOE leaders from Extremadura and Andalusia appeared in a different Senate chamber that day.

May 26, 2024

The PP held an anti-amnesty rally at Madrid’s Puerta de Alcalá.

=== After the law’s approval ===
May 30, 2024

On the day the Congress of Deputies definitively approved the amnesty law, the debate was highly tense, marked by insults, particularly between Sumar and Vox. Vox leader Santiago Abascal defended Israel and accused Sumar deputy Gerardo Pisarello of "deeply hating Spain." Pisarello responded, defending Palestine and criticizing Abascal for meeting "the butchers of Rafah," referring to his encounter with Israeli Prime Minister Benjamin Netanyahu.

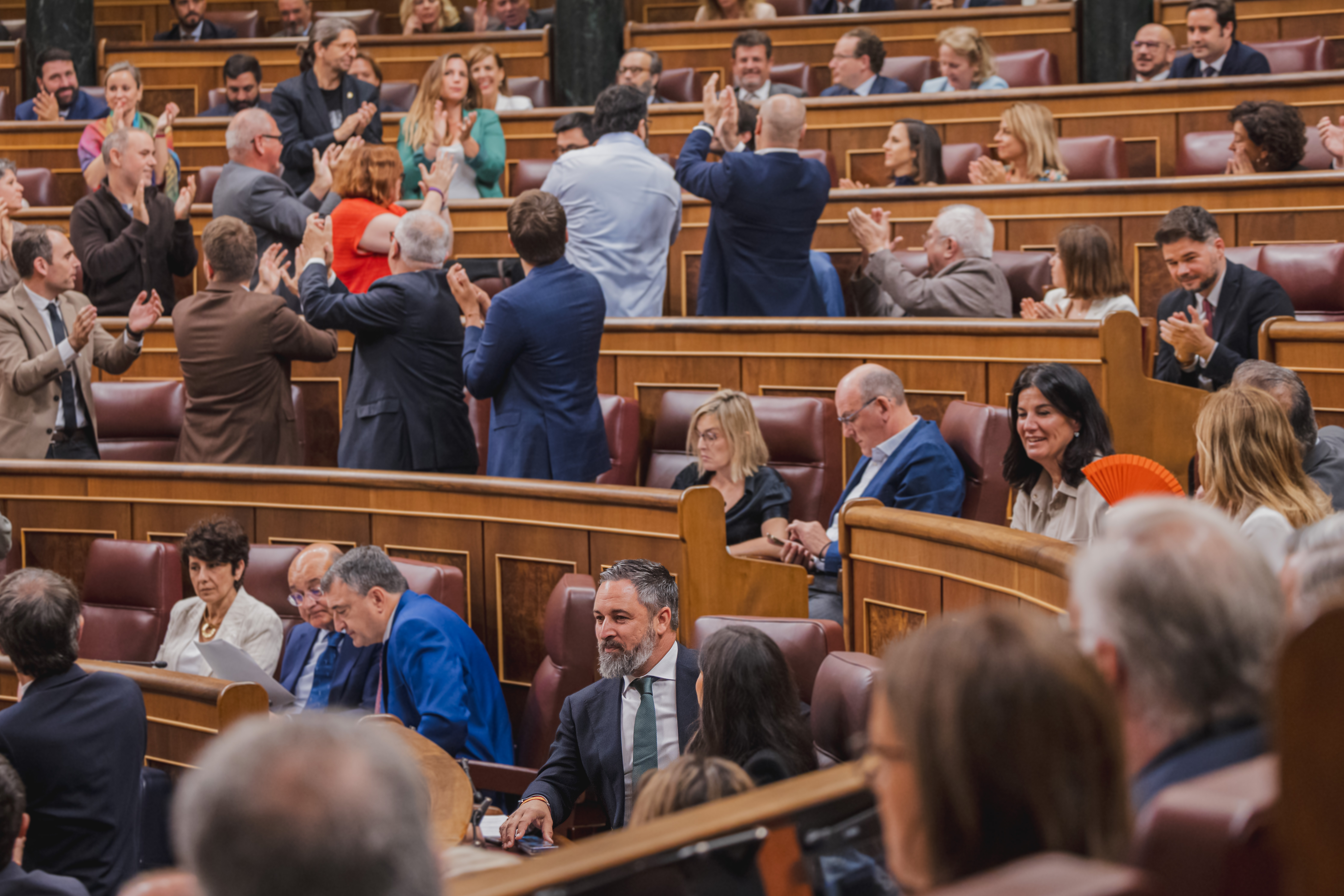
Sumar deputies applauding the law’s approval in front of Vox deputies

Far-right insults followed, with shouts of "out!" The Congress president reminded deputies that "being a democrat means listening to those who think differently," lamenting, "This is a spectacle the people don’t deserve," while calling two deputies (from PP and Vox) to order for clashing with left-wing deputies who stood up.

The session paused before PSOE deputy Artemi Rallo’s speech, who called Vox "neo-Nazis meeting with Netanyahu" and warned the PP of being "devoured by the neo-fascist beast roaming Spain and Europe." PP leader Alberto Núñez Feijóo opposed the amnesty, stating, "We have witnessed the death certificate of the PSOE. Today, from the Spanish Constitution, we say: keep the ambition of one man; we were not elected to lie."

Several PP-led autonomous community presidents, led by Isabel Díaz Ayuso, announced plans to file an unconstitutionality appeal with the Constitutional Court. Emiliano García-Page, socialist president of Castilla-La Mancha, also announced the next day his intent to file an unconstitutionality appeal.

Catalan independentist leaders Oriol Junqueras and Jordi Turull celebrated the law’s approval. Turull, Junts’s secretary-general, called it "a great victory for the independence movement" as they had "not renounced anything." He added that the law’s passage "is an opportunity" for judges to align with "European standards."

==== Constitutional Court Ruling ====
March 2025

The Constitutional Court annulled the PP’s Senate regulation reform that delayed the amnesty law’s processing, arguing that the Senate cannot alter deadlines set by Congress and the government, as its role is secondary in the legislative process. Despite this, the PP continues to push for new Senate reforms to strengthen its counterbalance to the government, including requiring the prime minister to appear monthly in the Senate and allowing senators to challenge Congress’s legislative processing decisions.

June 2025

On June 26, 2025, the Constitutional Court upheld the amnesty law by a 6–4 vote, with three minor corrections. The ruling justified the amnesty as having a legitimate and reasonable purpose: reducing political tension in Catalonia and fostering social cohesion. The Court deemed the law in the public interest and constitutional, noting that the legislature can decide on matters not expressly prohibited by the Constitution, based on the democratic principle, without evaluating the law’s political motivations.

The Court stated that the law is not arbitrary and that amnesties are constitutionally admissible in exceptional situations, such as the constitutional crisis from Catalonia’s secessionist process.

The three minor aspects deemed unconstitutional were: Article 1.1, which amnestied only "acts committed with the intention of claiming, promoting, or procuring Catalonia’s secession or independence," excluding those acting against the procés (e.g., police preventing the referendum), violating the principle of equality; Article 1.3, setting the law’s temporal scope, initially covering acts post-approval but amended to apply only until November 2023; and Articles 13.2 and 13.3, which the Court said must consider all parties affected by the Court of Auditors, not just the Prosecutor’s Office and public entities.

The ruling did not address the Supreme Court’s non-application of the law to leaders like Carles Puigdemont and Oriol Junqueras for embezzlement, noting these cases are still under appeal.

==== Challenges before the Court of Justice of the European Union ====
July 2024

On July 29, 2024, the Court of Auditors raised eight preliminary questions to the Court of Justice of the European Union (CJEU) about the amnesty law, arguing that diverting public funds for the procés may have affected EU financial interests and that the law is "very difficult to reconcile" with EU efforts to prevent fraud and corruption impunity.

On July 30, the High Court of Justice of Catalonia raised a preliminary question to the CJEU, arguing that the amnesty law may contravene EU anti-corruption and anti-fraud regulations.

September 2024

On September 6, 2024, the National Court raised a preliminary question to the CJEU regarding the amnesty law’s application to twelve Committees for the Defense of the Republic members prosecuted for terrorism. It argued that the law may contravene Directive 2017/541, which sets penalties for participation in terrorist organizations.

February 2025

On February 10, 2025, the Penal Court No. 3 of Vilanova i la Geltrú raised nine preliminary questions to the CJEU, arguing that the amnesty law’s primary purpose was to secure Pedro Sánchez’s investiture rather than serve the general interest, potentially violating principles of equality, non-discrimination, and the rule of law.

June 2025

On June 10, 2025, the European Commission argued in its submissions to the CJEU regarding the Court of Auditors’s preliminary question that the amnesty law did not serve a "general interest" and appeared to be a self-amnesty, as it was part of a political agreement to secure Sánchez’s investiture with votes from its beneficiaries.

July 2025

On July 15, 2025, the European Commission again questioned before the CJEU whether the amnesty law served a "general interest," suggesting it could be a self-amnesty to secure Sánchez’s investiture with support from its beneficiaries. It also questioned the law’s compliance with EU law, principles of legal certainty, equality before the law, and EU values.

== See also ==
- 2023–2024 Spanish protests
- 1977 Spanish Amnesty Law
