= Velilla de San Antonio =

- Municipality
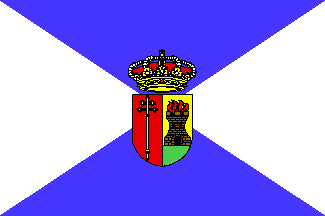
- Flag Coat of arms

- Location in Spain
- Coordinates: 40°22′N 3°29′W
- Country: Spain
- Autonomous community: Madrid
- Province: Madrid
- Comarca: Madrid Metropolitan Area

Government
  - Alcalde: Julio Sanchez (2009) (PP)

Area
  - Total: 14.35 km^{2} (5.54 sq mi)
- Elevation: 553 m (1,814 ft)

Population (2025-01-01)
  - Total: 14,468
  - Density: 1,008/km^{2} (2,611/sq mi)
- Demonym: Velilleros
- Time zone: UTC+1 (CET)
  - Summer (DST): UTC+2 (CEST)
- Postal code: 28891
- Official language(s): Spanish
- Website: Official website

Velilla de San Antonio is a town in Spain. It is located in the Madrid Metropolitan Area, in the Community of Madrid. It had a population of 12,770 in 2022.
